= Mount Woolsey =

Mountain in Wyoming, United States

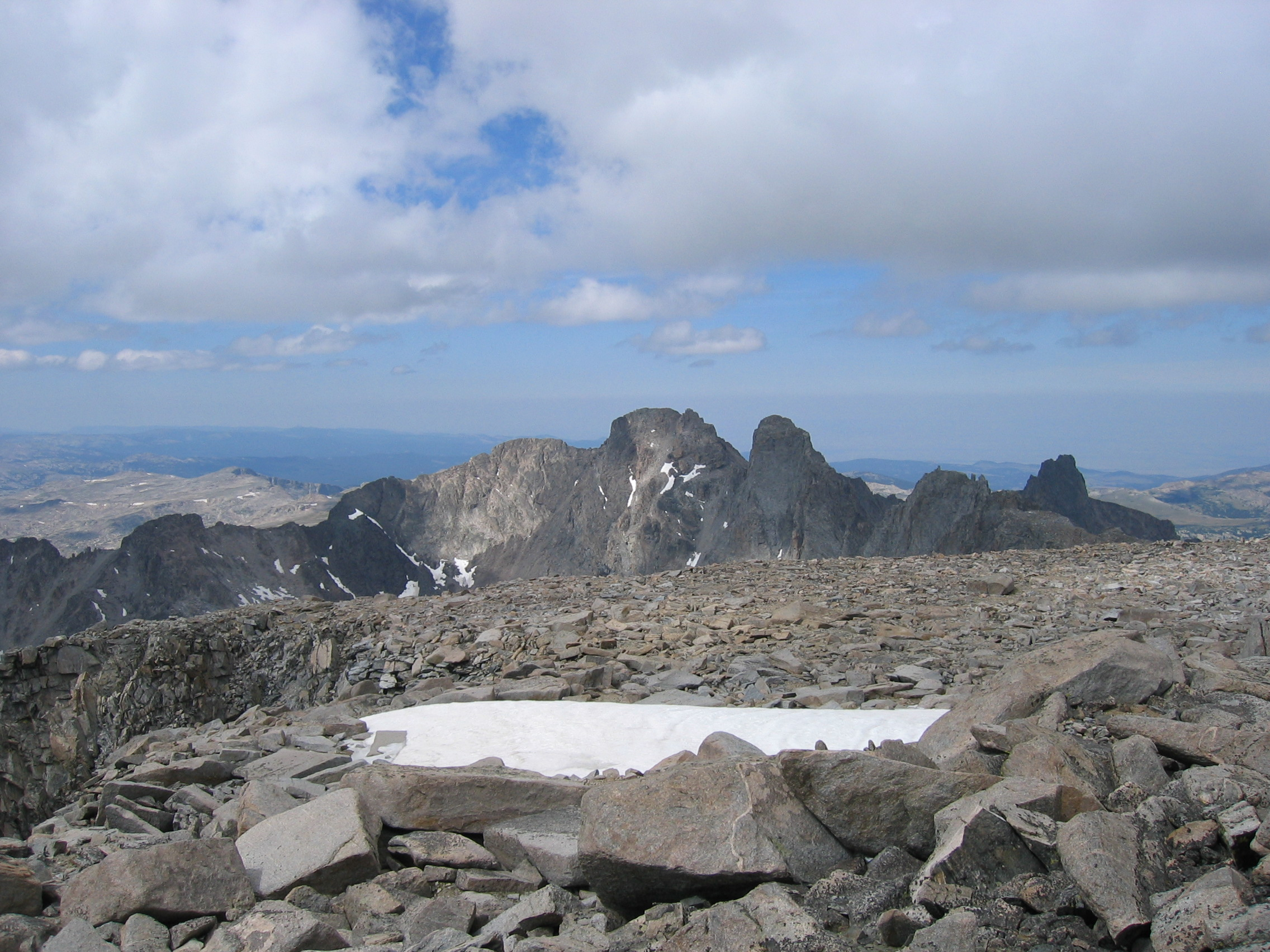
- Black Tooth Mountain, as viewed from the summit of Cloud Peak. Mount Woolsey is to the immediate right of Black Tooth Mountain.

Highest point
- Elevation: 12,982 ft (3,957 m)
- Prominence: 338 ft (103 m)
- Coordinates: 44°24′04″N 107°10′36″W

Geography
- Location within Wyoming Location within the United States
- Location: Big Horn / Johnson counties, Wyoming, U.S.
- Parent range: Bighorn Mountains
- Topo map: USGS Cloud Peak

Climbing
- First ascent: 1933, W. B. Willcox et al

Mount Woolsey (12,982 feet or 3,957 metres) is located in the Bighorn Mountains in the U.S. state of Wyoming. The peak is the third highest in the range after Cloud Peak, which is only 1.3 miles (2.1 km) to the south, and the summit is located in the Cloud Peak Wilderness of Bighorn National Forest. Black Tooth Mountain, the second highest mountain in the Bighorns, is an adjacent summit only .20 mi (0.32 km) to the northwest. Mount Woolsey is on a knife-like ridge known as an arête and is connected to both Black Tooth Mountain and Cloud Peak by this ridge. Along the arête is another mountain peak known as The Innominate. A small glacier lies below the arête to the southeast of Mount Woolsey.

The first recorded ascent was made by a party comprising W. B. Willcox, Alan Willcox, Mary Willcox and T. H. Rawles who ascended the south ridge.

The name Mt. Woolsey was formally approved in 1961 and commemorates Theodore Salisbury Woolsey Jr. who died a few days before the ascent by the Willcox party, Theodore Woolsey was the father of Elizabeth Woolsey who had been climbing with Willcox party until she heard of her father's unexpected death.
