= The Innominate =

Mountain in Wyoming, United States

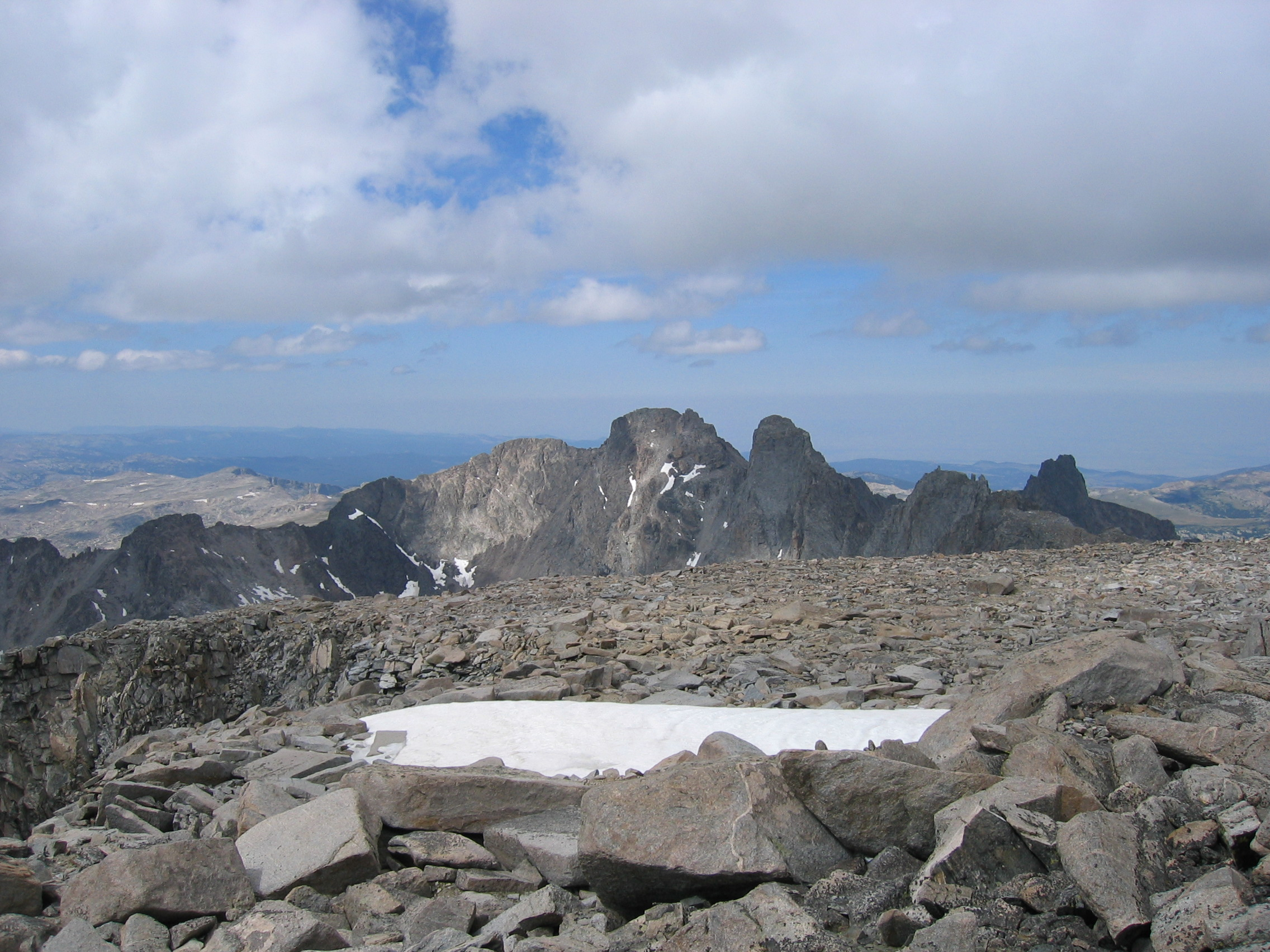
- As seen from Cloud Peak, left to right, Black Tooth Mountain, Woolsey Peak, The Innominate and Hallelujah Peak.

Highest point
- Elevation: 12,761 ft (3,890 m)
- Prominence: 310 ft (94 m)
- Coordinates: 44°23′54″N 107°10′25″W

Geography
- Location within Wyoming Location within the United States
- Location: Big Horn / Johnson counties, Wyoming, U.S.
- Parent range: Bighorn Mountains
- Topo map: USGS Cloud Peak

Climbing
- First ascent: 1933, W. B. Willcox and Alan Willcox

The Innominate (12,761 feet or 3,890 metres) is a mountain peak located in the Bighorn Mountains in the U.S. state of Wyoming. Situated along a knife-like ridge known as an arête, the summit is located in the Cloud Peak Wilderness of Bighorn National Forest. The slightly taller Mount Woolsey is .30 miles (0.48 km) to the northwest. A small glacier lies below the arête to the east.

The first recorded ascent was made by W. B. Willcox and his brother Alan Willcox.
