= Hallelujah Peak =

Mountain in the American state of Wyoming

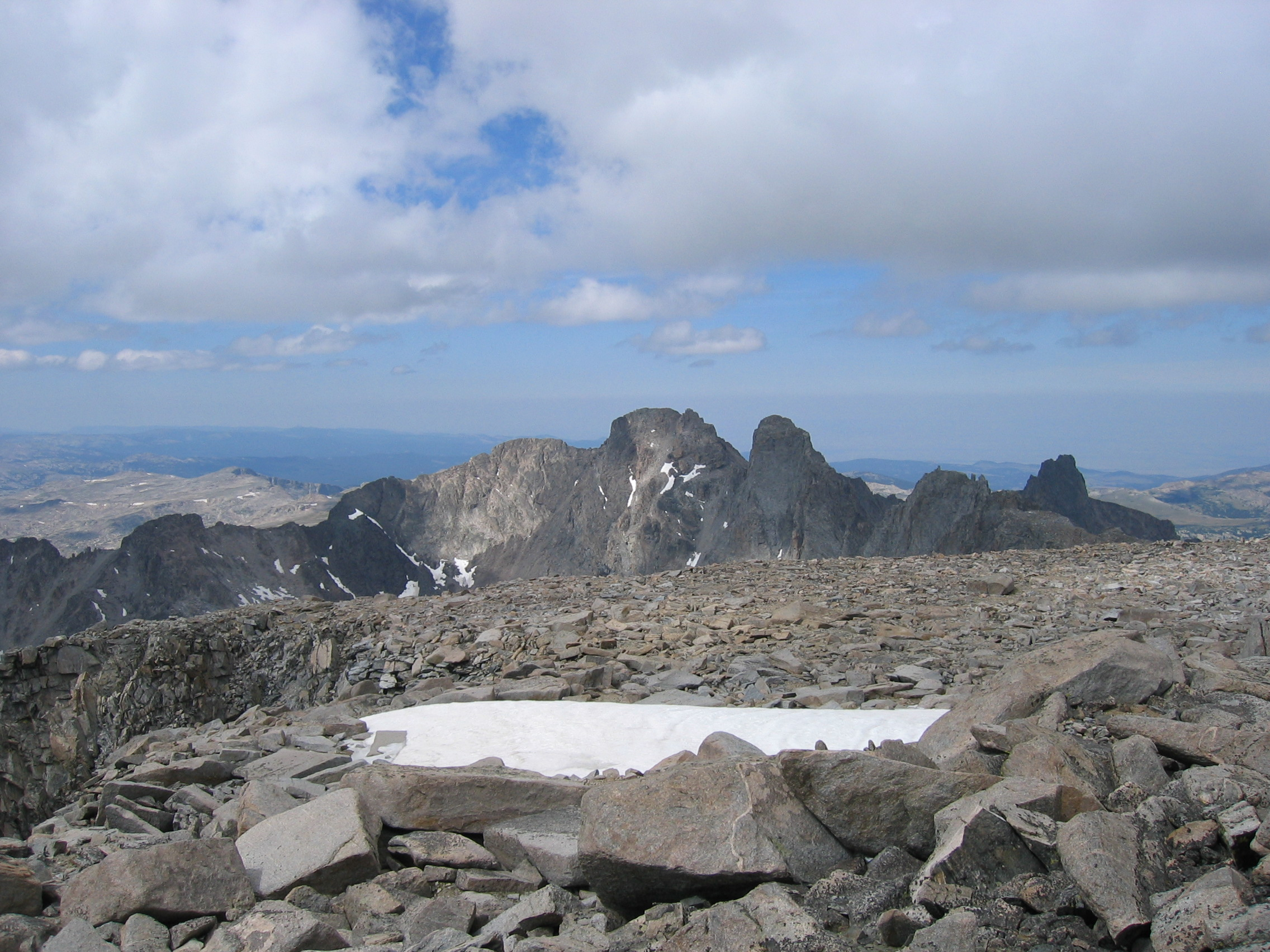
- From the summit of Cloud Peak, left to right, Black Tooth Mountain, Mount Woolsey and Hallelujah Peak at far right.

Highest point
- Elevation: 12,594 ft (3,839 m)
- Prominence: 350 ft (110 m)
- Coordinates: 44°24′32″N 107°10′10″W

Geography
- Location within Wyoming Location within the United States
- Location: Johnson County, Wyoming, U.S.
- Parent range: Bighorn Mountains
- Topo map: USGS Cloud Peak

Climbing
- First ascent: 11 July 1933, W. B. Willcox and Alan Willcox

Hallelujah Peak (12,594 feet; 3,839 m), also known as Peak 12590, is located in the Bighorn Mountains in the U.S. state of Wyoming. The peak is the fifth-highest in the range and it is in the Cloud Peak Wilderness of Bighorn National Forest. Hallelujah Peak is 0.64 miles (1.03 km) northeast of Black Tooth Mountain and connected to that peak by a knife-like ridge known as an arête.

The first recorded ascent was made by W. B. Willcox and his brother Alan Willcox.
