= Mather Peaks =

Mountain in the American state of Wyoming

- Location within Wyoming Location within the United States

Highest point
- Elevation: 12,400 ft (3,800 m)
- Prominence: 1,480 ft (450 m)
- Coordinates: 44°19′27″N 107°08′48″W

Geography
- Location: Big Horn and Johnson Counties, Wyoming, U.S.
- Parent range: Bighorn Mountains
- Topo map: USGS Lake Helen

Climbing
- Easiest route: Scramble

Mather Peaks (elevation range is 12,404 to 12,444 feet (3,781 to 3,793 m)) is located in the Bighorn Mountains in the U.S. state of Wyoming. The peak is the sixth highest in the range and it is in the Cloud Peak Wilderness of Bighorn National Forest. Mather Peaks is 4.5 miles (7.2 km) northwest of Darton Peak and 3.2 mi (5.1 km) south of Bomber Mountain.

== Climate ==
Climate data for Mather Peak East 44.3361 N, 107.1662 W, Elevation: 12,087 ft (3,684 m) (1991–2020 normals)
Month	Jan	Feb	Mar	Apr	May	Jun	Jul	Aug	Sep	Oct	Nov	Dec	Year
Mean daily maximum °F (°C)	18.6 (−7.4)	19.2 (−7.1)	25.8 (−3.4)	29.4 (−1.4)	38.4 (3.6)	48.9 (9.4)	58.1 (14.5)	57.1 (13.9)	48.6 (9.2)	35.9 (2.2)	24.7 (−4.1)	18.1 (−7.7)	35.2 (1.8)
Daily mean °F (°C)	8.9 (−12.8)	8.1 (−13.3)	13.7 (−10.2)	17.7 (−7.9)	26.5 (−3.1)	36.3 (2.4)	44.7 (7.1)	43.7 (6.5)	35.7 (2.1)	24.7 (−4.1)	15.2 (−9.3)	8.8 (−12.9)	23.7 (−4.6)
Mean daily minimum °F (°C)	−0.8 (−18.2)	−2.9 (−19.4)	1.6 (−16.9)	6.1 (−14.4)	14.6 (−9.7)	23.7 (−4.6)	31.3 (−0.4)	30.4 (−0.9)	22.9 (−5.1)	13.5 (−10.3)	5.6 (−14.7)	−0.5 (−18.1)	12.1 (−11.1)
Average precipitation inches (mm)	3.52 (89)	3.36 (85)	3.73 (95)	4.79 (122)	4.87 (124)	4.52 (115)	2.68 (68)	1.44 (37)	3.04 (77)	3.64 (92)	3.32 (84)	3.01 (76)	41.92 (1,064)
Source: PRISM Climate Group
