= Loaf Mountain =

Mountain in Wyoming, United States

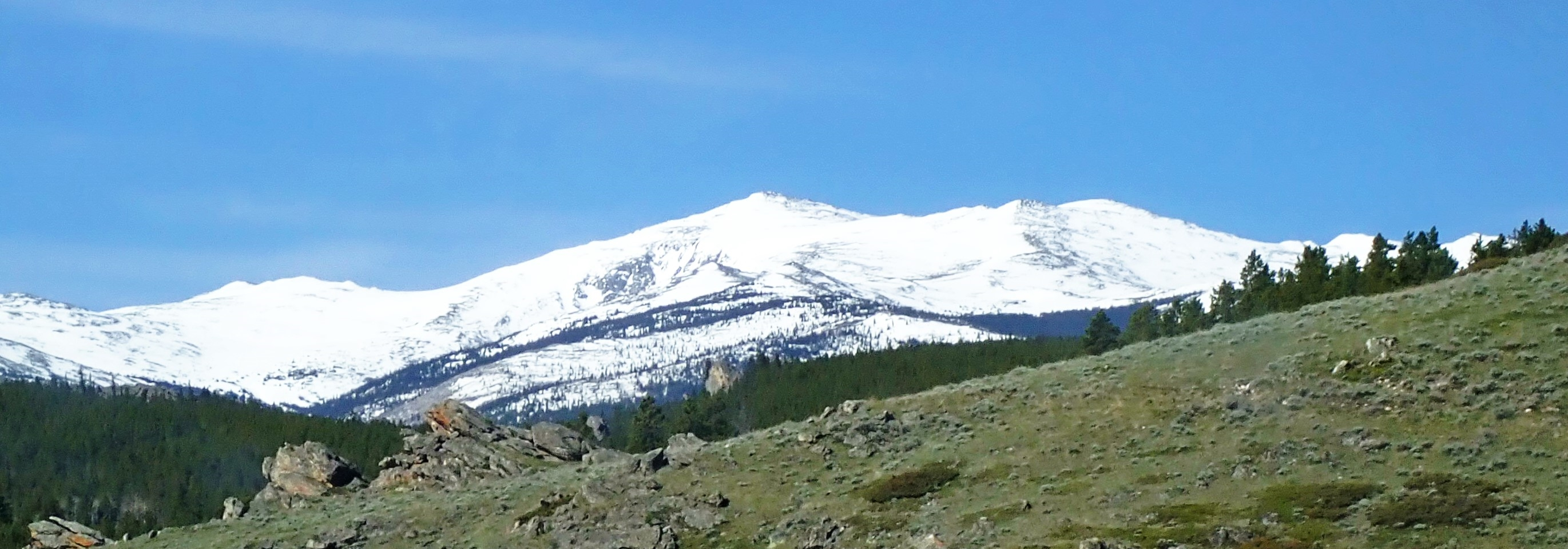
- Northeast aspect

Highest point
- Elevation: 11,722 ft (3,573 m)
- Prominence: 991 ft (302 m)
- Parent peak: Bighorn Peak (12,324 ft)
- Isolation: 3.38 mi (5.44 km)
- Coordinates: 44°12′47″N 107°04′15″W

Geography
- Location within Wyoming Location within the United States
- Country: United States
- State: Wyoming
- County: Johnson
- Protected area: Cloud Peak Wilderness
- Parent range: Bighorn Mountains; Rocky Mountains
- Topo map: USGS Powder River Pass

Geology
- Orogeny: Laramide orogeny
- Rock age: Precambrian
- Rock type: granitic

Climbing
- Easiest route: class 2 hiking

Loaf Mountain is a 11,722-foot-elevation (3,573-meter) summit in Johnson County, Wyoming, United States.

== Description ==
Loaf Mountain is located 20 miles (32 km) southwest of Buffalo, Wyoming, in the Bighorn Mountains. It is situated on the boundary that the Cloud Peak Wilderness shares with Bighorn National Forest. The nearest higher neighbor is Bighorn Peak, 3.38 miles (5.44 km) to the northwest. Topographic relief is modest as the summit rises over 1,600 feet (488 meters) above Paradise Lake in 0.75 mile (1.2 km). Precipitation runoff from the mountain's west slope drains to the Nowood River via Tensleep Creek, whereas the east slope drains to Powder River via Clear Creek. The Loaf Mountain Overlook Observation Site (44° 14.965' N, 106° 56.484' W) along the Cloud Peak Skyway (U.S. Route 16) provides a place to stop and view this mountain. This mountain's toponym has been officially adopted by the U.S. Board on Geographic Names.

== Climate ==
According to the Köppen climate classification system, Loaf Mountain is located in an alpine subarctic climate zone with long, cold, snowy winters, and cool to warm summers. Due to its altitude, it receives precipitation all year, as snow in winter, and as thunderstorms in summer.

== See also ==
- List of mountain peaks of Wyoming
