= Darton Peak =

Mountain in Wyoming, United States

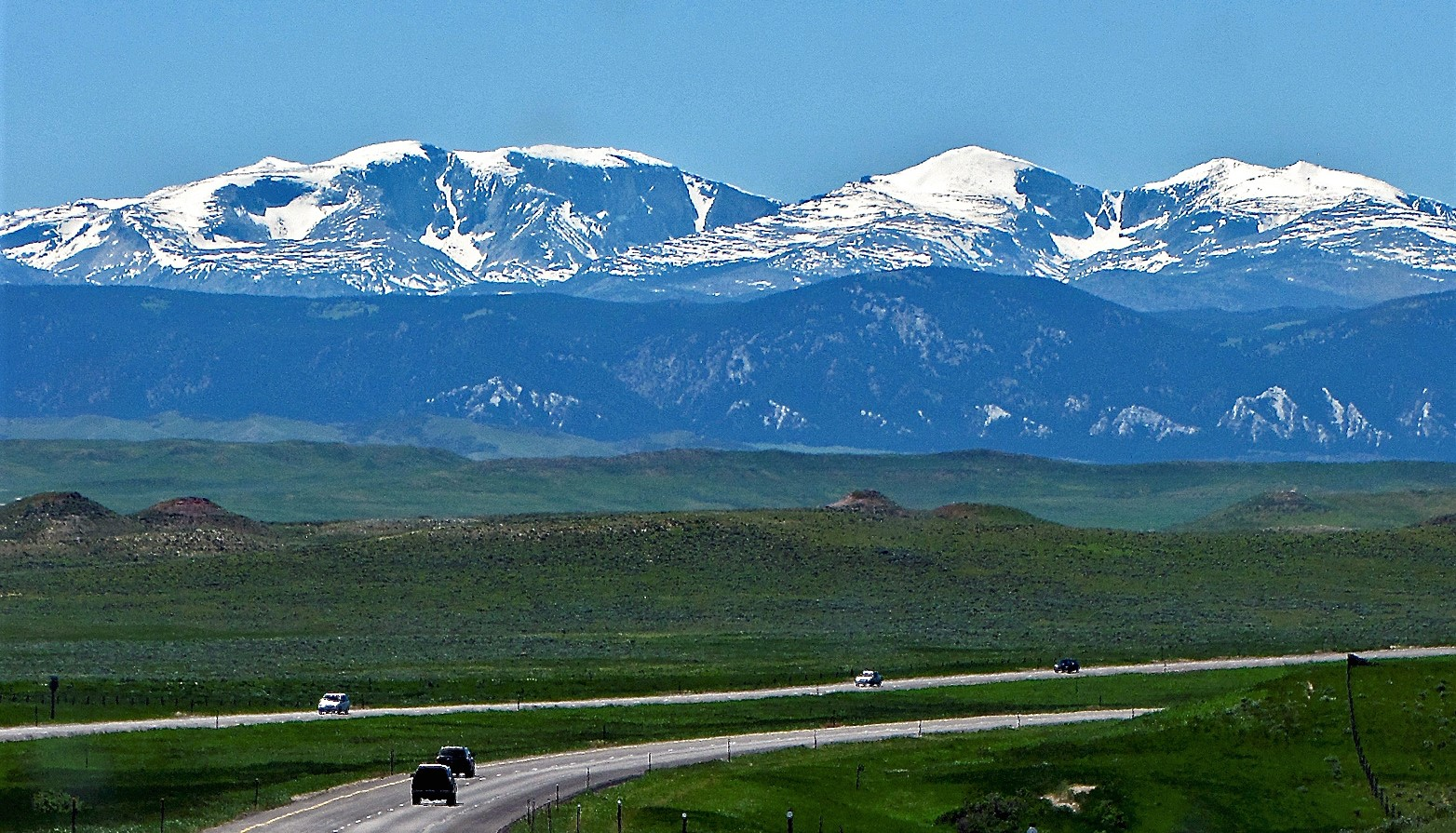
- East aspect (right of center), from I-90 (Bighorn Peak to the left)

Highest point
- Elevation: 12,279 ft (3,743 m)
- Prominence: 755 ft (230 m)
- Coordinates: 44°16′34″N 107°06′33″W

Geography
- Location within Wyoming Location within the United States
- Location: Johnson County, Wyoming, U.S.
- Parent range: Bighorn Mountains
- Topo map: USGS Lake Angeline

Climbing
- Easiest route: Scramble

Darton Peak (12,279 feet (3,743 m)) is located in the Bighorn Mountains in the U.S. state of Wyoming. The peak is the eighth-highest in the range and it is in the Cloud Peak Wilderness of Bighorn National Forest. Darton Peak is 1.5 miles (2.4 km) north of Bighorn Peak and 4.5 mi (7.2 km) southeast of Mather Peaks.
