= Black Tooth Mountain =

Mountain in Wyoming, United States

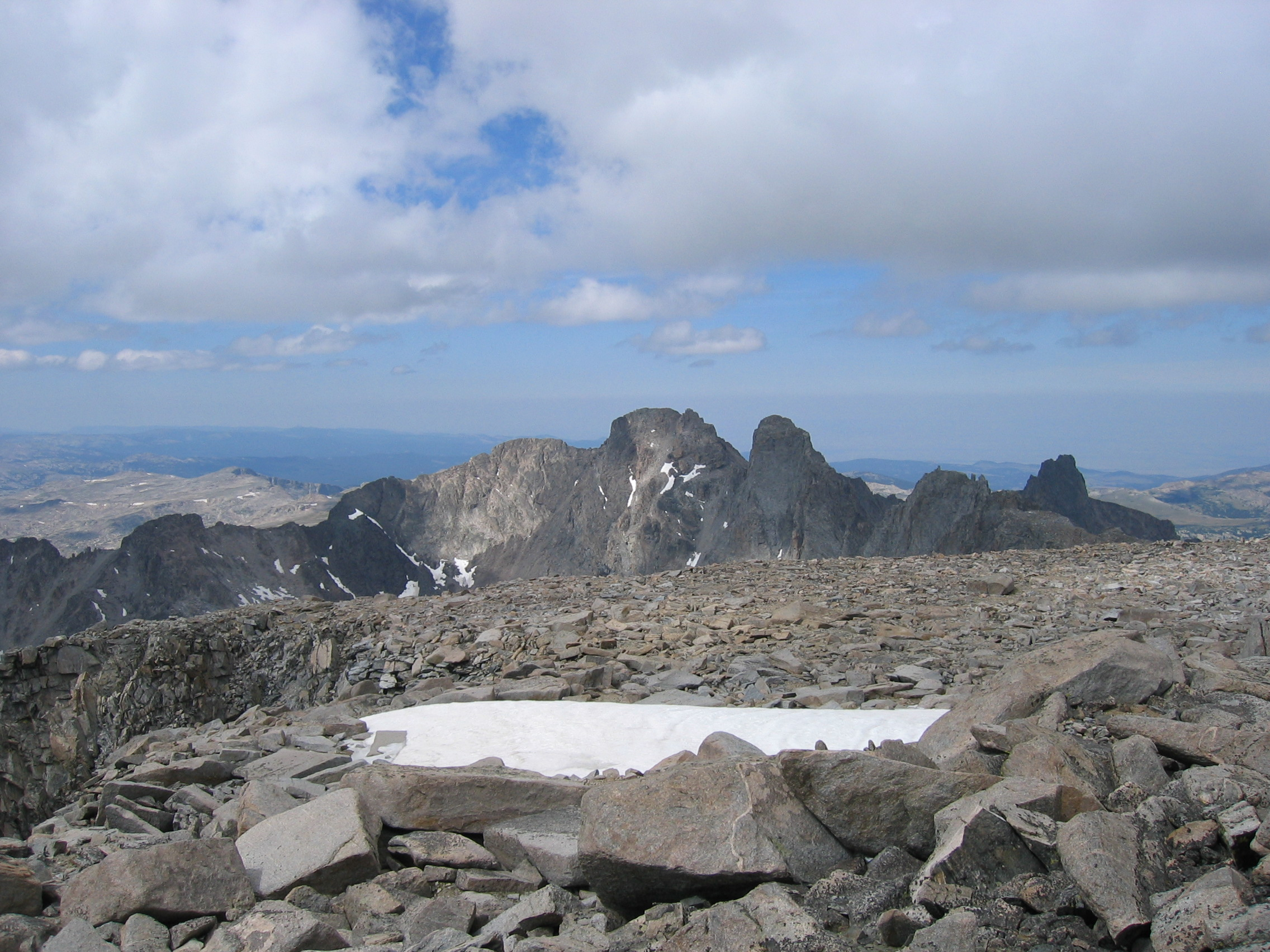
- Black Tooth Mountain, as viewed from the summit of Cloud Peak. Mount Woolsey is to the immediate right of Black Tooth Mountain.

Highest point
- Elevation: 13,009 ft (3,965 m)
- Prominence: 645 ft (197 m)
- Coordinates: 44°24′10″N 107°10′32″W

Geography
- Location within Wyoming Location within the United States
- Location: Big Horn / Johnson counties, Wyoming, U.S.
- Parent range: Bighorn Mountains
- Topo map: USGS Cloud Peak

Climbing
- First ascent: July 1933, W. B. Willcox et al

Black Tooth Mountain (13,009 feet or 3,965 metres) is located in the Bighorn Mountains in the U.S. state of Wyoming. The peak is the second highest in the range after Cloud Peak, which is only 1.5 miles (2.4 km) to the south, and the summit is located in the Cloud Peak Wilderness of Bighorn National Forest. The sharp dark profile of the mountain resembles a dark tooth or fang, hence the name. Because of the steep terrain, Black Tooth Mountain is one of the hardest mountains to climb in the Bighorns. Many of the trails up the mountain are unmarked which adds to the difficulty of reaching the summit. Mount Woolsey is an adjacent summit only .20 mi (0.32 km) to the southeast. Another high peak of the Bighorns known as Hallelujah Peak is situated along a knife-like ridge known as an arête .64 mi (1.03 km) to the northeast. Several tiny remnant glaciers can be found on the north slopes of Black Tooth Mountain.

In 1933, the first recorded ascent was made by Warren Gorell (north face on his third attempt) as reported by W. B. Willcox, An American Tyrol, Climbs in the Bighorns 1933, published by American Alpine Club in 1934.
