= Bighorn Peak =

Mountain in the American state of Wyoming

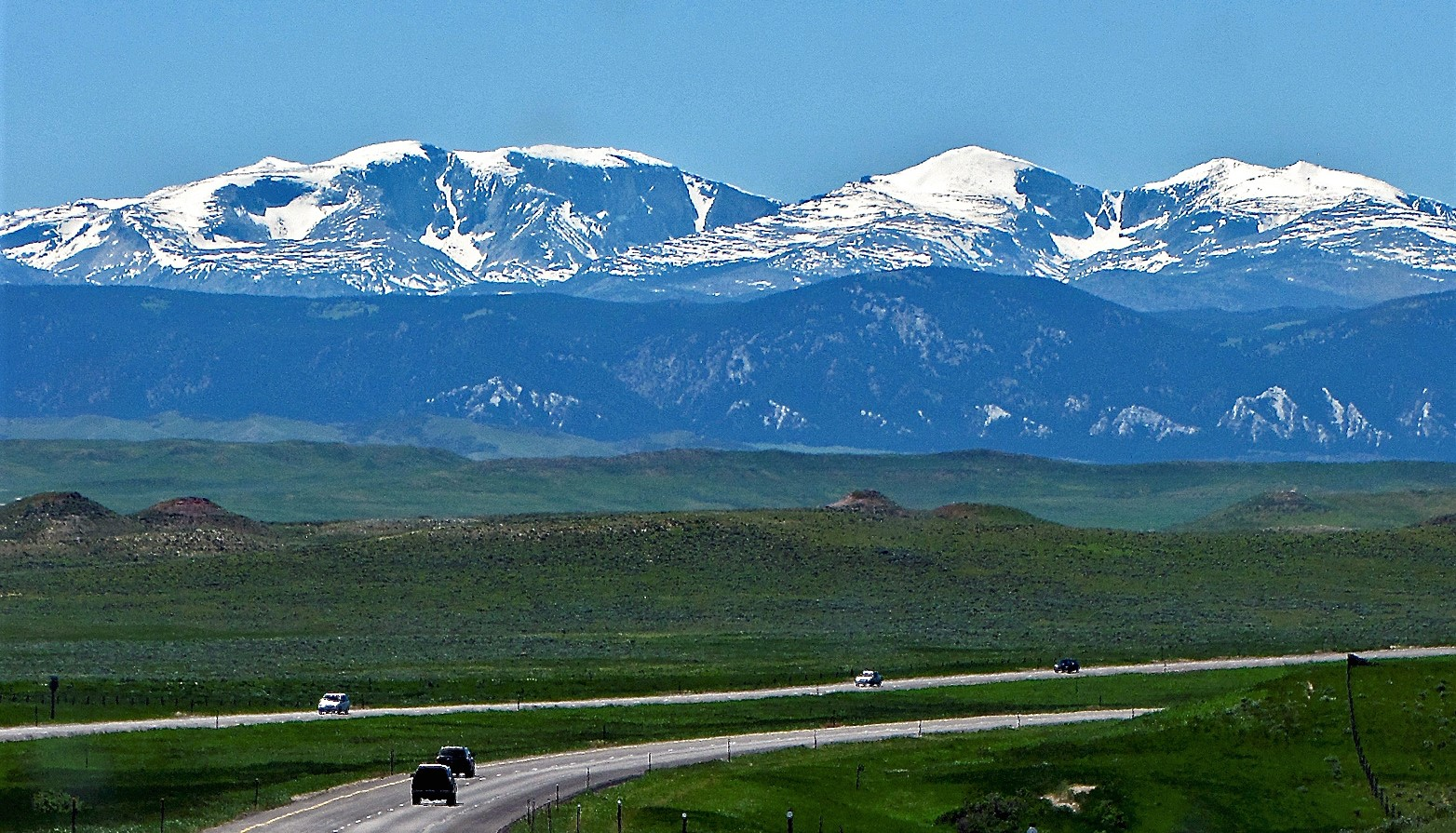
- East aspect (left), from I-90

Highest point
- Elevation: 12,324 ft (3,756 m)
- Prominence: 1,004 ft (306 m)
- Coordinates: 44°15′16″N 107°06′26″W

Geography
- Location within Wyoming Location within the United States
- Location: Johnson County, Wyoming, U.S.
- Parent range: Bighorn Mountains
- Topo map: USGS Lake Angeline

Climbing
- Easiest route: Scramble

Bighorn Peak (12,324 feet (3,756 m)) is located in the Bighorn Mountains in the U.S. state of Wyoming. The peak is the seventh highest in the range and it is in the Cloud Peak Wilderness of Bighorn National Forest. Bighorn Peak is 1.5 miles (2.4 km) south of Darton Peak.

== Climate ==
Climate data for Bighorn Peak 44.2528 N, 107.1109 W, Elevation: 12,005 ft (3,659 m) (1991–2020 normals)
Month	Jan	Feb	Mar	Apr	May	Jun	Jul	Aug	Sep	Oct	Nov	Dec	Year
Mean daily maximum °F (°C)	18.5 (−7.5)	19.5 (−6.9)	25.2 (−3.8)	30.0 (−1.1)	38.9 (3.8)	49.3 (9.6)	58.4 (14.7)	57.4 (14.1)	49.0 (9.4)	36.5 (2.5)	24.3 (−4.3)	18.6 (−7.4)	35.5 (1.9)
Daily mean °F (°C)	9.7 (−12.4)	9.5 (−12.5)	14.0 (−10.0)	18.6 (−7.4)	27.3 (−2.6)	38.0 (3.3)	46.5 (8.1)	44.5 (6.9)	36.6 (2.6)	26.5 (−3.1)	15.3 (−9.3)	9.7 (−12.4)	24.7 (−4.1)
Mean daily minimum °F (°C)	0.9 (−17.3)	−0.4 (−18.0)	2.7 (−16.3)	7.3 (−13.7)	15.8 (−9.0)	26.7 (−2.9)	34.6 (1.4)	31.5 (−0.3)	24.2 (−4.3)	16.4 (−8.7)	6.2 (−14.3)	0.9 (−17.3)	13.9 (−10.1)
Average precipitation inches (mm)	3.03 (77)	2.89 (73)	3.33 (85)	4.59 (117)	4.65 (118)	3.77 (96)	3.02 (77)	1.44 (37)	2.68 (68)	3.62 (92)	2.80 (71)	2.60 (66)	38.42 (977)
Source: PRISM Climate Group
