= Bomber Mountain =

Mountain in Wyoming, United States

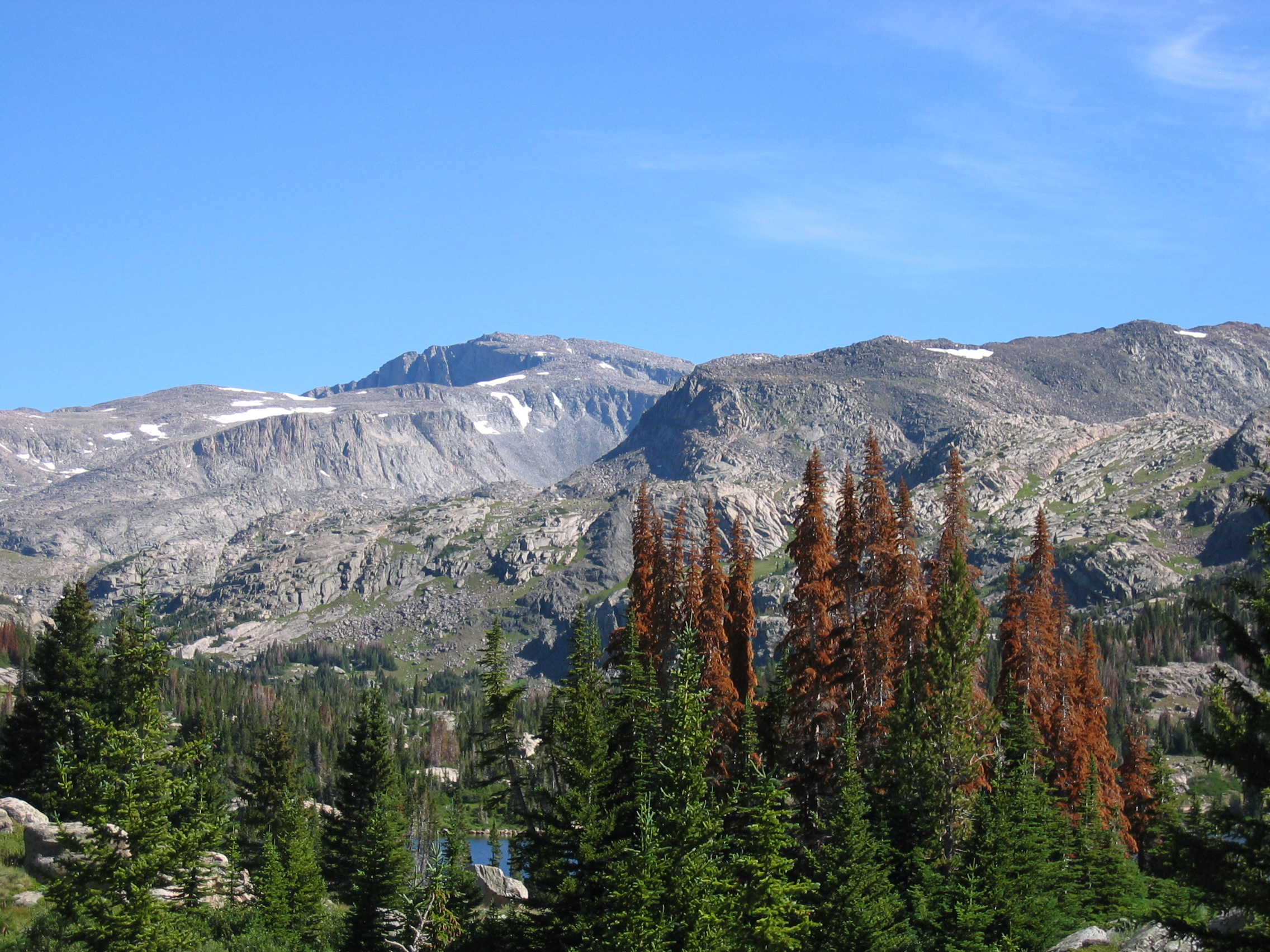
- Cloud Peak (left) and Bomber Mountain (right) as seen from Lake Helen.

Highest point
- Elevation: 12,840+ feet (3914+ m) NGVD 29
- Prominence: 1,120 ft (340 m)
- Coordinates: 44°22′13″N 107°09′21″W

Geography
- Location: Johnson / Big Horn counties, Wyoming, U.S.
- Parent range: Bighorn Mountains
- Topo map: USGS Lake Helen

Bomber Mountain is the crest of a ridge line within the Bighorn Mountains of the U.S. State of Wyoming. It borders the south side of Cloud Peak, the tallest peak in the range. It is about 23 miles (37 km) west of Buffalo. A military aviation accident that occurred upon the mountain in 1943 led to it being named Bomber Mountain in 1946.

== Climate ==
Climate data for Bomber Mountain 44.3582 N, 107.1732 W, Elevation: 12,175 ft (3,711 m) (1991–2020 normals)
Month	Jan	Feb	Mar	Apr	May	Jun	Jul	Aug	Sep	Oct	Nov	Dec	Year
Mean daily maximum °F (°C)	18.3 (−7.6)	18.7 (−7.4)	25.1 (−3.8)	29.2 (−1.6)	38.2 (3.4)	48.7 (9.3)	57.8 (14.3)	56.8 (13.8)	48.3 (9.1)	35.7 (2.1)	24.3 (−4.3)	17.9 (−7.8)	34.9 (1.6)
Daily mean °F (°C)	8.8 (−12.9)	8.0 (−13.3)	13.4 (−10.3)	17.7 (−7.9)	26.4 (−3.1)	36.0 (2.2)	44.4 (6.9)	43.7 (6.5)	35.7 (2.1)	24.7 (−4.1)	15.0 (−9.4)	8.7 (−12.9)	23.5 (−4.7)
Mean daily minimum °F (°C)	−0.7 (−18.2)	−2.7 (−19.3)	1.8 (−16.8)	6.2 (−14.3)	14.6 (−9.7)	23.4 (−4.8)	31.0 (−0.6)	30.6 (−0.8)	23.2 (−4.9)	13.8 (−10.1)	5.8 (−14.6)	−0.4 (−18.0)	12.2 (−11.0)
Average precipitation inches (mm)	3.57 (91)	3.41 (87)	3.86 (98)	4.97 (126)	5.20 (132)	4.54 (115)	2.67 (68)	1.46 (37)	3.15 (80)	3.78 (96)	3.37 (86)	3.03 (77)	43.01 (1,093)
Source: PRISM Climate Group

== 1943 air accident ==
On 28 June 1943, a B-17F-55-DL Flying Fortress, serial number 42-3399, nicknamed "Scharazad", departed Pendleton Army Air Base in Pendleton, Oregon destined for Grand Island, Nebraska. From there, the bomber would join the other members of the 383d Bomb Group and continue to England to participate in the ongoing World War II bombing campaigns. Around midnight, the captain radioed that their position was near Powder River, Wyoming. They were not heard from again. After they failed to arrive in Grand Island, the plane was declared missing and the Army mounted a search effort with no results. A second search was conducted the following year, concentrating on the Wind River Range, Absaroka Range and Bighorn Mountains, but still no wreckage was spotted.

On 12 August 1945, two cowboys spotted something shiny on a ridge line in the Cloud Peak area of the Big Horn Mountains. They discovered the wreckage and the deceased crew, and contacted authorities, who conducted an operation to recover the bodies of the crew and return them to their families. It was believed that during earlier search efforts, the paint color of the aircraft blended in closely with the mountain side, making the wreckage difficult to spot. After a few years, the paint wore off, and the shiny aluminum underneath made the plane more visible. No official cause for the crash was ever determined, but it is presumed that malfunctioning navigational equipment, and a moonless night combined with bad weather caused the pilot to not see the ridge until it was too late.

After a petition by veterans groups in Wyoming, the previously unnamed ridge was christened Bomber Mountain on 22 August 1946 by the U.S. Forest Service. In honor of the crew members, a commemorative plaque was placed on the shores of Florence Lake, 1.5 miles (2.4 km) from the crash site.

The crew included:

- William R. Ronaghan (pilot)
- Anthony J. Tilotta (co-pilot)
- Leonard H. Phillips (navigator)
- Charles H. Suppes (bombardier)
- James A. Hinds (aircraft engineer)
- Ferguson T. Bell, Jr. (radio operator)
- Lee 'Vaughn' Miller (assistant aircraft engineer)
- Charles E. Newburn, Jr (assistant radio operator)
- Jake F. Penick (aircraft gunner)
- Lewis M. Shepard (assistant aircraft gunner)
