= Cloud Peak Glacier =

Glacier in Wyoming, U.S.

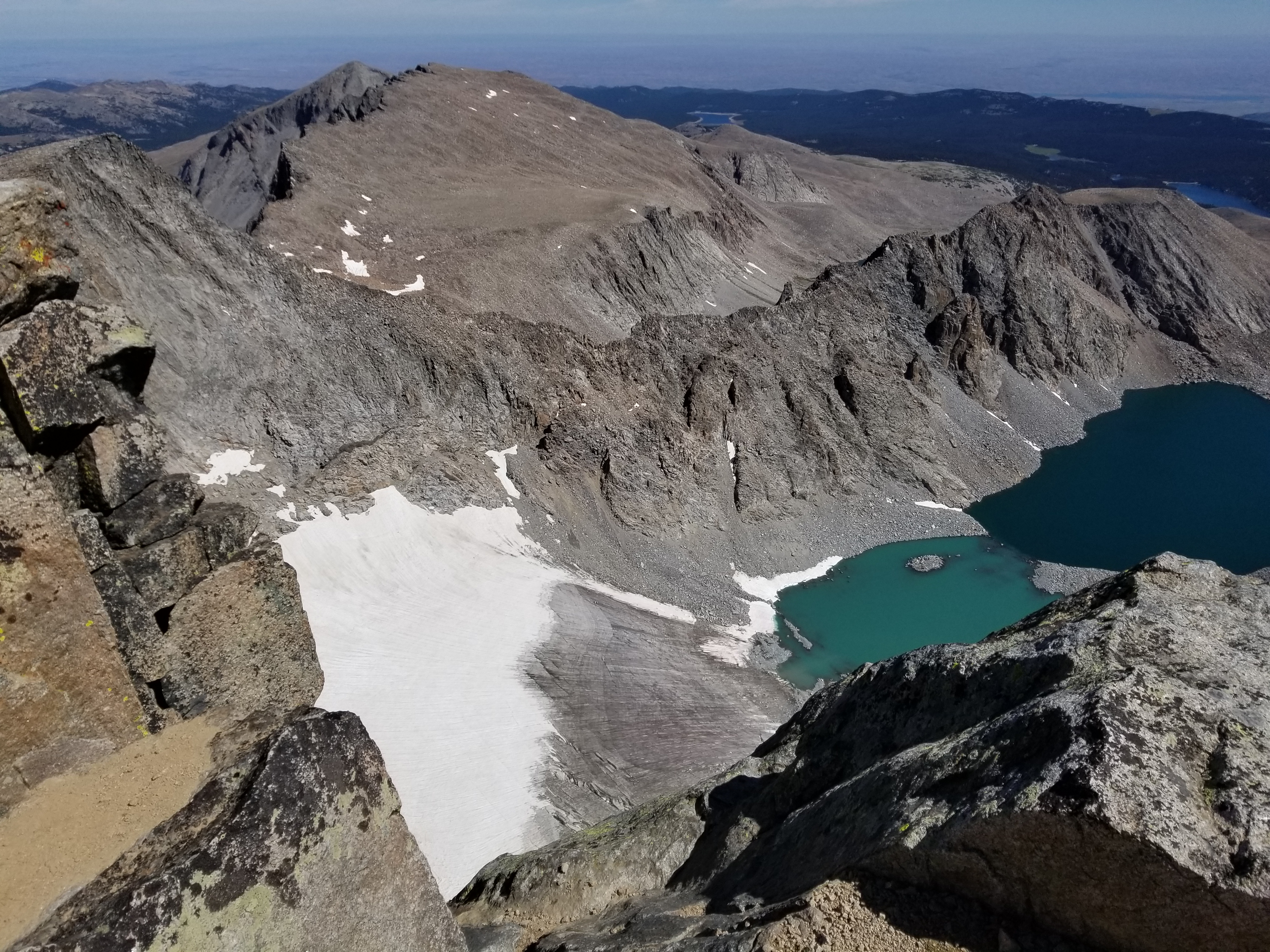
- Cloud Peak Glacier viewed from the summit of Cloud Peak

- Location within Wyoming
- Type: Mountain glacier
- Location: Johnson County, Wyoming, USA (Bighorn Mountains)
- Coordinates: 44°23′11″N 107°10′06″W
- Area: 55 acres (22 ha)
- Length: .30 mi (0.48 km)
- Width: .30 mi (0.48 km)
- Terminus: Scree, Proglacial lake
- Status: Retreating

Cloud Peak Glacier is in the Bighorn Mountains in the northcentral section of the U.S. state of Wyoming. Centered within the Cloud Peak Wilderness of Bighorn National Forest, Cloud Peak Glacier is the only active glacier in the Bighorn Mountains. The glacier is in a deep cirque immediately northeast of Cloud Peak, the highest peak in the Bighorn Mountains. Cloud Peak Glacier lies at approximately 11,800 feet (3,600 m) above sea level.

Cloud Peak Glacier is retreating rapidly and is expected to disappear entirely sometime between the years 2020 and 2034. Photographs taken in 1905 and again in 2005 demonstrated an obvious reduction in the area the glacier, and more ominously, a huge loss of thickness. Between 1905 and 2005, the glacier has been reduced in size from an estimated 506,000,000 cubic feet (14,300,000 m^{3}) to 78,000,000 cubic feet (2,200,000 m^{3}).

== See also ==
- Retreat of glaciers since 1850
- List of glaciers in the United States
