= Cloud Peak =

Mountain in Wyoming, United States

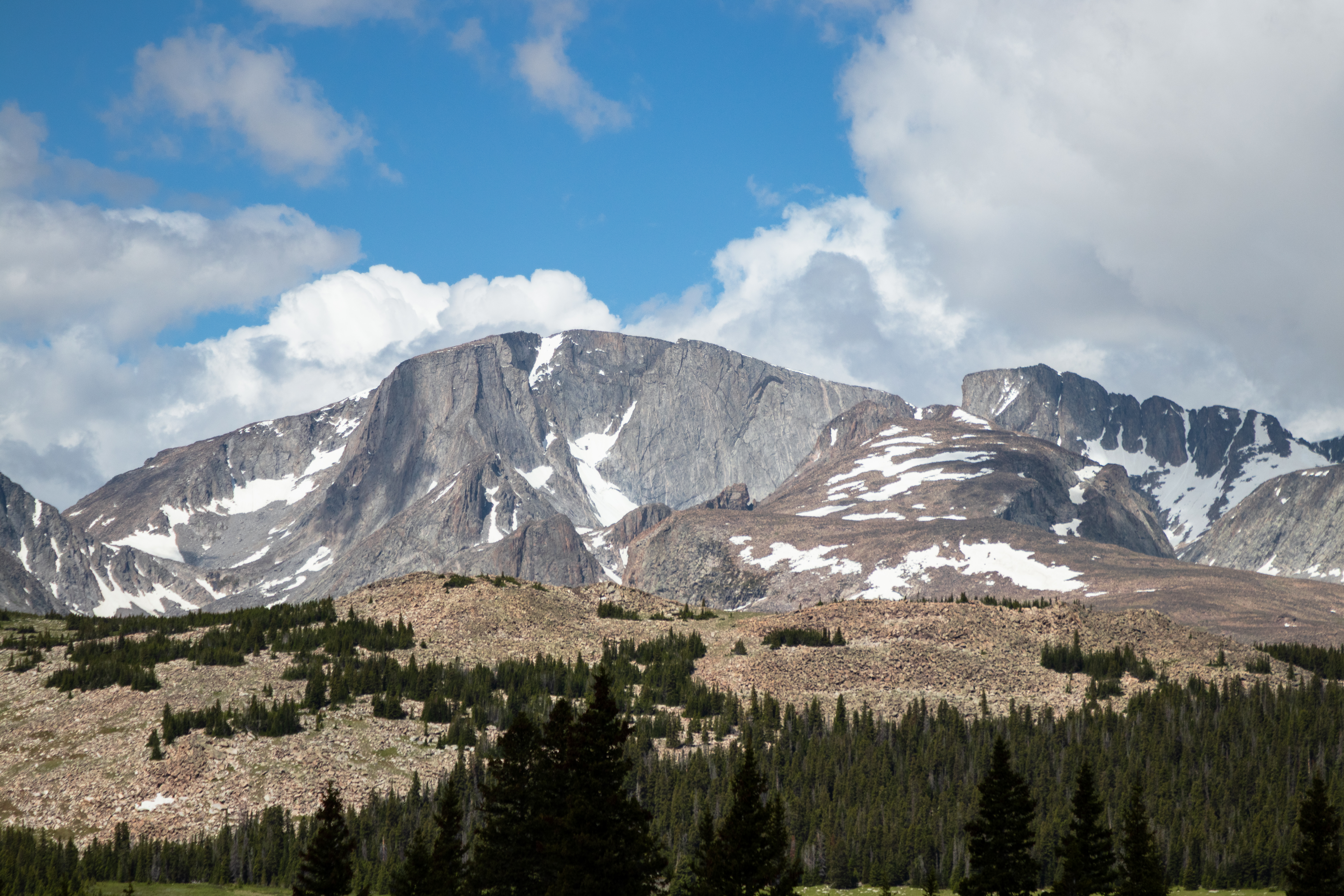
- Cloud Peak, from the Clear Creek Drainage

Highest point
- Elevation: 13,171 ft (4,015 m)
- Prominence: 7,067 ft (2,154 m)
- Listing: North America highest peaks 117th; North America prominent peaks 73rd; North America isolated peaks 84th; US highest major peaks 98th
- Coordinates: 44°22′56″N 107°10′26″W

Geography
- Location within Wyoming
- Location: Big Horn / Johnson counties, Wyoming, U.S.
- Parent range: Bighorn Mountains
- Topo map: USGS Cloud Peak

Climbing
- First ascent: 1897
- Easiest route: Hike/scramble

Cloud Peak is a 13,171 feet (4,015 m) mountain located in the Bighorn Mountains in the U.S. state of Wyoming. The highest peak of that range, it lies within the 189,000-acre (765 km^{2}) Cloud Peak Wilderness within Bighorn National Forest.

== Location ==
Cloud Peak is on the border between Johnson County and Big Horn County in Wyoming and is the high point of both counties. As the high point of an isolated range, Cloud Peak has the greatest topographic prominence in the state, 7,077 feet (2,157 m), one foot more than the state's highest mountain, 13,810 foot (4,210 m) Gannett Peak, and fifteenth greatest in the contiguous United States.

== Climbing ==
Cloud Peak can be climbed most easily from the western side, accessed by either the Battle Park or West Tensleep trailheads, which both form 24-mile (39 km) round trips from the peak. The northeast slope is a deep cirque which harbors Cloud Peak Glacier, the last active glacier in the Bighorn Mountains.

== Climate ==
Cloud Peak has an Alpine climate (ET).

Climate data for Cloud Peak 44.3831 N, 107.1748 W, Elevation: 12,654 ft (3,857 m) (1991–2020 normals)
Month	Jan	Feb	Mar	Apr	May	Jun	Jul	Aug	Sep	Oct	Nov	Dec	Year
Mean daily maximum °F (°C)	16.6 (−8.6)	16.9 (−8.4)	23.2 (−4.9)	27.7 (−2.4)	36.6 (2.6)	46.9 (8.3)	56.0 (13.3)	54.9 (12.7)	46.6 (8.1)	34.2 (1.2)	22.7 (−5.2)	16.2 (−8.8)	33.2 (0.7)
Daily mean °F (°C)	7.8 (−13.4)	7.2 (−13.8)	12.8 (−10.7)	17.5 (−8.1)	26.3 (−3.2)	36.1 (2.3)	44.2 (6.8)	43.0 (6.1)	35.4 (1.9)	24.3 (−4.3)	14.3 (−9.8)	7.6 (−13.6)	23.0 (−5.0)
Mean daily minimum °F (°C)	−1.1 (−18.4)	−2.5 (−19.2)	2.5 (−16.4)	7.2 (−13.8)	16.0 (−8.9)	25.2 (−3.8)	32.5 (0.3)	31.1 (−0.5)	24.1 (−4.4)	14.5 (−9.7)	5.9 (−14.5)	−1.1 (−18.4)	12.9 (−10.6)
Average precipitation inches (mm)	3.47 (88)	3.23 (82)	3.78 (96)	5.26 (134)	5.59 (142)	4.40 (112)	2.63 (67)	1.60 (41)	3.19 (81)	3.98 (101)	3.24 (82)	2.87 (73)	43.24 (1,099)
Source: PRISM Climate Group

Cloud Peak Reservoir is a mountain lake below Cloud Peak on its eastern slopes. The weather station there has a subalpine climate (Köppen Dfc).

Climate data for Cloud Peak Reservoir, Wyoming, 1991–2020 normals, extremes 1989–present, elev. 9860ft (3005m)
Month	Jan	Feb	Mar	Apr	May	Jun	Jul	Aug	Sep	Oct	Nov	Dec	Year
Record high °F (°C)	58 (14)	58 (14)	61 (16)	67 (19)	69 (21)	80 (27)	81 (27)	81 (27)	78 (26)	70 (21)	64 (18)	55 (13)	81 (27)
Mean maximum °F (°C)	48.5 (9.2)	47.6 (8.7)	52.8 (11.6)	58.0 (14.4)	63.3 (17.4)	70.0 (21.1)	75.6 (24.2)	74.1 (23.4)	70.6 (21.4)	62.4 (16.9)	53.7 (12.1)	46.6 (8.1)	76.5 (24.7)
Mean daily maximum °F (°C)	30.1 (−1.1)	31.0 (−0.6)	37.7 (3.2)	41.7 (5.4)	49.4 (9.7)	57.5 (14.2)	65.2 (18.4)	64.2 (17.9)	56.4 (13.6)	45.3 (7.4)	35.9 (2.2)	29.2 (−1.6)	45.3 (7.4)
Daily mean °F (°C)	18.5 (−7.5)	17.9 (−7.8)	24.2 (−4.3)	28.9 (−1.7)	37.7 (3.2)	45.7 (7.6)	52.4 (11.3)	51.3 (10.7)	44.1 (6.7)	33.5 (0.8)	24.1 (−4.4)	17.2 (−8.2)	33.0 (0.5)
Mean daily minimum °F (°C)	7.0 (−13.9)	4.8 (−15.1)	10.6 (−11.9)	16.1 (−8.8)	25.9 (−3.4)	33.8 (1.0)	39.6 (4.2)	38.3 (3.5)	31.7 (−0.2)	21.8 (−5.7)	12.3 (−10.9)	5.3 (−14.8)	20.6 (−6.3)
Mean minimum °F (°C)	−16.2 (−26.8)	−19.3 (−28.5)	−11.3 (−24.1)	−4.5 (−20.3)	7.6 (−13.6)	24.1 (−4.4)	31.9 (−0.1)	29.6 (−1.3)	17.7 (−7.9)	−1.1 (−18.4)	−12.7 (−24.8)	−20.1 (−28.9)	−26.1 (−32.3)
Record low °F (°C)	−39 (−39)	−33 (−36)	−33 (−36)	−21 (−29)	−7 (−22)	13 (−11)	25 (−4)	19 (−7)	2 (−17)	−25 (−32)	−29 (−34)	−39 (−39)	−39 (−39)
Average precipitation inches (mm)	1.70 (43)	1.81 (46)	2.83 (72)	4.17 (106)	4.84 (123)	2.78 (71)	2.04 (52)	1.44 (37)	2.36 (60)	3.04 (77)	1.88 (48)	1.67 (42)	30.56 (777)
Average extreme snow depth inches (cm)	38.6 (98)	47.3 (120)	59.5 (151)	63.7 (162)	58.5 (149)	24.3 (62)	0.0 (0.0)	0.0 (0.0)	4.7 (12)	11.4 (29)	21.0 (53)	29.9 (76)	69.1 (176)
Average precipitation days (≥ 0.01 in)	9.9	10.2	13.3	17.3	15.9	11.2	9.0	7.5	9.1	12.1	9.7	9.4	134.6
Source 1: XMACIS2 (snow depth 2006–2020)
Source 2: NOAA (Precipitation)

== See also ==
- 4000 meter peaks of North America
- Central Rocky Mountains
- Mountain peaks of North America
- Mountain peaks of the Rocky Mountains
- Mountain peaks of the United States
- List of Ultras of North America
- List of Ultras of the United States
