= William B. Willcox =

American historian (1907–85)

- Born: William Bradford Willcox; October 29, 1907; Ithaca, New York, U.S.
- Died: September 15, 1985 (aged 77); North Haven, Connecticut, U.S.
- Occupation: Professor of History
- Parent: Walter Francis Willcox

William Bradford Willcox (October 29, 1907 – September 15, 1985) was an American historian.

He was born in Ithaca, New York. He died in North Haven, Connecticut.

Education: He received his B.A. from Cornell University in 1928 and studied at Cambridge University. At Yale University he studied architecture (B.F.A., 1932), and Tudor-Stuart English history (Ph.D.,1936). Wallace Notestein directed his dissertation, which was recognized as a pioneer study of government in Gloucestershire. The work received the distinguished John Addison Porter Prize for best work of scholarship in a given year.

Academic, research, and administrative appointments: Assistant in Research (history), Yale University, 1934–1935. Instructor in history, Williams College, 1936–1941. Professor of history, University of Michigan, 1941–1970. Chair of the department. A Member of the Institute for Advanced Studies, 1946. Fulbright lecturer at Oxford University, 1957–1958. Professor of History, Yale University, January 1970-June 1976. Visiting Lecturer, Yale College (Residential Colleges), 1978 2nd term-1979. Yale residential college fellow, Calhoun College, 1970–1979. Editor, Papers of Benjamin Franklin, January 1970 – 1985.

== Awards ==
- 1936 John Addison Porter Prize, Yale University
- c.1938. 1900 Fund at Williams College for research on Gloucestershire.
- 1945. Henry Russel Award, University of Michigan, for his book, Star of Empire.
- 1965 Bancroft Prize for his Portrait of a General (the prize has been generally considered to be among the most prestigious awards in the field of American history writing).

== Works ==
- Willcox, William B. Gloucestershire, a study in local government, 1590-1640. Yale University Press, 1940.
- Willcox, William B. Star of Empire - A Study of Britain as a World Power 1485-1945. Knopf, 1950.
- Clinton, Sir Henry. Sir Henry Clinton, The American rebellion: Sir Henry Clinton's narrative of his campaigns, 1775-1782, with an appendix of original documents. William B. Willcox, ed. Yale University Press, 1954.
- Willcox, William B. Portrait of a General. Sir Henry Clinton in the War for Independence. Knopf, 1964.
- William B. Willcox. The Age of Aristocracy 1688 to 1830. Houghton Mifflin, 1966.
- Franklin, Benjamin. The papers of Benjamin Franklin. Edited by William B. Willcox and others, Volumes 15–26. Yale University Press, 1972–1987.
