= Cloud Peak Wilderness =

Protected area in Wyoming, United States

- IUCN category Ib (wilderness area)
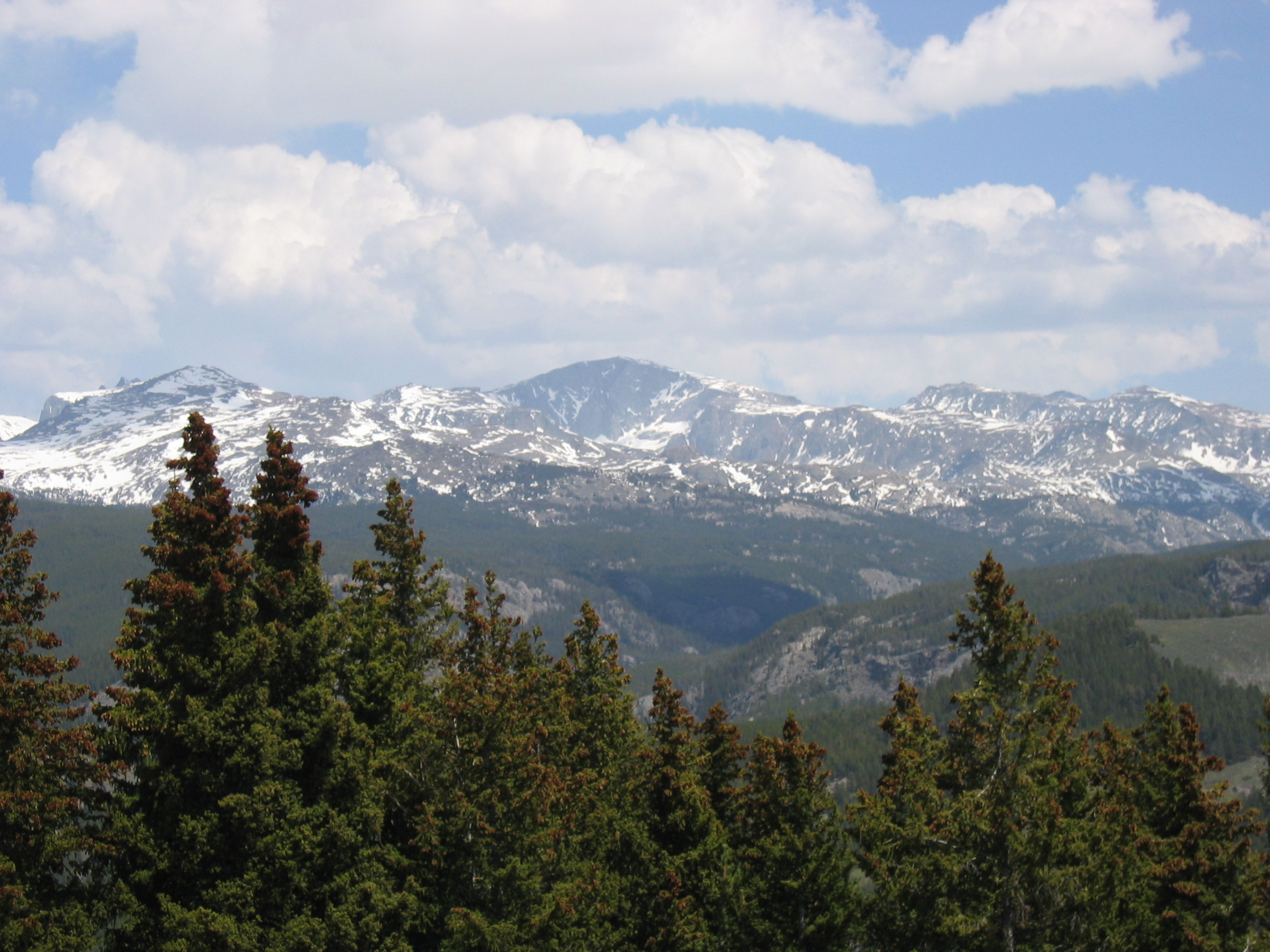
- Cloud Peak Wilderness, as viewed from Freezout, off Cold Springs Road.

- Location within Wyoming Location within the United States
- Location: Johnson / Big Horn / Sheridan counties, Wyoming, USA
- Nearest city: Sheridan, WY
- Coordinates: 44°23′55″N 107°12′07″W
- Area: 189,039 acres (765.01 km^{2})
- Established: 1984
- Governing body: U.S. Forest Service

The Cloud Peak Wilderness is located in north central Wyoming in the United States. Entirely within Bighorn National Forest, the wilderness was established in 1984 in an effort to preserve the wildest section of the Bighorn Mountains. The wilderness has the highest peaks in the Bighorn Mountains, including Cloud Peak and Black Tooth Mountain, as well as Cloud Peak Glacier, the only remaining active glacier in the Bighorn Mountains. The Cloud Peak Wilderness is 189,039 acres (765.01 km^{2}).

U.S. Wilderness Areas do not allow motorized or mechanized vehicles, including bicycles. Although camping and fishing are allowed with a proper permit, no roads or buildings are constructed, and there is also no logging or mining, in compliance with the 1964 Wilderness Act. Wilderness areas within National Forests and Bureau of Land Management areas also allow hunting in season.

== Climate ==
Climate data for Shell Creek, Wyoming, 1991–2020 normals: 9580ft (2920m)
Month	Jan	Feb	Mar	Apr	May	Jun	Jul	Aug	Sep	Oct	Nov	Dec	Year
Mean daily maximum °F (°C)	22.0 (−5.6)	22.9 (−5.1)	30.8 (−0.7)	37.9 (3.3)	47.1 (8.4)	56.4 (13.6)	65.9 (18.8)	63.9 (17.7)	52.8 (11.6)	38.6 (3.7)	27.9 (−2.3)	21.2 (−6.0)	40.6 (4.8)
Daily mean °F (°C)	14.8 (−9.6)	14.8 (−9.6)	21.6 (−5.8)	27.9 (−2.3)	37.2 (2.9)	45.7 (7.6)	54.1 (12.3)	52.6 (11.4)	43.4 (6.3)	30.9 (−0.6)	20.5 (−6.4)	14.2 (−9.9)	31.5 (−0.3)
Mean daily minimum °F (°C)	7.5 (−13.6)	6.7 (−14.1)	12.4 (−10.9)	17.9 (−7.8)	27.4 (−2.6)	35.0 (1.7)	42.3 (5.7)	41.3 (5.2)	33.9 (1.1)	23.2 (−4.9)	13.1 (−10.5)	7.1 (−13.8)	22.3 (−5.4)
Average precipitation inches (mm)	2.21 (56)	2.01 (51)	2.39 (61)	3.21 (82)	3.55 (90)	3.26 (83)	1.52 (39)	1.16 (29)	2.31 (59)	2.57 (65)	2.15 (55)	1.77 (45)	28.11 (715)
Source 1: XMACIS2
Source 2: NOAA (Precipitation)

Climate data for Cloud Peak Wilderness
Month	Jan	Feb	Mar	Apr	May	Jun	Jul	Aug	Sep	Oct	Nov	Dec	Year
Mean daily maximum °F (°C)	35.6 (2.0)	40.4 (4.7)	49.7 (9.8)	59.2 (15.1)	69.2 (20.7)	79.0 (26.1)	86.7 (30.4)	85.6 (29.8)	75.1 (23.9)	62.3 (16.8)	45.2 (7.3)	37.4 (3.0)	60.5 (15.8)
Daily mean °F (°C)	24.7 (−4.1)	29.4 (−1.4)	38.1 (3.4)	46.7 (8.2)	56.1 (13.4)	65.5 (18.6)	72.6 (22.6)	71.7 (22.1)	61.6 (16.4)	50.0 (10.0)	35.4 (1.9)	26.9 (−2.8)	48.2 (9.0)
Mean daily minimum °F (°C)	13.7 (−10.2)	18.4 (−7.6)	26.5 (−3.1)	34.2 (1.2)	43.0 (6.1)	51.9 (11.1)	58.4 (14.7)	57.9 (14.4)	48.0 (8.9)	37.6 (3.1)	25.5 (−3.6)	16.4 (−8.7)	36.0 (2.2)
Average precipitation inches (mm)	0.5 (13)	0.3 (7.6)	0.9 (23)	1.3 (33)	2.3 (58)	1.8 (46)	0.9 (23)	0.6 (15)	1.4 (36)	1.2 (30)	0.7 (18)	0.6 (15)	12.5 (317.6)
Source: climbingweather.com

== See also ==
- List of U.S. Wilderness Areas
