= Bighorn Mountains =

Mountain range in Wyoming and Montana, United States

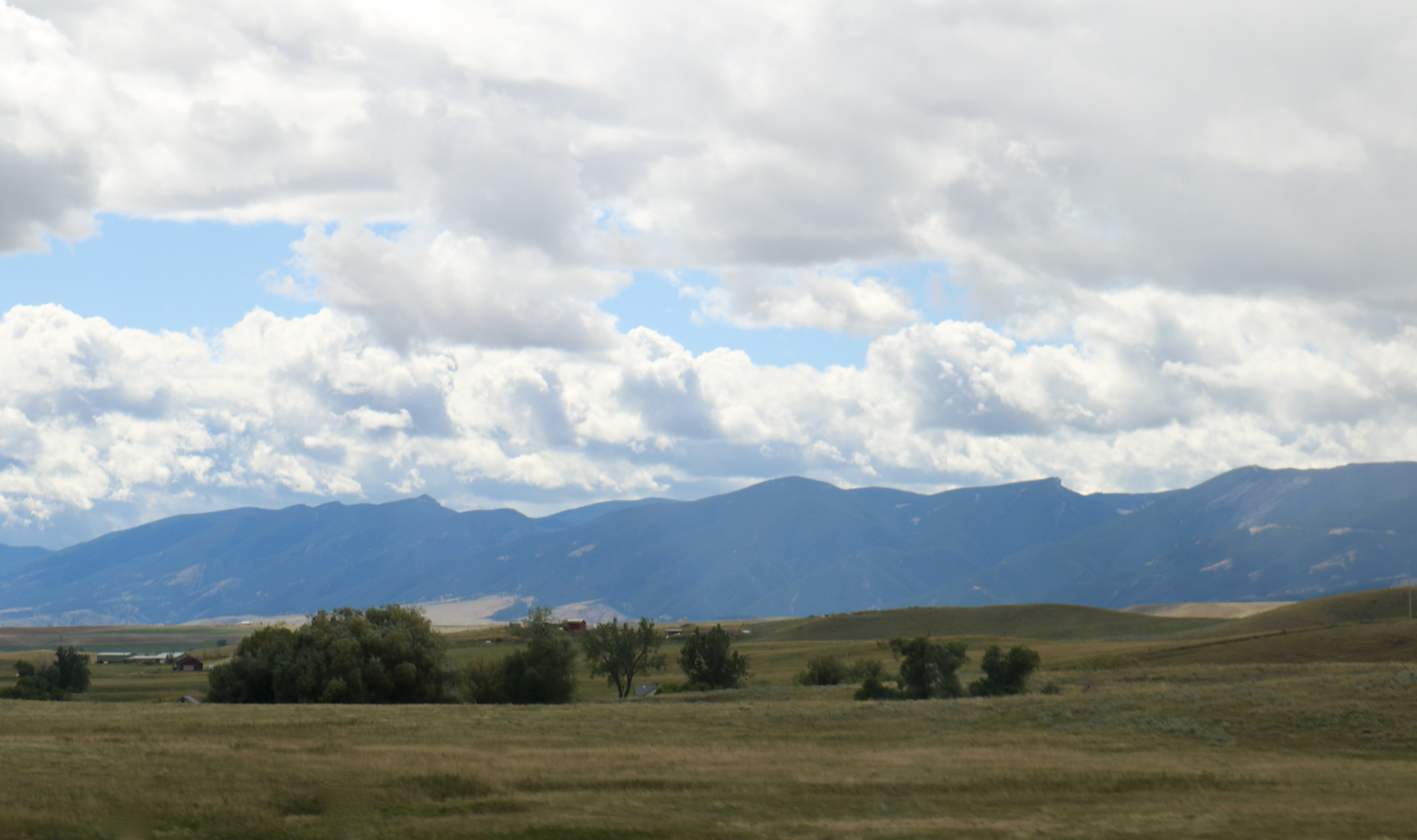
- Big Horn range in Northern Wyoming

Highest point
- Peak: Cloud Peak
- Elevation: 13,171 ft (4,015 m)
- Coordinates: 44°22′56″N 107°10′32″W

Geography
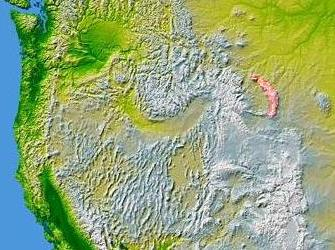
- The Bighorns are shown highlighted in red in the western United States
- Country: United States
- States: Wyoming; Montana
- Parent range: Rocky Mountains
- Borders on: Absaroka Range

Geology
- Orogeny: Laramide orogeny

The Bighorn Mountains (Crow: Basawaxaawúua, lit. 'our mountains' or Iisaxpúatahchee Isawaxaawúua, 'bighorn sheep's mountains') are a mountain range in northern Wyoming and southern Montana in the United States, forming a northwest-trending spur from the Rocky Mountains extending approximately 200 mi (320 km) northward on the Great Plains. They are separated from the Absaroka Range, which lie on the main branch of the Rockies to the west, by the Bighorn Basin. Much of the land is contained within the Bighorn National Forest.

== Geology ==
The Bighorns were uplifted during the Laramide orogeny beginning approximately 70 million years ago. They consist of over 9,000 ft (2,700 m) of sedimentary rock strata laid down before mountain-building began: the predominantly marine and near-shore sedimentary layers range from the Cambrian through the Lower Cretaceous, and are often rich in fossils. There is an unconformity where Silurian strata were exposed to erosion and are missing. The granite bedrock below these sedimentary layers is now exposed along the crest of the Bighorns. The Precambrian formations contain some of the oldest rocks in the world, at 3.25 billion years old. Following the uplift, large volumes of sediments, rich in early Tertiary fossils, were deposited in the adjoining basins. The ice ages of the Pleistocene led to extensive glaciation. Though many cirques, U-shaped valleys and glacial lakes can be found in the mountain range, the only remaining active glacier is the Cloud Peak Glacier, which is on the east slope of Cloud Peak.

Geologist N.H. Darton with the U.S. Geological Survey produced one of the earliest studies of geology in the area, drawn from field research from 1901 to 1905.

Despite extensive prospecting in the Bighorns, no major deposits of precious metals have been found to date. Brief gold rushes of placer deposits occurred at Bald Mountain City and Porcupine Creek, and in Big Goose Canyon. The lack of precious metals helped stave off development and settlement in the mountains, in contrast to the Colorado Rockies.

The Madison limestone aquifer provides a significant source of groundwater for the town of Dayton. Limestone karst formations throughout the range contain many fissures and cracks that have developed into extensive cave systems, including Tongue River Cave, and the caves adjacent to Medicine Mountain. The Natural Trap Cave on the west slope of the Bighorns contains numerous remains of prehistoric mammals.

== Geography ==
The highest peaks within the Bighorns are located in Wyoming in the 1,120,000-acre (4,500 km^{2}) Bighorn National Forest. Two peaks rise to over 13,000 ft: Cloud Peak (13,171 ft, 4,015 m) and Black Tooth Mountain (13,009 ft, 3,965 m). There are a dozen more that rise to over 12,000 feet (3,700 m). From the east the mountains present a vertical relief of over 8,000 feet (2,400 m), rising abruptly from the plains. Overall, the Bighorns are more rounded than their sister mountain ranges to the west.

The Cloud Peak Wilderness is the centerpiece of a roadless block of land around 189,000 acres in size. The Wilderness is surrounded by acreage of U.S National Forest as well as Bureau of Land Management, state, and some private land. Most of the Cloud Peak Wilderness is above the tree line; the National Forest lands surrounding it are lower in elevation and covered in coniferous forests. Mule deer, elk, moose, black bear, and mountain lion are found throughout the area.

Two more large roadless areas remained in the Bighorns as of 1992. It is unknown whether these areas have since been reduced in size by road-building and other development. Both areas straddle the Montana-Wyoming state line, in the northern part of the range. One area, north of U.S. Route 14A and containing the headwaters of the Little Bighorn River, is 155,000 acres of National Forest land. This little-known region features subalpine terrain cut by steep canyons. Pronghorn inhabit the area, as it includes a portion of the Great Plains. What little human use it receives is from hunters and fishermen. The second roadless area is located mainly on the Crow Indian Reservation in Montana; its area of 144,000 acres also includes 34,000 acres of Devil's Canyon on the Bighorn N.F. in Wyoming. In this part of the range, semidesert prairie is cut by steep canyons leading to Yellowtail Reservoir, and high, Douglas-fir cloaked ridges top out at over 9,000'. Colorful rock formations are common. Rocky Mountain juniper and limber pine are scattered on lower elevations, and wildlife includes pronghorn, rattlesnake, golden eagle, ferruginous hawk, and mule deer. The Crow Indians manage a wild bison herd on this portion of the Bighorns. The Crow lands are a sacred area, and thus are off-limits to non-tribal members.

The three highways traversing the Bighorns are designated Scenic Byways by the US Forest Service and the State of Wyoming. These include U.S. Routes 14, 14A, and 16.

The high elevation of the Bighorns results in condensation of air and significant yearly snowfall, creating a highland oasis of moisture towering over the otherwise arid plains that surround the range in all directions. The melting snow feeds many rivers through the summer months. The range is the location of the headwaters of the Little Bighorn, Tongue, and Powder rivers.

Bighorn Canyon National Recreation Area consists of approximately 120,000 acres (490 km^{2}) within the Bighorn Mountains. It includes Bighorn Lake, a reservoir damming the Bighorn River.

In 2015, a sudden, huge 'gash' was found in Wyoming's Big Horn Mountains. The Wyoming Geological Survey studied the area and determined that "The Crack" may be the result of an "apparent active landslide" in the southern end of the Big Horn Mountains.

== Archaeology and American Indian history ==
The Bighorns provided important resources for ancestral indigenous people, including plants, migratory big game, rock shelters, tepee poles, and stone for tools. American Indian trails crisscrossed the range, while the canyons provided important winter shelters. Stone game blinds in the high country were used by pedestrian hunters to kill migratory big game animals with atlatl-propelled spears or bows. The northern Bighorns and the Tongue River drainage were formerly a significant summer range for migratory bison that wintered in either the Bighorn Basin and the Powder River/Tongue River/Little Bighorn River drainages. The southern Bighorns, particularly in the Middle Fork of the Powder River, contained an important American Indian trail adjacent to a bison migration corridor. The Wilson Price Hunt expedition of Astorians noted in 1811 that the bison dung was so dense in this area that it resembled a "continuous barnyard" for several miles. Hunt noticed Shoshone and Crow Indians in the area. The Medicine Wheel on the northern end of the Bighorns is an important sacred site built by ancestral tribes that is still used in present-day American Indian ceremonies.

Ancestors of the Shoshone Tribe likely had the longest continuous association with the Bighorns, potentially dating back 1,000 years or more. Stone artifacts found in the Absaroka Range farther west are known to have originated in the Bighorns, suggesting ancestral movement between the two ranges.

The Apsalooke or Crow tribe located in this region about 300–400 years ago after discovering the sacred tobacco plant growing in the Bighorn Mountains below Cloud Peak. This ended a multi-generational sojourn that began near Devils Lake, North Dakota, where a leader named No Vitals received a vision to seek the tobacco. The Crow chief Arapooish gave a speech in the 1830s showing that his people were fully aware of the migratory behaviors of bighorn sheep and deer, which spent summer on high-elevation summer range in the Bighorns and other mountain ranges.

Cheyenne, Arapaho, and Lakota use of the Bighorns region mostly dates to the period after 1800, when they made incursions into traditional Shoshone and Crow territory. Of the Cheyenne, Arapaho and Lakota, the Arapaho had longest history on the east slope of the Rocky Mountains in a region spanning from the Yellowstone River to the Arkansas River, which included the Bighorns. The Cheyenne and Lakota were originally agricultural tribes based on rivers of the Great Plains and the Midwest. By the 1860s and 1870s, the Lakota showed a knowledge of the ancestral trail systems in the Bighorn Mountains, particularly in incidents like the Sibley Fight.

== Origins of name ==
The Bighorn Mountains are named for the Bighorn River, which originated with the Crow. According to Crow oral tradition, shortly after the Crow located in this region after discovering the sacred tobacco, a stepfather pushed his son off the rim of a canyon, intending to do him harm. The boy was caught in juniper trees and survived for four days, until he was rescued by the seven sacred bighorn rams. The largest of these rams was chief of all the bighorns. This ram had horns of metal, and was called "Big Metal". This ram implored the boy that the name of the river was the Bighorn River, and told the boy that if the name of the Bighorn River was ever changed, the Crow tribe would cease to exist. The name of the river became the basis for naming the Bighorn Mountains.

Many peaks of the region were named by the Crow, including Sheep Mountain Chíilapalawaache (where the bighorn ram sits), Medicine Mountain Awaxaammaaxpée (Holy Mountain), the crest divide of the Bighorns Awaxahátchke (Long Mountain), Bald Mountain Awaxaawammáakoo(2) (High Mountain). The highest peak of the range, Cloud Peak, is Awaxaawakússawishe, meaning extended mountain.

The word "Bighorn Mountains" were also used by the Arapaho or Cheyenne: both tribes called today's Bighorn River "Mountain Sheep River," and it was common to name mountain ranges after nearby rivers. The Cheyenne term for the Bighorn Mountains is Ma'xekȯsáeho'honáéva with the element kȯsáeho meaning bighorn sheep. The Arapaho also called the Bighorn Mountains Houuneniinoho'oooyoo' meaning "Crow Tribe Mountain Range," an indication of the Crow's use of the area in the 1800s. The Lakota word for the Bighorns is Ȟeyúškiška meaning "Rugged mountain ridge" or "rough animal horns." The traditional Gros Ventre name is síisííyaačyɔʔɔ́tah, 'snake butte', and ʔɔ́tééíh ʔɔhʔániih, 'sheep mountains' is a modern translation.

Overhunting of bighorn sheep, and livestock diseases and parasites introduced from domestic sheep grazing largely wiped out the native population of bighorn sheep by the early 1900s. Today the only herd of bighorn sheep in the namesake range is a reintroduced herd near Devils Canyon in the northern part of the range.

== Resource extraction ==
The arrival of the Burlington and Missouri Railroad to Sheridan in 1892 created a demand for railroad ties. This led several companies to launch commercial timber harvesting in the Bighorn Mountains, such as the McShane Tie Company. Workers built several timber camps in the mountains, including Woodrock and Rockwood, and the impressive Tongue River tie flume, featuring a wooden trestle that sent ties shooting down a waterslide at more than 50 miles per hour. Small sawmills operated at locations throughout the Bighorn Range, including the Babione sawmill on Babione Creek. Commercial timber harvesting continued into the 21st century, supplying lumber mills in Buffalo and Sheridan.

Reservoir companies in the early 1900s built extensive ditch and reservoir systems in the Bighorn Mountains to support agriculture and grain farming near Sheridan, Buffalo, and Greybull. Significant reservoirs include Willow Park, Bighorn, Park, Dome, and Shell. These reservoir companies continue to operate today, with shares of water dictating the operation of ditches and priority of water appropriation, which in the 21st century primarily supports alfalfa farming and municipal water systems.

Permitted livestock grazing on the Bighorn National Forest is known to degrade water quality with microbes like Escherichia coli and Giardia duodenalis. Sheridan's water treatment plant is built to handle this contamination.

== Recreation and human culture ==
The Bighorns are a popular destination for hiking, backpacking, fly fishing, hunting, horseback riding, and increasingly ATV riding and snowmobiling. Fishing opportunities abound in the Bighorns, with a high prevalence of brook trout. Camping is available at many established campgrounds with facilities, or across most of the national forest. Wilderness users must register at trailheads, but no permit is required, though there are regulations about group size, prohibiting fires at high elevation, and camping away from water sources.

Motorized trails wind through most of the national forest. The noise impacts from ATV use outside of the Cloud Peak Wilderness contrast from the former marketing motto that invited people to "Visit the Bighorns if you can stand the quiet." The Cloud Peak Wilderness has a network of hiking trails to remote areas and alpine lakes. Higher trails are often covered with snow except from July through August. After Labor Day, there is a good chance of high country snow storms at any time.

The Bighorns are home to one of the elite ultramarathons in the nation. The 100-mile (160 km) Bighorn Trail Run is held every June.

The Bighorns are home to two small ski areas: Meadowlark Resort off Highway 16 near Buffalo, and Antelope Butte Ski Area on U.S. 14 between Dayton and Greybull, which reopened in 2019 after a long hiatus. Antelope Butte hosts a summer festival with music, and foot and bike trail races.

The Bighorn National Forest permits land leases for hundreds of summer home cabins throughout the Bighorn Range. Regulations require the cabins to visually fit into the natural surroundings, and that cabin owners reduce fuels around the premises to reduce wildfire risk. The National Forest also permits summer grazing for cattle and sheep, and professional outfitting and hunting services.

Private inholdings and businesses within the Bighorn National Forest include Tepee Cabins, Folly Ranch, Dome Lake Club, Bighorn Reservoir Company, Kearny Reservoir, Paradise Ranch, Bear Lodge, Arrowhead Lodge, Elk View Inn, South Fork Lodge, Deer Haven Lodge, and Meadowlark Lodge, and Wyoming High Country Lodge. The former Spear O Wigwam guest ranch hosted Ernest Hemingway in 1928, where he wrote part of "A Farewell to Arms."

The Sioux, Crow, and Cheyenne peoples have long considered the Bighorns sacred mountains.

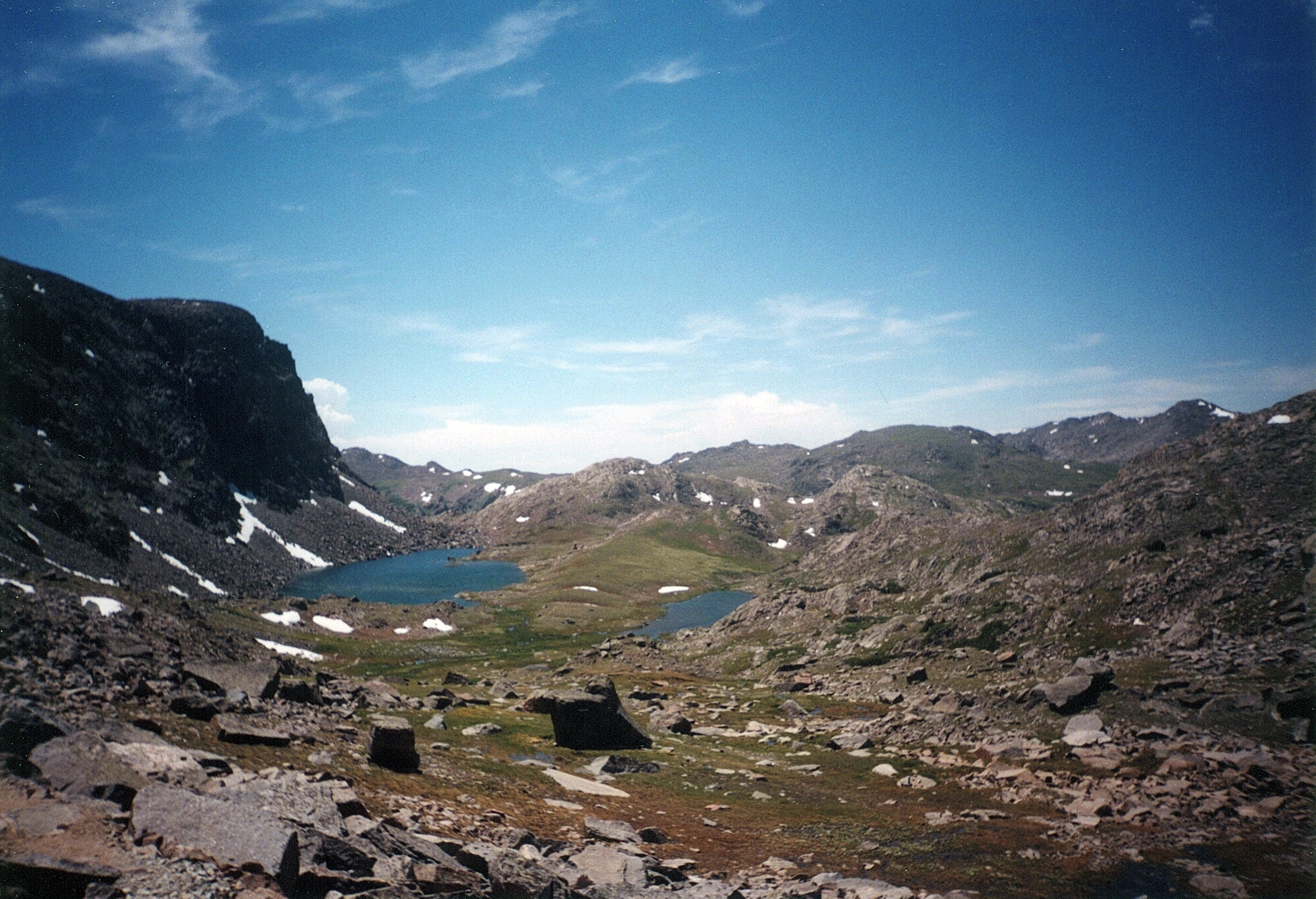
The Bighorns feature extensive alpine tundra

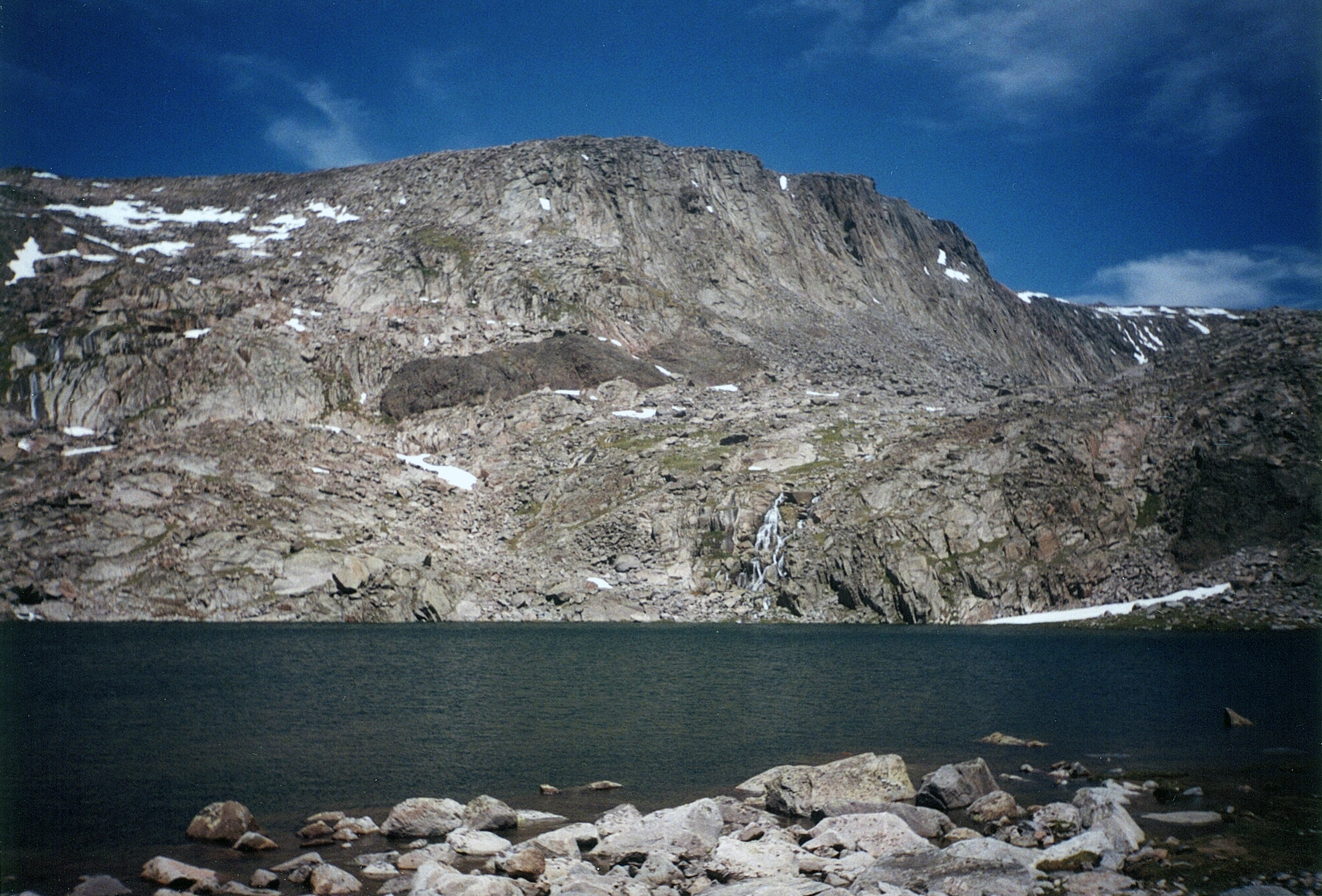
High lake in the Bighorns

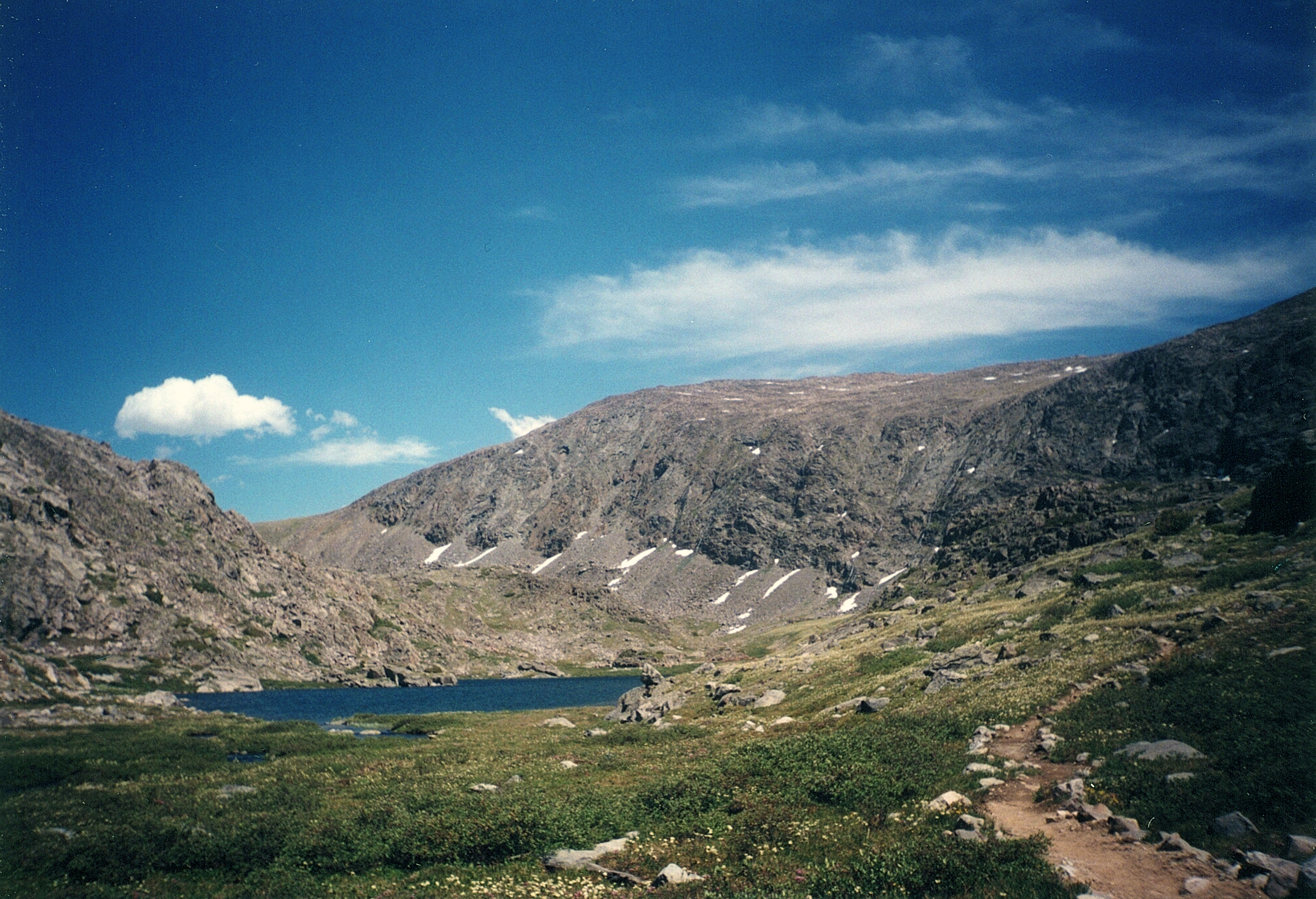
Above timberline in the Bighorns

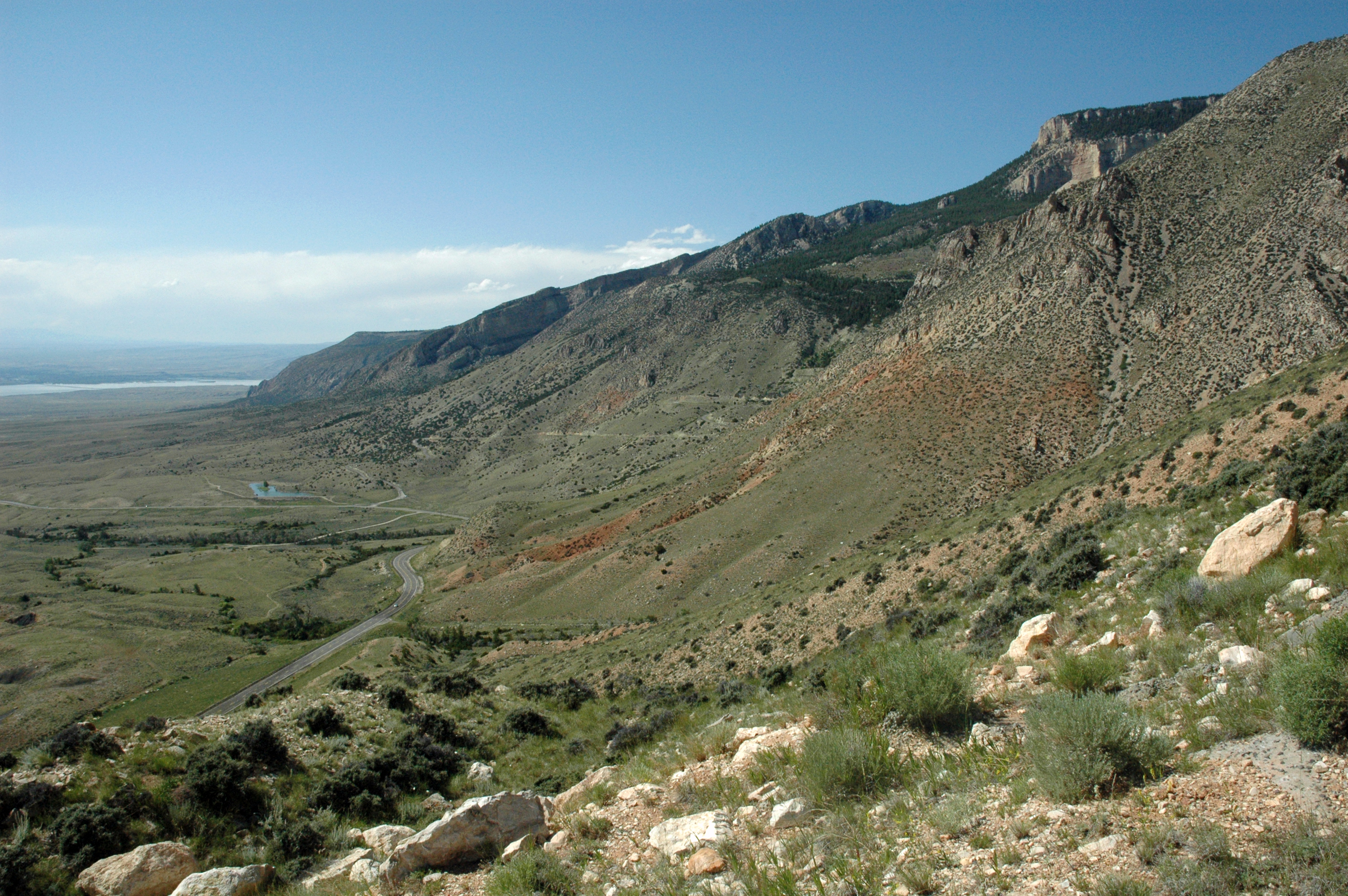
Western slope of the Bighorns

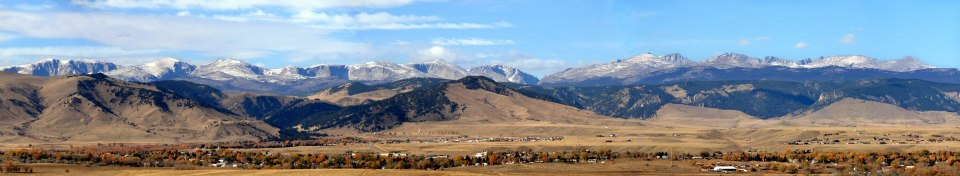
Eastern slope of the Bighorns above Buffalo, WY

== See also ==
- List of mountain ranges in Montana
- List of mountain ranges in Wyoming
