= Bighorn National Forest =

National forest in Wyoming, United States

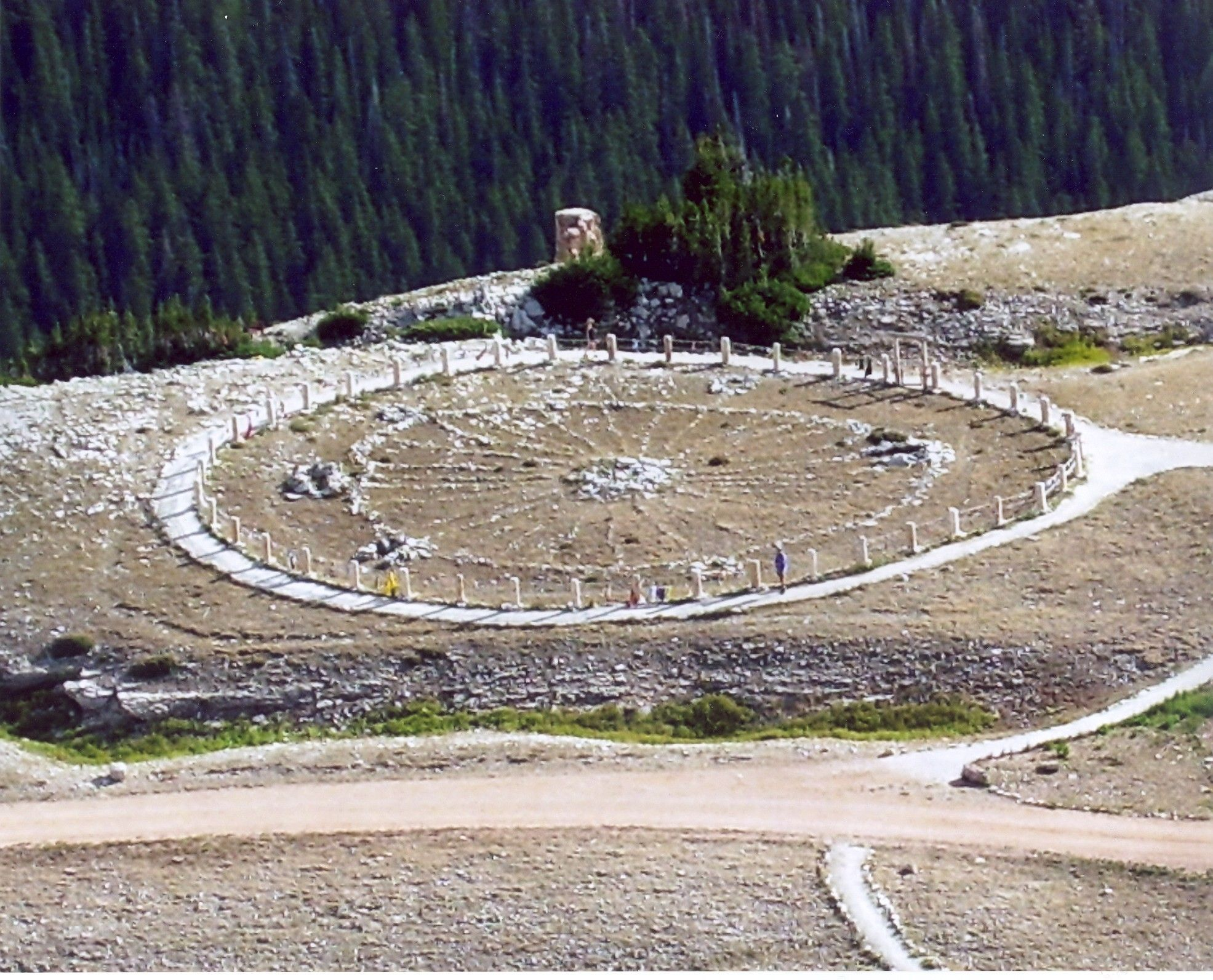
- The Medicine Wheel National Historic Landmark in the National Forest

- Location within the United States Location within Wyoming
- Interactive map of Bighorn National Forest
- Location: Sheridan, Big Horn, Johnson, and Washakie counties, Wyoming, United States
- Nearest city: Sheridan, WY
- Coordinates: 44°32′N 107°21′W
- Area: 1,107,571 acres (4,482.18 km^{2})
- Established: February 22, 1897
- Governing body: U.S. Forest Service
- Website: Bighorn National Forest

The Bighorn National Forest is a U.S. National Forest located in northern Wyoming, United States and consists of over 1.1 million acres (4,500 km^{2}). Created as a US Forest Reserve in 1897, it is one of the oldest government-protected forest lands in the U.S. The forest is well east of the continental divide and extends from the Montana border for a distance of 80 miles (130 km) along the spine of the Bighorn Mountains, an outlying mountain range separated from the rest of the Rocky Mountains by Bighorn Basin. Elevations range from 5,000 feet (1,500 m) along the sagebrush and grass-covered lowlands at the foot of the mountains, to 13,189 feet (4,020 m) on top of Cloud Peak, the highest point in the Bighorn Mountains. Around 99% of the land is above 1,500 metres (4,900 ft). The forest is named after the Bighorn River, which is partially fed by streams found in the forest. Streams in the range are fed primarily by snowmelt and snowmelt mixed with driving rainfall.

Within the forest is the Cloud Peak Wilderness area in which no motorized or mechanical equipment is allowed. The only access into the 189,000 acres (760 km^{2}) wilderness is on foot or horseback. There are 1,500 miles (2,400 km) of trails in the forest, along with 32 improved campgrounds, lodges, and three scenic vehicular byways. U.S. Route 14 in Wyoming, also known as the Bighorn Scenic Byway, crosses the middle of the 30-mile (48 km) wide forest. The Medicine Wheel Passage (U.S. Highway 14A) crosses in the north passing the Medicine Wheel National Historic Landmark, while the Cloud Peak Skyway (U.S. Route 16) crosses the highest pass in the forest (Powder River Pass 9,677 ft/2,950 m) and is located in the southern section of the forest.

The forest headquarters is located in Sheridan, Wyoming. In addition to the local ranger district office in Sheridan, there are also other ranger district offices in Buffalo and Greybull. Visitor centers are located at Burgess Junction and near Shell Falls. Burgess Junction, at the intersection of Route 14 and Route 14A about 25 miles from Dayton, also has a ranger station, visitor accommodation, and campgrounds.

== History ==
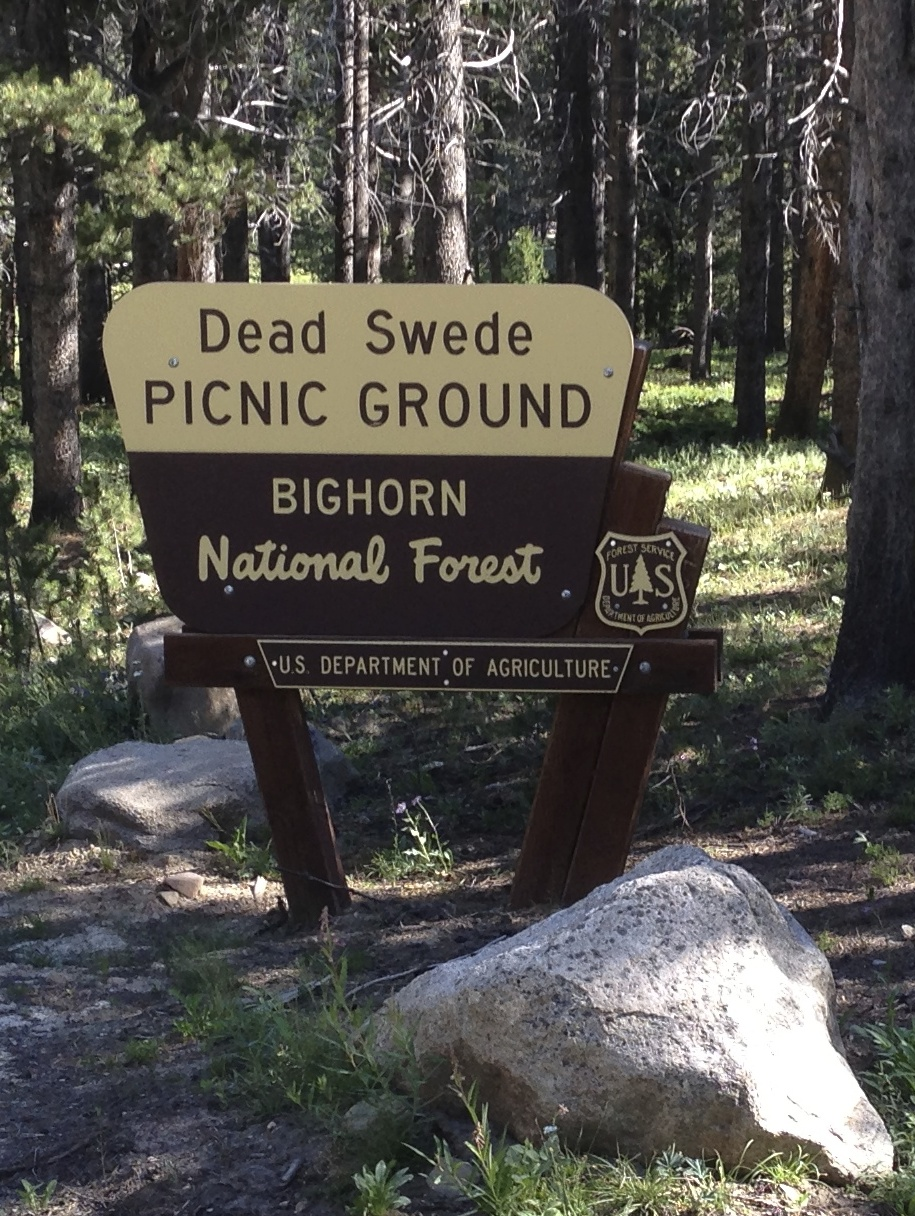
Picnic ground sign

The Bighorn National Forest was established as the Big Horn National Forest on 22 February 1897, and encompasses 1,198,080 acres. On 1 July 1908 the name was changed to the Bighorn National Forest through an executive order. In September 1981 the national forest had 1,115,171 acres, with 1,107,670 of those acres being National Forest land.

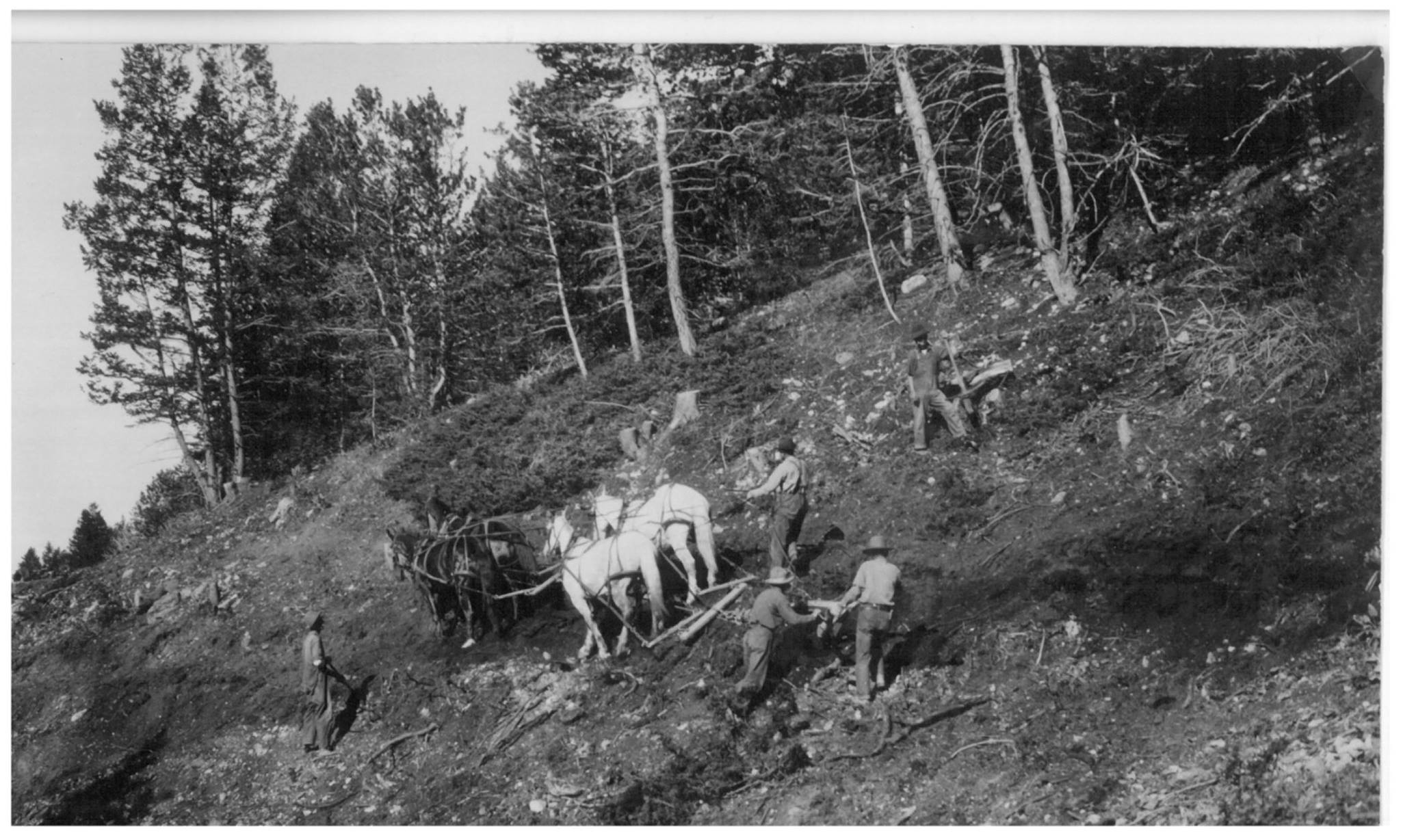
Men work on the Dayton-Kane road over the mountains in the 1920s

== Climate ==
According to the Köppen Climate Classification system, the Bighorn National Forest has a mostly subarctic climate, abbreviated "Dfc" on climate maps.

Climate data for Burgess Junction, Wyoming, 1991–2020 normals, extremes 1960–present
Month	Jan	Feb	Mar	Apr	May	Jun	Jul	Aug	Sep	Oct	Nov	Dec	Year
Record high °F (°C)	57 (14)	56 (13)	60 (16)	70 (21)	75 (24)	87 (31)	88 (31)	88 (31)	86 (30)	74 (23)	65 (18)	55 (13)	88 (31)
Mean maximum °F (°C)	46.7 (8.2)	45.7 (7.6)	50.0 (10.0)	57.8 (14.3)	67.2 (19.6)	74.8 (23.8)	81.1 (27.3)	79.8 (26.6)	75.8 (24.3)	65.5 (18.6)	53.2 (11.8)	46.1 (7.8)	82.0 (27.8)
Mean daily maximum °F (°C)	29.8 (−1.2)	29.4 (−1.4)	35.2 (1.8)	40.5 (4.7)	49.8 (9.9)	61.4 (16.3)	70.8 (21.6)	69.7 (20.9)	60.6 (15.9)	46.3 (7.9)	35.6 (2.0)	28.6 (−1.9)	46.5 (8.0)
Daily mean °F (°C)	18.9 (−7.3)	18.1 (−7.7)	23.8 (−4.6)	29.4 (−1.4)	38.9 (3.8)	48.4 (9.1)	56.4 (13.6)	55.4 (13.0)	46.9 (8.3)	34.6 (1.4)	25.2 (−3.8)	18.4 (−7.6)	34.5 (1.4)
Mean daily minimum °F (°C)	8.1 (−13.3)	6.7 (−14.1)	12.5 (−10.8)	18.3 (−7.6)	28.0 (−2.2)	35.4 (1.9)	41.9 (5.5)	41.0 (5.0)	33.2 (0.7)	22.9 (−5.1)	14.7 (−9.6)	8.1 (−13.3)	22.6 (−5.2)
Mean minimum °F (°C)	−15.2 (−26.2)	−16.5 (−26.9)	−8.2 (−22.3)	0.3 (−17.6)	12.7 (−10.7)	25.5 (−3.6)	32.3 (0.2)	30.7 (−0.7)	19.0 (−7.2)	1.3 (−17.1)	−9.4 (−23.0)	−16.3 (−26.8)	−25.5 (−31.9)
Record low °F (°C)	−44 (−42)	−45 (−43)	−24 (−31)	−18 (−28)	0 (−18)	5 (−15)	21 (−6)	20 (−7)	−5 (−21)	−22 (−30)	−28 (−33)	−48 (−44)	−48 (−44)
Average precipitation inches (mm)	1.42 (36)	1.67 (42)	2.08 (53)	2.79 (71)	3.50 (89)	2.41 (61)	1.57 (40)	1.20 (30)	2.02 (51)	2.30 (58)	1.62 (41)	1.54 (39)	24.12 (611)
Average snowfall inches (cm)	31.7 (81)	32.6 (83)	35.3 (90)	36.8 (93)	19.3 (49)	3.3 (8.4)	0.0 (0.0)	0.1 (0.25)	6.3 (16)	24.3 (62)	27.7 (70)	31.9 (81)	249.3 (633.65)
Average extreme snow depth inches (cm)	31.3 (80)	34.9 (89)	40.5 (103)	38.7 (98)	17.5 (44)	2.0 (5.1)	0.0 (0.0)	0.1 (0.25)	4.3 (11)	11.9 (30)	17.6 (45)	25.6 (65)	49.0 (124)
Average precipitation days (≥ 0.01 in)	10.1	9.3	10.4	12.0	9.3	6.3	4.9	7.2	4.7	8.7	8.8	9.9	101.6
Average snowy days (≥ 0.1 in)	10.1	9.2	9.8	10.4	5.5	0.9	0.0	0.0	1.8	6.5	8.8	9.7	72.7
Source 1: NOAA
Source 2: National Weather Service

Bald Mountain is a small peak on the northern plateau of the Bighorn Mountains.

Climate data for Bald Mountain, Wyoming, 1991–2020 normals: 9380ft (2859m)
Month	Jan	Feb	Mar	Apr	May	Jun	Jul	Aug	Sep	Oct	Nov	Dec	Year
Mean daily maximum °F (°C)	22.8 (−5.1)	24.3 (−4.3)	33.4 (0.8)	40.2 (4.6)	49.0 (9.4)	56.9 (13.8)	66.0 (18.9)	64.6 (18.1)	54.3 (12.4)	39.8 (4.3)	28.7 (−1.8)	21.6 (−5.8)	41.8 (5.4)
Daily mean °F (°C)	16.4 (−8.7)	16.7 (−8.5)	24.1 (−4.4)	30.0 (−1.1)	39.1 (3.9)	47.0 (8.3)	55.4 (13.0)	54.2 (12.3)	45.2 (7.3)	32.4 (0.2)	22.2 (−5.4)	15.5 (−9.2)	33.2 (0.6)
Mean daily minimum °F (°C)	9.9 (−12.3)	9.1 (−12.7)	14.8 (−9.6)	19.8 (−6.8)	29.1 (−1.6)	37.1 (2.8)	44.8 (7.1)	43.8 (6.6)	36.2 (2.3)	24.9 (−3.9)	15.7 (−9.1)	9.4 (−12.6)	24.5 (−4.1)
Average precipitation inches (mm)	2.64 (67)	2.51 (64)	2.81 (71)	3.50 (89)	3.81 (97)	3.44 (87)	1.34 (34)	1.13 (29)	2.20 (56)	2.82 (72)	2.37 (60)	2.34 (59)	30.91 (785)
Source 1: XMACIS2
Source 2: NOAA (Precipitation)

The SNOTEL weather station, Bone Springs, is slightly north of Cedar Mountain.

Climate data for Bone Springs Div, Wyoming, 1991–2020 normals: 9350ft (2850m)
Month	Jan	Feb	Mar	Apr	May	Jun	Jul	Aug	Sep	Oct	Nov	Dec	Year
Mean daily maximum °F (°C)	24.3 (−4.3)	25.8 (−3.4)	33.6 (0.9)	39.3 (4.1)	48.1 (8.9)	56.7 (13.7)	65.5 (18.6)	63.9 (17.7)	54.0 (12.2)	40.8 (4.9)	30.1 (−1.1)	23.1 (−4.9)	42.1 (5.6)
Daily mean °F (°C)	16.7 (−8.5)	17.0 (−8.3)	23.8 (−4.6)	29.2 (−1.6)	38.3 (3.5)	46.6 (8.1)	54.7 (12.6)	53.4 (11.9)	44.7 (7.1)	32.5 (0.3)	22.5 (−5.3)	15.8 (−9.0)	32.9 (0.5)
Mean daily minimum °F (°C)	9.1 (−12.7)	8.2 (−13.2)	14.0 (−10.0)	19.2 (−7.1)	28.5 (−1.9)	36.6 (2.6)	43.8 (6.6)	42.9 (6.1)	35.3 (1.8)	24.2 (−4.3)	14.9 (−9.5)	8.6 (−13.0)	23.8 (−4.5)
Average precipitation inches (mm)	2.24 (57)	2.25 (57)	2.79 (71)	3.47 (88)	3.92 (100)	2.84 (72)	1.59 (40)	1.32 (34)	2.50 (64)	2.81 (71)	2.07 (53)	2.12 (54)	29.92 (761)
Source 1: XMACIS2
Source 2: NOAA (Precipitation)

== Ecology and recreation ==
Conifer forest in a valley of the Bighorn National Forest, Wyoming, 2026

The Bighorn National Forest contains primarily forest along with alpine meadows and lakes at higher elevations. The forest is primarily lodgepole pine, along with several species of spruce, fir, and aspen. While grizzly bears have not inhabited the forest since the early 20th century, black bears are widespread. Grizzly bears have made a comeback in the decades. Other large mammals include cougars, elk, mule deer, pronghorn, and moose. Coyotes are also present in this forest. Numerous lakes are found within the forest and most are naturally stocked with trout and at least 100 other fish species. Meadow Lark Lake is a popular recreation area created by the construction of a dam built by Company 841 of the Civilian Conservation Corps in 1936. Water quality sampling from the lakes shows the highest acid rain deposition of any mountain chain in the Rockies.

== Gallery ==
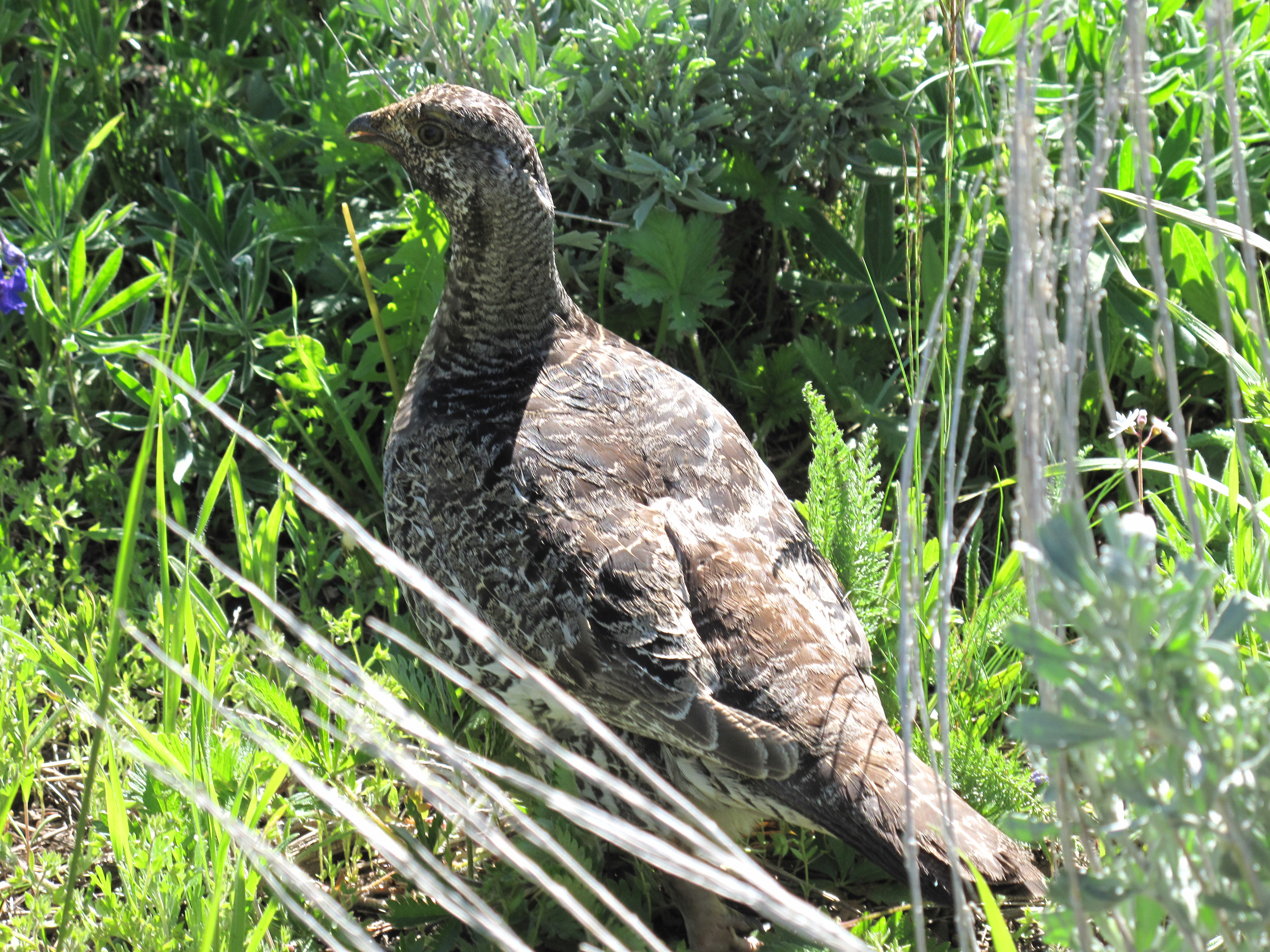
Sage Grouse in Bighorn National Forest

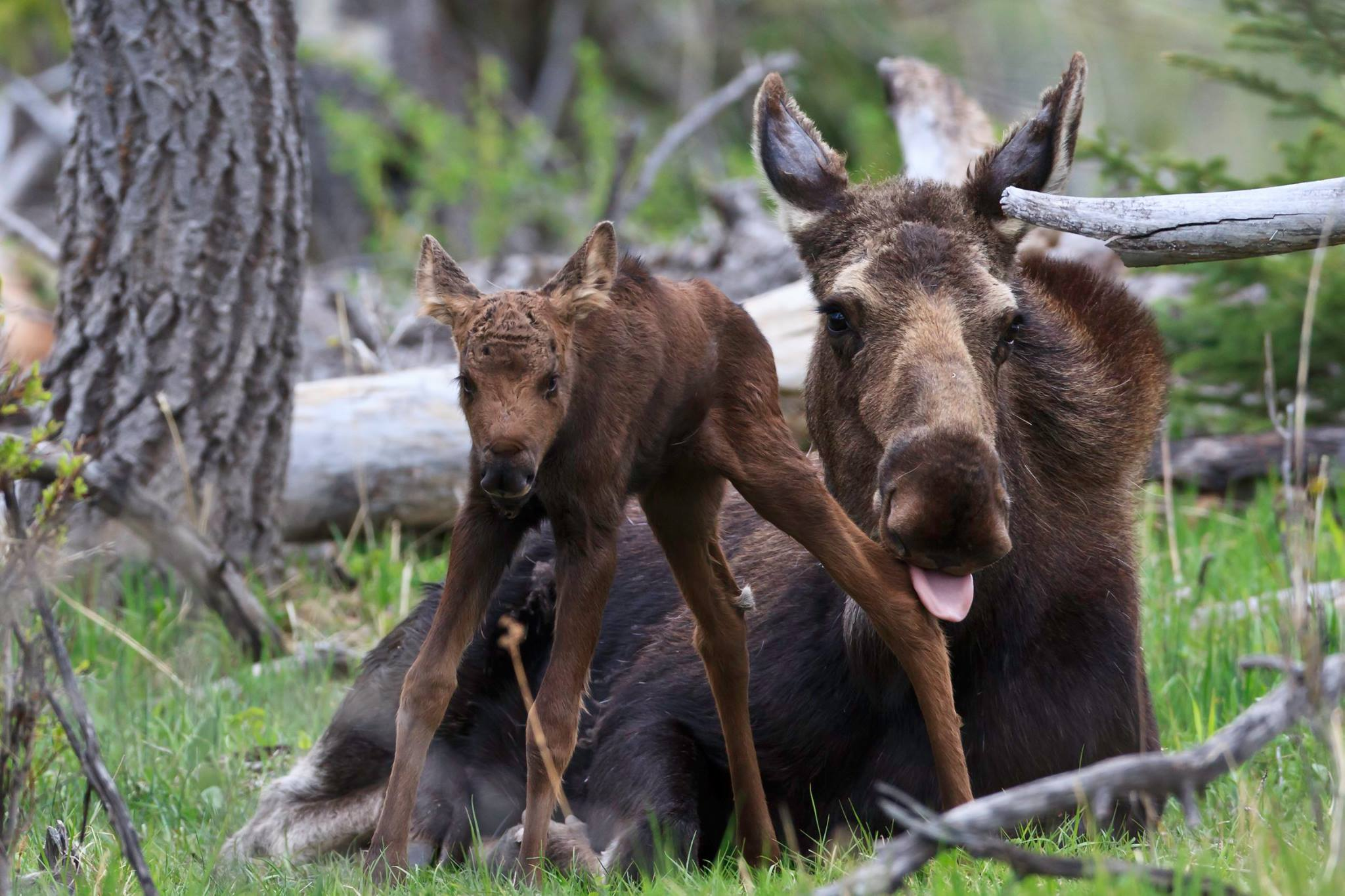
A moose cow and her calf near the Shell Ranger Station

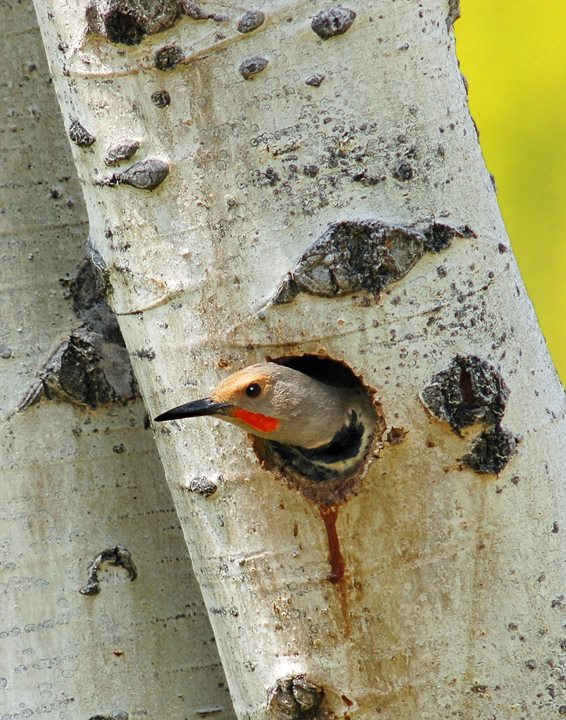
A northern flicker in a tree

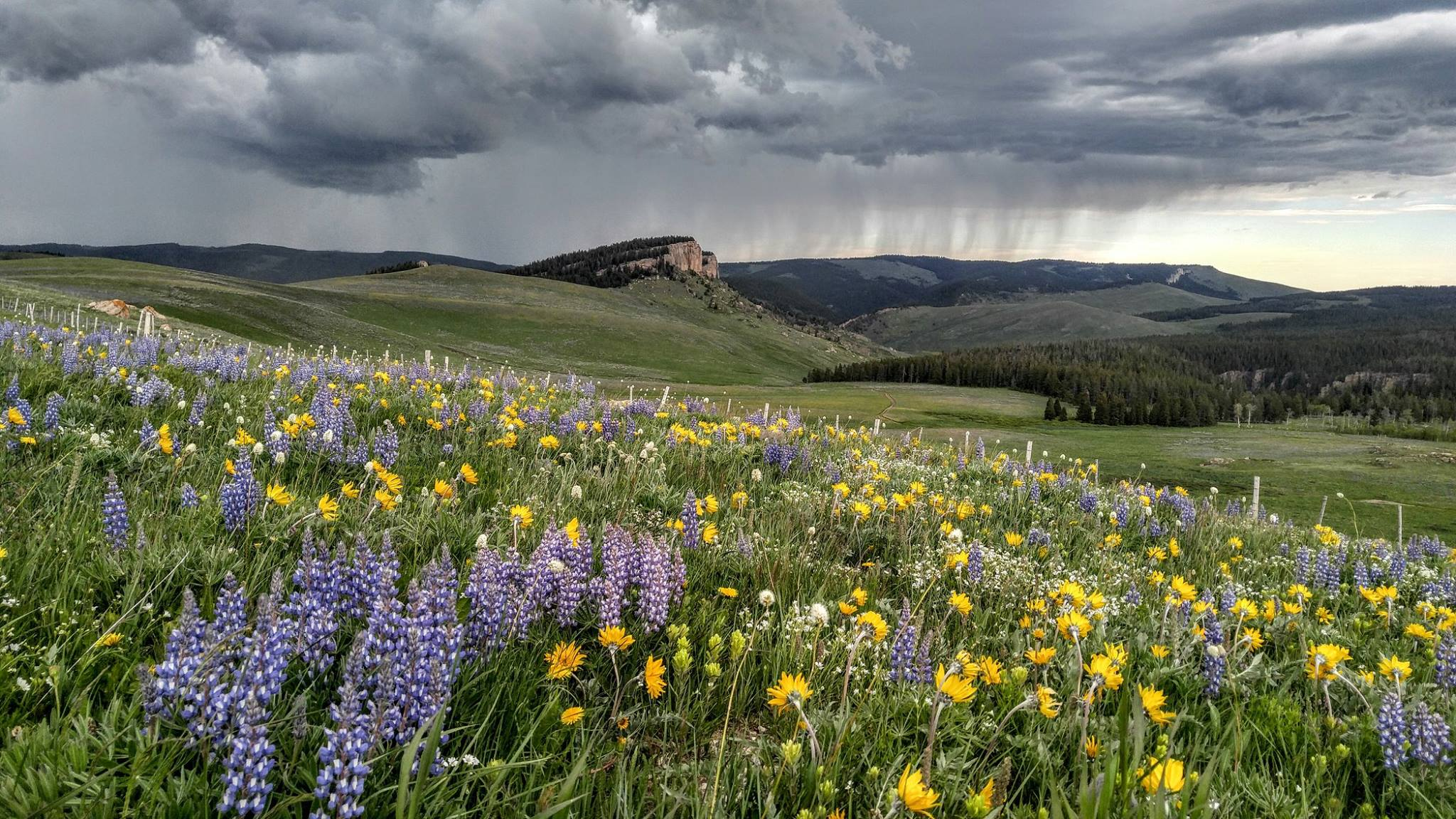
Wildflowers blooming in the short high altitude summer

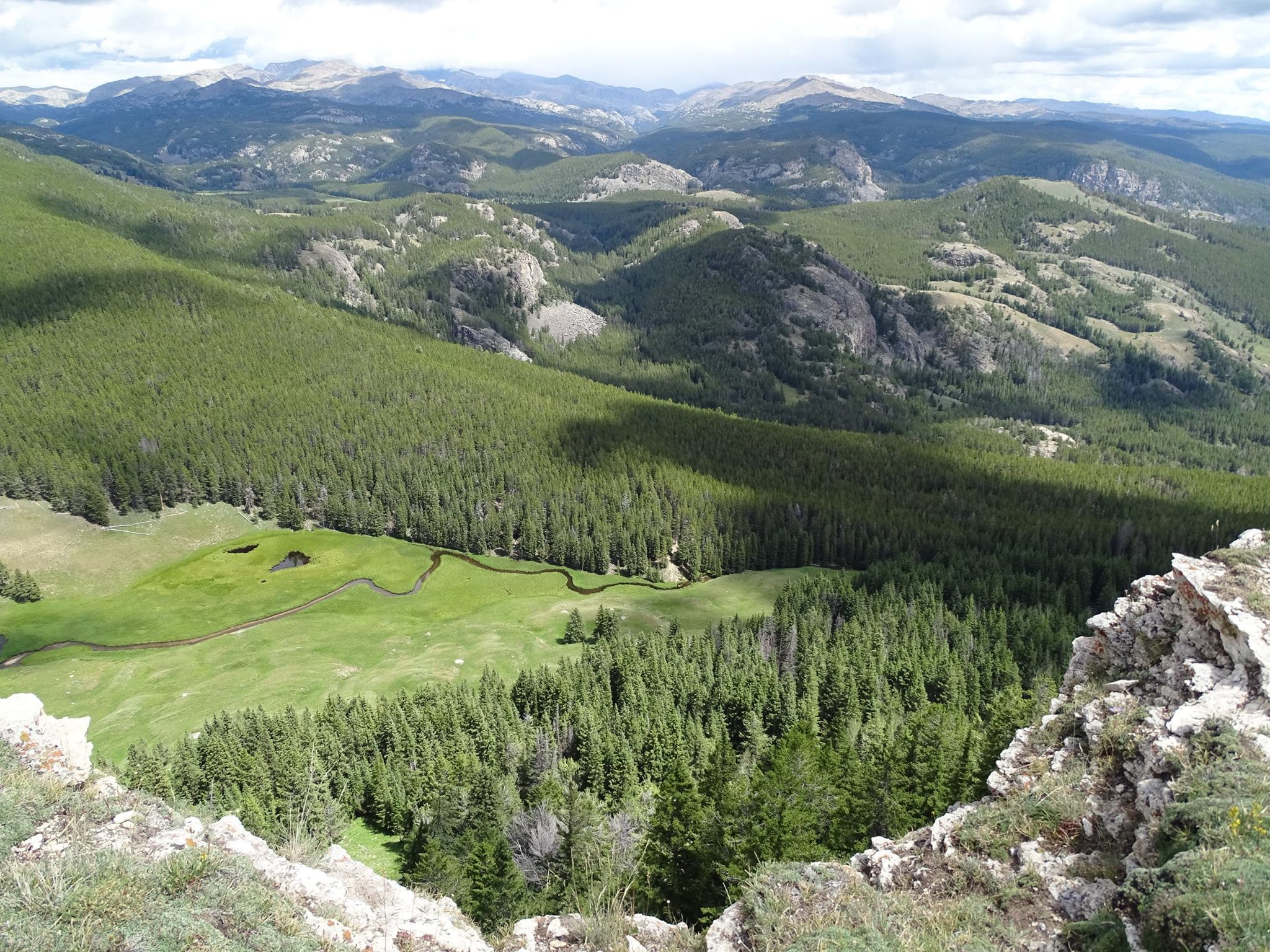

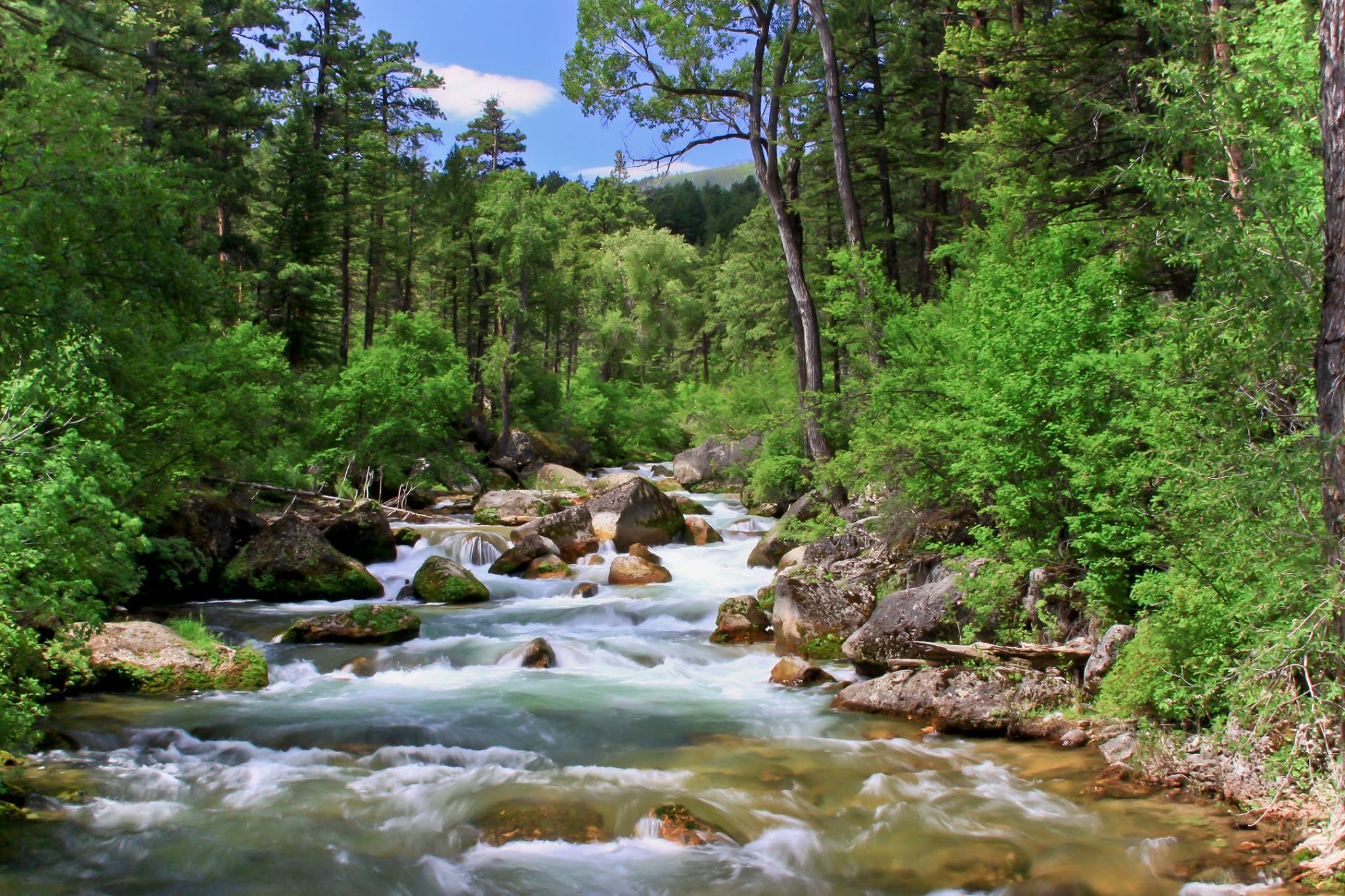

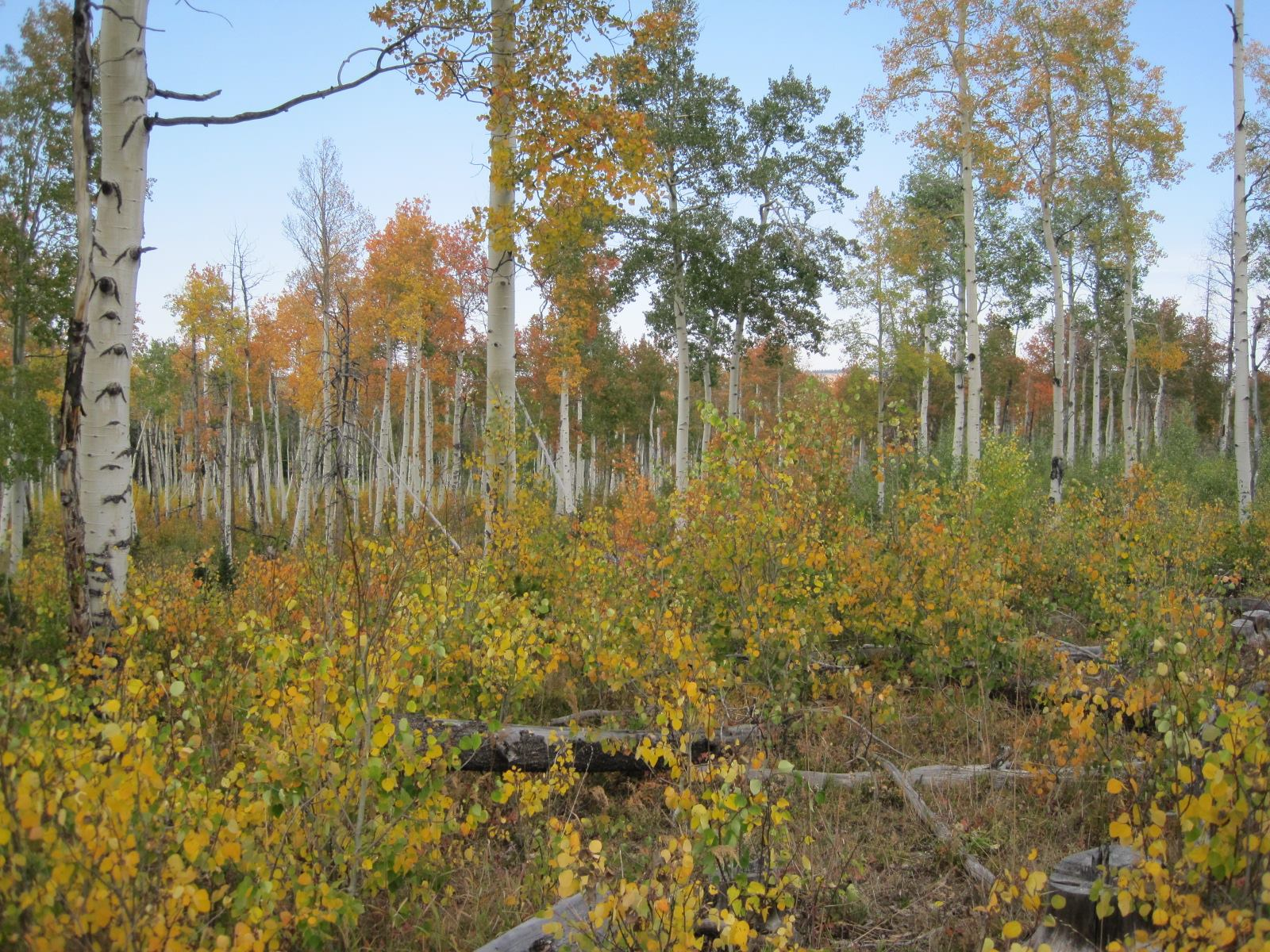

== See also ==
- List of national forests of the United States
