= Pasang Kikuli =

Nepalese mountain climber and explorer

- Pasang Kikuli in 1936

Personal information
- Nationality: Nepalese
- Born: 1911 Sola Khumbu, Nepal
- Died: about 31 July 1939 (aged 28) K2, Karakoram, British Raj

Pasang Kikuli (1911–1939) was a Nepalese Sherpa mountain climber and explorer who acted as a sirdar for many Himalayan expeditions. He died on the 1939 American Karakoram expedition to K2, attempting to rescue a stranded climber.

== Biography ==
Pasang Kikuli was one of the first generation of Sherpas to be included on the European Himalayan mountaineering expeditions. He was born Sola Khombu, Nepal in 1911 and, starting from when he was only 18 years old, he went on all three expeditions to Kangchenjunga in 1929, in 1930, and in 1931. He died in 1939 at the age of 28 leaving a widow and two young children.

== Climbing career ==
He was on the 1933 British Mount Everest expedition where he reached Camp V. Hugh Ruttledge, who led the expedition, said he was one of the best porters. On the 1934 Nanga Parbat expedition he was one of the very few who came down from Camp VIII alive. He had stayed with his sahib, Uli Wieland until he died and then he came down with other Sherpas to Camp IV by then suffering from dreadful frostbite.

In 1935 his frostbite ruled out any mountaineering but in 1936 he was selected by Bill Tilman for the British–American Himalayan Expedition to Nanda Devi. Because of his frostbite he was not able to go very high but Art Emmons, one of the American climbers, said he was "by far the best porter, a fine personal servant, energetic, and hardworking." After Tilman and Noel Odell had reached the summit (at the time at 25,643 feet (7,816 m) it was the highest summit ever to have been climbed), he was the only Sherpa to accompany Tilman and Charlie Houston over Longstaff's Col out of the Nanda Devi Sanctuary, the first crossing of the col.

In 1937 he was part of Spencer Chapman's expedition to Chomolhari. Chapman had envisaged that Kikuli would be part of the summit team, with Nima Tondrup and Pasang Dawa Lama in support. Crawford, the other European member of the team, had to retreat as he due back in Calcutta and had been ill in the night, Kikuli had also been unwell so they both descended along with Tondrup who was the oldest of the 3 Sherpas. Spencer Chapman and Pasang Dawa Lama reached the summit the following day and then endured a protracted and epic descent.

== 1938 and 1939 in the Karakoram and on K2 ==
On the 1938 American Karakoram expedition Pasang Kikuli acted as sirdar (chief Sherpa). Norman Streatfeild, the transport officer wrote, "A really excellent porter in every way. Good on rock and ice and always safe on a rope. Acted as Sirdar and carried out his duties admirably."

Next year on the 1939 American K2 expedition, Dudley Wolfe was high on K2 at Camp VII at 24,700 feet (7,500 m) on 28 July when all the other American climbers were at Base Camp at 16,500 feet (5,000 m). Two Sherpas were at Camp IV after an abandoned rescue with instructions to reach Wolfe if they could. The leader of the expedition, Fritz Wiessner, asked two Sherpas at Base Camp to make another rescue attempt. Tsering Norbu, with Pasang Kikuli as leader, left Base Camp at 06:00, made it to Camp IV by noon, and met the other Sherpas by the end of the day at Camp VI. By climbing 7,000 feet (2,100 m) in one day they made the sort of alpine-style Himalayan ascent only achieved decades later by western climbers. With Tsering Norbu staying at Camp VI, Pasang Kikuli, Pasang Kitar and Phinsoo reached Wolfe at noon, 29 July.

Wolfe had spent 38 days continuously above 22,000 feet (6,700 m) and 16 days averaging 25,000 feet (7,600 m) without supplementary oxygen – he was alive but in a terrible condition: no water or warm food, utterly apathetic and, because he was trapped in his tent, covered in urine and feces. He refused to go down, telling the Sherpas to return next day when he would be ready. Back at Camp VI the Sherpas were stormbound but on 31 July the three again attempted his rescue. Pasang Kikuli, Pasang Kitar, Phinsoo and Wolfe were never seen alive again. Wiessner wrote afterwards, "The death of Pasang Kikuli takes away one of the finest men and best climbers from the climbing fraternity."

In 1935 he was awarded the German Red Cross Medal for the part he played during the 1934 Nanga Parbat climbing disaster. Kikuli was awarded a Tiger Badge by the Himalayan Club in 1939, his 'Himalayan Club Number' was 8.
