= 1953 American Karakoram expedition =

Attempt at first ascent of K2 in 1953

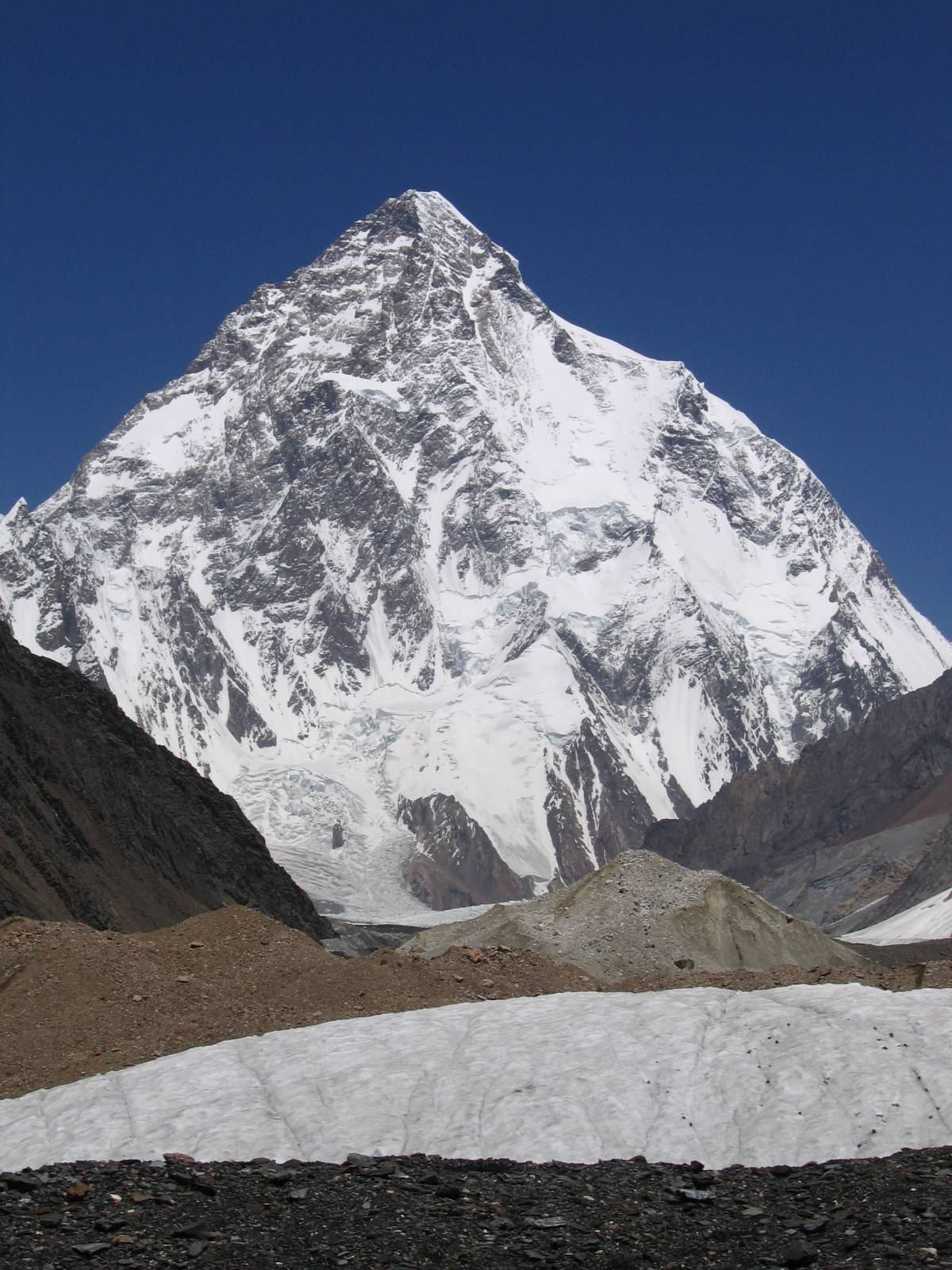
K2 from the south. The Abruzzi Spur attempted by the expedition is the last spur before the right hand skyline. The highest point reached is the flattened part of the skyline at two-thirds height

The 1953 American Karakoram expedition was a mountaineering expedition to K2, at 8,611 metres the second highest mountain on Earth. It was the fifth expedition to attempt K2, and the first since the Second World War. Led by Charles Houston, a mainly American team attempted the mountain's South-East Spur (commonly known as the Abruzzi Spur) in a style which was unusually lightweight for the time. The team reached a high point of 7750 m, but were trapped by a storm in their high camp, where a team member, Art Gilkey, became seriously ill. A desperate retreat down the mountain followed, during which all but one of the climbers were nearly killed in a fall arrested by Pete Schoening, and Gilkey later died in an apparent avalanche. The expedition has been widely praised for the courage shown by the climbers in their attempt to save Gilkey, and for the team spirit and the bonds of friendship it fostered.

== Background ==
By 1953, four expeditions had attempted to climb K2. Oscar Eckenstein and Luigi Amedeo, Duke of the Abruzzi had led expeditions in 1902 and 1909 respectively, neither of which had made substantial progress, and the Duke of the Abruzzi had declared after his attempt that the mountain would never be climbed. However, two American expeditions in 1938 and 1939 had come closer to success. Charles Houston's 1938 expedition had established the feasibility of the Abruzzi Spur as a route to the summit, reaching the Shoulder at 8000 m, before retreating due to diminishing supplies and the threat of bad weather. Fritz Wiessner's attempt on the 1939 American Karakoram expedition went even higher but ended in disaster when four men disappeared high on the mountain. In spite of the tragedy, the expeditions had shown that climbing K2 was a realistic goal, and further attempts would almost certainly have been made sooner had the Second World War and the Indo-Pakistani War of 1947 not made travel to Kashmir impossible during the 1940s.

== Expedition planning ==
In spite of the political difficulties they faced, Charles Houston and Robert Bates had harboured hopes of returning to K2 since their initial attempt in 1938, and in 1952 Houston, with the aid of his friend Avra M. Warren, the U.S. Ambassador to Pakistan, obtained permission for an expedition the following year.

Houston and Bates planned the expedition as a lightweight one, incorporating many elements of what would later become known as the Alpine style. There were practical reasons for this as well as stylistic ones. Since partition, the Indian Sherpas who had traditionally served as porters on Himalayan expeditions were unwelcome in Pakistan, and few of the Hunza porters who would replace them had genuine mountaineering skills. Given the technical difficulty of the Abruzzi Spur it was therefore impractical to use porters to carry loads high on the mountain, so it was planned to use them only as far as Camp II. Additionally the steepness of the Abruzzi Spur meant there was limited flat space for tents, and camp sites to accommodate large numbers of climbers would be difficult to find. Houston and Bates therefore planned to assemble a small team of eight climbers and no high-altitude porters. The size of the team ruled out the use of supplemental oxygen as there would not be enough manpower to carry the extra weight up the mountain, but Houston was confident from his own wartime experiments, as well as the experience of the pre-war British Everest expeditions, that it would be possible to climb K2 without it.

Houston and Bates considered many climbers, and selected them for their compatibility as a team and all-round experience rather than individual brilliance. Houston was aware that personality clashes between team members had been detrimental to other Karakoram expeditions, most notably Wiessner's, who as expedition leader laid full blame for the incident on a junior climber rather than take any personal responsibility, and was keen to avoid them. The six climbers selected were Robert Craig, a ski instructor from Seattle; Art Gilkey, a geologist from Iowa; Dee Molenaar, a geologist and artist from Seattle; Pete Schoening, also from Seattle and at 25 the youngest of the party; and George Bell, a nuclear scientist from Los Alamos. The eighth member of the team was Tony Streather, an English army officer who was initially appointed Transport Officer, but showed sufficient prowess to become a full member of the climbing team. The biggest disappointment was that William House, who had played a major role in the 1938 expedition, was unable to return for business reasons. Other talented climbers, such as Willi Unsoeld, Paul Petzoldt and Fritz Wiessner himself were controversially not included because it was not felt that they would get on with the rest of the team.

The expedition was privately funded, receiving no grants from either the government or American mountaineering bodies. The budget of $32,000 came from the team members themselves, some gifts, advances paid by the National Broadcasting Company and the Saturday Evening Post for a film and a series of newspaper articles, as well as significant loans. Some corporate sponsorship was also obtained, but mainly in the form of equipment and food rather than money.

== Climbing, storm and illness ==
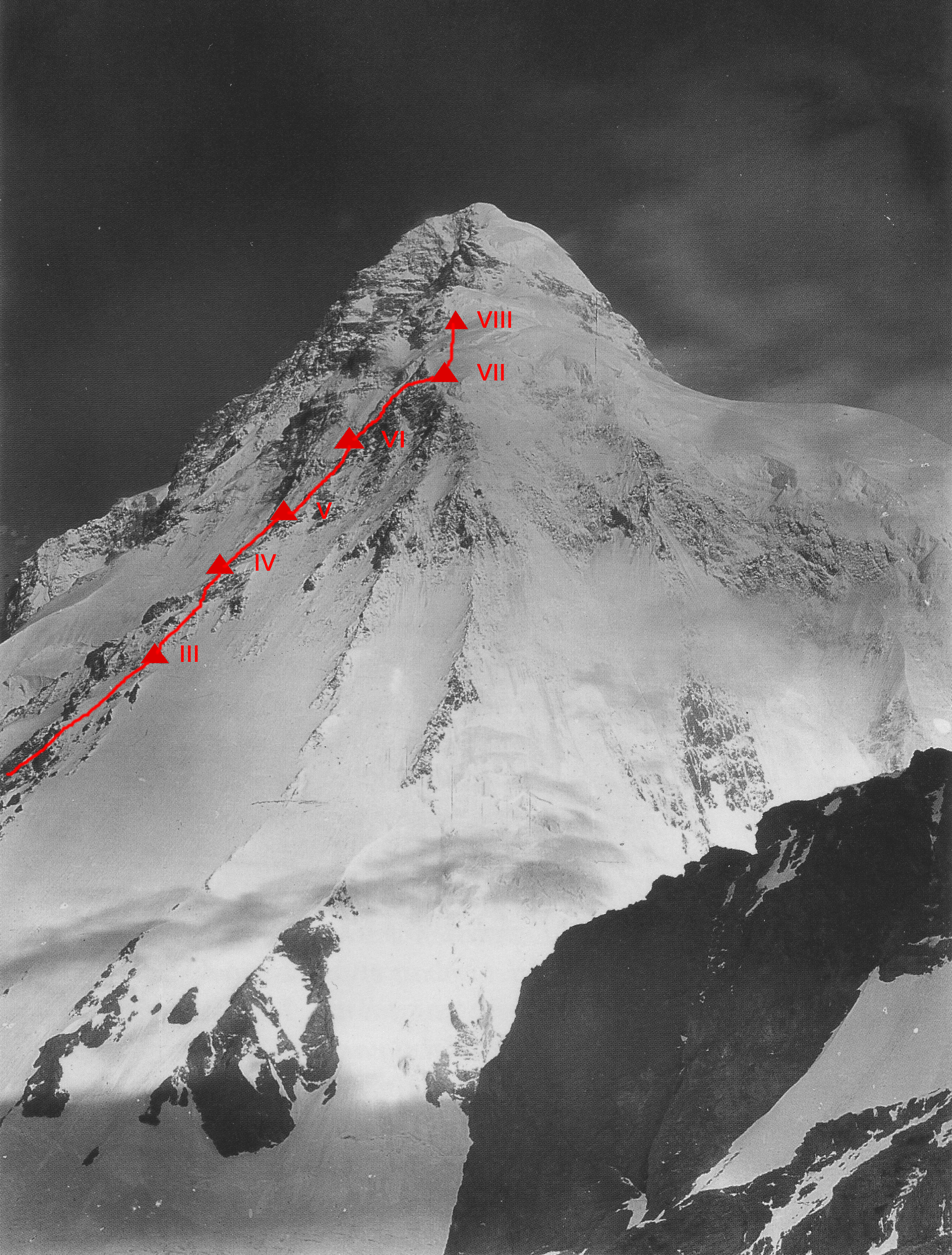
The route taken by the expedition on the upper section of the Abruzzi Spur, showing the positions of Camps III-VIII. The near fatal accident occurred between Camps VII and VIII. Click to enlarge.

The expedition assembled in Rawalpindi at the end of May, flew on to Skardu, and after the long trek through Askole and up the Baltoro Glacier, arrived at the base of K2 on 20 June. The early stages of the climb proceeded smoothly, though progress was slow due to the expedition's tactics. The tragedies on Nanga Parbat in 1934 and K2 in 1939 had convinced Houston of the importance of keeping all camps well stocked at all times in case the expedition had to retreat in bad weather. Doing this required the climbers to make extra journeys up and down the mountain carrying extra supplies, which would prove crucial to their survival.

By 1 August the route had been pushed as far as Camp VIII, at the base of the Shoulder at around 7800 m, and the next day the whole team assembled there to prepare for the final push for the summit. However, the weather had been gradually deteriorating for several days, and soon a severe storm broke. At first it did not dispirit the team, and a secret ballot was held to decide which climbers should make the first summit attempt. However, as the storm continued for day after day their position became more serious. One of the tents collapsed on the fourth night, forcing Houston and Bell to crowd into other, already cramped tents. On 6 August, with weather forecasts offering little hope of improvement, the party for the first time discussed retreating.

The next day the weather improved, but thoughts of attempting the summit were quickly abandoned when Art Gilkey collapsed just outside his tent. Houston diagnosed him as suffering from thrombophlebitis—blood clots which would be dangerous at sea level, but would almost certainly be fatal at 7800 m. The whole team was now forced into a desperate attempt to save him. While they believed that there was little or no chance of saving him, the possibility of abandoning him was never discussed. However, the unacceptable avalanche risk followed by a renewal of the storm prevented a descent at that time, and the team remained at Camp VIII for several more days in the hope that the weather would improve.

== Attempted rescue and fall ==
By 10 August the situation had become critical: Gilkey was showing signs of pulmonary embolism and deteriorating quickly, and the whole team was still trapped at an altitude that would have eventually killed them all. In spite of the continuing storm and avalanche risk, the team immediately began descending. On a makeshift stretcher made from canvas, ropes and a sleeping bag, Gilkey was pulled or lowered down steep terrain, until the team reached a point where they could traverse a difficult ice slope to their Camp VII, at around 7,500 metres (24,600 ft).

A mass fall occurred as the climbers began the traverse. George Bell slipped and fell on a patch of hard ice, pulling off his rope-mate Tony Streather. As they fell, their rope became entangled with those connecting Houston, Bates, Gilkey and Molenaar, pulling all these climbers off as well. Finally the strain came onto Pete Schoening, who had been belaying Gilkey and Molenaar. Quickly wrapping the rope around his shoulders and ice axe, Schoening held all six climbers, preventing them from falling into the Godwin-Austen Glacier. This act became simply known as "The Belay."

After the climbers had recovered and made their way to the tent at Camp VII, Gilkey was lost. He had been anchored to the ice slope as the exhausted climbers prepared the tent, and his muffled shouts were heard. When Bates and Streather returned to bring him to the tent, they found no sign of him. A faint groove in the snow suggested that an avalanche had taken place. Authors such as Jim Curran have suggested that Gilkey's death, while tragic, undoubtedly saved the lives of the rest of the team, who were now free to concentrate on their own survival. Houston has agreed with this assessment, but Pete Schoening always believed, based on his other experiences of mountain rescue, that the team could have successfully completed the rescue, albeit with more frostbite than they eventually suffered. There is also controversy over the manner of Gilkey's death. Tom Hornbein and others have suggested that, realising his rescue was endangering the lives of the others, Gilkey might have untied himself from the mountainside. Charles Houston initially believed that Gilkey, sedated with morphine, did not have the physical strength to untie the anchors. However, when recounting the events for a documentary in 2003, he changed his mind and concluded that Gilkey had indeed untethered himself. Other people, such as Robert Bates, remained convinced that an avalanche swept Gilkey away.

The descent from Camp VII to Base Camp took a further five days and was itself gruelling; all the climbers were exhausted, George Bell had badly frostbitten feet and Charles Houston, who had suffered a head injury, was dazed and concussed. Houston has said that, while he is proud of the team's attempt to rescue Gilkey, he feels the successful descent was a greater achievement. During the descent, the climbers saw a broken ice-axe and some bloodstained rocks, but no other trace of Art Gilkey was found.

On the team's descent to Base Camp, a memorial cairn was erected to Art Gilkey, and a service was held. The Gilkey Memorial has since become the burial place of other climbers who have died on K2, as well as a memorial to those whose bodies have not been found.

Clothing and human remains, positively identified as Gilkey, were discovered close to K2 Base Camp in 1993 by an expedition led by British mountaineer Roger Payne.

== Aftermath and legacy ==
In spite of the trauma of the expedition, Charles Houston was keen to make another attempt on K2, and requested permission for a further expedition in 1954. He was extremely disappointed that a large Italian expedition had booked the mountain that year. The Italian expedition was successful, and while Houston had permission for 1955 he did not take it up, and gave up mountaineering in order to concentrate on his career researching high-altitude medicine. Pete Schoening, however, returned to the Karakoram in 1958 and, with Andy Kauffman made the first ascent of Gasherbrum I; at 8080 m the highest first ascent ever made by an American team.

The account of the expedition, written by Bates and Houston with additional sections by the other climbers, was published in 1954 as K2 - The Savage Mountain. It received widespread acclaim, and is regarded as a mountaineering classic.

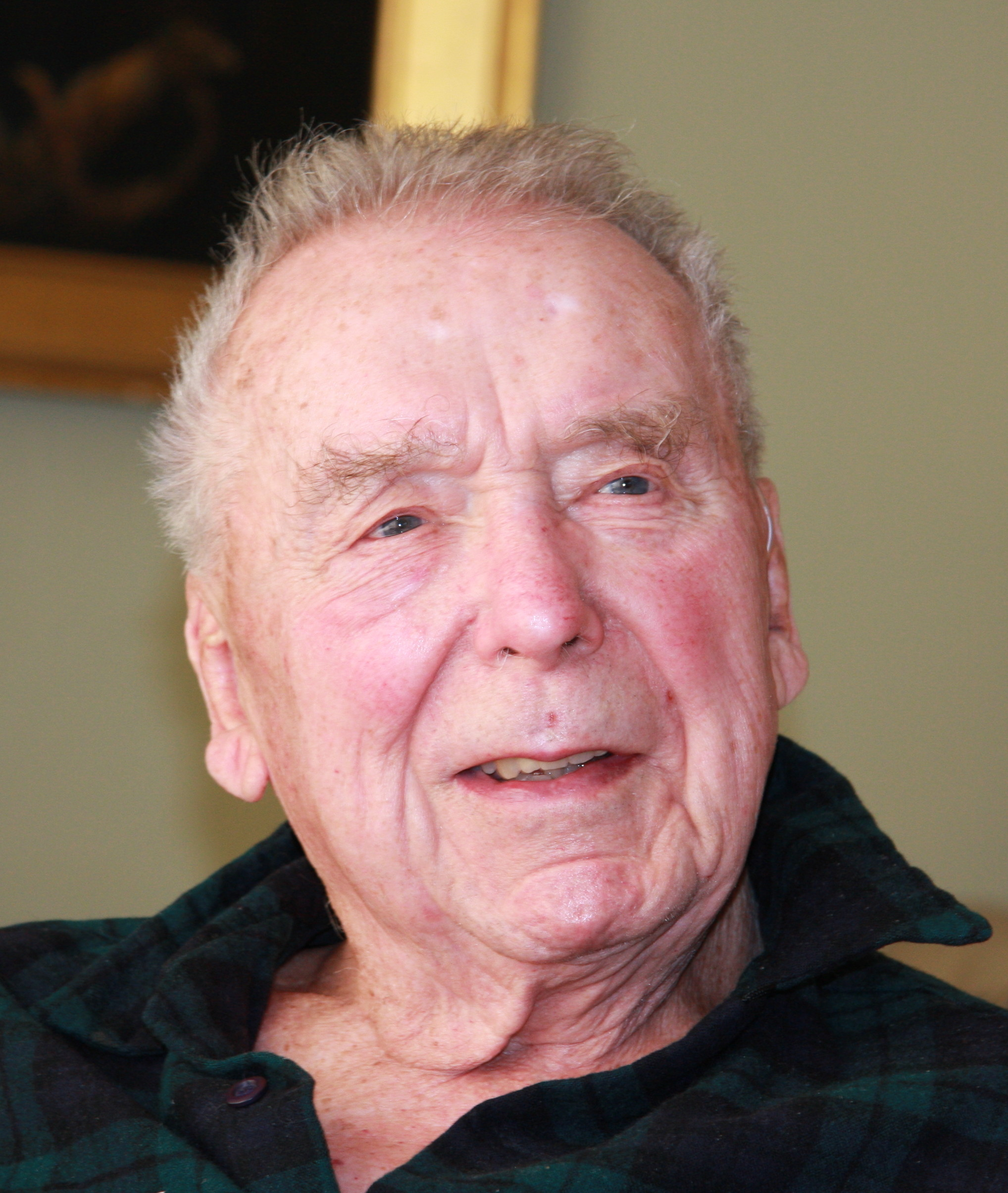
Charles Houston in 2008.

Unlike many other K2 expeditions which have ended in acrimony and bitterness, such as Wiessner's 1939 expedition and the successful Italian expedition of 1954, the 1953 expedition formed lifelong bonds of friendship between its members. Houston remarked that "we entered the mountain as strangers, but we left it as brothers", while Bates would later say that "the Brotherhood of the Rope established on K2 outlasted the expedition by many decades and was based on a shared sense of values, interests and mutual respect and affection". Because of this, and the bravery and selflessness of the attempt to save Art Gilkey, the expedition has been held up by writers such as Jim Curran as "a symbol of all that is best in mountaineering." Jim Wickwire, who made the first American ascent of K2 in 1978, described their courage and character as "one of the greatest mountaineering stories of all time", and wrote in a letter to Houston that to have climbed on the 1953 expedition would have been even better than climbing K2 in 1978. Many years after the expedition, Reinhold Messner, the first person to climb all fourteen 8000 m peaks, said that while he had great respect for the Italian team which first climbed K2, he had even more respect for the American team, adding that while they failed, "they failed in the most beautiful way you can imagine."

In 1981 the American Alpine Club established the David A. Sowles Memorial Award for "mountaineers who have distinguished themselves, with unselfish devotion at personal risk or sacrifice of a major objective, in going to the assistance of fellow climbers imperilled in the mountains." The surviving members of the Third American Karakoram Expedition were among the first recipients.

Schoening's action in arresting the mass fall has itself achieved iconic status, and is known in American climbing circles simply as "The Belay". Schoening himself, however, was always modest about his achievement, claiming that he was merely lucky.
