= Thondup =

Thondup may refer to:

- 14th Dalai Lama (born 1935 as Lhamo Thondup), spiritual leader of Tibet
- Dawa Thondup, Indian Sherpa mountaineer
- Gyalo Thondup (1928–2025), Tibetan politician and brother of the 14th Dalai Lama
- Palden Thondup Namgyal (1923–1982), last king of Sikkim
