= Pasang Dawa Lama =

Nepalese sherpa, sirdar and a Buddhist lama (1912–1982)

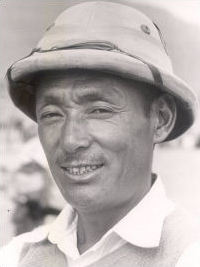
- Born: 1912 near Namche Bazaar, Nepal
- Died: 15 September 1982 (aged 69–70)
- Occupations: Sherpa, sirdar and Buddhist lama
- Known for: First ascent of Cho Oyu 8,188 m (26,864 ft). First ascent of Chomolhari 7,326 m (24,035 ft)

Pasang Dawa Lama (1912 – September 15, 1982) was a Nepalese mountaineer / sirdar and a lama. Pasang is considered to be one of the greatest Sherpa mountaineers of the 20th century. He made the first ascent of Chomolhari 7,326 m (24,035 ft) with Spencer Chapman's expedition in 1937 and the first-ascent of the eight thousander Cho Oyu 8,188 m (26,864 ft) in 1954 whilst climbing with a party of Austrian mountaineers.

== Personal life ==
Pasang Dawa was born near Namche Bazaar in the Khumbu district of Nepal in 1911 and was married several times. He trained as a Buddhist lama in the Nyingma school and around 1939 he took on the name Pasang Dawa Lama.

== Mountaineering career ==
His first taste of high-altitude mountaineering was in 1929 when his father took him to the porter selection for Paul Bauer's expedition to Kangchenjunga. (Note: on page 29 Bauer states that "A lively young herdsman from Nepal had been brought by his father to be inspected. When he was accepted, he executed a dance of joy, throwing his hat in the air. He turned out to be one of our best men, his name is Pasang (or Pashang)". On page 96 Bauer describes Pasang as "a sturdy, jolly youth of twenty-two" but if he was born in 1912 he would have been about 17 years old at the time, however the correct 'Himalayan Club Number' for Pasang Dawa is given on page 142. Spencer Chapman also confirms that he took on "a less experienced porter, Pasang (Sherpa), who had been with Bauer in 1929. The Himalayan Club Tigers list confirms that Pasang (Sherpa) on Spencer Chapman's expedition has the same 'Himalayan Club Number' as Pasang on the 1929 Kanchenjunga expedition.") Pasang reached 7,190 m (23,590 ft), that was the expedition's high point and they were forced back from there by bad weather.

Pasang was part of Spencer Chapman's expedition to Chomolhari in 1937. Chapman had envisaged that the more experienced Pasang Kikuli would be part of the summit team but it was Spencer Chapman and Pasang Dawa who reached the summit on 21 May 1937, they then endured a protracted and epic descent.

In 1939, Pasang participated in the expedition to K2 led by Fritz Wiessner. The two men were not carrying supplemental oxygen, they were very close to reaching the summit when the cautious Pasang asked not to continue climbing as night had fallen. The pair were unable to return for a second attempt. He was awarded a Tiger Badge by the Himalayan Club in 1939, his 'Himalayan Club Number' was 139.

In 1954, along with Herbert Tichy and Sepp Jöchler, Pasang made the first ascent of Cho Oyu.

In 1956, Pasang was sirdar for the 1956 Swiss expedition to Everest and Lhotse, that made the first successful ascent of Lhotse, and the second and third ascents of Everest.

Pasang's last expedition was in 1965 when he was recruited by Mohan Singh Kohli to join a team on a secretive mission to Nanda Devi. The mission involved placing a nuclear listening device on the mountain and in order to join the para-military operation he was recruited as a junior officer in the Indo-Tibetan Border Police.
