= Pete Schoening =

American mountaineer

Peter Kittilsby Schoening (July 30, 1927 – September 22, 2004) was an American mountaineer. Schoening was one of two Americans to first successfully climb the Pakistani peak Gasherbrum I in 1958, along with Andrew Kauffman, and was one of the first to summit Mount Vinson in Antarctica in 1966.

Schoening is perhaps best remembered for his heroics during "The Belay" while part of the American K2 expedition in 1953, where he single-handedly averted the loss of the entire expedition.

== Biography ==
=== Early years ===
Schoening was born July 30, 1927, in Seattle, Washington to John and Gudrun Schoening, and grew up in Seattle. He dropped out of school to serve in the US Navy in the last year of World War II. Later, he earned a degree in chemical engineering from the University of Washington, where he became involved in mountain climbing.

=== The Belay ===
In August 1953, the same year that Sir Edmund Hillary and Tenzing Norgay climbed Everest, an American team of seven, led by Charles Houston, set out to climb K2. On the seventh day, climbing without oxygen in a storm, they became trapped at over 25,000 feet (7,600 meters) on the Abruzzi Ridge. One of the expedition members, Art Gilkey, collapsed with deep venous thrombosis, followed by pulmonary embolism. Realizing Gilkey would surely die if not taken off the mountain immediately, they began to lower Gilkey, wrapped in a sleeping bag, over treacherous rock and ice in the middle of the storm.

While attempting to traverse an ice sheet, climber George Irving Bell lost his footing, pulling Tony Streather loose. Streather fell into the rope joining Charles Houston and Bob Bates. Bates and Houston fell into the rope connecting Dee Molenaar to Gilkey. Schoening, despite already holding Gilkey on belay during the attempted traverse to Camp VII, was able, through strength, quickness, and skill to arrest the fall of all six men, with his ice axe wedged against a boulder frozen in the mountainside. Schoening considered himself merely lucky, but his companions felt otherwise.

During the team's scramble to recover from the fall and establish a forced bivouac, they discovered that Gilkey, who had been in voice contact with them and was still suspended in the protective sleeping bag from a line secured on either side of the ice axe, had vanished in a slide along with the supporting anchors. Houston, among others, has speculated that Gilkey cut himself loose following Bell's fall to save the lives of his five colleagues, who were variously injured and at risk for their own safety.

The story of the expedition is told in the book K2 — The Savage Mountain by Houston and Bates. Today, The Belay is considered to be one of the most famous events in mountaineering history. Schoening's ice axe is currently on display at the Bradford Washburn American Mountaineering Museum in Golden, Colorado.

Schoening's actions clearly saved the lives of five of his climbing partners. He was awarded the David A. Sowles Memorial Award for his heroics by the American Alpine Club in 1981 as a "mountaineer who has distinguished himself, with unselfish devotion at personal risk or sacrifice of a major objective, in going to the assistance of fellow climbers imperiled in the mountains."

=== Later years ===
In May 1996 at age 68, he went to Everest together with his nephew Klev Schoening, as one of the clients on the Mountain Madness expedition, as led by Scott Fischer. The elder Schoening stopped his ascent well short of the summit, at Camp Three, after being diagnosed with an irregular heartbeat while his nephew continued on; Klev survived the ascent. The disastrous events of that week are recounted in several books, including Into Thin Air by Jon Krakauer and The Climb by Anatoli Boukreev.

In 2004, he died of bone cancer at his home in Kenmore, Washington at the age of 77.

=== Legacy ===
Fifty-three years later, in 2006, the descendants of the men on the belay got together, calling themselves "The Children of 'The Belay'". Attending were 28 children and grandchildren who would have never been born if it were not for Pete Schoening and his ice axe high on K2.

Schoening Peak in the Vinson Massif, Antarctica is named after Pete Schoening. Putrid Pete's Peak (P3), a prominence along the north rim of Snoqualmie Pass in Washington was also named after him.
