= Dawa Thondup =

Sherpa mountaineer

Dawa Thondup (1907-1973) (also Da Thondup, Dawa Tendrup or Da Thundu) was a Sherpa mountaineer from the Nepali village of Khumjung. He had been a porter on the 1933 British Mount Everest expedition, he survived the 1934 Nanga Parbat climbing disaster, and he was a team member on a 1935 expedition led by James Waller and John Hunt to Saltoro Kangri. In 1937, he was with Hunt again during an expedition in the Kanchenjunga area. The next year, he was part of a group led by James Waller that attempted to climb Masherbrum. Thondup was a "first-class porter" on that expedition; with Waller, he reached Camp 6, at 23,500 feet, and had been picked for the second summit team, but the first team returned because of bad weather and all climbers descended.

Thondup participated in the disastrous 1939 American Karakoram expedition to K2. He may have been part of the English-Swiss expedition in 1950 that was the first to summit Abi Gamin. and was a porter on the Swiss expedition to Everest in 1952. He also participated in 1953 British Mount Everest expedition led by Col. John Hunt. He was again on Everest in the 1955 International Himalayan Expedition, headed by Norman Dyhrenfurth.

In 1935 he was awarded the German Red Cross Medal for the part he played during the 1934 Nanga Parbat climbing disaster. He was also awarded a Tiger Badge by the Himalayan Club for his part in the 1939 American Karakoram expedition to K2, his 'Himalayan Club Number' was 49.

== Personal life ==
Pinju Norbu, also known as Pinzo Nurbu or Pintso Norbu, who was one of the porters who died in the storm on the 1934 Nanga Parbat expedition was his younger brother. Another porter on that expedition, Kitar Dorje, was his father-in-law.

After the Swiss Everest expedition in 1952 he re-married, his new wife was about 30 years his junior and had been born and raised in his home village of Khumjung but the couple relocated to Darjeeling almost immediately.

In 1973 he joined several members of the 1953 Everest expedition on a trek in Nepal but he died soon after, at the age of 66.
