= Bernard Pierre =

French mountaineer

Personal information
- Born: 27 July 1920 Chelles, France
- Died: 10 August 1997 (aged 77) Neuilly-sur-Seine, France
- Occupations: lawyer, author, and businessman

Climbing career
- Type of climber: mountaineering
- First ascents: Salcantay, Nun, Mount Damavand

Bernard Pierre (1920–1997) was a French mountaineer, notable as a climber and an expedition leader.

== Biography ==
Born in Chelles, Pierre was trained as a lawyer and ran his family's textile business, and was a mountaineer on the side.

He made a number of notable ascents in the Alps, including of the north face of the Aiguille du Dru and the northwest face of La Civetta. With Gaston Rébuffat he made the second ascent of the Piz Badile's northeast face, and was a lead climber on the first ascents of a route on the Aiguille des Aigles and the face of the Aiguille de la Brenva. In 1951 he climbed in the Hoggar Mountains in southern Algeria, making a number of first ascents—he returned to the mountain range in 1961. In 1952, he led a French-American expedition including Claude Kogan to the Andes, and made the first ascent of Salcantay.

Pierre also led the team which made the first ascent of Nun in India. He was part of the group which set out from a high camp towards the summit on 28 August 1953 but he could not continue to the top because he had not fully recovered from being caught in an avalanche a few days earlier. Later that same day Claude Kogan and Pierre Vittoz reached the summit. He led a French-Iranian expedition to Mount Damavand for its first ascent in 1954, an expedition to the Rwenzori Mountains in 1955–1956, and to the Caucasus in 1958.

Pierre also wrote a number of books about his expeditions, including books on synthetic textiles and rivers of the world.

He was a member of the elite French 'Groupe de Haute Montagne', and Past President (1991-1995) of the Société des explorateurs français, Honorary member of the Alpine Club, the American Alpine Club, and the Himalayan Club.
