= George Irving Bell =

American physicist, biologist and mountaineer (1926–2000)

- Born: August 4, 1926; Evanston, Illinois, United States
- Died: May 28, 2000 (aged 73); Los Alamos, New Mexico, United States
- Education: Harvard University (B.S. Physics); Cornell University (Ph.D. Theoretical Physics)
- Known for: Human Genome Project Immune cycle
- Scientific career
- Fields: Theoretical Physics
- Doctoral advisor: Hans Bethe

George Irving Bell (August 4, 1926 – May 28, 2000) was an American physicist, biologist, and mountaineer, and a grandson of John Joseph Seerley. He died in 2000 from complications of leukemia after surgery.

== Education ==
Bell received a bachelor's degree in physics from Harvard University in 1947. He studied theoretical physics with Hans Bethe at Cornell University, obtaining his doctorate in 1951.

== Physics ==
Immediately after receiving his Ph.D., Bell went to the Los Alamos Scientific Laboratory and joined the "T Division." At the time, this division was primarily occupied in the design of the first thermonuclear weapon. Bell contributed by solving problems of neutron transport.

Such problems are also crucial in the design and analysis of nuclear reactors, so it was natural that Bell became a leading expert on the physics of reactors. He co-authored the book Nuclear Reactor Theory with Samuel Glasstone.

== Biology ==
Bell's interests turned to biology in the 1960s, creating quantitative models in immunology. He headed the Theoretical Biology and Biophysics group at Los Alamos from 1974 to 1990. He also worked on mathematical models in biophysics. In 1988, he became the founding director of the Center for Human Genome Studies, which became a major participant in the Human Genome Project. He was director for only one year (simultaneously acting as the head of T Division and the group leader for the Theoretical Biology and Biophysics group) and retired from Los Alamos in 1990. He continued to work as an associate of the laboratory until September 1999.

Bell was the author of over 100 research papers and the co-editor of Theoretical Immunology (1978) and Computers and DNA (1989; ISBN 0-201-51505-9).

== Mountaineering ==
Bell was an avid and accomplished mountaineer and participated in some of the most notable American expeditions of the 1950s and 1960s. His first climbs were during his high school years, in the Tetons, and he was an active participant in the Harvard Mountaineering Club. In the 1940s, he made first ascents of four peaks in the area around Mount Waddington in the Coast Range of British Columbia, on an HMC expedition. During this period, he also climbed in the Tetons, the Wind River Range, and the Cascades.

Bell then moved to more significant objectives, organizing the expedition in 1950 that made the first ascent of Yerupajá, 21,769 feet (6,635 m), in the Huayhuash mountain range of Peru, one of the most difficult and dangerous peaks in the Andes. Bell did not make the summit but reached an altitude of 20,600 ft (6,300 m). He returned to Peru in 1952 to make the first ascent of another steep and difficult peak of the Peruvian Andes, Salcantay in the Vilcabamba mountain range. He made two significant return trips to Peru in 1954 and 1956.

Bell also climbed in the Karakoram of Pakistan, participating in two very notable expeditions. In 1953, Bell took part in the Third American Karakoram Expedition to K2 and was one of five climbers who fell during a failed attempt of the first ascent of the peak. Their fall was arrested by Pete Schoening in one of the greatest feats of mountaineering. Bell went on several more Himalayan expeditions and made the first ascent of Masherbrum, the 22nd highest peak in the world, in 1960.

Bell's son, also named George, is also a climber.
