= House's Chimney =

Rock wall crack on K2

House's Chimney, named after American climber Bill House, is a 30-metre (100 ft) tall crack in a rock wall, located on the Abruzzi Spur of K2, a mountain on the China–Pakistan border.

The 'chimney' was first climbed, and named, when House free climbed it on the 1938 American K2 expedition. It is between the sites that were used for Camp 4 and Camp 5 on their ascent but more recent expeditions normally use fewer camps than the early climbers and for most modern teams it will be between Camp 1 and Camp 2.

If free climbed the technical grade is 5.6 (4c), but it is located at an elevation of 6,600 metres (21,500 ft) and even Pete Boardman who climbed it in 1980, before it was festooned with fixed ropes, was "impressed and surprised at its technical difficulty". However, by 1986 an Elektron Ladder has commonly been used to provide assistance and now that commercial expeditions regularly take clients up the Abruzzi Spur, and House's Chimney has been determined as the safest route to climb higher up the mountain, a ladder is usually in situ.
