= Dee Molenaar =

American mountain climber

- Born: June 21, 1918; Los Angeles, California, U.S.
- Died: January 19, 2020 (aged 101); Burlington, Washington, U.S.
- Education: University of Washington (BSc)

Dee Molenaar (June 21, 1918 – January 19, 2020) was an American mountaineer, author and artist. He is best known as the author of The Challenge of Rainier, first published in 1971 and considered the definitive work on the climbing history of Mount Rainier.

== Biography ==
Molenaar was born in Los Angeles, California, to Dutch immigrant parents, Marina (van Paasschen) and Peter Molenaar. During World War II, he served as a photographer in the U.S. Coast Guard in the Aleutian Islands and western Pacific. In 1950, he earned a BSc degree in geology at the University of Washington, and then served as civilian adviser at Camp Hale and the Mountain Warfare Training Center.

Molenaar worked as a park ranger and mountain guide in Mount Rainier National Park, climbing the mountain over 50 times as a guide and on personal trips, via more than a dozen different routes including three first ascents. He participated in the 1946 second ascent of Mount Saint Elias in Alaska. He was a member of the Third American Karakoram Expedition, a 1953 mountaineering expedition to K2 in which the party became trapped during a severe storm. Along with "Big Jim" Jim Whittaker and Robert F. Kennedy, he was a member of the 1965 climb and first ascent of Mount Kennedy in the Yukon, named after John F. Kennedy.

His career with the United States Geological Survey took him to Alaska, Colorado, Utah, and Washington, until his retirement in 1983. On April 7, 2012, the American Alpine Club inducted Molenaar into its Hall of Mountaineering Excellence at an award ceremony in Golden, Colorado. He met his wife Colleen on Mount Rainier and they had three children together. Molenaar turned 100 in June 2018 and died on January 19, 2020, at an adult care home in Burlington, Washington.

== Art ==
Molenaar painted in watercolors and oils. He is known for his impressionism-style art with mountain and desert landscapes the dominant theme in his works. He painted the highest watercolor in history, spending 10 days in a tent painting K2 from memory at 25,000 feet during a severe storm that hit during the 1953 expedition. With precious fuel for melting snow running low, his teammates made him drink the remaining water colored with pigments.

== Bibliography ==
- Molenaar, Dee (2005) [9th printing, original 3rd edition 1979]. The Challenge of Rainier: a record of the explorations and ascents, triumphs and tragedies, on the Northwest's greatest mountain (3rd ed.). Mountaineers Books. p. 364. ISBN 0-916890-70-8.
- Molenaar, Dee (September 1, 2009). Mountains Don't Care, But We Do. Mountaineers Books. p. 208. ISBN 978-0615293240.
- Molenaar, Dee (September 16, 2012). Memoirs of a Dinosaur Mountaineer. CreateSpace Independent Publishing Platform. p. 342. ISBN 978-1479321902.
- Terrell, Karen Molenaar (September 7, 2018) Are You Taking Me Home Now?: Adventures with Dad p. 241 ISBN 1726134350
- Terrell, Karen Molenaar (March 16, 2020) The Second Hundred Years: Further Adventures with Dad p. 243 ISBN 979-8622825941
