= Vittorio Sella =

Italian photographer and mountaineer (1859–1943)

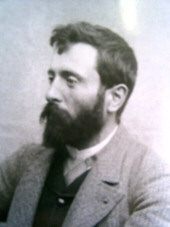
- Sella in 1899
- Born: 28 August 1859; Biella, Kingdom of Sardinia
- Died: 12 August 1943 (aged 83); Biella, Italy
- Known for: His works of mountain photography
- Relatives: Quintino Sella (uncle)

Vittorio Sella (28 August 1859 – 12 August 1943) was an Italian photographer and mountaineer, whose photographs of mountains are regarded as some of the finest ever made.

== Life and career ==
Sella was born in Biella in the foothills of the Alps and acquired his interest in Alpinism from his uncle, Quintino Sella. He made a number of significant climbs in the Alps, including the first winter ascents of the Matterhorn and Monte Rosa, and the first winter traverse of Mont Blanc. He took part in several expeditions further afield, including three to the Caucasus (where a peak now bears his name), to Mount Saint Elias in Alaska, to the Rwenzori in Africa, and the 1909 expedition to K2 and the Karakoram. The latter three expeditions were in the company of Luigi Amedeo, Duke of the Abruzzi. Sella continued to climb into his old age, and made his last attempt on the Matterhorn at seventy six. The attempt failed when one of his guides was injured in an accident.

== Photography ==
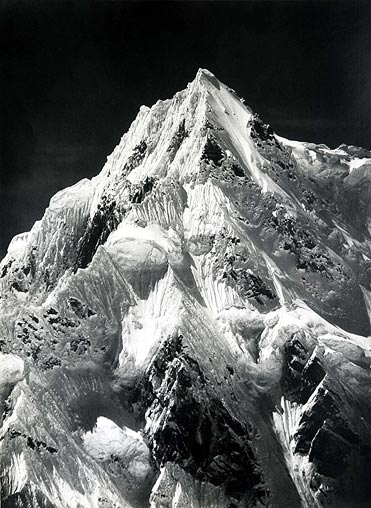
Sella's photograph of Siniolchu in the Himalayas, taken from the Zemu Glacier

The high quality of Sella's photography was in part due to his use of 30×40 cm photographic plates, in spite of the difficulty of carrying bulky and fragile equipment into remote places. He had to invent equipment, including modified pack saddles and rucksacks, to allow these particularly large glass plates to be transported safely. His photographs were widely published and exhibited, and highly praised; Ansel Adams, who saw thirty-one that Sella had presented to the US Sierra Club, said they inspired "a definitely religious awe". Many of the photographs he took were of mountains which had not been previously recorded and so have historical as well as artistic significance; for example by recording the retreat of glaciers in the Rwenzori mountains in Central Africa.

== Death and legacy ==
Sella died in Biella in 1943. His collection of photographs is now managed by the Sella Foundation (Fondazione Sella) in Biella (Vittorio Sella photographs). A selection of pictures made by Sella is exhibited in the Museo Nazionale della Montagna "Duca degli Abruzzi" in Turin. Some of his photographs of the Rwenzori mountains are owned by Makerere University in Kampala, Uganda.
