= Charles Snead Houston =

American mountain climber (1913–2009)

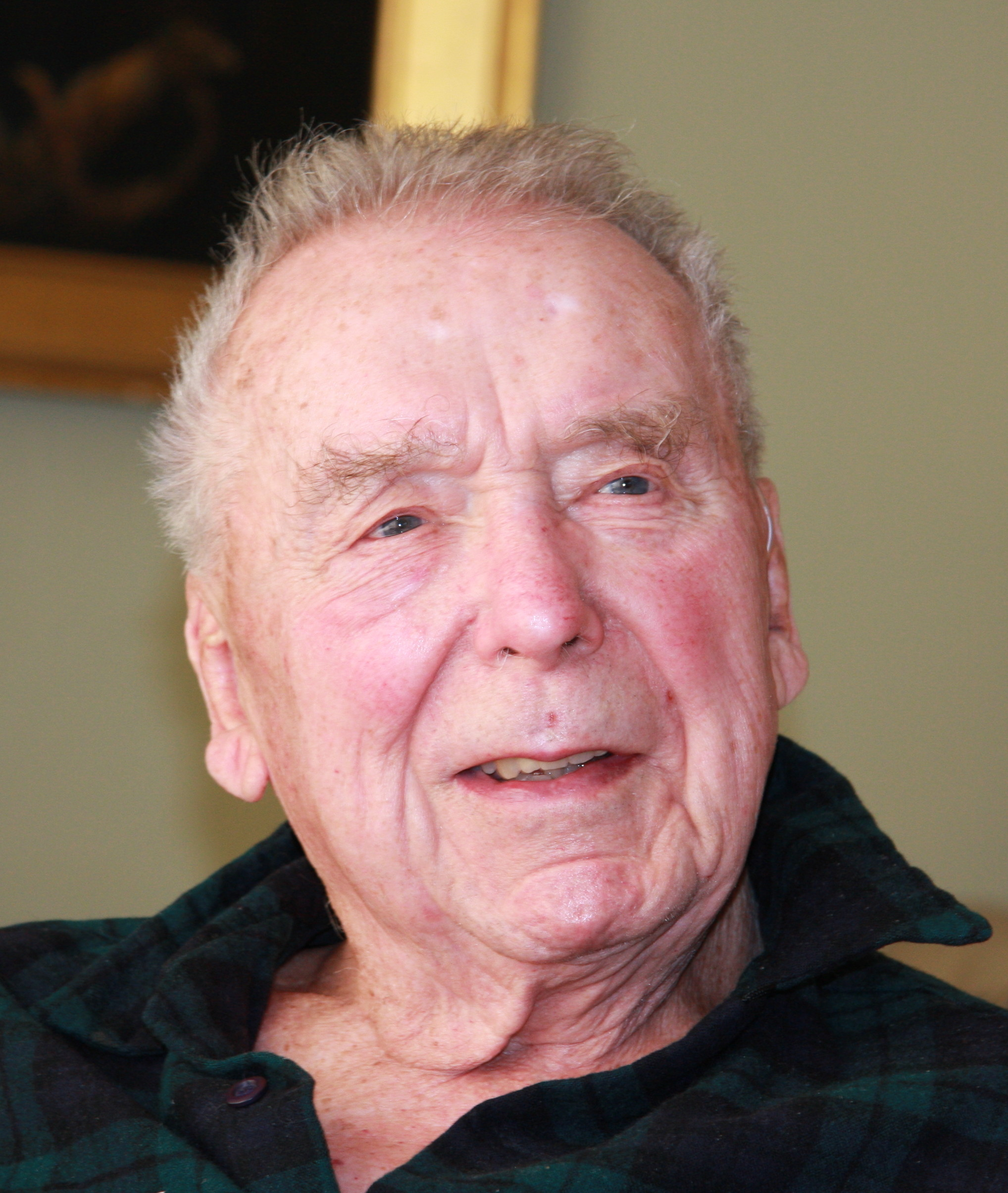
- Born: August 24, 1913; New York City, New York, U.S.
- Died: September 27, 2009 (aged 96); Burlington, Vermont, U.S.
- Education: Harvard College; Columbia University College of Physicians and Surgeons
- Occupations: Physician; mountaineer; scientist; Peace Corps administrator
- Spouse: Dorcas Laidley Tiemeyer (m. 1941; died 1999)
- Children: 4 (2 daughters and 2 sons)
- Parents: Oscar Rempel Houston (father); Nelly Snead MacDonald (mother)

Charles Snead Houston (Note: Often known as Charlie. Houston is pronounced /ˈhaʊstən/ HOW-stən.) (August 24, 1913 – September 27, 2009) was an American physician, mountaineer, high-altitude investigator, inventor, author, film-maker, and former Peace Corps administrator. He made two important and celebrated attempts to climb the mountain K2 in the Karakoram Range.

== Early life and education ==
Houston was born in New York in 1913 and grew up in Great Neck on Long Island. He was educated at The Hotchkiss School and Harvard University, and he earned a Doctor of Medicine from Columbia University College of Physicians and Surgeons.

== Mountaineering ==
Houston began climbing in the Alps with his father where they met Scottish mountaineer T. Graham Brown. He then gained experience on several expeditions to Canada and America making the second ascent of Mount Foraker in 1934, with T. Graham Brown and Chychele Waterston. In 1936, Houston was a member of the British–American Himalayan Expedition led by the British climber H.W. Tilman to the top of Nanda Devi in India, the highest mountain climbed at that time. In 1938, he was the leader of the first American Karakoram expedition to K2. Although he did not reach the summit, his party mapped a route to the top that was later used by the Italian team that first summited the mountain in 1954. In 1950 Houston and Tilman led a trekking expedition to the Khumbu Glacier, just west of Mount Everest. They were the first Westerners to get there (and amongst the first mountaineers to be allowed into Nepal). They examined the Khumbu Icefall to see whether it provided a means of climbing Everest and were the first observers of the higher parts of Everest from Khumbu - the route subsequently taken by Sir Edmund Hillary in Everest's first successful ascent.

He attempted K2 again in 1953 (see Third American Karakoram Expedition). A member of the team, Art Gilkey, became ill (probably with thrombophlebitis) as they approached the summit. The team reversed direction and tried to carry Gilkey down. However, he was lost in a disastrous cascade of events precipitated by a fall whereupon multiple ropes became entangled, resulting in most of the team sliding out of control roped together down the mountain. When the last roped man, Pete Schoening, was about to be plucked off by the accelerating climbers, he was remarkably able to arrest the fall of all six climbers using an ice axe belay. "The Belay" was one of the most famous events in mountaineering history.

After the 1953 K2 expedition, Houston (then age 40) never participated on any further technical climbs.

== Medical practice and teaching ==
Houston practiced internal medicine in Exeter, New Hampshire and Aspen, Colorado. Later, he joined the faculty at the University of Vermont as Professor of Medicine. He retired from the faculty in 1979.

== Medical research ==
Houston began his study of the effects of high altitude as a naval flight surgeon in World War II. He was in charge of Operation Everest (1947) in which four subjects were taken to a simulated altitude of 8850 m over 34 days in a compression chamber. These studies demonstrated that careful acclimatization would allow pilots to fly unpressurized planes to altitudes of 15,000 feet and higher. This capacity afforded the US Army Air Force an important tactical advantage.

He was among the first to study High Altitude Pulmonary Edema (1958), and High Altitude Retinal Hemorrhage (1968). He authored numerous books and articles about mountain medicine. Starting in 1975, he organized the International Hypoxia Symposia in the Canadian Rockies.

In 1996 he was awarded the King Albert Medal of Merit to honor his "singular achievements" in the mountain world .

Houston was also involved with early attempts to construct an artificial heart. Although not successful, his design was influential in later developments, including the Jarvik-7 model that was used with some success.

== Peace Corps service ==
From 1962 to 1965, Houston served as the first Country Director of the Peace Corps for India. During his tenure, the volunteers in India grew from 6 to 250. He was instrumental in developing a doctors' division within the Corps.

== Works by Charles S. Houston ==
Robert H. Bates; Charles S. Houston (1939). Five Miles High. New York, NY: The Lyons Press.

Charles S. Houston; Robert H. Bates (1954). K2, The Savage Mountain. New York, NY: The Lyons Press.

Charles S. Houston (1980). Going high, the story of man and altitude. American Alpine Club.

Charles S. Houston (1982). High Altitude Physiology Study: Collected Papers. Arctic Institute of North America.

Sutton, John R.; Houston, Charles S.; Coates, Geoffrey (1987). Hypoxia and cold. New York: Praeger. ISBN 027592081X.

Charles Houston (1993). High altitude: illness and wellness. Merrillville, IN: ICS Books. ISBN 9780934802727.

Charles Houston (2005). Going Higher: Oxygen Man and Mountains (5th ed.). Seattle, WA: The Mountaineers Books.
