= Norman Streatfeild =

Norman Streatfeild was a decorated English artillery officer who was killed during the Dunkirk evacuation. He served primarily in British India during the Interwar period.

== Biography ==
Norman was educated at Marlborough College and the Royal Military Academy, which was then located in Woolwich, obtaining his commission in 1923. Norman joined the Royal Regiment of Artillery, and in 1924 he went to India and saw considerable service there over the next 14 or so years. India was at that time under the British Empire and constituted a much larger part of South Asia than the present-day state. By 1932 he was a lieutenant. In 1936 he was a captain in the 7th (Bengal) Mountain Battery, Royal Artillery.

== Family ==
Norman was born on February 29, 1904, a leap year baby, the eldest child of Rev Roland Streatfeild and his wife Maude, née Watney. Roland was the son of the Rev. William Champion Streatfeild and Maude was the daughter of James Watney, the brewer. Their family home was Hoseyrigge, Westerham. He never married.

== Military Cross ==
On June 6, 1937 whilst still a captain he was commanding the battery, he was awarded the Military Cross (MC) “for conspicuous gallantry in the field” during the military operations in Waziristan, upon the North-West Frontier of India. He commanded the 7th (Bengal) Mountain Battery during the advance from Dosalli to the Sham Plain. He brought a section of the battery into action in the open under very accurate enemy fire, and as the attack progressed advanced with his guns regardless of danger, so that the foremost troops were never without support. “His gallant example and skilful handling of the battery”, the report says, “contributed materially to the success of the operation.” The photo shows him receiving the MC in the field.

== American Alpine Club Expedition to K2 ==
A keen mountaineer he was appointed liaison officer to the French expedition to the Hiddon peak in 1936. In 1938 he was appointed liaison officer to the American Alpine Club Expedition to K2 on the border between Pakistan's northern territories, and the Taxkorgan Tajik Autonomous County of Xinjiang, China.

== Recall to England and death ==
In mid-1938 Norman was recalled to England to teach in the Artillery School at Larkhill. At the beginning of the Second World War he was again serving with his battery with the first British Expeditionary Force in France and had been promoted to major.

He was killed at sea during the evacuation from Dunkirk on 29 May 1940. His final resting place is unknown, probably at sea. His name is listed on Column 7 of the Dunkirk Memorial. From details which were received from a brother officer, it appears that Major Streatfeild who was a member of the B.E.F. was evacuated from Dunkirk and was seen to go abroad the destroyer Grafton in the Tuesday evening of the evacuation. There were about 28 officers on board, and they all went below decks in the after part of the destroyer. Later the ship was torpedoed. Of the 28 officers it is believed that only three were rescued. The destroyer Grafton is recorded as being sunk by German torpedoes.
