= Tiger Badge =

Award for experienced Sherpas

The Tiger Badge was awarded to experienced climbing porters by the Himalayan Club so that "the better Sherpas should be in some way distinguished and rewarded by higher rates of pay". Each bronze badge displays a Tiger's head in relief with a peak in the background, the legend around the edge reads "Himalayan Club", on the reverse the porter's name and Himalayan Club Number are engraved.

== History ==
During the mid-1930s the Himalayan Club set about compiling a register of porters based in Darjeeling, those on the register were issued with a 'chit book' which would be used to record their mountaineering resume so that subsequent expeditions had a reliable record of the experience of those they might employ. The Himalayan Club published a list of those on the register with their date of birth and a brief summary of high-altitude experience, along with their number on the register (the 'Himalayan Club Number' which was assigned to each because so many had similar names). Despite the similarity of many porter names, and the varied spellings used for them in different expedition reports, the 'Himalayan Club Numbers' of porters were often not included in expedition reports, but Kenneth Mason was able to include the 'Himalayan Club Number' for many of the porters mentioned in his "pioneering history of Himalayan exploration" because had been the editor of the Himalayan Journal from its inception in 1929 through to 1940.

The term 'tiger' was adopted during the course of the 1924 British Mount Everest expedition. The expedition was beset by a period of poor weather and four porters became stranded on the North Col for four days when all of the European mountaineers were lower on the mountain. The porters were eventually rescued but for the final day of that period the porters had no food left, that event, along with the poor weather conditions, had so demoralised the porters that only a small group were prepared to continue supporting the climbing efforts. It was at that point in the 1924 British Mount Everest expedition that the term 'tiger' was adopted for "the picked fifteen porters on whom now all our hopes centred". The same term was later used on a series of expeditions to major Himalayan peaks including the German expeditions to Nanga Parbat who referred to the "Himalayan 'tigers' from Darjeeling".

The initial proposal for a Tiger badge was to "create a superior grade for experienced climbing porters" who would receive a higher rate of pay for their work on subsequent expeditions. However that proposal was refined so that they would receive "8 annas (50 paise or half a rupee) a day extra pay beyond the rate paid to others, for work above the snow-line", the snow-line stipulation being added to recognise the application of their expertise in those areas without compromising their chance of employment on more ordinary treks where their climbing skill and experience was less relevant.

The leaders of expeditions to the higher peaks were asked to recommend porters for the award of the Tiger Badge and the Committee of the Himalayan Club reviewed their recommendations and decided which porters should be awarded this higher grade. The first badges were awarded in 1939 and a group of porters who took part in the 1965 Indian Everest Expedition were the last to be awarded the badges.

The badges were awarded only to a select few and between the initiation of the badge in 1939 and the final awards in 1965 there were 66 recipients. A full list was published by the Himalayan Club in 1967 although the names of Nawang Topgay and Nawang Gombu were inadvertently omitted, the list on the Club website includes those two names. In addition to a higher rate of pay, the recipients gained additional respect and status, it was also felt that the prestige associated with holding a badge would spur other porters to match the Tiger's high standards. The final eight names on the list of Tiger Badge holders have consecutive Himalayan Club numbers, the final one being 369, suggesting that rather less than 20% of the registered porters were awarded Tiger Badges.

== Garud Medal ==
The period between the independence of India in 1947 and the foundation of the Indian Mountaineering Foundation in 1961 was punctuated by the opening of Nepal to mountaineers in 1949/50, and the annexation of Tibet by the PRC in 1950 these events moved the focus of mountaineering expeditions and sherpa recruitment from Darjeeling and the last Tiger Badges were issued in 1965.

The Garud Medal, which was instituted by the Himalayan Club in the 21st century, is a related initiative. It is awarded to individuals who have "excelled over the years in serving / working for expeditions, performed an exemplary act of help, support or rescue to a party in the mountains".
