= Richard Davison =

Richard Davison may refer to:

- Richard Davison (politician)
- Richard Davison (equestrian)

== See also ==
- Richard Davidson (disambiguation)
- Richard Davisson, American physicist
