= Presidential Fitness Test =

School physical fitness test in the United States

The Presidential Fitness Test is a national physical fitness testing program that was conducted in United States public middle and high schools from the late 1950s until 2013, when it was replaced with the Presidential Youth Fitness Program. On July 31, 2025, President Donald Trump signed an executive order to reinstate the Presidential Fitness Test in public schools nationwide.

National interest in physical fitness testing has existed in the United States since the late 1800s. Early testing generally focused on anthropometric measurement (such as lung capacity or strength assessment) and was facilitated by organizations that emerged at the time, such as the American Association for the Advancement of Physical Education, and the American Alliance for Health, Physical Education, Recreation (AAHPER). By the early 1900s, physical fitness testing had transitioned to focus more on the concept of "physical efficiency", a term used to describe the healthy function of bodily systems. During the early 1900s, the purpose of the fitness tests shifted more toward determining "motor ability", and consisted of climbing, running, and jumping exercises. During and after World War I, fitness testing and physical training for children increased in schools and garnered attention from governmental agencies, as they were linked to preparedness for combat. A similar process occurred during and after World War II, when military, public health, and education services held conferences and published manuals on the topic of youth fitness.

In the 1950s, American government agencies were re-assessing education in general, especially regarding increasing the United States' ability to compete with the Soviet Union. For example, as a direct reaction to the Soviet Union's successful launch of the first Earth orbiting satellite, Sputnik, in 1957, Congress passed the National Defense Education Act of 1958. The act allocated funding to American universities, specifically aimed at improving programs in science, mathematics, and foreign languages. Physical education and fitness were also among the topics of reassessment during the 1950s. The AAHPER appointed a committee on physical education, which recommended that public schools shift their programs away from obstacle courses and boxing, the likes of which were popular during World War II, and toward a more balanced approach to recreation, including games, sports, and outdoor activities.

== History ==
=== The Kraus–Weber test ===
The impetus for the style of physical testing that developed into the Presidential Fitness Test was a research study conducted by Dr. Hans Kraus and Dr. Sonya Weber in the early 1950s. The study, originally connected to their research in lower back pain, resulted in a diagnostic test for muscular fitness called the "Minimum Muscular Fitness Test", which later came to be known as the "Kraus–Weber Fitness Test". As its original name implies, Drs. Kraus and Weber considered the test to determine minimum fitness levels; it consisted only of six basic exercises.

One of their experiments involved conducting the fitness test on 4,000 children on the East Coast, which showed that 56.6% of children between 6 and 16 failed the test. The high rate of failure alarmed the doctors and spurred them to question whether the findings were dependent on location. Dr. Kraus enlarged the experiment, testing 3,000 rural, urban, and suburban children in Italy, Switzerland, and Austria with the help of fitness activist Bonnie Prudden. On average, they found that only 8.2% of European children failed the test. From their results, Drs. Kraus and Weber concluded that, despite American children's high standard of living, they lacked "sufficient exercise to keep them at the minimum level of muscular fitness." The study had a sensational effect on American media, provoking alarm in parents, school administrators, and government officials. In 1955, government officials, including John Kelly, the National Director of physical fitness during WWII, approached President Eisenhower with the findings of the study. Moved by the seemingly alarming results, Eisenhower called a meeting of various sports and fitness authorities and appointed Vice President Richard Nixon as the chair of a new presidential committee dedicated to developing a national fitness program.

A sense of fear and alarm that American children were lagging behind their European counterparts guided public perception of the tests. Dr. Kraus himself interpreted the results of the study as reflective of American affluence, citing how walking less and doing fewer demanding household chores differentiated American children from European children. A Sports Illustrated article from 1955 elaborates on conclusions that were publicly drawn from the comparative Kraus–Weber study. The article, in keeping with the consensus of the time, identifies the cause of American children's low test scores as "America's plush standard of living", which derived from "a number of factors ranging from the playpen to the school bus to television." The author places the blame for American children's poor performance on parents, arguing that the 54% of 6-year-olds who failed the Kraus–Weber Tests were not physically prepared enough to begin school. The author also points to public schools and their lackluster physical education programs as deserving blame.

Contemporary scholars, however, have since contradicted the popular conclusions from the Kraus–Weber comparative study. The results of the Kraus–Weber tests importantly showed no stratification between wealthy and poor children, thus casting doubt on the idea that less physical activity was the cause of high failure rate. Practice was the key to succeeding at the tests, which Kraus and Weber noted in their research. Physical education in European schools was more similar to the calisthenic-type exercises given on the test; therefore, European children had more experience with the test's movements and performed better. The test also did not measure fitness in a holistic sense, and thus was not necessarily an indicator of general physical fitness in the way American officials and media supposed.

=== Eisenhower presidency ===
In July 1956, President Eisenhower created the President's Council on Youth Fitness by Executive Order. Shortly after, AAHPER established the Youth Fitness Project, which was tasked with conducting an initial study on the fitness of children nationwide. The council adopted and expanded on the testing items from a California testing program, deciding that the basic test would consist of 6 parts: 1) Pull-ups (for boys), modified pull-ups (for girls), 2) sit-ups, 3) shuttle run, 4) standing broad jump, 5) 50-yard dash, and 6) softball throw for distance. The Council later added a 7th item, a 600-yard walk-run, and, after consulting the American Red Cross, listed multiple aquatic tests, which were not widely implemented due to lack of access to swimming facilities at most American schools. In 1958, AAHPER published these items as the first official youth fitness test.

=== Implementation of the test (Kennedy to Bush Sr.) ===
The transition into John F. Kennedy's presidency marked a new era for the Fitness Test. Before he took office, Kennedy advocated for youth physical fitness in his article "The Soft American", published in Sports Illustrated. In the widely popular article, the president fed into Cold War paranoia about American subservience, articulating concerns about children spending too much time watching television and not enough time building strong bodies. "The harsh fact of the matter is that there is also an increasingly large number of young Americans who are neglecting their bodies – whose physical fitness is not what it should be – who are getting soft. And such softness on the part of the individual citizen can help to strip and destroy the vitality of a nation." Linking the supposed state of American youth to the security and futurity of the nation, Kennedy set the stage for the aims of his presidency's Fitness Test.

Kennedy changed the name to the President's Council on Physical Fitness intending to address all age groups. In partnership with the Advertising Council, President Kennedy participated in a nationwide public service advertising campaign that promoted taking the 50-mile hikes previously required of U.S. Marine officers. Kennedy contributed to reinforcing the connection between Cold War anxieties and children's physical performance.

In 1966, Lyndon B. Johnson, Kennedy's successor, established the Presidential Physical Fitness Award Program to acknowledge youth who met or exceeded the 85th percentile on all seven test items. This program later contributed much of the fodder of complaints about the test, inspiring competition and reinitiating relative benchmarks into physical education classes across the nation.

The Physical Fitness Test underwent edits throughout the 70s and 80s. In 1976, the softball throw was deleted, the sit-up was modified, and the distance runs were included as options. While the softball throw was originally theorized as being helpful to mimic the potential throwing arm when faced with the need to throw a grenade, the throw was removed as it was considered to be a skill rather than a fitness-related item. The sit-up was modified on the idea that the bent-knee approach was less stressful on the back than a straight-leg approach. The goals of running for longer distances rather than mimicking the running drills of the Navy also inspired lengthier running options.

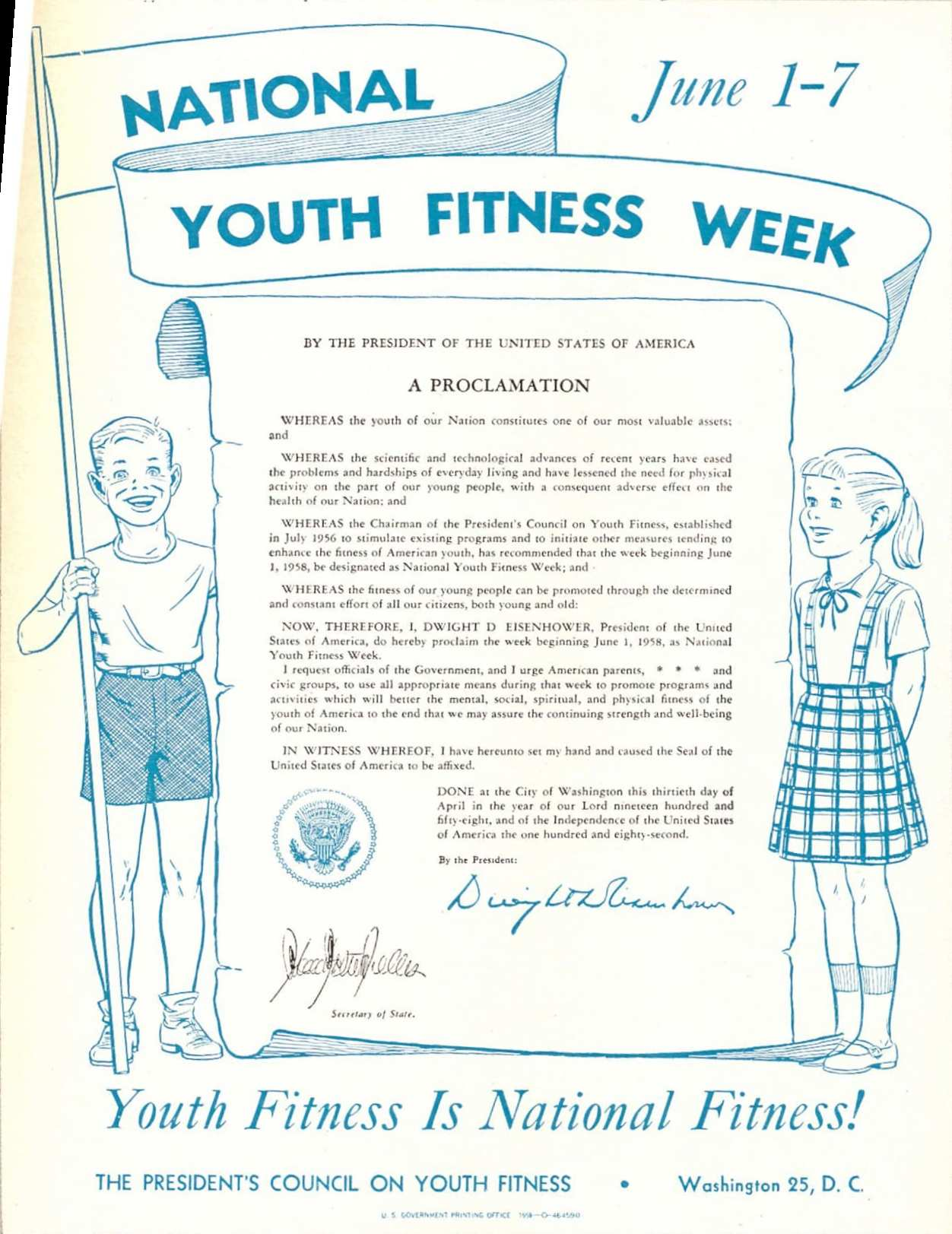
A Sports illustrated article from 1958 includes this image, which announces the implementation of the first annual fitness week. The accompanying article opens with, "There is a week for practically everything in the American way of life, including doughnuts, but Youth Fitness Week has a special meaning to all Americans. For one thing, it reflects the personal concern felt by President Eisenhower about a vital national problem. The naming of this week is his fourth official act in behalf of fitness since he called a White House lunch three years ago to discuss the implications of the shocking report that American children physically lagged far behind their European contemporaries."

The Presidential Fitness Test remained widely implemented, and the Award program was expanded to include sports through the Carter and Reagan administrations. The focus remained on the exceptional performance of individual children, celebrating those who performed at the top of their classes.

=== Retirement of the test (Clinton to Obama) ===
Bill Clinton's presidency marked a turn for the Presidential Council on Sports, Fitness, and Nutrition, first promoting materials that engaged all children, not just those who rose to the top of their specific fitness tests. In partnership with the Sporting Goods Manufacturers Association (SGMA), International Health, Racquet, and Sportsclub Association (IHRSA), and the Advertising Council, Clinton's Council developed three-year advertising campaigns focused on youth fitness titled "Get Off It!" and "Get Up, Get Out!".

George W. Bush's Council continued this trend of engaging even the lowest-performing children. In 2003, Chairman Lynn Swann spoke to the National Press Club about the council's programs and emphasized the Presidential Active Lifestyle Award with goals of helping Americans and American children in particular to "Be Physically Active Every Day". These awards focused on the continuous practice of fitness rather than the singular exceptional performance. While the Presidential Fitness Test and Award System remained present in school systems, the expansion of evaluating health and wellness practices contributed to the trend away from the test.

Ultimately, the Obama presidency retired the Presidential Fitness Test. First Lady Michelle Obama dedicated much of her writing to children's fitness and nutrition. Launching "Let's Move!" in 2010, the First Lady stated her goal of "solving the challenge of childhood obesity within a generation so that children born today will reach adulthood at a healthy weight." The program included working out to music by Beyoncé, an emphasis on nutrition, and a focus on providing support to communities and schools with the least number of resources. This individualized approach to bolstering individual health continued to replace the Cold War hope of individual exceptionalism.

On September 10, 2012, the President's Council launched the Presidential Youth Fitness Program, presented as a comprehensive school-based program that combined science and technology to promote the health and physical fitness of all of America's youth. The Program was created through a private-public partnership between the President's Council on Sports, Fitness, and Nutrition, the Centers for Disease Control and Prevention, the National Fitness Foundation, the Society of Health and Physical Educators, and The Cooper Institute. This signaled the retirement of the Presidential Fitness Test. The Presidential Youth Fitness Program utilizes a new form of calculations, placing students within ranges and removing the Award for achieving the highest category. Instead, students are provided with individual assessments and goals, along with a structured approach to achieving them. In place of the Presidential Fitness Test, the program emphasizes individual progress over exceptionalism.

=== Interim programs and revival under Trump ===
Since the termination of the Presidential Fitness Test during Obama's presidency, programs like Michelle Obama's "Let's Move!" increased the number of programming promoting childhood fitness. The National Football League's "Play 60" campaign is one prominent example. In partnership with the American Heart Association, GoNoodle, and the Cooper Institute, the program developed a playbook for engaging in fitness-related activities at home. Since it was launched in 2007, the League has donated more than $352K toward programming, grants, and awareness campaigns. Similarly, corporations like Disney and McDonalds have developed programming focused on advertising the importance of fitness for children. No longer about the singular child's excellence, the shift in focus toward getting all children to be active has created an opportunity for corporations to fund programming to a broad audience.

President Donald Trump signed an executive order in 2025 to reinstate the test. The Guardian noted a contrast with Trump's earlier philosophy that exercise is "misguided" because it depletes a person's lifetime supply of energy. While promoting the test in 2026, Trump estimated that he exercised "about one minute a day, max, if I'm lucky".

== Composition ==
The form of the test varied from year to year, but at the time of its discontinuation in 2012 comprised:

- running one mile;
- performing as many sit-ups as possible in 60 seconds;
- performing pull-ups or push-ups until failure (the choice of exercise being left to the proctor);
- a sitting flexibility test; and
- a variant shuttle run.

The purpose of running was to gauge cardiovascular health, sit-ups to gauge core strength, and the shuttle run to gauge agility. Exercise professionals have criticized the inclusion of the sit-up on the grounds that it can injure the back and only partially engages the core.

== Impact on children ==
=== Physical health impacts ===
While the stated goal of the Presidential Fitness Test was focused on bettering the health of America's youth, some critiques of the test have brought to light the misalignment between the promises and the results. Specifically, the Presidential Youth Fitness Program focused its energy on shifting ideas away from the measurements of athletic performance and turning toward health-related fitness. The Fitness Test was designed to capture the best performance at core strength, aerobic capacity, upper-body strength, speed and agility, and flexibility. However, the program did not provide physical education teachers with the structure to improve the performance of the children in their classes. The shift toward the Fitness Program is an attempt to capture the health-related fitness level of children, providing educators with the ability to improve specific areas of health.

=== Mental health and body image ===
The Presidential Fitness Test and physical education have been seen by Trump as the solution for the rise in childhood obesity because it promotes more physical activity within school. However, many recall the Presidential Fitness Test as an exercise in public humiliation. A student who was interviewed for a study on fatphobia in physical education and attended school in the 1970s and 1980s stated that "I think [physical education] was just to let kids have healthier bodies... but I think even back then there was this fatphobic attitude. I think a large part of it was trying to eradicate the fatness of kids." The other students that were interviewed for this study came to the consensus that they "recalled feelings of alienation, dread, and disembodiment." They also recalled that during gym class, oftentimes they felt "humiliated, vulnerable, or incompetent".

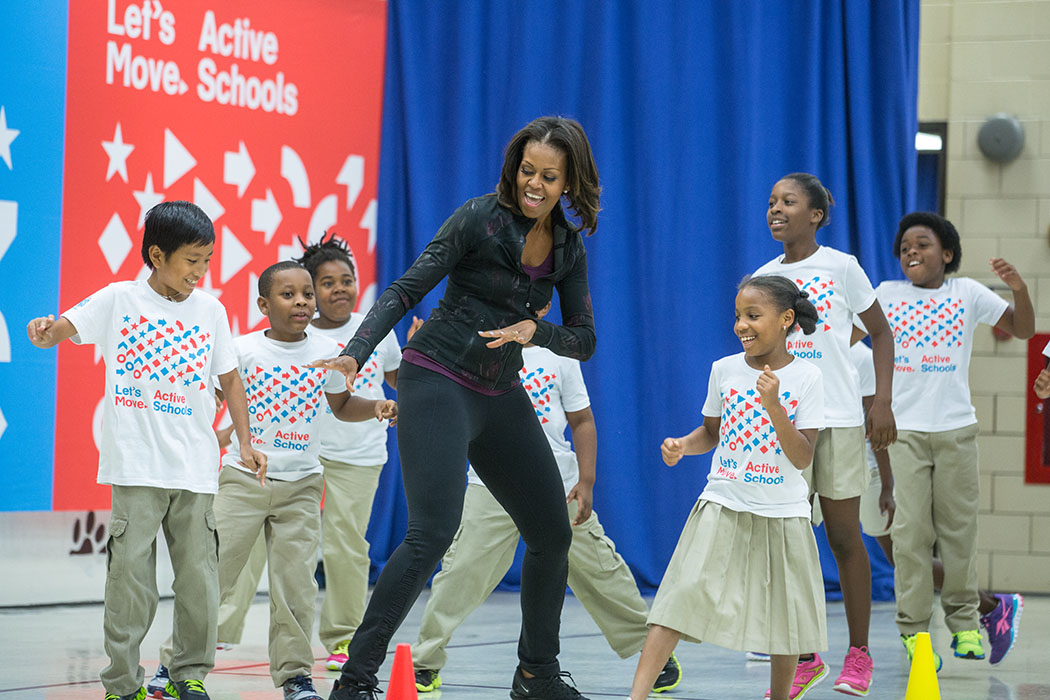
Michelle Obama exercising with children

Studies on programs such as Texas Fitness Now revealed that physical education in the United States is correlated with a rise in disciplinary issues in children and absences from school. This study concludes that physical programs allow for the harassment of children who do not measure up to the physical fitness standards, contributing to truancy. A number of physical education teachers interviewed by the New York Times estimated that the test has a negative impact on student attitudes toward physical activity.

=== Effects on definitions of childhood ===
The Presidential Fitness Test began with the narrative that America had gone soft and needed to "toughen up" to prepare for a potential war. Since then, this narrative took on new forms under different presidents. After the September 11 attacks, childhood obesity entered the public forum as a question of the "terror within" America, and the seeds of destruction of society. Many researchers believe that the driving force underneath the physical education programs of the United States have consisted of the drive to create the "perfect soldier". Studies were done on how this narrative created a childhood that is focused only on creating the perfect soldier for times of threat. There is a consensus among researchers from these studies that this level of fear in citizens created a culture of health tracking that relies on "greater surveillance and restriction of individual bodies." Teachers have argued that this approach to physical education created unhealthy relationships with exercise and activity. Physical educators involved in the Texas Fitness program claimed it failed because it did not take a holistic approach to children's health. It focused too much on attaining skills instead of exercising for the sake of exercise, and these teachers emphasized that "research shows that people can get a good workout even when walking, and the more important thing is to create a healthy relationship with exercise that can last for decades."
