= Bonnie Prudden =

American physical fitness pioneer, rock climber and mountaineer (1914–2011)

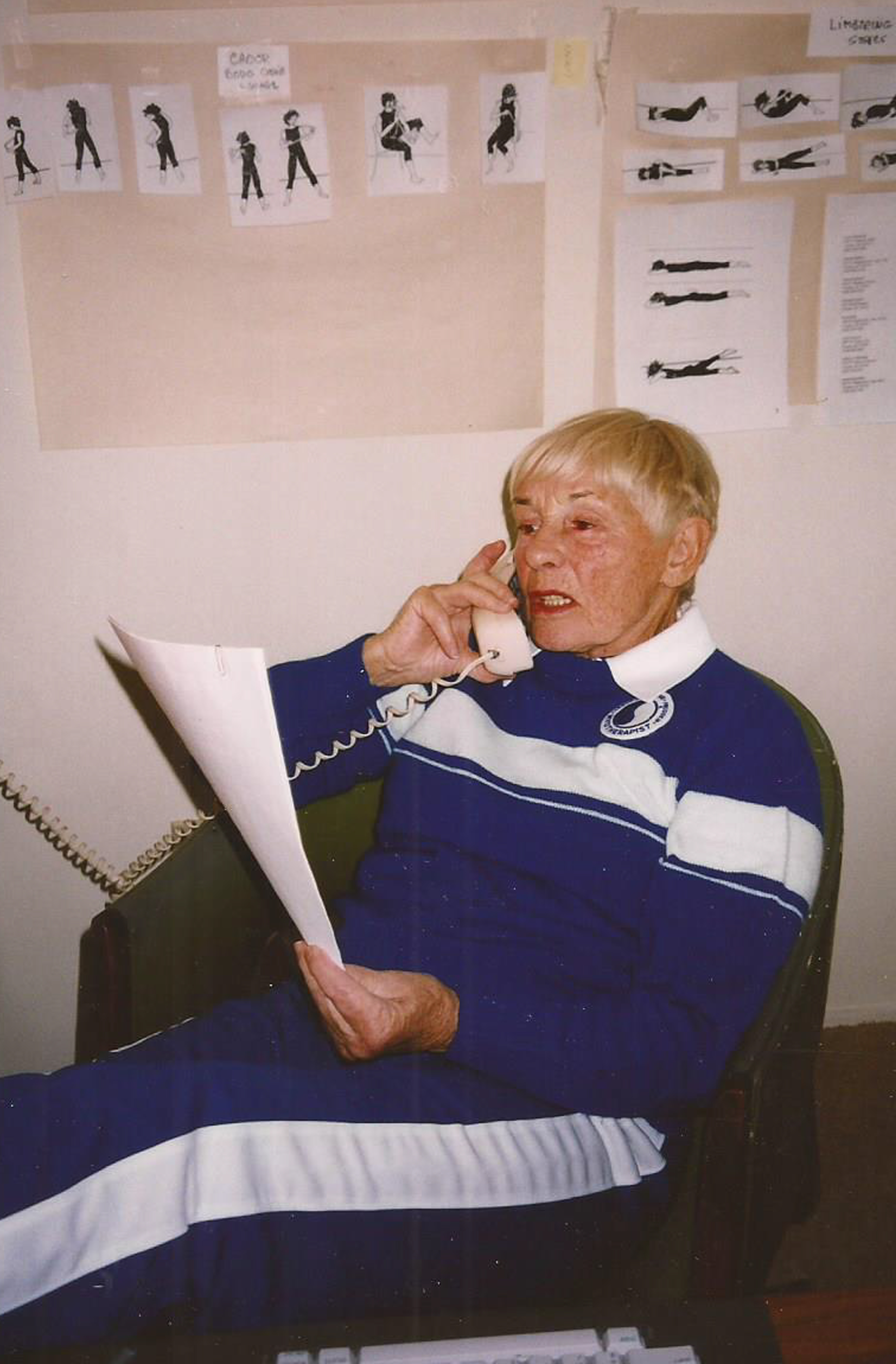
- Prudden recording an exercise album (1996)
- Born: Ruth Alice Prudden; January 29, 1914; New York City, U.S.
- Died: Tucson, Arizona, U.S. December 11, 2011 (aged 97)
- Occupation: Physical fitness pioneer
- Known for: Myotherapy, The Bonnie Prudden Show

Bonnie Prudden (née Ruth Alice Prudden; January 29, 1914 – December 11, 2011) was an American physical fitness pioneer, rock climber and mountaineer. Her report to Eisenhower on the unfitness of American children as compared with their European counterparts led to the formation of the President's Council on Youth Fitness.

Prudden authored 16 books on physical fitness and myotherapy for all ages and abilities including two best sellers, How to Keep Slender and Fit After Thirty (1961) and Pain Erasure: The Bonnie Prudden Way (1980). She produced six exercise albums, hosted the first regular exercise spots on national television, had a syndicated television show, and wrote a regular column for Sports Illustrated.

Schools, prisons, summer camps, factories, hospitals, clubs, YMCAs, universities, geriatric homes and facilities for the physically and emotionally challenged all used and benefited from the many physical fitness programs she provided for them. Prudden also designed the first fitness fashions and developed numerous pieces of exercise equipment that could be built in the average garage and used by the family.

She also coined the term and developed the practice of myotherapy in 1976, described as, "A method of relaxing muscle spasm, improving circulation, and alleviating pain. Pressure is applied, using elbows, knuckles, or fingers, and held for several seconds to defuse 'trigger points.' The success of this method depends upon the use of specific corrective exercises of the freed muscles."

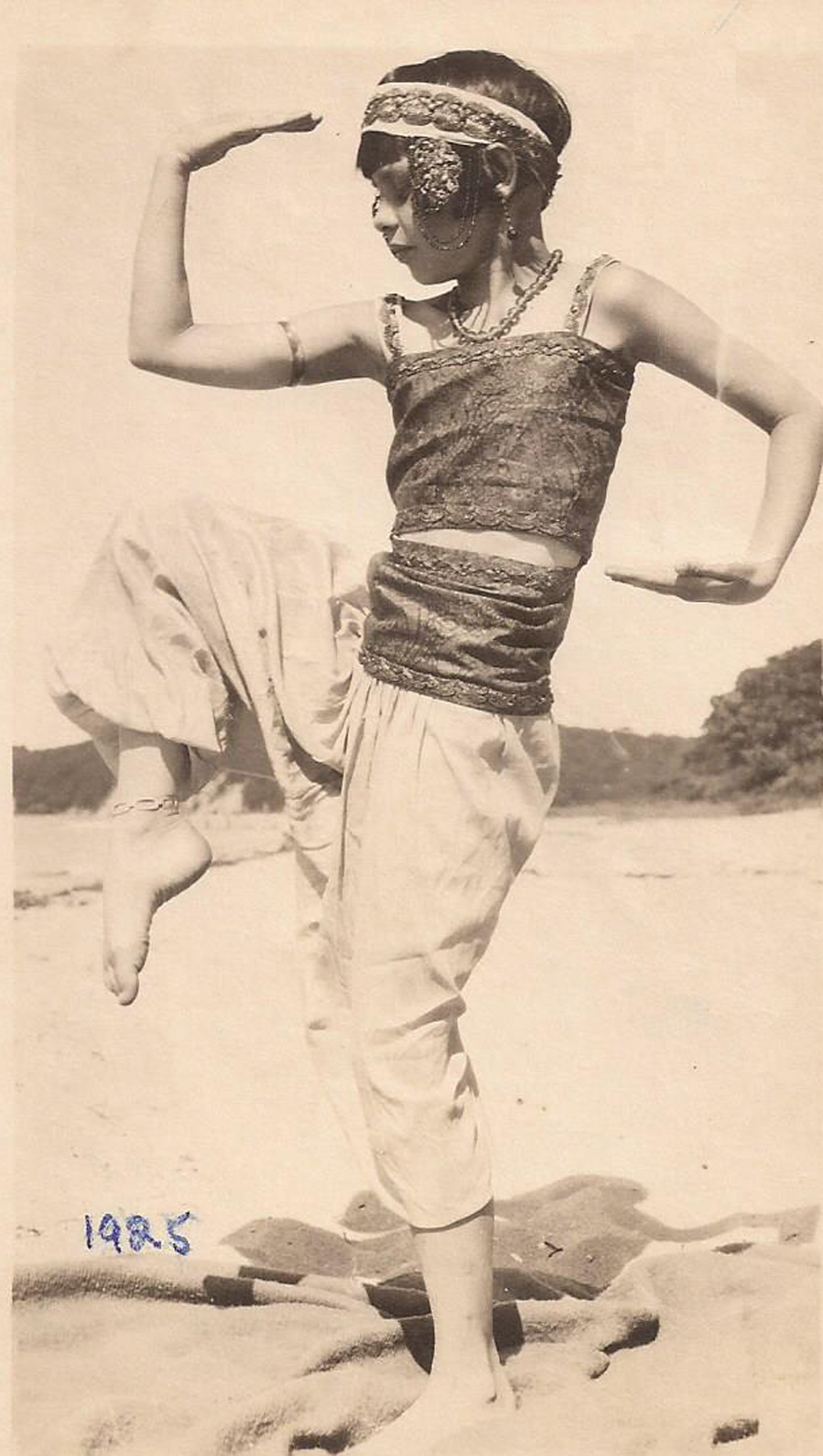
Bonnie Prudden, eleven years old, 1925

== Early life ==
Born Ruth Alice in New York City, Prudden began her climbing and dance career at age four when she ventured out the second story nursery window of her Mt. Vernon home to go night walking. After three such escapades a doctor told her mother, "There is nothing wrong with this child that discipline and exhaustion won't cure. Put her in the Russian Ballet School."

During her growing up years she trained in the Koslov, Magna and Alviene Schools of dance, drama, elocution and gymnastics. She attended German Turnverein gymnastic clubs and Finnish exercise, took piano, violin, voice, riding, and writing lessons and studied anatomy.

In 1931 she was enrolled at Horace Mann School where she excelled in English, art, sports, music, and drama, and taught dance to her classmates. After graduating in 1933 she took extension courses in art at the Grand Central School of Design and journalism and psychology courses at Columbia University. At the same time she began studying modern dance with Charles Weidman and Doris Humphrey and became part of the Weidman/Humphrey concert/theatrical dance group performing on Broadway.

== Mountaineering ==
In 1936, she married Richard Hirschland, a mountaineer and skier. Their honeymoon in Switzerland was marked by a climb on the Matterhorn following one day of training and the purchase of a new pair of boots.

She first climbed in the Gunks of New York in 1936 with her husband, along with Fritz Wiessner and Hans Kraus. In the winter of 1937, however, she badly fractured her pelvis in a skiing accident, which was followed by three months in traction and a doctors' prediction that she would always limp and would no longer be able to ski, climb, dance, or be able to have children. Nevertheless, daughter Joan Ellen was born in May, 1939 and Susan Ann in August, 1943. She rehabilitated herself with chair exercise and aqua-exercise to music. Prudden went on to become the first woman to hold a National Ski Patrol Badge and formed the Addlepate Ski Club, the first dry ski club in the country. It was for children eight to eighteen and became the basis for the first Jr. Ski Patrols. For more than a decade, she taught children ages eight to eighteen without incurring even one fracture. For her work, she was awarded the Eastern Amateur Ski Association award for ski safety.

Seven years after her injury, Prudden returned to the Gunks, partnering with good friend Hans Kraus. From 1946 to 1955 (mentored by Hans Kraus) she became one of the most prominent female climbers of the time with a documented 30 first ascents in the Shawangunks Mountains. In 1952, Prudden and Kraus attempted a new climbing route on the cliff known as the Trapps. After attempting the crux overhang, Kraus backed off, handing the lead to Prudden. She was able to find a piton placement that had eluded Hans at the crux, and went on to claim the first ascent of "Bonnie's Roof". Since then, she stated that she and Kraus always climbed as equal partners, always swapping leads. She stopped climbing in 1959 as she said she was working fourteen-hour days and no longer had weekends off.

After the Hirschlands divorced in 1954, she changed her name legally to Bonnie Prudden. She never remarried.

== Youth fitness ==
After watching her daughter's gym class in 1947, she started "Bonnie Hirschland's Conditioning Classes" for her two daughters and ten neighborhood children.

In a matter of weeks the class size had grown to 75. The schools offered their gyms for classes as long as she accepted all applicants. In 1949, new students entered her classes. To gauge the effectiveness of her program she borrowed and applied to practical use a fitness test devised by Kraus and Sonja Weber of New York Presbyterian Hospital. The Kraus–Weber test involves six simple movements and takes 90 seconds to administer. To her surprise, 58% of the new students failed the test, while only 8% of the students who had been in the program failed. For the next seven years Prudden and her volunteers tested 4,458 children between the ages of 6 and 16 in the United States. The failure rate was 56.6%. While climbing in Europe, Prudden and Kraus arranged to test children in Europe. In Italy, Austria and Switzerland, the children tested exhibited an 8% failure rate, averaged over the three countries.

In 1952, Bonnie (still known as Ruth Hirschland) and Kraus began writing papers for medical and physical education journals concerning their findings (e.g., "Role of Inactivity in Production of Disease—Hypokinetic Disease"), and various media outlets began to pick up the story.

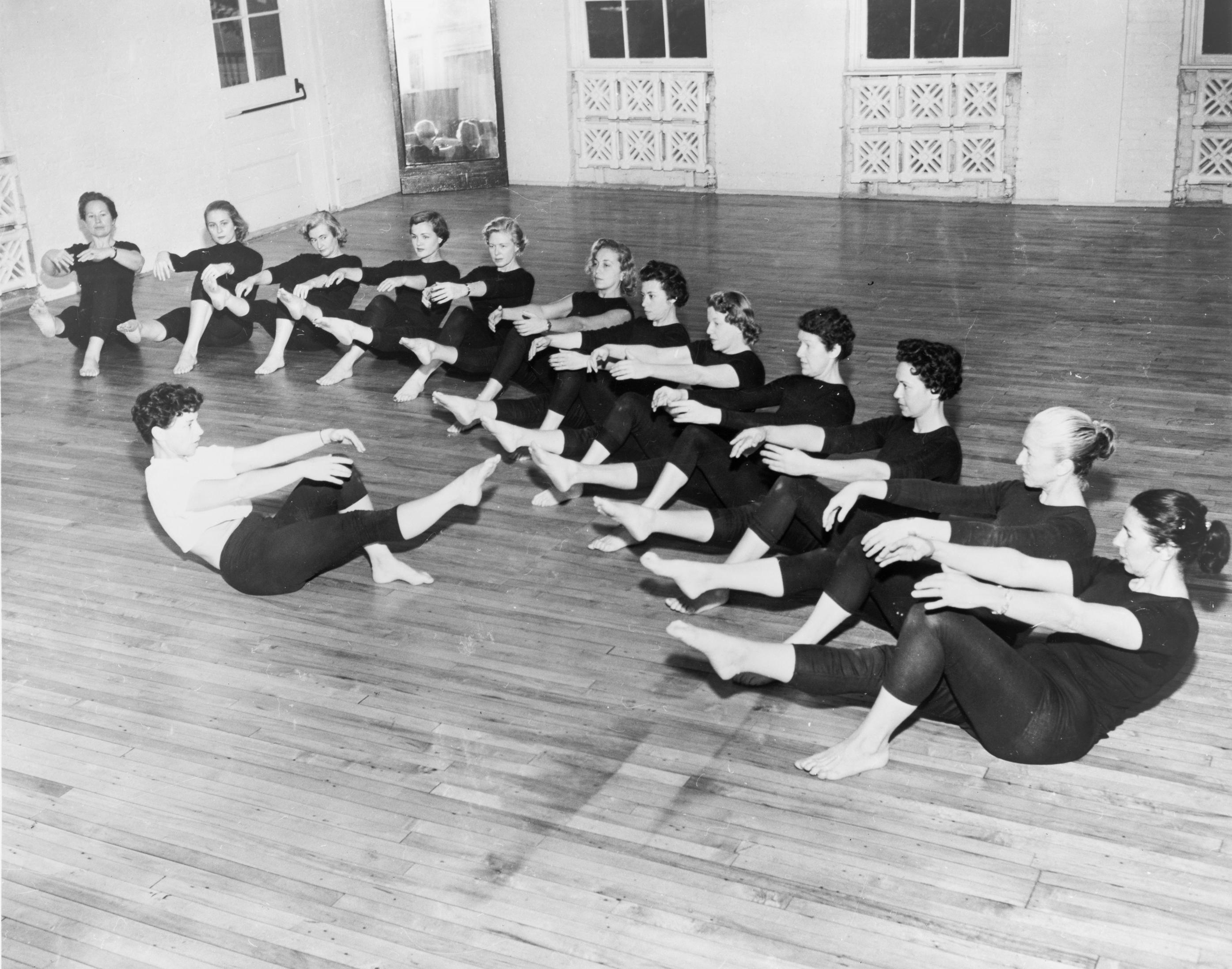
Bonnie Prudden leads a class in exercises at her White Plains school

Prudden bought an empty elementary school in White Plains, NY in 1954 and after renovating it opened The Institute for Physical Fitness. It housed three gyms, two dance studios, a Finnish sauna, a medical unit, two massage rooms, lockers, showers and an office. Taking classes barefoot was a requirement. Equipment, painted in bright colors, was designed after curbs, boulders, fences, railroad tracks, and walls of a less mechanized day. Chinning bars were built in every doorway. Every child used the 42 stairs between basement and top floor for conditioning, discipline and special muscle building. Outside was an obstacle course that included America's first climbing wall, cargo nets, hurdles, parallel bars, ladders, ramps, balance maze, tightrope, slalom poles and a rappel roof.

In 1955, armed with statistics and a personal invitation to the Eisenhower White House, Bonnie Prudden and Hans Kraus presented their findings on the fitness level of American public school children compared to that of their peers in Italy, Austria, and Switzerland. This became known as "The Report that Shocked the President" or the "Shape of the Nation" and was the beginning of a change in American attitudes toward physical fitness.

Kraus's presentation followed with the medical implications of insufficient physical activity, including elevated risks of obesity, back pain, high blood pressure, diabetes, coronary heart disease, psychiatric problems and muscle tension. Following this, President Eisenhower issued an executive order establishing the President's Council on Youth Fitness (now the President's Council on Physical Fitness, Sports and Nutrition). Prudden served on the advisory committee for three years.

Prudden and Kraus are credited as co-founders of the council. In 2007, Prudden was awarded the council's Inaugural Lifetime Achievement Award. The YMCA decided to adopt Prudden's methods of teaching exercise and follow her advice to admit women to their buildings for morning classes. Representatives were sent to Prudden's White Plains Institute to be taught Kraus–Weber testing and exercise teaching. They went back to their respective states and set up the Prudden Program in their YMCAs. Prudden became a much sought after speaker, and the YMCAs became the place to go for the Prudden Programs, with "diaper gym and swims", pre-natal classes, and toddler-, mixed teen- and family-oriented classes. Is Your Child Really Fit? was published in 1956. It enlarged on the President's report and outlined the solution to the problem.

From 1957 through 1960 Prudden served as a columnist for Sports Illustrated, introducing her fitness program and appearing on the cover in a full-length leotard of her own design. Fitness fashions were born. Attracted by the fitness fashions, The Home Show with Arlene Frances and Hugh Downs booked her for a weekly family fitness TV spot. Following the end of The Home Show, she moved to the Today Show with Dave Garroway, where she remained for two and a half years. She left the show when they started advertising a diet pill in connection with her spot and watchers thought she was endorsing it. At the same time she had regular spots on two radio shows, Tex and Jinx McCrary and Arthur Godfrey. From 1955 through 1975 Prudden continued her crusade for better bodies. She wrote 13 books, countless manuals, set up pilot programs, designed fitness clothing and equipment for home and school, lectured nonstop throughout the country, made six records, two films, and one film strip, established five-day training workshops, and wrote and taped 35 half-hour segments of The Bonnie Prudden Show. These last were so successful that she was contracted for 165 more segments. In 1962 Reader's Digest began underwriting the Prudden Program. This partnership lasted through the mid-1980s.

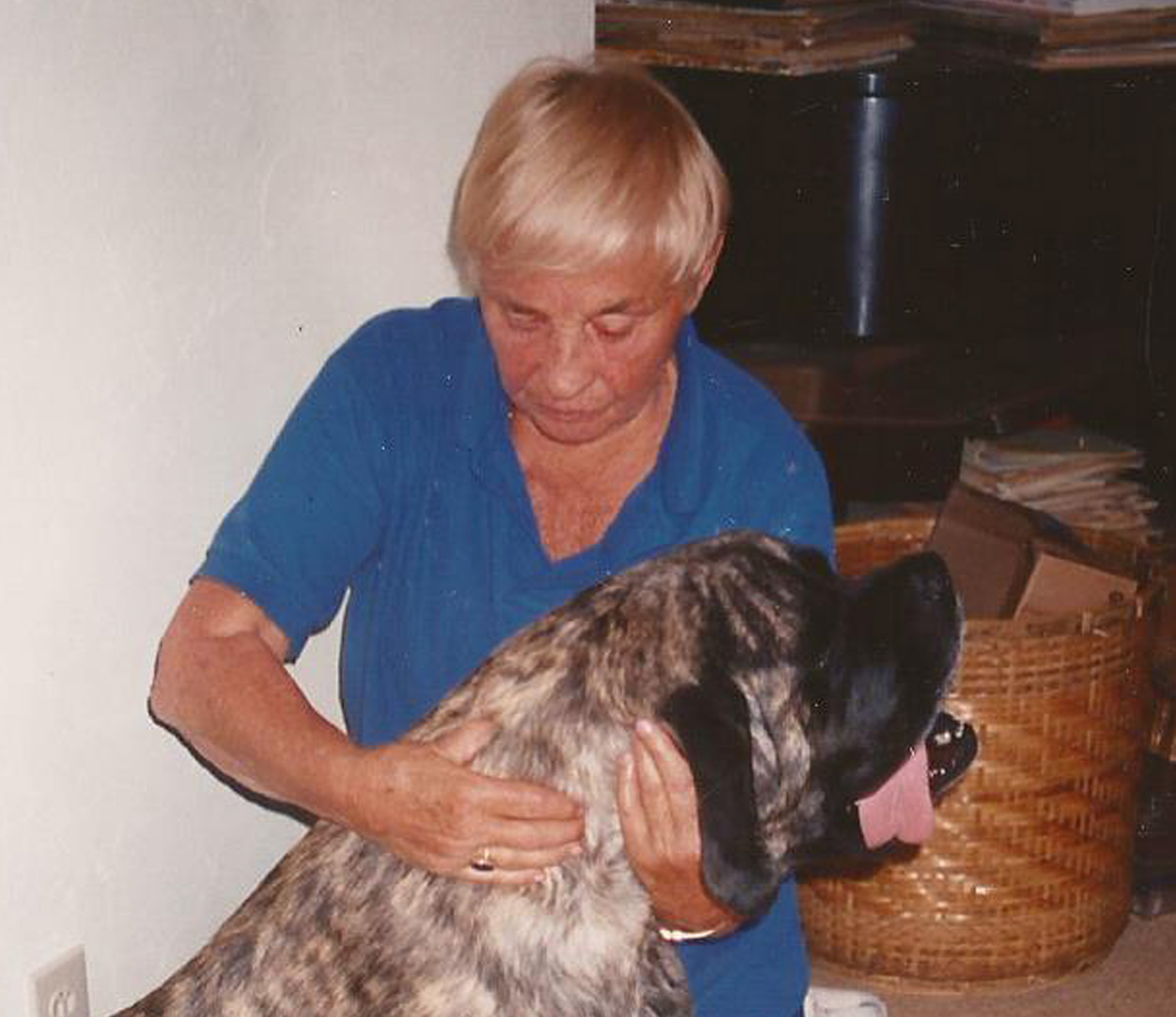
Bonnie Prudden using Bonnie Prudden Myotherapy on her English Mastiff "Blue". Tucson, Arizona, 1994.

== Later life ==
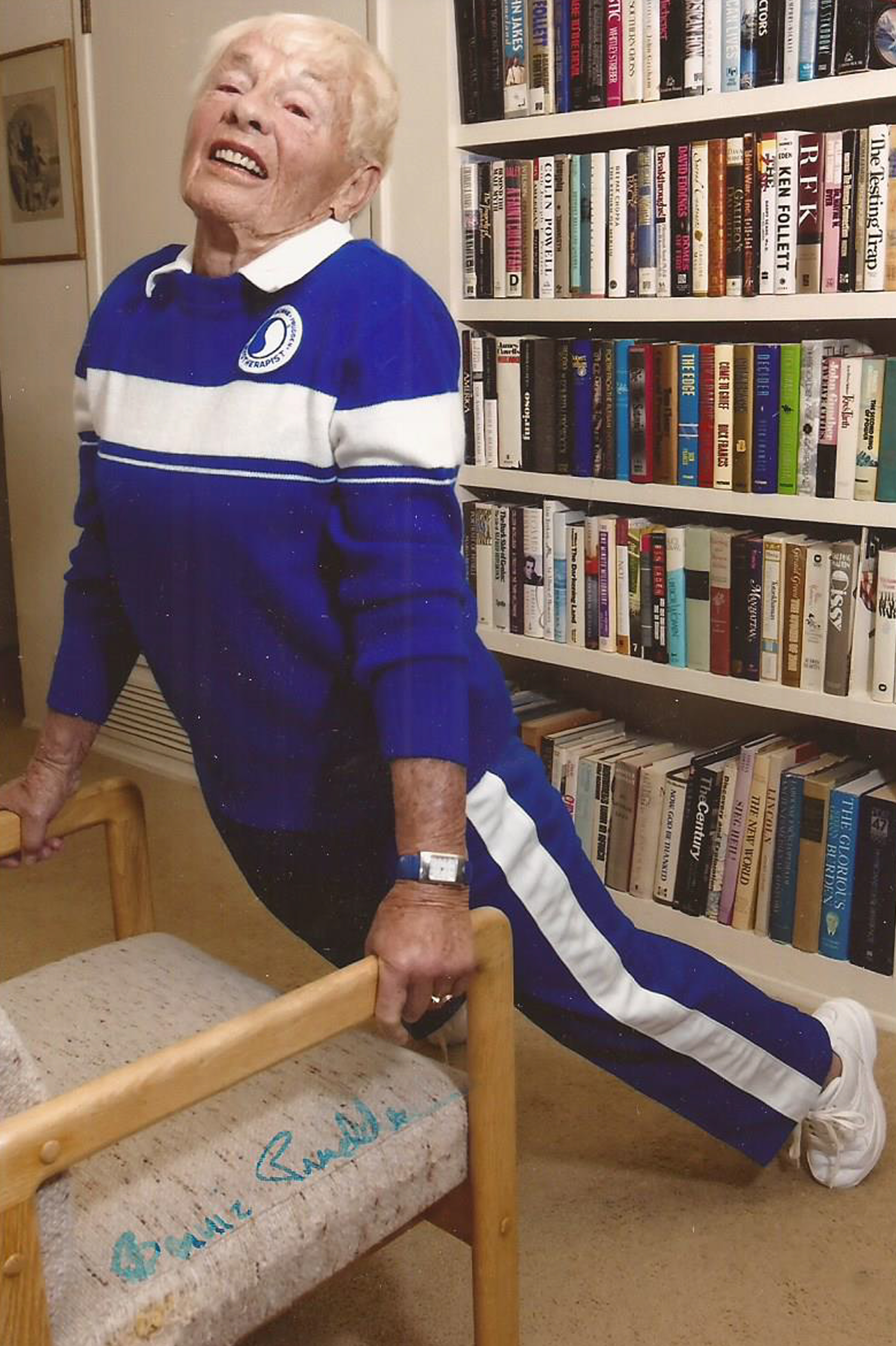
Bonnie Prudden, Tucson, Arizona, January 30, 2006

Here's a description of her later life from the Bonnie Prudden Myotherapy website:

In 1992, Bonnie moved her work and business to Tucson, Arizona, where she ran the Bonnie Prudden School for Physical Fitness and Myotherapy and Bonnie Prudden Myotherapy Inc. Refusing to retire, she continued her fight for more fit and pain-free bodies. For the next eighteen years she continued to teach people of all ages how to take responsibility for their own bodies and to erase muscle related pain for themselves, their friends, family, and pets. She continued to write, lecture and travel, teach at her school, see patients, and conduct exercise classes and pain erasure seminars, serve on boards and garner national and local awards. Despite a pelvis broken in four places in a skiing accident, heart attacks, reconstructive hip surgery on her left hip, stents, by-pass surgery (age 92) she continued to use each seemingly adverse situation to learn and teach.

"You can't run back the clock," Prudden said, "but you can rewind it."

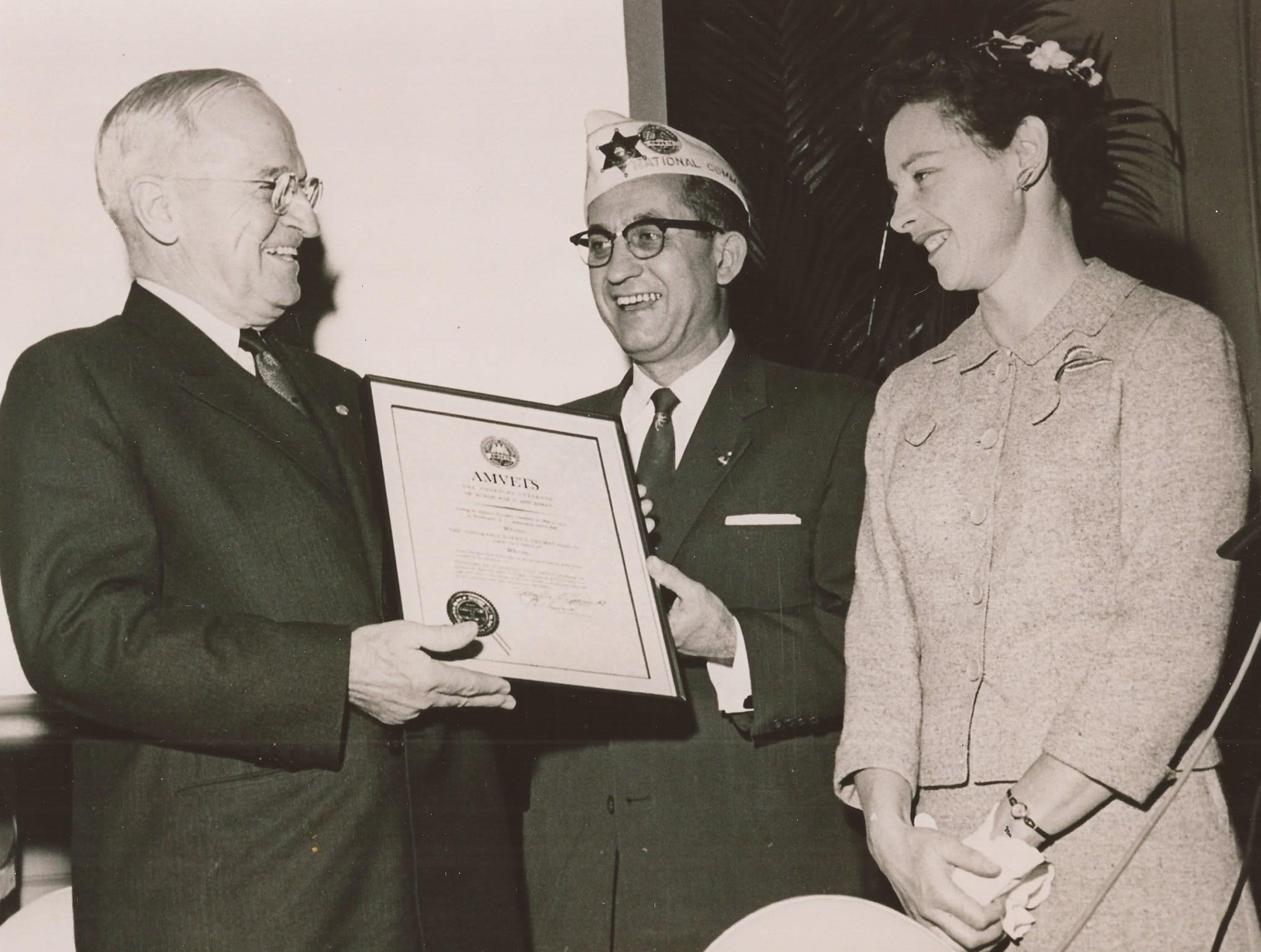
From left to right, President Harry Truman, Winston E. Burdine, National Commander of AMVETS, Bonnie Prudden, Institute of Physical Fitness, 1958–1959

== Bonnie Prudden equipment ==
- Outdoor obstacle course: First such course included first climbing wall in the country along with a rappel roof. Other equipment included cargo nets, balance track, large and small hurdles, rope climb, tires, ramps, Weaveit, balance ladder, slalom poles, balance maze, tightrope, parallel bars.
- Build-it-yourself playground: balance track, double trapeze, balance maze, fixed ropes, hurdles, stationary parallel bars, movable parallel bars, tires, ramps.
- Large equipment: sawhorses, jumping ramps, balance beams, ladders with instructions on how to build.
- Bonnie Prudden's Underwater Slalom Course: designed by Bonnie Prudden. Produced by Argo Industries Corporation, Jackson Heights, NY.
- Prudden/Porter Gymster: A children's portable gym for use in schools, houses, churches. Designed by Bonnie Prudden. Produced by Porter Gym Equipment, 1963. Shown in their products brochure 1964. Instructional booklet written by Bonnie Prudden.
- Doorway gyms
- Bonnie Prudden Myotherapy aids: pulley, Bodos, Shepherd's crook.
- Small equipment: Exer-Weights, Exer-Wands, Exer-Rug squares, blocks, Exer-straps, Exer-paddles, Disk-o-tek, Surfer, small parallel bars.

== Last years & death ==
In an interview in 1997, Prudden said, "Every once in a while I have a conversation with God. I say I'm tired. This work is just too hard. Can I retire? The answer is always no. The reason is that whatever I have in here", she says, pointing to her head, "to give about the importance of fitness, must be given until I can't give anymore."

Prudden died in 2011. A eulogy for her in the Arizona Daily Star reads, "Despite suffering a bone-crushing accident, joint replacements, cancer and heart bypass surgery, the international fitness pioneer, TV personality and adviser to presidents remained healthy and active for all of her 97 years. She was still exercising from her hospice bed, just days before her death, December 11, six weeks shy of her 98th birthday." Prudden died in Tucson, Arizona.

== Television ==
- The Bonnie Prudden Show (1963) – 35 half hour daily shows on exercise consisting of three segments, Mail Bag, Exercise and Interview. They were filmed in Canada, Australia and Singapore. They were syndicated in Canada and the United States.
- The Bonnie Prudden Show (1965) – 165 half hour daily shows. Syndicated in Canada, Australia and Singapore.
- The Flabby American (May, 1957) – ABC, 30 minute special.
- Grape-Nuts cereal commercial (1950s)

== Film ==
- Keep Fit Be Happy (1971)
- Your Baby Can Swim (1974)
- Alive and Feeling Great (1974) – Girls Clubs of America

== DVDs ==
- Bonnie Prudden Myotherepy: How to Get Started
- Bonnie Prudden Myotherapy: Quick RX for Headaches
- Bonnie Prudden Myotherapy: Quick RX for Back Pain

These were produced in 1985 by Bonnie Prudden Inc. (videographer: Donald Hamilton) on VHS and converted to DVD in 1991.

== Discography ==
- Keep Fit | Be Happy (1959)
- Keep Fit | Be Happy 2 (1962)
- Fitness for Baby and You (1962)
- Fit to Ski (1965)
- Fitness for Teens (1965)
- Executive Fitness (1966)

== Books ==
- Basic Exercises, Number I, self-published (1949)
- Is Your Child Really Fit?, Harper & Row, the first book on children's fitness (1956)
- Bonnie Prudden's Fitness Book, Ronald Press (1959)
- How to Keep Slender and Fit after Thirty, Geiss Associates, a first in women's fitness; a best seller (1961)
- Testing and Training for Physical Fitness, David G. Smith Printing-publishing, NB Canada (1962)
- How to Keep Your Child Fit From Birth to Six, Harper & Row, a trilogy emphasizing physical, mental, and emotional fitness (1964)
- Quick RX For Fitness, Dutton (1965)
- Teenage Fitness, Harper & Row.(1965)
- Physical Fitness for You, a talking book for the blind available through the Library of Congress (1965)
- How to Keep Slender and Fit after Thirty revised, Pocket books, a division of Simon & Schuster (1969)
- Fitness from Six to Twelve, Harper & Row (1972)
- Your Baby Can Swim, Reader's Digest Press (1974)
- How to Keep Your Family Fit and Healthy, Reader's Digest Press, distributed by E.P. Dutton & Co., Inc. (1975)
- Exer-sex, Bantam Books (1978)
- Dollar Fallax (The Elusive Pain), self-published (1978)
- Pain Erasure: The Bonnie Prudden Way, M. Evans, hardcover NY Times best seller (1980)
- Pain Erasure: The Bonnie Prudden Way, Ballantine Books, softcover (1982)
- Your Baby Can Swim, reissued as Teach Your Baby to Swim, Dial Press (1982)
- How to Keep Your Child Fit from Birth to Six, Harper & Row, (1964)
- How to Keep Your Child Fit from Birth to Six, reissued by Dial Press (1982)
- Fitness from Six to Twelve, reissued by Dial Press (1982)
- Teenage Fitness, reissued by Dial Press (1982)
- Myotherapy: Bonnie Prudden's Complete Guide to Pain-free Living, Dial Press, hardcover (1984)
- Myotherapy: Bonnie Prudden's Complete Guide to Pain-free Living, Ballantine Books, softcover (1985)
- Bonnie Prudden's After Fifty Fitness Guide, Villard Books (1986)
- Bonnie Prudden's After Fifty Fitness Guide, Ballantine Books, soft cover.(1987)
- Bonnie Prudden's After Fifty Fitness Guide. reprinted by Bonnie Prudden Myotherapy, Inc. (2011)
- How to Keep Your Child Fit from Birth to Six, Ballantine Books, revised and updated with a chapter on Myotherapy (1986)
- Bonnie Prudden's After Fifty Fitness Guide, Ballantine Books, softcover (1987)
- Fitness from Six to Twelve, Ballantine Books, revised and updated with a chapter on Myotherapy (1987)
- Teenage Fitness, Ballantine Books, revised and up-dated with a chapter on Myotherapy (1988)
- Myotherapy: Bonnie Prudden's Complete Guide to Pain-Free Living, reprinted by Bonnie Prudden Myotherapy, Inc. (2010)
- Exer-sex, reprinted by Bonnie Prudden Myotherapy, Inc. (2011)
