= The Bonnie Prudden Show =

- Genre: Talk show
- Starring: Bonnie Prudden
- Country of origin: Canada
- Original language: English
- No. of seasons: 2
- No. of episodes: 195

Production
- Production company: Crescendo Productions

Original release
- Network: CBC Television
- Release: 15 November 1965 – 11 June 1968

The Bonnie Prudden Show is a Canadian talk show and exercise television program that aired on CBC Television from 1965 to 1970.

== Premise ==
Fitness expert Bonnie Prudden combined interview and exercise segments during this series. Subjects included aging, astrology, finance, health and travel. Her guests were from internationally and culturally diverse backgrounds.

Some episodes, especially in the 1967–68 season, were produced on location in such regions as Asia and Australia.

Episodes were produced in Toronto by Crescendo Productions and Taylor-Roffman Productions Ltd. and broadcast by CBC Television and in US syndication.

== Scheduling ==
This half-hour series was broadcast on CBC weekdays at 4:00 p.m. in its first season for 65 episodes from 15 November 1965 to 15 February 1966. After skipping new production for 1966–67, other than some limited morning rebroadcasts in early 1967, its final season of 130 programmes in 1967-68 was broadcast from 30 October 1967 to 11 June 1968.

Repeats were broadcast on CBC Television until September 1970.
