= Clinton Davisson =

American physicist (1881–1958)

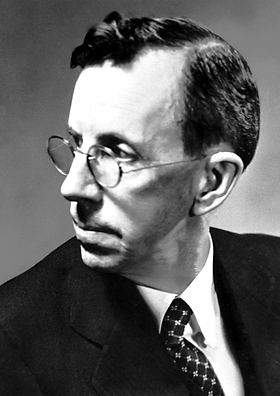
- Davisson in 1937
- Born: Clinton Joseph Davisson; October 22, 1881; Bloomington, Illinois, U.S.
- Died: February 1, 1958 (aged 76); Charlottesville, Virginia, U.S.
- Education: University of Chicago (BS); Princeton University (PhD)
- Known for: Davisson–Germer experiment
- Spouse: Charlotte Sara Richardson (m. 1911)
- Children: 4, including Richard
- Awards: Comstock Prize in Physics (1928); Elliott Cresson Medal (1931); Hughes Medal (1935); Nobel Prize in Physics (1937)
- Scientific career
- Fields: Physics
- Workplaces: Carnegie Institute of Technology; Western Electric; Bell Labs
- Doctoral advisor: Owen Richardson
- Other academic advisors: Robert Millikan

Clinton Joseph Davisson (October 22, 1881 – February 1, 1958) was an American experimental physicist who shared the 1937 Nobel Prize in Physics with George Paget Thomson "for their experimental discovery of the diffraction of electrons by crystals."

== Biography ==
Clinton Joseph Davisson was born on October 22, 1881, in Bloomington, Illinois, the son of Mary (née Calvert) and Joseph Davisson. His father was an artisan from Ohio, while his mother was a schoolteacher from Pennsylvania; they were of Dutch–French and English–Scotch descent, respectively.

Davisson graduated from Bloomington High School in 1902, and entered the University of Chicago on scholarship. Upon the recommendation of Robert Millikan, he was hired by Princeton University in 1905 as an instructor in physics. He completed the requirements for a Bachelor of Science from Chicago in 1908, mainly by working in the summers. While teaching at Princeton, he did doctoral research under Owen Richardson, gaining a Doctor of Philosophy in 1911 for a thesis titled On The Thermal Emission of Positive Ions From Alkaline Earth Salts.

After graduating, Davisson became an instructor in the Department of Physics at the Carnegie Institute of Technology (now Carnegie Mellon University). In 1917, when the U.S. entered World War I, he took up war-related research in the Engineering Department of the Western Electric Company. Davisson continued to work at Western Electric until 1925, when he joined the Technical Staff of the newly-founded Bell Telephone Laboratories. He retired from Bell Labs in 1946. The following year, he accepted a visiting professorship at the University of Virginia.

Davisson died on February 1, 1958, in Charlottesville, Virginia, at the age of 76.

== Davisson–Germer experiment ==
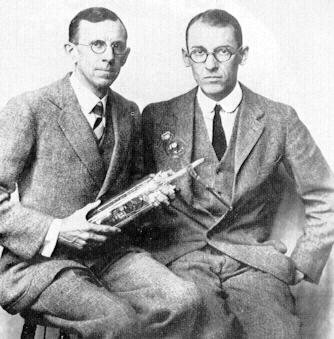
Davisson (left) and Lester Germer, 1927

Diffraction is a characteristic effect when a wave is incident upon an aperture or a grating, and is closely associated with the meaning of wave motion itself. In the 19th century, diffraction was well-established for light and for ripples on the surfaces of fluids.

In 1927, Davisson and his Bell Labs colleague, Lester Germer, performed an experiment showing that electrons were diffracted at the surface of a crystal of nickel. This work confirmed the de Broglie hypothesis that particles of matter have a wave-like nature, which is a central tenet of quantum mechanics. In particular, their observation of diffraction allowed the first measurement of a wavelength for electrons. The measured wavelength $\lambda$ agreed well with de Broglie's equation $\lambda = h/p$, where $h$ is the Planck constant and $p$ is the electron's momentum.

== Family ==
While doing his graduate work at Princeton, Davisson met his future wife, Charlotte Sara Richardson, who was visiting her brother (and his doctoral advisor), Professor Owen Richardson. Charlotte was the sister-in-law of Oswald Veblen, a prominent mathematician. Clinton and Charlotte (d. 1984) married in 1911 and had four children: Owen; James; Richard, who became a physicist; and Elizabeth.

== Recognition ==
=== Awards ===
Year	Organization	Award	Citation	Ref.
1928	National Academy of Sciences	Comstock Prize in Physics	"In recognition of his experimental work demonstrating that under certain conditions, electrons behave as we would expect trains of waves to behave."	
1931	Franklin Institute	Elliott Cresson Medal	"For the scattering and diffraction of electrons by crystals."	
1935	Royal Society	Hughes Medal	"For his research that resulted in the discovery of the physical existence of electron waves through long-continued investigations on the reflection of electrons from the crystal planes of nickel and other metals."	
1937	Royal Swedish Academy of Sciences	Nobel Prize in Physics	"For their [Davisson and George Paget Thomson] experimental discovery of the diffraction of electrons by crystals."	

=== Memberships ===
Year	Organization	Type	Ref.
1929	American Philosophical Society	Member	
1929	American Academy of Arts and Sciences	Member	
1929	National Academy of Sciences	Member	

== Commemoration ==
Davisson, a crater on the far side of the Moon, was named after him in 1970.
