= Kraus–Weber test =

Physical fitness test

The Kraus–Weber test (or K–W test) is a fitness test devised in the 1940s by Hans Kraus and Sonja Weber of New York Presbyterian Hospital. The poor tests results of American children versus children from European countries gained attention in the 1950s from American media, prompting the United States government to establish the Presidential Fitness Test within the following decades.

== Description of test ==
The Kraus–Weber test has six simple exercises and takes 90 seconds to administer.

1. A simple sit-up with knees bent and feet planted
2. A sit-up with legs extended and not bent
3. Raising feet while lying on the back
4. Raising head, chest and shoulders off the ground while lying on the stomach
5. Raising legs off the ground while lying on the stomach
6. With knees straight, bending forward to touch the floor

== Test history ==
Some early studies using the Kraus–Weber test were performed by Bonnie Prudden. In 1940s and 1950s, she applied this test to students in her conditioning classes. To her surprise the new students failed the test at 58% while the students who had been in the program failed at only 8%. Over a period of seven years, Prudden and her volunteers tested 4,458 children between the ages of 6 and 16 in the United States. The failure rate was 56.6%. While climbing in Europe, Prudden and Kraus arranged to test children in Europe. In Italy, Austria and Switzerland, the children tested exhibited an eight percent failure rate.

In 1952, Prudden and Kraus began writing papers for medical and physical education journals on Hypokinetic Disease: Role of Inactivity in Production of Disease. At this point, popular media outlets began to cover the findings.

In 1955, armed with statistics and a personal invitation to the Dwight Eisenhower White House, Prudden presented her findings on the fitness level of American public school children compared to that of their peers in Europe. The media labeled it The Report that Shocked the President and the Shape of the Nation.
