= Walter M. Elsasser =

German-American physicist (1904–1991)

Walter Maurice Elsasser
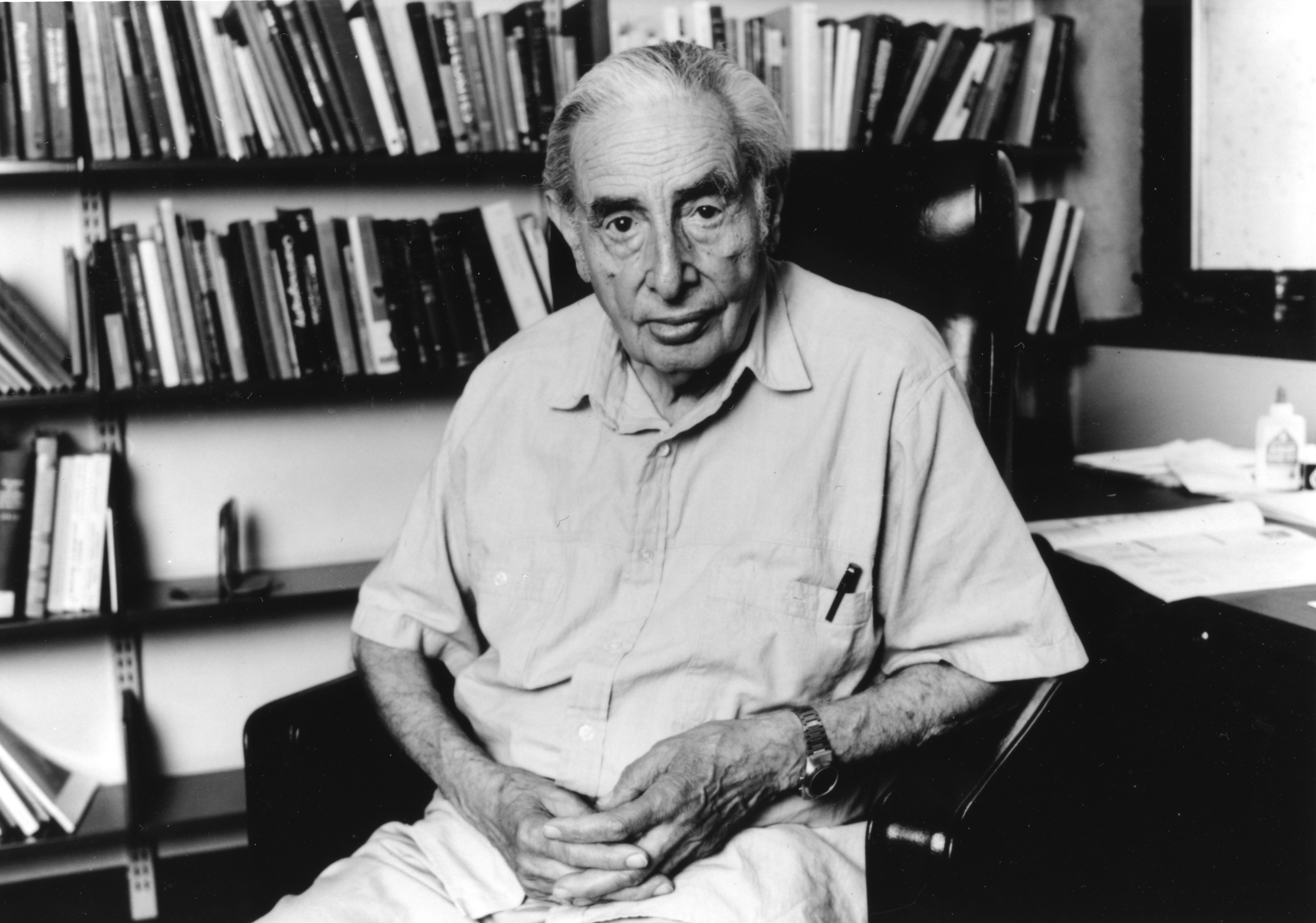
- Born: 20 March 1904; Mannheim, Germany
- Died: 14 October 1991 (aged 87); Baltimore, United States
- Known for: Dynamo theory Complex system biology
- Awards: National Medal of Science (1987); William Bowie Medal (1959); Arthur L. Day Medal (1979)
- Scientific career
- Fields: Physics; Theoretical biology
- Doctoral advisor: Max Born

Walter Maurice Elsasser (March 20, 1904 – October 14, 1991) was a German-born American physicist who developed the presently accepted dynamo theory to explain Earth's magnetic field. He proposed that this field results from electric currents induced in the fluid outer core. He demonstrated that the history of Earth's magnetic field is revealed by the magnetic orientation of minerals in rocks. He is also noted for his unpublished proposal that the diffraction of electrons sent through a crystal would demonstrate their wavelike nature. The subsequent Davisson–Germer experiment showing this effect led to a Nobel Prize in Physics.

Between 1962 and 1968 he was a Professor of Geophysics at Princeton University. Between 1975 and 1991 he was an adjunct Professor of Geophysics at Johns Hopkins University The Olin Hall at the Johns Hopkins University has a Walter Elsasser Memorial in the lobby.

== Biography ==
Elsasser was born in 1904 to a Jewish family in Mannheim, Germany. As a physics student in Göttingen during the 1920s, well before his geodynamo theory, he suggested an experiment to test the wave aspect of electrons. Though the experiment was tried in England and failed, his suggestion was later communicated by his professor at Göttingen, Nobel Prize recipient Max Born, to a physicist at Bell Labs in the United States. The Davisson-Germer and Thomson experiments verified electron diffraction and eventually netted a Nobel Prize in Physics. In 1935, while working in Paris, Elsasser calculated the binding energies of protons and neutrons in heavy radioactive nuclei. Eugene Wigner, J. Hans D. Jensen and Maria Goeppert-Mayer received the Nobel in 1963 for work developing out of Elsasser's initial formulation. Elsasser therefore came quite close to a Nobel prize on two occasions.

During 1946–47, Elsasser published papers describing the first mathematical model for the origin of the Earth's magnetic field. He conjectured that it could be a self-sustaining dynamo, powered by convection in the liquid outer core, and described a possible feedback mechanism between flows having two different geometries, toroidal and poloidal (indeed, inventing the terms). This had been developed from about 1941 onwards, partly in his spare time during his scientific war service with the U.S. Army Signal Corps.

During his later years, Elsasser became interested in what is now called systems biology and contributed a series of articles to Journal of Theoretical Biology. The final version of his thoughts on this subject can be found in his book Reflections on a Theory of Organisms, published in 1987 and again posthumously with a new foreword by Harry Rubin in 1998.

Elsasser died in 1991 in Baltimore, Maryland, US.

== Biotonic laws ==
A biotonic law, a phrase invented by Elsasser, is a principle of nature which is not contained in the principles of physics.

Biotonic laws may also be considered as local instances of global organismic or organismal principles, such as the Organismic Principle of Natural Selection.

Some, but not all, of Elsasser's theoretical biology work is still quite controversial, and in fact may disagree with several of the basic tenets of current systems biology that he may have helped to develop. Basic to Elsasser's biological thought is the notion of the great complexity of the cell. Elsasser deduced from this that any investigation of a causative chain of events in a biological system will reach a "terminal point" where the number of possible inputs into the chain will overwhelm the capacity of the scientist to make predictions, even with the most powerful computers. This might seem like a counsel of despair, but in fact Elsasser was not suggesting the abandonment of biology as a worthwhile research topic but rather for a different kind of biology such that molecular causal chains are no longer the main focus of study. Correlation between supra-molecular events would become the main data source. Moreover, the heterogeneity of logical classes encompassed by all biological organisms without exception is an important part of Elsasser's legacy to both Complex systems biology and Relational Biology.

Given that an analysis of the organism on the basis of classical mechanics fails in the face of "unfathomable complexity," Elsasser made use of his familiarity with quantum mechanics to arrive at a viable approach. With reference to Niels Bohr's framework of complementarity, he noted that an exact specification of the "particle" aspect of a quantum system precludes a description of the system in its "wave" aspect. By generalizing complementarity to include any system that involves irreducible individuality, Bohr extended his framework to include organisms. Elsasser argued that generalized complementarity in biology would mean that the overall understanding of the organism is incompatible with a complete analysis of its physico-chemical properties. Biology, he wrote, must "restrain its preoccupation with too many empirical details in favor of some holistic understanding."

Elsasser reasoned that the failure of deterministic physico-chemical processes to explain biological order necessitates "creative selection" on the part of the organism. Since many possible patterns of internal activity conform with physical law, the organism must select one pattern above all others. The central question is then the criterion by which the organism makes its selection. Elsasser's answer was "holistic memory." Non-deterministic internal activity "results from a selection, among the immense numbers of patterns available, of a pattern that resembles some earlier pattern of the same organism or of preceding (parental) organisms." Alongside the hereditary information stored in genes, which constitutes a "mechanistic" form of memory, life exhibits holistic memory on the basis of a "primary phenomenon of nature": the conservation of information. Just as physical processes reveal the conservation of mass, momentum and energy, "the conservative property of organisms is their similarity to preceding states without intermediate information storage."

Elsasser dismissed vitalism, which he defined as laws that apply solely to matter that constitutes complex systems such as organisms. Though evident only in the context of biology, the conservation of information is nevertheless a general feature of nature and therefore biotonic, not vitalist.

== Publications ==
- Heat Transfer by Infrared Radiation in the Atmosphere. Harvard University. 1942. OCLC 10892935.
- The Physical Foundation of Biology. An Analytical Study. London: Pergamon Press. 1958.
- Atom and Organism. A New Approach to Theoretical Biology. Princeton University Press. 1966.
- The Chief Abstractions of Biology. Amsterdam: North Holland. 1975.
- Memoirs of a Physicist in the Atomic Age. New York: Science History Publications. 1978. ISBN 9780882021782. OCLC 3415166.
- "The role of individuality in biological theory". Towards a Theoretical Biology vol.3. Edinburgh University Press. 1970.
- Reflections on a Theory of Organisms. Holism in Biology. Johns Hopkins University Press. 1998.

== Awards ==
Elsasser was elected to the National Academy of Sciences in 1957. From the American Geophysical Union he received the William Bowie Medal, its highest honor, in 1959; and the John Adam Fleming Medal (for contributions to geomagnetism) in 1971. He received the Penrose Medal from the Geological Society of America in 1979 and the Gauss Medal from Germany in 1977. In 1987, he was awarded the USA's National Medal of Science "for his fundamental and lasting contributions to physics, meteorology, and geophysics in establishing quantum mechanics, atmospheric radiation transfer, planetary magnetism and plate tectonics."

== See also ==
- Complex system biology
- List of geophysicists
- Mathematical and theoretical biology
