= Richard Davidson (disambiguation) =

Richard Davidson (born 1951) is a professor of psychology and psychiatry.

Richard Davidson may also refer to:

- Richard K. Davidson (1942–2026), American railway executive
- Richard M. Davidson (theologian), Old Testament scholar and Seventh-day Adventist
- Richard M. Davidson (actor), Canadian-American actor
- Richard Davidson, a character in A Soldier's Play
- Richard Davison, racing driver in 1984 Australian Grand Prix
- Richard Davidson, speedway rider in New Zealand Solo Championship

== See also ==
- Richard Davison (disambiguation)
- Richard Davisson (1922–2004), American physicist
