= Lester Germer =

American physicist (1896–1971)

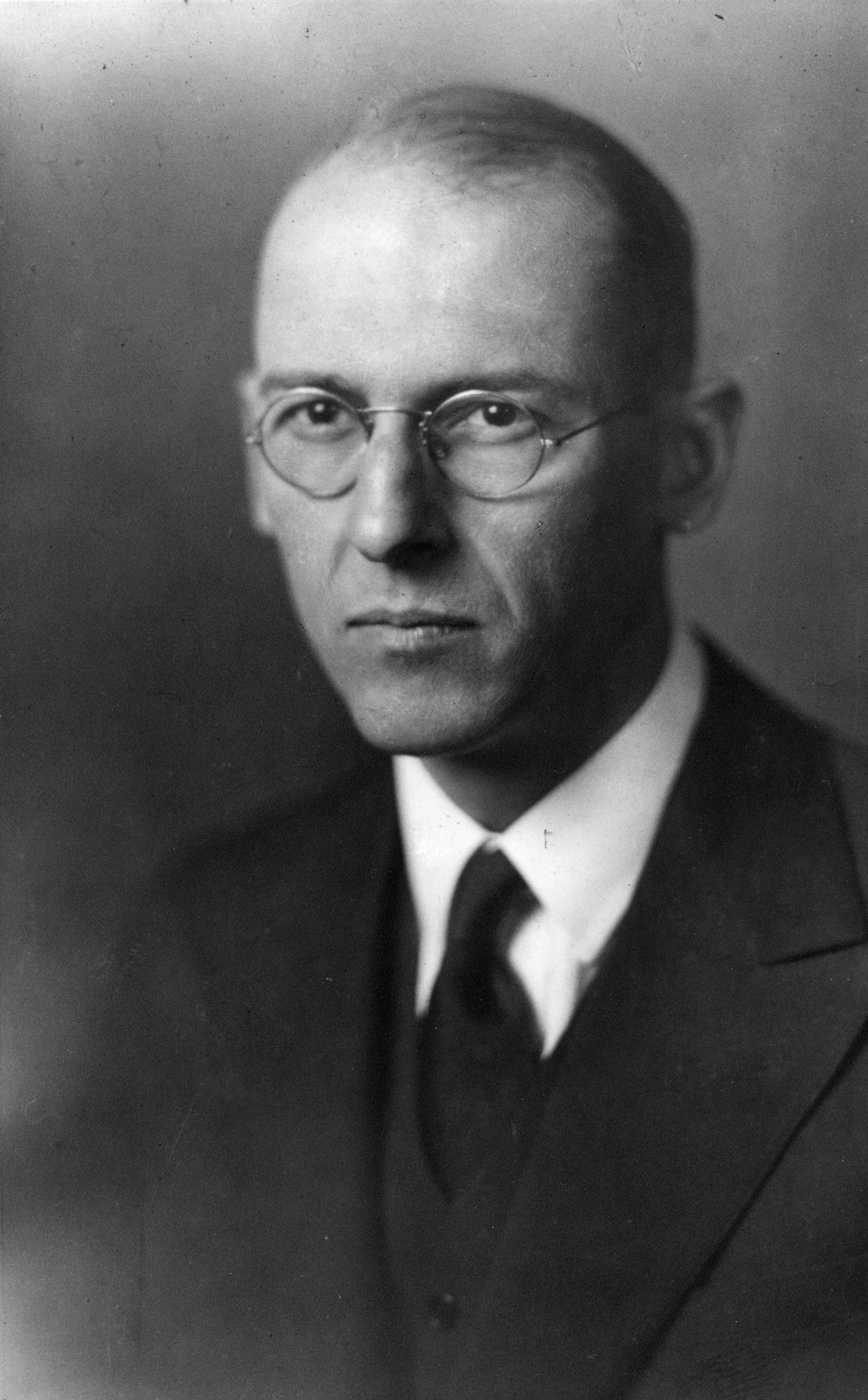
- Born: October 10, 1896; Chicago, Illinois, US
- Died: October 3, 1971 (aged 74); Shawangunk Ridge, New York, US
- Education: Cornell University
- Known for: Davisson-Germer experiment
- Awards: Elliott Cresson Medal (1931)
- Scientific career
- Fields: Physics
- Doctoral advisor: Clinton Davisson

Lester Halbert Germer (October 10, 1896 – October 3, 1971) was an American physicist. With Clinton Davisson, he proved the wave-particle duality of matter in the Davisson–Germer experiment, which was important to the development of the electron microscope. These studies supported the theoretical work of De Broglie. He also studied thermionics, erosion of metals, and contact physics. He was awarded the Elliott Cresson Medal in 1931.

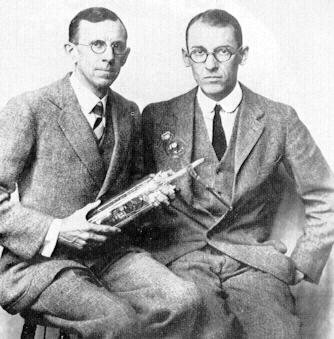
Lester Germer (right) with Clinton Joseph Davisson (left) 1927

A former fighter pilot in World War I, Germer started to work at Bell Labs in 1919, while the Labs was still part of Western Electric. He was a graduate student lab assistant at the time he worked on the famous experiment that would eventually bring the Nobel Prize to Davisson. (Despite being nominated for the Nobel Prize 26 times alongside Davisson, Germer did not share the award.) Later, he headed the Labs’ contact physics department, and developed equipment that allowed for the visual display of low-energy electron diffraction patterns on a fluorescent screen. He retired in early 1960s.

In 1945 (at the age of 49), Germer launched a side career as a rock climber. He climbed widely around the Northeast United States, and especially at New York's Shawangunk Ridge. Although the Appalachian Mountain Club was dominant in the area at the time, and strictly regulated rock climbing, Lester was never associated with the club, and found himself in conflict with the leading climber in the area, Hans Kraus, who was head of the AMC's Safety Committee. He was once turned down for climbing certification with the comment "Likes people too much and is too enthusiastic." Lester was known for being generous and friendly. He was once called "A one man climbing school."

In 1971, one week before his 75th birthday, Lester Germer died of a massive heart attack while lead climbing a rock climb at the Shawangunk Ridge (Double Chin, 5.6). Until that moment, Lester had a 26-year perfect safety record in rock climbing; he had never even taken a leader fall.
