= Myotherapy =

Massage and muscle therapy techniques

Myotherapy is a form of muscle therapy which focuses on the assessment, treatment and rehabilitation of musculoskeletal pain and associated pathologies. The term myotherapy was coined by Bonnie Prudden to describe a specific type of trigger point therapy which she developed in the 1970s based on the earlier work of Travell and Simons who researched the cause and treatment of pain arising from myofascial trigger points. While based on rational principles, there is little scientific research regarding the efficacy of this therapy, so it remains controversial within the medical and academic disciplines.

Over the ensuing 40 years, myotherapy has evolved to become an allied health discipline which is practised in many countries across the world including the UK, Australia, USA, Canada, Malaysia, and Thailand.

== Effectiveness ==
In 2015 the Australian Government's Department of Health published the results of a review of alternative therapies that sought to determine if any were suitable for being covered by health insurance; "Massage therapy or myotherapy" was one of 17 therapies evaluated for which no clear evidence of effectiveness was found. The report found that the overall quality of the trial was poor, although highlighted that there was moderate quality evidence of success with certain patients. The report concluded that "the effectiveness of massage therapy within this population remains uncertain. No studies were identified that assessed the effect of myotherapy in people with a clinical condition, and the effectiveness of this therapy is therefore unknown."
