= Hans Kraus =

Austrian physician

Hans Kraus (November 28, 1905 in Austria-Hungary – March 6, 1996, in New York City) was a physician, physical therapist, mountaineer, and alpinist. A pioneer of modern rock climbing, he was also one of the fathers of sports medicine and physical medicine and rehabilitation and was elected to the U.S. National Ski Hall of Fame in 1974.

== Career ==
Born in the Austro-Hungarian Empire, Kraus attended medical school in Vienna in the 1920s, against his father's wishes, becoming an orthopedic surgeon. Through his subsequent practice, he developed a philosophy of treatment at odds with traditional medicine of the time. He would evolve this method, called "immediate mobilization," over his entire medical career. Passing his medical exams in New York, Kraus continued developing unique methods of fracture treatment, applying them to all kinds of athletes. He became especially well known in skiing circles.

Kraus warned Americans that children were not getting enough exercise and were watching too much television. Along with Bonnie Prudden, he campaigned for better physical exercise programs for children, and authored several books on exercise, sports medicine, and physical therapy. Eisenhower championed Kraus and his campaign to get Americans to exercise. However, by 1957, it was clear that Kraus was unsuccessful. Kraus was broadly opposed by the AMA and gym teachers (who felt Kraus was disparaging to their leadership) and many Americans, as Sports Illustrated reported in 1957, who worried that mandatory exercise programs for children would "Hitlerize American youth."

Kraus also continued to develop a unique approach to treating back pain in collaboration with another doctor, Sonja Weber. They developed an understanding of the underlying causes of back pain and devised the Kraus–Weber test (also called K–W test) and exercises to alleviate it.

Kraus was an associate professor at the State University of New York Downstate Medical Center College of Medicine. His studies on children led to President Dwight D. Eisenhower establishing the President's Council on Physical Fitness and Sports. In October 1961, Kraus became President Kennedy's secret White House back doctor.

The story of Kennedy's back had never prior been reported, although there was much speculation; but Kraus and Kennedy's two other White House doctors had sworn confidentiality.

In April 2006, over ten years after Kraus's death, Kraus's widow donated Kraus's White House medical records on Kennedy to the Kennedy Library. Kraus's medical records purported to show that by the time of Kennedy's death in Dallas, Kraus's therapy had nearly cured Kennedy of his lifelong back pain.

Kraus's White House medical records also contain several entries about Kennedy's back corset, which he had worn since Harvard. Kraus recorded that he had grown convinced that the corset was impeding Kennedy's recovery and that Kennedy needed to permanently stop wearing it. In October 1963, Kennedy told Kraus that he would stop wearing his corset indefinitely starting in January 1964. Several leading presidential historians, including James Reston and Robert Dallek, theorized that Kennedy might have survived Dallas if he was not wearing the corset.

== Climbing ==
Among his friends and climbing partners were Emilio Comici and Gino Soldà. He would later bring the Dolomite techniques of high-angle face climbing to the United States

In 1940, he met Fritz Wiessner, who would become a lifelong friend and climbing partner. Wiessner had discovered the Shawangunks in 1935, and together Kraus and Wiessner spent every spare day developing routes in the area. Wiessner was known for his outstanding free climbing technique; Kraus's specialty was aid climbing. Thus, the two men's climbing skills complemented each other. While both men enjoyed climbing with women (notably with Bonnie Prudden, an accomplished climber in her own right), they continued to climb together, with often spectacular results. One of Kraus's and Wiessner's most significant efforts at the Gunks was High Exposure, a bold 5.6 that involves a blind reach around an overhung corner 150 feet up in the air; the route still confounds novice climbers. Done in 1941, with a hemp rope and three soft-iron pitons for protection, High Exposure was a world-class accomplishment. The route remains a rite of passage for aspiring rock climbers.

In November 1975, Kraus reclimbed the route – his favorite – to celebrate his 70th birthday. Other significant Kraus's first ascents in the Gunks included: Northern Pillar 5.2 (The first technical rock climb in The Trapps; Three Pines 5.3; Horseman 5.5; Madame Grunnebaum's Wulst 5.6; Easy Overhang 5.2; Bitchy Virgin 5.7R (the first "R" rated climb in the Shawangunks); and Emilio 5.7 (the first aid climb in the Gunks – Kraus and Wiessner employed a shoulder stand).

By the end of the 1940s, the Shawangunks had 58 documented climbing routes. Twenty-six of these were first ascents by Kraus; 23 were by Wiessner.

In the 1950s, Kraus was behind a push by the Appalachian Mountain Club to regulate climbing in the Shawangunks and to install a safety code to prevent climbing accidents. This safety code led to conflicts with Lester Germer and The Vulgarians, a raucous group of rock climbers led by Dick Williams, who occasionally climbed in the nude. Kraus's effort was later abandoned.

Kraus's U.S. climbing was not limited to the East Coast. He also scaled cliffs in the Wind River Range, the Teton Range, and the Bugaboos. In 1945, in the Wind Rivers, Kraus pioneered a new route on Mount Helen's Tower Ridge and lodged the first ascent of Skyline Peak and the first west-to-east traverse of the Triple Traverse. He also completed new routes on Mount Gannett's East Buttress, Mount Woodrow Wilson's South Face, and the Sphinx's South Ridge.

== Personal life ==
Kraus was born in what is now Trieste, Italy, which at the time was part of the 1867–1918 Austro-Hungarian Empire, he was taught English as a youth by James Joyce. In 1938, the Kraus family fled Europe, just ahead of World War II, this time to the United States. They settled in New York City. Kraus was not allowed to enlist in the U.S. military because he had been born in Trieste, which had belonged to the Habsburg Empire at the time of Kraus's birth. Therefore, he was technically considered an "enemy alien", even though he was a legal immigrant, and a Jew. He became a U.S. citizen in 1945.

Sometime in the late 1930s (precise date unknown; pre-1938), Kraus married Susanne Simon. The marriage was apparently not a happy one, and they separated in 1944 and were divorced in the 1950s. In 1959, Kraus remarried, to Madi Springer-Miller, a champion skier and the first woman to ski the "Lip" of Tuckerman's Ravine on Mount Washington. They had two daughters, Ann and Mary.

In 1984, at the age of 79, Kraus stopped climbing completely, due to arthritis, and the cumulative effects of various injuries. His last climb was Easy Overhang, a route he had done the first ascent of in 1941.

In 1995, Kraus was diagnosed with prostate cancer. He died peacefully on the morning of March 6, 1996, aged 90, in his New York City apartment, holding his daughter's hand. His ashes were carried up the High Exposure buttress by an old friend and scattered into the air at the top.

== List of works ==
Books

- Hypokinetic Disease: Diseases Caused by Lack of Exercise' (1965; with Wilhelm Raab)
- Backache, Stress, and Tension, Their Cause, Prevention, and Treatment (1965)
- The Cause, Prevention and Treatment of Backache (1969)
- Clinical Treatment of Back and Neck Pain (1970)
- The Causes, Prevention and Treatment of Sports Injuries (1981)
- The Sports Injury Handbook (1987)
- Diagnosis and Treatment of Muscle Pain (1988)
- Backache, Stress, and Tension: Understanding Why You Have Back Pain and Simple Exercises to Prevent and Treat It (2015; updated edition)
- Clinical Treatment of Back and Neck Pain (1970)

Journal publications

- Kraus H & Eisenmenger-Weber S (1945) Evaluation of posture based on structural and functional measurements, The Physiotherapy review 25:267–71. [Pubmed]
- Kraus H (1947) Therapeutic exercises in pediatrics, The Medical clinics of North America 31:626–35. [Pubmed]
- Kraus H & Eisenmenger-Weber S (1947) Fundamental considerations of posture exercises guided by qualitative and quantitative measurements and tests, The Physiotherapy review 27(6):361–8. [Pubmed]
- Kraus H (1949) Clinical pathophysiology of therapeutic exercises, New York state journal of medicine 49(3):294–6. [Pubmed]
- Kraus H (1949) The role of therapeutic exercises in the treatment of low back pain, New York state journal of medicine 49(13):1523. [Pubmed]
- Weber S & Kraus H (1949) Passive and active stretching of muscles; spring stretch and control group, The Physical therapy review 29(9):407–10. [Pubmed]
- Kraus H (1952) Diagnosis and treatment of low back pain, GP 5(4):55–60. [Pubmed]
- Kraus H & Hirschland RP (1954) Muscular fitness and orthopedic disability, New York state journal of medicine 54(2):212–5. [Pubmed]
- Kraus H, Hirschland BP, Hirschhorn K (1956) Role of inactivity in production of disease; hypokinetic disease, Journal of the American Geriatrics Society 4(5):463–71. [Pubmed]
- Hirschhorn K, Hirschland BP, Kraus H (1956) Hypokinetic disease; role of inactivity in production of disease, The British journal of physical medicine: including its application to industry 19(8):180–5. [Pubmed]
- Kraus H (1959) Prevention and treatment of ski injuries, Journal of the American Medical Association 169(13):1414–1419. [Pubmed]
- Kraus H, Nagler W, Weber S (1959) Role of exercise in the prevention of disease, GP 20:121–6. [Pubmed]
- Kraus H (1959) Evaluation and treatment of muscle function in athletic injury, American Journal of surgery 98:353–62. [Pubmed]
- Kraus H (1961) Prevention and treatment of skiing injuries, The Journal of Trauma 1:457–63. [Pubmed]
- Kraus H (1964) Pseudodisc—the problem of backache, Proceedings of the Rudolf Virchow Medical Society in the City of New York 23:50–9. [Pubmed]
- Kraus H (1965) Preventive value of physical fitness in the young, Southern Medical Journal 58(12):1561–1564. [Pubmed]
- Kraus H (1966) Muscle function of the temporomandibular joint, Dental clinics of North America 553–8. [Pubmed]
- Kraus H (1967) "Pseudo-disc", Southern Medical Journal 60(4):416–8.[Pubmed]
- Kraus H (1967) Prevention of low back pain, Journal of occupational medicine 9(11):555–9. [Pubmed]
- Kraus H & Kirsten R (1968) [Effect of swimming training on muscle metabolism], Monatsschrift fur Kinderheilkunde 116(6):313–5. [Pubmed]
- Kraus H, Kirsten R, Wolff JR (1969) [Effect of swimming and running exercise on the cellular function and structure of muscle], Pflügers Archiv: European Journal of physiology 308(1):57–79. [Pubmed]
- Kraus H & Kirsten R (1970) [Effect of physical training on mitochondrial energy production in heart muscle and liver], Pflügers Archiv: European Journal of physiology 320(4):334–47. [Pubmed]
- Kraus H & Kinne R (1970) [Regulation of the observed metabolic adaptation and performance increase by thyroid hormones during prolonged physical training], Pflügers Archiv: European Journal of physiology 321(4):332–45.[Pubmed]
- Farfan HF, Cossette JW, Robertson GH, Wells RV, Kraus H (1970) The effects of torsion on the lumbar intervertebral joints: the role of torsion in the production of disc degeneration, Journal of Bone and Joint Surgery 52(3):468–97. [Pubmed]
- Kraus H (1972) Evaluation of muscular and cardiovascular fitness, Preventive medicine 1(1):178–84. [Pubmed]
- Kraus H (1972) Reconditioning after knee injuries, New York state journal of medicine 72(8):941-5. [Pubmed]
- Kraus H (1973) Triggerpoints, New York state journal of medicine 73(11):1310–1314. [Pubmed]
- Lamy C, Bazergui A, Kraus H, Farfan HF (1975) The strength of the neural arch and the etiology of spondylolysis, The Orthopedic clinics of North America 6(1):215–31. [Pubmed]
- Kraus H (1975) The need for relaxation in athletics, The Journal of Sports Medicine 3(1):41–3. [Pubmed]
- Kraus H (1976) Effect of lordosis on the stress in the lumbar spine, Clinical Orthopaedics and Related Research (117): 56–8. [Pubmed]
- Kraus H, Melleby A, Gaston SR (1977) Back pain correction and prevention. National voluntary organizational approach, New York state journal of medicine 77(8):1335–1338. [Pubmed]
- Kraus H (1977) Research methods in the biomechanics of sports, The Orthopedic clinics of North America 8(3):549–62. [Pubmed]
- Afalonis A, Kraus H, Davis O, Neubauer RA, End E, George F, Furth FW, Davidson MR (1978) Letters, The Physician and sportsmedicine 6(2):9–17. [Pubmed]
- Nicholas JA, Sapega A, Kraus H, Webb JN (1978) Factors influencing manual muscle tests in physical therapy, Journal of Bone and Joint Surgery 60(2):186–90. [Pubmed]
- Kraus H (1978) Reconditioning aging muscles, Geriatrics 33(6):93–6. [Pubmed]
- Kraus H, Nagler W, Melleby A (1983) Evaluation of an exercise program for back pain, American Family Physician Journal 28(3):153–8. [Pubmed]
- Kraus H & Fischer AA (1991) Diagnosis and treatment of myofascial pain, Mount Sinai Journal of Medicine 58(3):235–9. [Pubmed]
- Marcus N, Kraus H, Rachlin E (1995) Comments on K.H. Njoo and E. Van der Does, PAIN 58(1994): 317–323. PAIN 61(1):159. [Pubmed]
- Kraus H & Marcus NJ (1997) The reintroduction of an exercise program to directly treat low back pain of muscular origin, Journal of Back and Musculoskeletal Rehabilitation 8(2): 95–107. [Pubmed]
