= Richard Davisson =

Richard Joseph "Dick" Davisson (December 29, 1922 – June 15, 2004) was an American physicist.

Davisson was the son of Clinton Davisson, a Nobel laureate, and his wife Charlotte; Davisson's maternal uncle, Sir Owen Richardson, was also a Nobel laureate.

During World War II he worked on the Manhattan Project as part of the Special Engineer Detachment. At Los Alamos, he met Professor Robert Williams, who later recruited him to teach at the University of Washington.

As a graduate student at Cornell after World War II, Davisson built a cosmic ray machine that would do everything but write a grad student's thesis. He acquired a huge magnet from Navy surplus, built a cloud chamber and a set of Geiger counters and designed a universal-focus camera to record cosmic ray events. Then he designed and built an early electronic computer to record and sort the events according to energy, mass, charge, direction and frequency. Davisson went on to the University of Washington without a PhD.

Davisson was a member of the University of Washington's team which designed a system for detecting subatomic particles known as muons. After the U.S. government pulled the funding on the Superconducting Super Collider project, the team was recruited by CERN to help build part of the muon detector of the ATLAS experiment in the Large Hadron Collider particle accelerator, in which Davisson took part, e.g., creating tools to test the detector tubes and as a liaison between the University of Washington's team and the rest of the collaborating group.

Davisson retired in 2000, at the age of 77. He was married for forty years to Elizabeth "Betty" Davisson, a retired psychiatric social worker from whom he separated after fourteen years. They had one son.
