= SHAPE America =

American physical education association

- Society of Health and Physical Educators
- Formation: Established in 1885, 136 years ago.
- Founder: Edward Hitchcock
- Founded at: Brooklyn, NY
- Legal status: Organization
- Purpose: To advance professional practice and promote research related to health and physical education, physical activity, dance and sport.
- Headquarters: Baltimore, MD
- Region served: United States of America, all 50 states.
- Owner: President - Kymm Ballard
- Website: https://www.shapeamerica.org/
- Formerly called: American Alliance for Health, Physical Education, Recreation and Dance (AAHPERD)

The Society of Health and Physical Educators, known as SHAPE America, is an American organization that provides support to professionals in health, physical education, recreation and dance.

SHAPE America has had six previous names, most recently the American Alliance for Health, Physical Education, Recreation and Dance (AAHPERD), and previously the American Association for Health, Physical Education and Recreation (AAHPER).

== Related and/or sister organizations ==
- American Association for Health, Physical Education, and Recreation (AAHPER)
- American Association for Health, Physical Education, Recreation, Dance and Sport (AAHPERDS)
- American Association for Physical Activity and Recreation (AAPAR)
- American Association for Health Education (AAHE)
- National Association for Girls and Women in Sport (NAGWS)
- National Association for Sport and Physical Education
- National Dance Association (NDA)

The alliance at the September 2009 Board of Governor's meeting voted to move forward on motions for the exit of the American Association for Health Education and the restructuring of the National Association for Girls and Women in Sport.

== National standards ==
Associations allied with SHAPE America have developed the following national standards.

- Physical education: NASPE publishes standards for K-12 physical education, for sport coaches, and for beginning physical education teachers.
  - Moving into the Future: National Standards for Physical Education, 2nd Edition: Voluntary national standards for K-12 physical education .
  - Quality Coaches, Quality Sports: National Standards for Sport Coaches: Fundamental competencies that athletic coaches from beginning coach to master coach should possess .
  - National Standards for Beginning Physical Education Teachers, 2nd Edition: Knowledge, skills, and dispositions that the beginning teacher of physical education should possess . Serve as the basis for teacher certification and program development for preparation of physical education teachers.
  - National Standards & Guidelines for Physical Education Teacher Education, 3rd Edition: This publication provides the knowledge, skills, and dispositions that the beginning teacher of physical education should possess. It serves as the basis for teacher certification and program development for preparation of physical education teachers.
- Health education: AAHE publishes standards critical to the healthy development of children and youth.
  - Health Education Standards, Second Edition: National Health Education Standards provide a foundation for curriculum development, instruction, and assessment of student performance. National Health Education Standards provide a guide for enhancing preparation and continuing education of teachers.
- Dance education: NDA standards were completed as part of a project developed by the Consortium of National Arts Education Associations and prepared under a grant from the U.S. Department of Education, the National Endowment for the Arts, and the National Endowment for the Humanities.
  - The National Standards for Dance Education: The dance standards guide content and achievement at grades K-4, 5–8, and 9–12. The standards help ensure that the study of dance is disciplined and well focused and that dance instruction has a point of reference for assessing its results.

== Districts and states ==
SHAPE America has the following districts:

- Central: Colorado, Iowa, Kansas, Minnesota, Missouri, Nebraska, North Dakota, South Dakota, Wyoming
- Eastern: Connecticut, Delaware, District of Columbia, Maine, Maryland, Massachusetts, New Hampshire, New Jersey, New York, Pennsylvania, Puerto Rico, Rhode Island, Vermont, Virgin Islands
- Midwest: Illinois, Indiana, Michigan, Ohio, West Virginia, Wisconsin
- Western: Alaska, Arizona, California, Guam, Hawaii, Idaho, Montana, Nevada, New Mexico, Oregon, Utah, Washington
- Southern: Alabama, Arkansas, Florida, Georgia, Kentucky, Louisiana, Mississippi, North Carolina, Oklahoma, South Carolina, Tennessee, Texas, Virginia

Each state has a separate association.

#	State	Name of association (or organization)	Website
1	Alabama	Alabama State Association for Health, Physical Education, Recreation and Dance (ASAHPERD)	
2	Alaska	Alaska Association for Health, Physical Education, Recreation, and Dance (AKAHPERD)	
3	Arizona	Arizona Association for Health, Physical Education, Recreation and Dance (AzHPE)	
4	Arkansas	Arkansas Association for Health, Physical Education, Recreation and Dance (ArkAHPERD)	
5	California	California Association for Health, Physical Education, Recreation and Dance (CAHPERD)	
6	Colorado	Colorado Association for Health, Physical Education, Recreation and Dance (COAHPERD)	
7	Connecticut	Connecticut Association for Health, Physical Education, Recreation & Dance (CTAHPERD)	
8	Delaware	Delaware Association for Health, Physical Education, Recreation, and Dance (DAHPERD)	
9	Florida	Florida Association for Health, Physical Education, Recreation, Dance and Sport (FAHPERDS)	
10	Georgia	Georgia Association for Health, Physical Education, Recreation, and Dance (GAHPERD)	
11	Hawaii	Hawaii Association for Health, Physical Education, Recreation, and Dance (HAHPERD)	
12	Idaho	Idaho Association of Health, Physical Education, Recreation, and Dance (IAHPERD)	
13	Illinois	Illinois Association for Health, Physical Education, Recreation & Dance (IAHPERD)	
14	Indiana	Indiana Association for Health, Physical Education, Recreation, and Dance (IAHPERD)	
15	Iowa	Iowa Association For Health, Physical Education, Recreation And Dance (IAHPERD)	
16	Kansas	Kansas Association for Health, Physical Education, Recreation and Dance (KAHPERD)	
17	Kentucky	Kentucky Association for Health, Physical Education, Recreation, and Dance (KAHPERD)	
18	Louisiana	Louisiana Association for Health, Physical Education, Recreation and Dance (LAHPERD)	
19	Maine	Maine Association for Health, Physical Education, Recreation and Dance (MAHPERD)	
20	Maryland	Maryland Association of Health, Physical Education, Recreation and Dance (MAHPERD)	
21	Massachusetts	Massachusetts Association for Health, Physical Education, Recreation and Dance (MAHPERD)	
22	Michigan	Michigan Association for Health, Physical Education, Recreation and Dance (MAHPERD)	
23	Minnesota	Minnesota Society of Health and Physical Educators (MNSHAPE)	
24	Mississippi	Mississippi Association for Health, Physical Education, Recreation and Dance (MAHPERD)	
25	Missouri	Missouri Association for Health, Physical Education, Recreation, and Dance (MOAHPERD)	
26	Montana	Montana Association for Health, Physical Education, Recreation and Dance (MTAHPERD)	
27	Nebraska	Nebraska Association for Health, Physical Education, Recreation and Dance (NAHPERD)	
28	Nevada	Nevada Association for Health, Physical Education, Recreation and Dance (NAHPERD)	
29	New Hampshire	New Hampshire Association for Health, Physical Education, Recreation and Dance (NHAPERD)	
30	New Jersey	New Jersey Association for Health, Physical Education, Recreation and Dance (NJAHPERD)	
31	New Mexico	New Mexico Association for Health, Physical Education, Recreation and Dance (NMAHPERD)	
32	New York	New York State Association for Health, Physical Education, Recreation, and Dance (NYSAHPERD)	
33	North Carolina	North Carolina Association for Athletics, Health, Physical Education, Recreation, and Dance (NCAAHPERD)	
34	North Dakota	North Dakota Society of Health and Physical Educators (NDSHAPE)	
35	Ohio	Ohio Association for Health, Physical Education, Recreation & Dance (OAHPERD)	
36	Oklahoma	Oklahoma Association for Health, Physical Education, Recreation, and Dance (OAHPERD)	
37	Oregon	Oregon Alliance for Health, Physical Education, Recreation and Dance (OAHPERD)	
38	Pennsylvania	Pennsylvania State Alliance for Health, Physical Education, Recreation and Dance (PSAHPERD)	
39	Rhode Island	Rhode Island Alliance for Health, Physical Education, Recreation and Dance (RIAHPERD)	
40	South Carolina	South Carolina Alliance for Health, Physical Education, Recreation and Dance (SCAHPERD)	
41	South Dakota	South Dakota Association for Health, Physical Education, Recreation and Dance (SDAHPERD)	
42	Tennessee	Tennessee Association for Health, Physical Education, Recreation, and Dance (TAHPERD)	
43	Texas	Texas Association for Health, Physical Education, Recreation & Dance (TAHPERD)	
44	Utah	Utah Alliance for Health, Physical Education, Recreation, and Dance (UAPERD)	
45	Vermont	Vermont Association for Health, Physical Education, Recreation, and Dance (VAHPERD)	
46	Virginia	Virginia Association for Health, Physical Education, Recreation, and Dance (VAHPERD)	
47	Washington	Washington Alliance for Health, Physical Education, Recreation and Dance (WAHPERD)	
48	West Virginia	West Virginia Association for Health, Physical Education, Recreation and Dance (WVAHPERD)	
49	Wisconsin	Wisconsin Association for Health, Physical Education, Recreation, and Dance (WAHPERD)	
50	Wyoming	Wyoming Association for Health, Physical Education, Recreation, and Dance (WAHPERD)	

== National convention ==
Location	Year	Theme	Annual conference	AAHPERD president
Brooklyn, NY	1885			Edward Hitchcock
	1886		Would have been the 1st Anniversary Convention	Edward Hitchcock
	1887		Would have been the 2nd Anniversary Convention	Edward Hitchcock / William Blaikie
	1888		Would have been the 3rd Anniversary Convention	William Blaikie
	1889		Would have been the 4th Anniversary Convention	William Blaikie
	1890		Would have been the 5th Anniversary Convention	William Blaikie / Dudley Sargent
	1891		Would have been the 6th Anniversary Convention	Dudley Sargent / Edward M. Hartwell
	1892		Would have been the 7th Anniversary Convention	Edward M. Hartwell / Dudley Sargent
	1893		Would have been the 8th Anniversary Convention	Dudley Sargent
	1894		Would have been the 9th Anniversary Convention	Dudley Sargent / Jay Seaver
	1895		Would have been the 10th Anniversary Convention	Jay Seaver / Edward M. Hartwell
	1896		Would have been the 11th Anniversary Convention	Edward M. Hartwell
	1897		Would have been the 12th Anniversary Convention	Edward M. Hartwell
	1898		Would have been the 13th Anniversary Convention	Edward M. Hartwell
	1899		Would have been the 14th Anniversary Convention	Edward M. Hartwell / Dudley Sargent
	1900		Would have been the 15th Anniversary Convention	Dudley Sargent
	1901		Would have been the 16th Anniversary Convention	Dudley Sargent / Watson Savage
	1902		Would have been the 17th Anniversary Convention	Watson Savage
	1903		Would have been the 18th Anniversary Convention	Watson Savage / Luther Gulick
	1904		Would have been the 19th Anniversary Convention	Luther Gulick
	1905		Would have been the 20th Anniversary Convention	Luther Gulick
	1906		Would have been the 21st Anniversary Convention	Luther Gulick
	1907		Would have been the 22nd Anniversary Convention	Luther Gulick / George Meylan
	1908		Would have been the 23rd Anniversary Convention	George Meylan
	1909		Would have been the 24th Anniversary Convention	George Meylan
	1910		Would have been the 25th Anniversary Convention	George Meylan
	1911		Would have been the 26th Anniversary Convention	George Meylan
	1912		Would have been the 27th Anniversary Convention	George Meylan / R. Tait McKenzie
	1913		Would have been the 28th Anniversary Convention	R. Tait McKenzie
	1914		Would have been the 29th Anniversary Convention	R. Tait McKenzie
	1915		Would have been the 30th Anniversary Convention	R. Tait McKenzie
	1916		Would have been the 31st Anniversary Convention	R. Tait McKenzie / Ernst Arnold
	1917		Would have been the 32nd Anniversary Convention	Ernst Arnold / William Burdick
	1918		Would have been the 33rd Anniversary Convention	William Burdick
	1919		Would have been the 34th Anniversary Convention	William Burdick
	1920		Would have been the 35th Anniversary Convention	William Burdick / Dudley Reed
	1921		Would have been the 36th Anniversary Convention	Dudley Reed
	1922		Would have been the 37th Anniversary Convention	Dudley Reed
	1923		Would have been the 38th Anniversary Convention	Dudley Reed / Carl Schrader
	1924		Would have been the 39th Anniversary Convention	Carl Schrader
	1925		Would have been the 40th Anniversary Convention	Carl Schrader
	1926		Would have been the 41st Anniversary Convention	Carl Schrader / Charles Savage
	1927		Would have been the 42nd Anniversary Convention	Charles Savage
	1928		Would have been the 43rd Anniversary Convention	Charles Savage
	1929		Would have been the 44th Anniversary Convention	Charles Savage / Frederick Maroney
	1930		Would have been the 45th Anniversary Convention	Frederick Maroney
	1931		Would have been the 46th Anniversary Convention	Frederick Maroney
Philadelphia, PA	1932	Physical Education Professional Students	47th Anniversary Convention	Mabel Lee
Louisville, KY	1933		48th Anniversary Convention	Jesse F. Williams
Cleveland, OH	1934		49th Anniversary Convention	Mary C. Coleman
Pittsburgh, PA	1935	Health & Physical Education in the New Social	50th Anniversary Convention	Strong Hinman
St. Louis, MO	1936	Physical Education and the Enrichment of Living	51st Anniversary Convention	Anges R. Wayman
New York City, NY	1937		52nd Anniversary Convention	Charles McCloy & William Moorhead
Atlanta, GA	1938		53rd Anniversary Convention	Neils P. Neilson
San Francisco, CA	1939		54th Anniversary Convention	Grederick Cozens
Chicago, IL	1940	Service for Youth	55th Anniversary Convention	Margaret Bell
Atlantic City, NJ	1941	Preparedness - Today and Tomorrow	56th Anniversary Convention	Hiram Jones
New Orleans, LA	1942	National Fitness Through Health - Physical	57th Anniversary Convention	Ann Duggan
Cincinnati, OH	1943	Victory Through Fitness	58th Anniversary Convention	Jay Nash
New York City, NY	1944	Fitness for Today and Tomorrow	59th Anniversary Convention	August Pritzlaff
	1945		Would have been the 60th Anniversary Convention	
St. Louis, MO	1946	Fitness for the American Way of Life	61st Anniversary Convention	William Hughes
Seattle, WA	1947	Problems and Plans	62nd Anniversary Convention	Helen Manley
Kansas City, MO	1948	New Horizons	63rd Anniversary Convention	Vaughn Blanchard
Boston, MA	1949	Together We Build	64th Anniversary Convention	Ruth Evans
Dallas, TX	1950	Round-Up on the Range	65th Anniversary Convention	Carl Nordly
Detroit, MI	1951	Accent on Youth and Democracy	66th Anniversary Convention	Dorothy Ainsworth & Frank Stafford
Los Angeles, CA	1952	United Effort Effective Action	67th Anniversary Convention	Bernice Moss
	1953		Would have been the 68th Anniversary Convention	
New York, NY	1954	The Challenge of Values	69th Anniversary Convention	Clifford Brownwell
	1955		Would have been the 70th Anniversary Convention	
Chicago, IL	1956	Action with Purpose	71st Anniversary Convention	Ruth Abernathy
	1957		Would have been the 72nd Anniversary Convention	
Kansas City, MO	1958	Forward with Fitness in 1958	73rd Anniversary Convention	Ray Duncan
Portland, OR	1959	Fitness for the Space Age	74th Anniversary Convention	Patricia O'Keefe
Miami Beach, FL	1960	Forging Forces for Fitness 1885–1960	75th Anniversary Convention	Arthur Esslinger
Atlantic City, NJ	1961	The Pursuit of Excellence	76th Anniversary Convention	Minnie Lynn
Cincinnati, OH	1962	Strengthening Human Resources	77th Anniversary Convention	Arthur Daniels
Minneapolis, MN	1963	Interpreting Health, Physical Education, and Recreation	78th Anniversary Convention	Anita Aldrich
Washington, DC	1964	New Dimensions for Progress	79th Anniversary Convention	Ben Miller
Dallas, TX	1965	Our Profession (Cultural Focus)	80th Anniversary Convention	Catherine Allen
Chicago, IL	1966	Achieving Through Action	81st Anniversary Convention	Reuben Frost
Las Vegas, NV	1967	Education is Our Business	82nd Anniversary Convention	Leona Holbrook
St. Louis, MO	1968	Gateway to Aahpertunity	83rd Anniversary Convention	Joy Kistler
Boston, MA	1969	Committed Action Requires Effort	84th Anniversary Convention	Mabel Locke
Seattle, WA	1970	We Ourselves Must Change to Master Change	85th Anniversary Convention	John M. Cooper
Detroit, MI	1971	ESP - efforts to save programs	86th Anniversary Convention	Laura Mae Brown
Houston, TX	1972	Enhancing “The Quality of Life”	87th Anniversary Convention	Louis E. Alley
Minneapolis, MN	1973	Unity Though Diversity	88th Anniversary Convention	Barbara E. Forker
Anaheim, CA	1974	Fantasy - Reality - Goals	89th Anniversary Convention	Willis J. Baughman
Atlantic City, NJ	1975	Come Alive in '75	90th Anniversary Convention	Katherine Ley
Milwaukee, WI	1976	Share in the Future	91st Anniversary Convention	Roger C. Wiley
Seattle, WA	1977	Alliance on the Move	92nd Anniversary Convention	Celeste Ulrich
Kansas City, MO	1978	Put It All Together	93rd Anniversary Convention	LeRoy T. Walker
New Orleans, LA	1979	Building Tomorrow	94th Anniversary Convention	Margaret Coffey
Detroit, MI	1980	No theme found in program book	95th Anniversary Convention	Glenn M. Smith
Boston, MA	1981	The Alliance Sets Sail for Boston	96th Anniversary Convention	Fay R. Biles
Houston, TX	1982	Teamed for Excellence	97th Anniversary Convention	Peter W. Everett
Minneapolis, MN	1983	A Wellspring for Tomorrow	98th Anniversary Convention	Mary K. Osness
Anaheim, CA	1984	Alliance Spirit	99th Anniversary Convention	Wayne H. Osness
Atlanta, GA	1985	The Centennial	100th Anniversary Convention	Bea N. Orr
Cincinnati, OH	1986	Creating Images	101st Anniversary Convention	Anthony A. Annarino
Las Vegas, NV	1987	Roots and Wings	102nd Anniversary Convention	Barbara Day Lockhart
Kansas City, MO	1988	Creating Unity	103rd Anniversary Convention	Robert A. Pestolesi
Boston, MA	1989	Strength through Diversity	104th Anniversary Convention	Jean L. Perry
New Orleans, LA	1990	New Horizons: Opportunities in the 1990s	105th Anniversary Convention	Joel Meier
San Francisco, CA	1991	Commitment to Excellence: A Shared Responsibility	106th Anniversary Convention	Doris R. Corbett
Indianapolis, IN	1992	Leadership for Healthy Lifestyles	107th Anniversary Convention	Harold H. Morris
Washington, DC	1993	(QP2 ) Quality Programs Quality Professionals	108th Anniversary Convention	Mimi Murray
Denver, CO	1994	Sharing Our Vision	109th Anniversary Convention	Michael G. Davis
Portland, OR	1995	Bridges for Our Future	110th Anniversary Convention	Carol V. Persson
Atlanta, GA	1996	Celebrating the Olympic Spirit	111th Anniversary Convention	Quentin A. Christian
St. Louis, MO	1997	Dare to Soar!	112th Anniversary Convention	Karen J. Dowd
Reno, NV	1998	Change...the only constant	113th Anniversary Convention	Keith P. Henschen
Boston, MA	1999	Take the Challenge...Go the Distance	114th Anniversary Convention	Jill W. Varnes
Orlando, FL	2000	Connections	115th Anniversary Convention	Ronald S. Feingold
Cincinnati, OH	2001	Passing The Baton, Leaving a Legacy	116th Anniversary Convention	Lucinda W. Adams
San Diego, CA	2002	A New Alliance: Power in Partnership	117th Anniversary Convention	Glenn M. Roswal
Philadelphia, PA	2003	Soar with your Strengths	118th Anniversary Convention	JoAnne Owens-Nauslar
New Orleans, LA	2004	Together We Can Lead the Way	119th Anniversary Convention	Stephen L. Cone
Chicago, IL	2005	The Present is our Future	120th Anniversary Convention	Shirley Holt/Hale
Salt Lake City, UT	2006	Visions for our Future—Reflections on our Past	121st Anniversary Convention	Jerry E. Landwer
Baltimore, MD	2007	Valuable, Viable, Visible	122nd Anniversary Convention	Danny Ramsey Ballard
Ft. Worth, TX	2008	Celebrate Life Together—Take Time!	123rd Anniversary Convention	John Bennett
Tampa, FL	2009	Many Voices, One Mission	124th Anniversary Convention	Monica Mize
Indianapolis, IN	2010	Strength Through Partnerships	125th Anniversary Convention	Dana Brooks
San Diego, CA	2011	Oceans of Opportunity	126th Anniversary Convention	Vicki Worrell
Boston, MA	2012		127th Anniversary Convention	
Charlotte, NC	2013		128th Anniversary Convention	
St. Louis, MO	2014		129th Anniversary Convention	
Seattle, WA	2015		130th Anniversary Convention	
Minneapolis, MN	2016		131st Anniversary Convention	
Boston, MA	2017		132nd Anniversary Convention	
Nashville, TN	2018		133rd Anniversary Convention	
Tampa, FL	2019		134th Anniversary Convention	
Salt Lake City, UT	2020		135th Anniversary Convention (cancelled)	
Virtual	2021		136th Anniversary Convention	
New Orleans, LA	2022		137th Anniversary Convention	Terri Drain
Seattle, WA	2023		138th Anniversary Convention	Kymm Ballard
Cleveland, OH	2024		139th Anniversary Convention	Sarah Benes

- Information of the 1885-1950 and 1982-2008 was shared via email from the conference staff at AAHPERD.
- Information of the 1950-1982 taken from conference programs collected by Lynn W. McCraw of the University of Texas at Austin
- Information of the 2008–present conventions was found online through the AAHPERD website.

== Programs ==
=== Let's Move in School ===
The goal of Let's Move in School is to ensure that every school provides a comprehensive school physical activity program with quality physical education . Let's Move in School is urging physical educators, parents, school administrators and policymakers to get involved in bringing quality physical education and physical activity to schools through a comprehensive school physical activity program.

In 2012 and again in 2016, SHAPE America published the SHAPE OF THE NATION Report : Status of Physical Education in the USA."

== See also ==
- Adapted Physical Education
- Dance
- Health
- Health Education
- National Dance Association
- Physical Education
- Recreation
