= Checkley (surname) =

Checkley is a surname. Notable people with the surname include:

- Edwin Checkley (1847–1925), British-born American athlete
- George Checkley (1893–1960), New Zealand-born architect and academic
- Laura Checkley, English actress and comedian
