= Margaret Bell =

Margaret Bell may refer to:

- Margaret Bell (athlete) (1917–1996), Canadian Olympic athlete
- Margaret Bell (physician) (1888–1969), American physician
- Margaret Bell (gymnast) (born 1945), British gymnast
