= National Dance Association =

Defunct association of SHAPEAmerica

- Established: 1932
- Affiliations: American Alliance of Health, Physical Education, Recreation and Dance
- Location: Reston, Virginia, US
- Website: National Dance Association

The National Dance Association (NDA) was a dance education organization, with a membership of over 3,500 instructors, administrators, scientists, and dancers across all U.S. States, leading the standardization of dance education in the United States from 1932 to 2013. As the need for a national force in dance education in the United States grew, the organization developed programs, published books and materials, and sponsored professional development conferences for dance educators in a broad range of disciplines. The National Dance Association developed standards for dance education, advocated for arts education reform, produced publications important to dance education, and included notable figures in the dance world.

== History of the NDA and US dance education ==
The NDA was first known as the National Section on Dance and was officially recognized in 1932 with Helen Norman Smith as chair. The National Section on Dance was recognized first by the American Physical Education Association. It was elevated to Divisional status in 1965 and nine years later became the National Dance Association within the newly renamed American Alliance for Health, Physical Education, Recreation and Dance (AAHPERD). As a freshly recognized association, the NDA consisted of approximately 2,000 people, mostly dancers and dance instructors. Beginning with less intensive efforts, such as conferences on dance education, the National Dance Association's mission expanded to encompass advocacy, arts education reform, and nationwide educational standards from its founding to its dissolution. In 2013, the NDA was dissolved as AAHPERD became one unified organization and changed its name to SHAPE America (Society of Health and Physical Education). Before the dissolution, on July 26, 2012, the members of the National Dance Association, through a group vote, elected Susan Mayes to the board of directors, one of the last primary elections before the group was dissolved.

Although it was founded in the 1930s, the National Dance Association gained substantial traction in the 1960s, specifically the 1965 signing of the “Arts and Humanities Bill” by former president Lyndon B. Johnson, as well as the creation of the “National Endowment for the Arts,” both of which kick-started the advocacy for fine arts education in the United States’ educational programs. American reports such as “A Report on Elementary Education in America” and “Toward Civilization: A Report on Arts Education” argued for the necessity of credible, high-quality arts education in schools. Before any intervention by the National Dance Association, dance education in a K-12 context had primarily been taught as a segment of physical education classes and, often, offered only to women. According to government reports, only about 35% of programs had definitive standards for what should be taught. Throughout the mid- to late 1900s and early 2000s, alongside many changes in arts education, the National Dance Association advocated for policy and legislative changes by creating overarching standards and educating the public about dance education. In the 2000s, the signing of the Goals 2000 Act recognized arts education as a requirement for primary education for American students, including dance education, which further spurred the push for dance education standards in the United States education system.

== Major contributions ==
=== The seven standards ===
The National Dance Association, as part of the Consortium of National Arts Education Associations, which was formed in 1992, helped develop the seven national standards for dance education for teachers nationwide. The distribution of the seven standards, financially supported by the United States Department of Education, spread nationwide, and the standards themselves became a foundation that instructors across the country used to teach all visual arts, not just dance, and to ensure their students met educational standards. The “seven standards,” as they were called, were written and divided into three segments based on the individual student's age and abilities. Each of the seven standards had different descriptions for the three developmental categories, but served as general standards for all dance educators. As quoted in Millie Rhodes Claiborne's “Dance Assessment and National Standards: 1994-2002," the seven standards are as follows:

1. Identify and demonstrate movement elements and skills in performing dance.
2. Understand choreographic principles, structures, and processes.
3. Understand dance as a way to communicate.
4. Apply critical and creative thinking to dance skills (problem-solving).
5. Demonstrate dance in various historical and cultural periods.
6. Make connections between dance and healthful living.
7. Connect dance to other disciplines.

The seven standards received mixed reviews. Some members of the dance world were cautious about the standards being too high for all students to have equal access to dance education that could meet them. In contrast, others were hopeful and excited about the establishment of the official standards.

=== Implementation efforts ===
Another contribution from the National Dance Association was their efforts to implement these standards into the underdeveloped world of dance education. The NDA and its members shifted their focus to holding workshops and classes around the country for local dance educators to learn the standards and strategies for implementing them into their curricula. To assist in the challenging act of assisting dance educators with putting the seven standards into action in their classes, the National Dance Association developed a comprehensive “implementation plan for dance educators,” with eight clear steps for dance teachers to follow to successfully transform their students’ educational experiences. The eight steps included purchasing and reading the seven standards, judging the standards in conversation with their current curriculum, creating an implementation plan that also included “outside the box” ideas not included in the seven standards, creating valuable ways to evaluate the success of their new classes, improving their classes based on evaluations, and sharing the successes and pitfalls of their plans with other educators.

Other significant projects directed by the NDA included the formation of consultants, who were trained dance educators who traveled to assist other instructors with their implementation plans. To expand their efforts nationwide, the NDA created newsletters, worked with university dance departments, and established a standardized registration process for dance instructors.

=== Conferences ===
The National Dance Association held annual conferences in which it showcased National Dance Scholars who presented innovative approaches to dance education and unique perspectives on dance education standards. These national conferences invited dance education innovators from institutions across the country to give lectures on their philosophies of teaching and aimed to advance the NDA's goal of “Sharing [Their] Mission,” which was to disseminate dance education research at the national level.

=== Advocacy ===
Another contribution of the National Dance Association was its dual function as an arts advocacy organization. The NDA, along with other organizations, sponsored Arts Advocacy Day, a day dedicated to demanding policy reform on arts education from the United States administration. The NDA also advertised a “Dance Advocacy Kit” on its website in the 2000s for community members interested in social protest for the arts, which detailed how to safely and effectively call for educational reform. The NDA released a statement outlining its ideology, stating that “The Arts Leave No Child Behind,” advocating for arts education for the whole child and every child. The NDA also worked to establish the National Dance Honor Society, “Nu Delta Alpha,” which was created to recognize and honor the work and service of dancers and dance educators at all levels. The NDA also signed the Philadelphia Resolution, which advocated for the inclusion of well-organized, in-depth dance education in K-12 classroom learning across the country.

== Publications and research ==
The National Dance Association circulated many publications during its time as a leader in dance education. One notable publication is “Dance Education…What Is It? Why Is It Important?” This document addressed the NDA's question of what makes a dance program genuinely beneficial and supplementary, while also advocating, through public distribution, that the benefits of dance education be public knowledge. Additionally, the NDA collaborated with other associations belonging to The Four Arts Education Organization to produce a document titled “Opportunity to Learn Standards for Arts Education,” which outlines the necessary equipment, knowledge, and certifications required to establish effective dance education programs. Often credited as the NDA's most popular publication, “Creative Dance for All Ages,” written by Anne Green Gilbert in 1992, transformed how the dance community viewed movement and encouraged creative dance as a means of teaching other disciplines and improving physical and mental well-being. The National Dance Association was a major contributor to the “Dance Education in America and Museum Project,” a conference that discussed dance heritage through art.

== Notable figures ==
At the National Dance Association's April 1994 convention in Denver, Colorado, Shirley Ririe was honored as a keynote speaker for the NDA's research organization. Ririe, who was the director of the Woodbury Dance Company in Salt Lake City, Utah, was the first person in NDA history to receive this recognition. Her recognition as the keynote speaker helped signify the NDA as an official dance research organization. Her work as the speaker transformed dance research from academic research to research through active participation in choreography and performance. Another notable figure in the NDA was the 1994 Scholar of the Year, Sue Stinson, a professor at the University of North Carolina, Greensboro, who developed a model of dance education that emphasized language as the core principle of teaching dance. Other National Dance Association award winners include Edward Villella, Margie Hanson, Ruth Solomon, Alwin Nikolais, Betty Toman, and Theresa Purcell. Additionally, Margaret H’Doubler was the recipient of the NDA's highest honor, the Heritage Award for Lifetime Achievement, in 1963.
