= Margaret Bell (physician) =

Physician and professor at University of Michigan

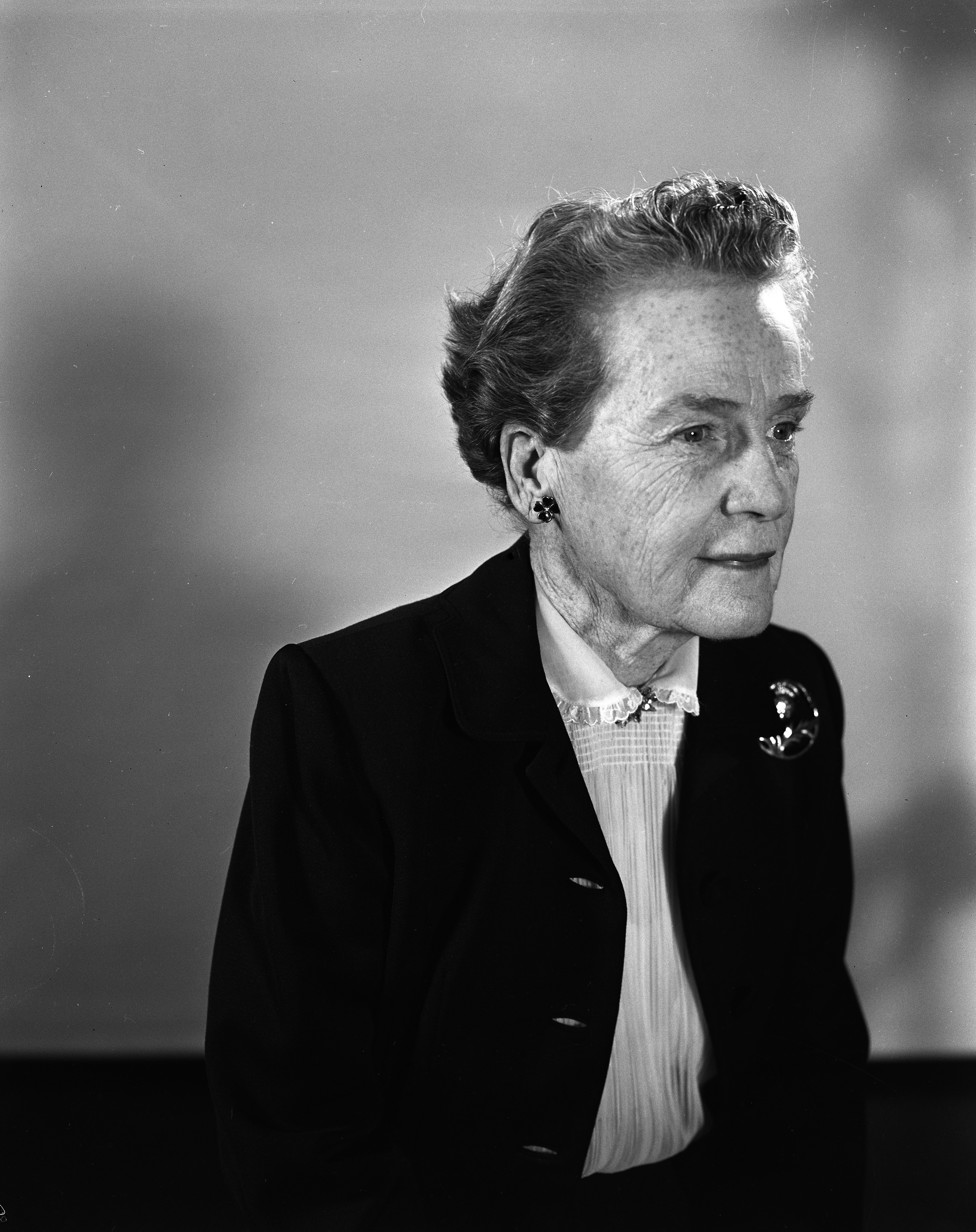
- Portrait of Dr. Margaret Bell, Professor at the University of Michigan. Bentley Historical Library, University of Michigan
- Born: 1889; Chicago, Illinois
- Died: 1969 (aged 80–81)
- Monuments: Margaret Bell Pool on the University of Michigan campus
- Occupation: Director of Physical Education for Women at the University of Michigan from 1923–1957

Margaret Bell (1888–1969) was the Professor of Hygiene and Physical Education, Chairman of the Program of Physical Education for Women, and in charge of the Women's Medical Service at the Health Service at the University of Michigan from 1923 to 1957. She became a full professor at the University of Michigan in 1924. When the Department of School Health and Physical Education of the National Education Association and the American Physical Education Association merged in 1938 and became the American Association for Health, Physical Education, and Recreation in 1939, Bell was named the first president of the new organization.

The Bell Pool at the University of Michigan is named in her honor.

Bell was a fellow of the American College of Physicians).

== Life, education, and professional career ==
Bell was born in 1888 in Chicago. She was the daughter of Frank Elliot and Elizabeth T. Bell. She went to the John Dewey Laboratory School in Chicago. Bell graduated from Sargent Normal School of Physical Education in 1910, and received her Bachelor of Science from University of Chicago in 1915. She graduated from the Trudeau School of Tuberculosis in 1920, and later received her M.D. from Rush Medical School in 1921. She received a certificate from the San Francisco Hospital in 1923. She did post graduate work at the University of Chicago, University of Michigan, Vienna, Austria, and New York Post Graduate School of Medicine.

Bell was an instructor of Physical Education and Recreation in many institutions in Chicago, including South Park Playground in 1910, Englewood High School, Teachers College, and the University of Chicago.

Bell began as an Associate Professor of Hygiene and Physical Education at the University of Michigan in 1923, and became a full Professor of Hygiene and Physical Education for Women in 1924. She was also the chairman of the Department of Physical Education for Women, and was head of the women's medical service at the Health Service in 1923–24. Through these two roles, Bell was able to put all students at the university on the same footing to receive all privileges of the Health Service and gymnasium. During World War II, she also served on the University War Board, as a member of the Committee on Contributions of Physical Education and Health Fields to War program. She also served on the Governing Board of the Michigan League.

Bell was an advocate for women's athletics, both at the University of Michigan and nationally. She served as president of the Mid-West Directors of Physical Education for Women in Colleges and Universities from 1930 to 1932, and also, on the Program Committee of the National Directors of Physical Education for Women in Colleges and Universities in 1933-35. She was an active member of the American Physical Education Association, serving on the Executive Committee and Legislative Board of the Women's Athletic Section.

Margaret Bell never married, and died in 1969.

== Department of Physical Education for Women ==
Margaret Bell was a firm advocate for women's athletics and physicality. Despite the belief of others in her time—that athletic competition was harmful to women, both psychologically and sociologically—she believed that intense competition was important for women to explore their role as women, wives, and mothers. She believed it was important for women to participate in all sports, as it helped them socially and emotionally.

Under her tenure as Chairman of the Program of Physical Education for Women, women's athletics grew extensively. When Bell arrived at the University of Michigan, women had both separate gymnasiums and fields than the men. Women met and played in the Barbour Gymnasium, which had been built in 1896 as the counterpart to the all-male Waterman Gymnasium, and women played on Palmer Field, the counterpart to the all-male Ferry Field. Bell was director of the Barbour Gymnasium and helped fight to raise money to expand the physical education facilities for women. As Chairman of the Program of Physical Education for Women, Bell overlooked the activities that occurred at Barbour Gymnasium and Palmer Field, including physical education courses, dances, and open gymnasium times where women could come and meet other female students from around the university.

In 1927, when the famous Michigan Stadium, or "Big House", was built, the Board in Control of Athletics also gave $250,000 for a field and field house for women. The board admitted that improvements were needed in intercollegiate athletics, something that Bell had been trying to prove since she arrived at the university. Before these improvements, Palmer Field was uneven land, difficulty to play on. Palmer Field was leveled out at that time, and the field house was erected. She finally received the money for women's athletics, and a Women's Athletics Building was built on Palmer Field, between the campus and the Detroit Observatory The Women's Athletic Building was demolished in 1975 to make room for the Central Campus Recreation Building on campus. It stood where the Central Campus Recreation Building and the Margaret Bell Pool stand today.

She aspired to have health examinations become a fundamental aspect of the physical education system. In the years between 1930 and 1944, Bell wrote extensively about health examinations. World War II, especially, solidified the need for these examinations in Bell's mind. She believed that in order for women to efficiently replace men in their jobs while they were off at war, there was an immense need for women to engage in healthy habits, such as sufficient amounts of sleep, relaxation and meditation, mental hygiene, and regular exercise. Bell believed the best way to monitor the success of women following this plan was to encourage family doctors to fill out a physical examination form that would include information on health history, examination findings, any diagnoses, and the doctor's recommendations for each female student and her health. She wanted these medical cards to be filed in schools and made available to the appropriate school faculty.

Bell also encouraged her students to become physical education teachers, as she recognized her own vocation as one that truly developed young people into full, healthy adults. She believed that physical education did more than help develop muscles, but in the end, also helped mental and moral culture. She was very proud of her occupation, and wanted to ensure that future youth could also develop in the same way that she felt she developed her students. She gave talks on multiple campuses, trying to ignite interest in a career in physical education in female students across the east and Midwest.

== Margaret Bell Pool ==
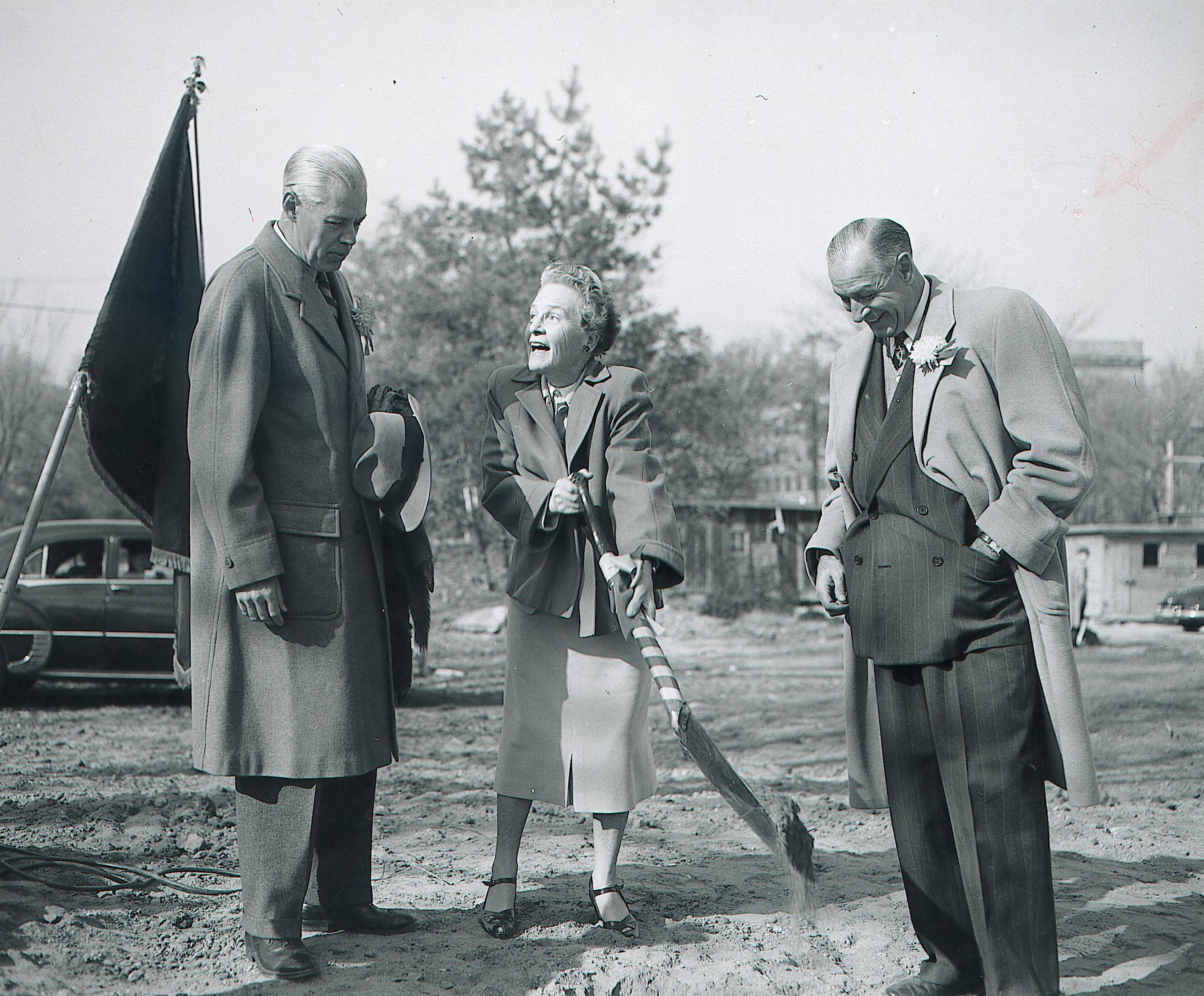
Margaret Bell Pool groundbreaking

Perhaps Bell's biggest accomplishment was the creation of an all women's pool in 1954, which Bell believed was a necessity for the 5400 female students attending the University of Michigan. It was a million dollar swimming pool for women, financed from a grant given by the Board in Control of Intercollegiate Athletics. The board gave the Women's Physical Education Department $3,500,000, and the pool used up $1,000,000 of this. In 1922, Bell wrote to the University President Marion Burton that women's athletics' first priority was to have their own swimming pool. Though it took a while to come into fruition, Bell admitted it was "the rare institution that has facilities and staff" that helped promote women's teams. She was proud that the University of Michigan was one of the leaders in this area.

It was named the Bell Pool in honor of Margaret Bell in 1966, at the recommendation of H.O. Crisler, the Athletic Director at the time. Before this, it was simply referred to as the Women's Swimming Pool. Michigan's Central Campus Recreational Building was later added on to the Bell Pool in 1976, and both remain in the same location on campus today.

== Local and national involvement ==
Due to Dr. Margaret Bell's reputation throughout her life in the field of physical education, Bell was asked to serve on many committees throughout her life.

In 1943, Bell served on the Southeastern Michigan Recreation Project, Department of Conservation's Ann Arbor Planning Committee. She accepted membership to this committee on December 2, 1943. The purpose of Bell's committee was to "provide better recreational facilities for the people of Southeastern Michigan". The Director of Department of Conservation, P.J. Hoffmaster, acknowledged Bell's contributions to the committee, and said it was largely through "individual efforts – such as [Bell's] – that the Legislature passed a bill making available monies to launch a program to provide 100,000 acres of land easily accessible to the dense population centers and for the enjoyment of all people". Bell served her own community and helped the organization take legislative action.

In 1945, Bell accepted a position with the State Board of Education and the Superintendent of Public Instruction to help establish an educational project dedicated to helping Michigan schools improve their health facilities and programs. The superintendent, Eugene B. Elliot, urged Bell to join the Advisory Committee, as a representative of both education and health. Bell served on the subcommittee of Program and Finance.

From 1947 to 1951, Bell served on a joint committee between the National Education Association and the American Medical Association which wrote "The Physical Educator Asks About Health", a document discussing the responsibility of the school to have a well-defined health policy, but in the absence of such a policy, the physical educator needs to initiate its development.

Bell was involved with many projects at local, state, and national levels due to her reputation and expertise in physical education.

=== American Association for Health, Physical Education, and Recreation: 1939–1940 ===
Bell became president of the American Association for Health, Physical Education, and Recreation in 1939, now called the American Alliance for Health, Physical Education, Recreation and Dance. She served as president for one year. Throughout her presidency, Bell proposed to more intensely permeate in people's minds the importance of physical education. She wanted responsibility placed on schools nationwide to ensure students were performing at an adequate level physically.

In 1944, Bell received a telegram from the office of the United States Commissioner of Education, J.W. Studebaker. The telegram urged Bell, among with three others, to come to Washington D.C. to discuss "urgent problems relating to the U.S. Office of Education". Studebaker was concerned that the American men going off to war were not physically fit enough to successfully fight. He believed that the only way to fix this was to make physical education a larger part of the school system. On July 29, 1944, Bell attended the meeting, where the group proposed "adequate staff in elementary, secondary, higher and vocational education in the fields of health services, health instruction, physical education, athletics, and recreation".

In 1949, Dr. Carl L. Nordly, the president of the American Association for Health, Physical Education, and Recreation, assigned Bell to the President's Committee on Affiliated Organizations. Bell accepted the position on July 25, 1949.

From September 12–15, 1956, Bell attended the American Association for Health, Physical Education, and Recreation Fitness Conference in Washington D.C. Only one hundred association members were invited. At the conference, members discussed the national concern for the physical state of the American youth.

=== Published opinions on views on gender and sexism ===
Margaret Bell spoke against those who believed that the menstrual process disallowed women from being active. This was the belief of this time period, and Bell was active in the movement to quiet this stigma. In 1954, in a letter to Dr. MacPhee, who worked with the Department of Health at Princeton University, Bell emphasized that "it can be said with some confidence that no appropriate team or individual competitive sport will injure the physical health of the normal girl or woman". She did not agree with the criticism against women's competition that mostly had to do with the fear of harming the reproductive tracts of women. Bell suggested that these "accusations do not seem very realistic since it is difficult to conceive of injuries of the reproductive tract through sports competition".

Bell believed the stigma around menstruation was the single worst factor that was limiting the successes of women in the job markets. She made it her mission to inform the ignorant on the subject. Bell wrote an article in Hygeia: The Health Magazine of the American Medical Association in March 1942, entitled "Answers to Practical Questions on Menstruation". In this article, she discussed the normalcy and importance of menstruation for the average woman, and that it should be not looked at with disdain or disgust, or as a sickness of any kind. She encouraged women to continue exercising during menstruation, and emphasized that it does not contaminate others at all.

Further, in an attempt to quiet this time period's critiques that suggested physical competition was harmful for women's reproductive abilities, Bell commented that the "purpose of the reproductive organs is to add satisfaction to the lives of women as well as men. A young woman should look forward to being a companionable wife and a worthy mother, as a man looks forward to being a good husband and a good father. Understanding and respect for one's sex have a great deal to contribute to the stability and progress of civilization".

== Bell's view on the working woman ==
Bell's views on women working changed profoundly throughout her life. Despite being a working woman herself, Bell spoke prominently about the importance of women at home in the economy during the economic crisis of the Great Depression. At a speech she gave at the Y.W.C.A. in Detroit on April 23, 1934, Bell discussed the many valuable identities of the non-working woman. Those that were homemakers, Bell said, were important because they stimulated qualities of spirit and soul. Bell explained that she believed women and men were different, and should not compete in the job markets, but should instead supplement each other.

During the Great Depression, there was an ideology that women should work to help contribute to the finances of the family. Bell, however, disagreed with this. She believed that women working were a "mistake in values", and that women should move back to the home and work on making a family. She believed women needed to "fulfill [their] womanly obligations".

Completely changing her tune from the Great Depression almost a decade earlier, Bell believed the advancement of women was dependent on women's physical health. In the midst of World War II, Bell was adamant that girls needed to have endurance, skill, and agility in order to "replace her brother on the home front in industry and in community life". Bell wanted to take advantage of the men being off at war, as she believed it posed a "great opportunity for women to demonstrate the great range of [their] capacities". She believed the only way to accomplish this was to increase the physical fitness of women, which would allow them to increase their strength, skill, and speed of actions and movement. Doing so, Bell felt, would allow women to both be more vigorous in their own lives, but more importantly, serve the country in the wake of World War II. She believed the role of women in the war effort was to replace the men in their jobs that they could no longer do due to the war, and she felt that physical fitness was crucial in being able to do so. Bell was able to accomplish this goal by serving on the Committee on Physical Fitness and Recreation through the Michigan Council on Defense from 1942 to 1945.
