= Helen Manley =

American physical educator

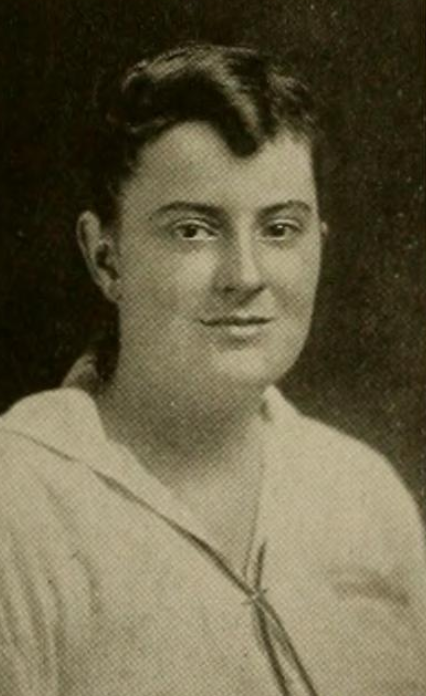
- Helen Manley, from the 1915 yearbook of Wellesley College
- Born: November 15, 1894; St. Louis, Missouri, U.S.
- Died: November 18, 1987 (aged 93)
- Occupation: Physical educator

Helen Manley (November 15, 1894 – November 18, 1987) was an American physical educator. She was president of several national and regional organizations for physical educators, and an educational consultant during the occupation of Japan after World War II.

== Early life and education ==
Manley was born in St. Louis, Missouri, the daughter of John David Manley and Mathilda Klugman Manley. She graduated from Wellesley College in 1915. She earned a master's degree at Teachers College, Columbia University, with further studies at New York University, the University of Wisconsin, and the University of California.

== Career ==
Manley was director of physical education at Marysville State Teachers College from 1924 to 1927, and director of health, physical education, safety, and camping in the public schools of University City, Missouri from 1920 to 1960. She considered all aspects of health and safety to be within her purview; she started the University City sex education program in 1930. She coached the high school girls' field hockey team.

Manley attended the Summer Olympics in Berlin in 1936, but believed that women were ill-suited for high-level athletic competition. She maintained that team sports were excellent for young women's enjoyment, health, and moral development. "I am against highly trained competition for women athletes," she explained in 1937. "Women are not physically fit for the excitement and strain that this competition affords." She also believed that only women should coach women's teams.

Manley was president of the Missouri State Physical Education Association, in 1936 and 1937. In 1946 she became a senior consultant on health and physical education for the U.S. Office of Education, and she went to Japan for three months in 1948, with the U.S. War Department. She was president of the American Association of Health, Physical Education, and Recreation (AAHPER) from 1946 to 1947, and won the Luther H. Gulick Award from AAHPER in 1958. She was president of the American Academy of Physical Education from 1959 to 1960.

As executive director of the Social Health Association of Greater St. Louis from 1960 to 1969, Manley continued to advocate for sex education in the public schools. She had a radio program, "Sex Facts and Fancies", and gave programs to local churches and parent groups about the value of sex education. "Information isn't a panacea, but it often straightens youngsters out and prevents their picking up misinformation and the wrong attitudes", she told a 1964 interviewer. She was president of the St. Louis Group Action Council, and active in the American Red Cross, the YMCA, and the Girl Scouts of America.

== Publications ==
- "Techniques of Teacher Supervision" (1938)
- "Progressive Games of Soccer Variety" (1939)
- "In-service Training of Physical Education Teachers" (1949)
- "Good Posture for Boys and Girls" (1949)
- "Sex Education in the Schools" (1951)
- Education through School Camping (1952)
- "A Traveling Seminar in Health" (1955)
- "Personal and Family Life Education in University City Schools" (1959)
- "Sex Education: Where, When, and How Should It Be Taught?" (1964)

== Personal life ==
Manley lived with three friends in Creve Coeur, Missouri; she traveled the world with one of her housemates, fellow physical educator A. Gwendolyn Drew. The two women led educational tours of Asian and African countries, and attended the Summer Olympics in Tokyo in 1964. She died in 1987, at the age of 93.
