= Sargent Center for Outdoor Education =

Coordinates: 42°55′53″N 71°59′46″W

The Sargent Center is an outdoor education facility located in Hancock, New Hampshire, USA. Founded in 1912 by Dudley Allen Sargent, the facility has been offering educational programs to children and adults for over 100 years.

The property is owned by Boston University, which operated the site until 2009. BU had planned to close down the camp on August 31, 2009, until Nature's Classroom stepped in to lease the property and continue operations starting in September 2009.

The facility is currently run by Nature's Classroom. Nature's Classroom at Sargent Center offers school programs to middle school students in New Hampshire and Massachusetts from September through June, as well as a summer camp for children and conference programs throughout the year.
