= Boston University College of Health and Rehabilitation Sciences =

School of Boston University

Coordinates: 42.349902°N 71.10317°W

Boston University Sargent College of Rehabilitation Sciences
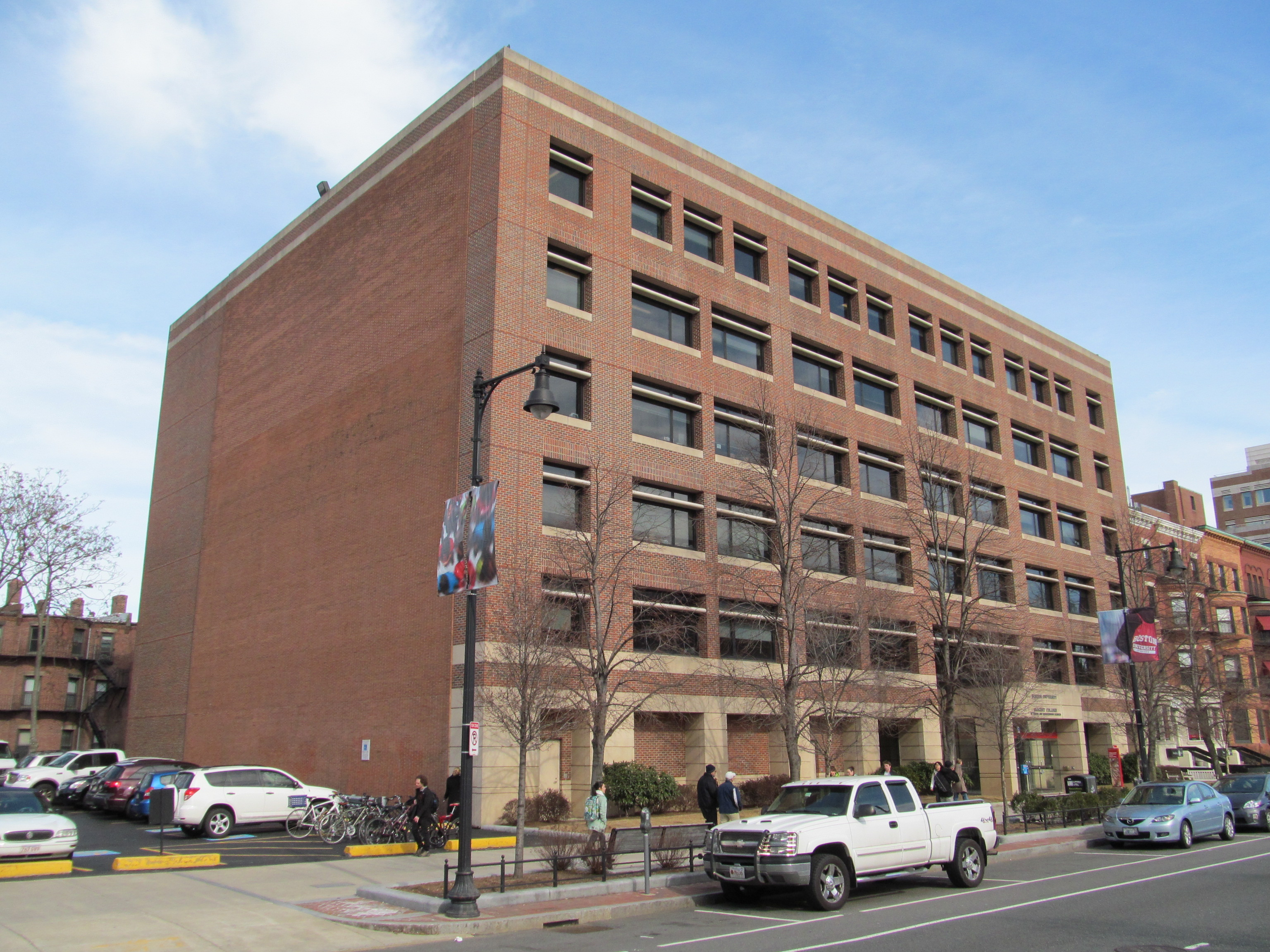
- Sargent College
- Type: Private
- Established: 1881
- President: Melissa L. Gilliam
- Provost: Colin Duckett
- Dean: Jack Dennerlein
- Location: 635 Commonwealth Avenue, Boston, Massachusetts, United States
- Campus: Urban
- Website: bu.edu/sargent

The Boston University Sargent College of Health and Rehabilitation Sciences is one of 17 schools and colleges at Boston University. Established in 1881, Sargent offers both undergraduate and graduate degree programs to prepare students for a variety of careers and advanced study in the health and the rehabilitation sciences. The College has more than 30 on-campus research facilities and clinical centers and offers degree programs in occupational therapy, physical therapy, speech therapy, language and hearing sciences, health science, human physiology, behavior and health, and nutrition. The school has more than 21,200 alumni in 76 countries, 250 faculty and staff, and more than 1,950 combined enrolled graduate and undergraduate students.

As reported by U.S. News and World Report, its graduate programs in Speech-Language Pathology and Physical Therapy rank in the top 20 while Occupational Therapy is #1 (tied) in the nation.

The current dean of Sargent College is Jack Dennerlein.

== Mission, Vision, and Values ==
Sargent College's vision is to advance the health and well-being of all people.

The mission is to:

- Advance knowledge of health and rehabilitation through science and scholarship,
- Prepare our students to be leaders discovering what is possible, and
- Transform clinical practice through integrated research centers, partnerships, and outreach.

As a collaborative and diverse community of learners, scholars, professionals, and practitioners, Sargent values excellence achieved through scientific discovery, experiential learning, inclusion, accessibility, creativity, and innovation.

== History ==
In 1881, Dudley Allen Sargent founded the Sargent School of Physical Training in Cambridge, Massachusetts. During the decades that followed the establishment of the School, Sargent built a reputation as an innovator in physical conditioning and health promotion. At the Sargent School, students learned training techniques to strengthen and improve the physical capabilities of all people, including both disabled and healthy individuals. This emphasis on comprehensive health care remains a focus of the College today. Sargent College became part of Boston University in 1929, five years after Sargent's death.

In the fall of 1990, BU Sargent College moved to an extensively renovated facility at 635 Commonwealth Avenue. The six-story building contains classrooms, student lounges, research laboratories, an outpatient clinic, and faculty and staff offices.

== Areas of study ==
The Sargent College has four academic departments that confer degrees upon undergraduate and graduate students:

- Department of Health Sciences
- Department of Occupational Therapy
- Department of Physical Therapy
- Department of Speech, Language & Hearing Sciences

=== Undergraduate ===
Sargent offers the following degrees at the undergraduate level:

- Bachelor of Science (BS)
  - Behavior & Health
  - Health Science
  - Nutritional Science
  - Speech, Language & Hearing Sciences
  - Dietetics
  - Human Physiology

=== Graduate ===
Sargent offers the following degrees in the graduate program:

- Master of Science (MS)
  - Human Physiology
  - Nutrition
  - Nutrition-Dietetic Internship
  - Speech-Language Pathology
- Doctor of Occupational Therapy (OTD)
  - Entry-Level
  - Post-Professional
- Doctor of Philosophy (PhD)
  - Human Physiology
  - Speech, Language & Hearing Sciences
  - Rehabilitation Sciences
- Doctor of Physical Therapy (DPT)

== Clinical Education Centers ==
BU Sargent College Clinical Education Centers are licensed, fee-for-service facilities offering a wide range of services to BU students, faculty, staff, and the greater Boston community. The centers, staffed by certified clinicians, are fully equipped with individual treatment rooms. Students can develop their skills in a supervised, on-campus setting, participate as Work-Study aides, and collaborate with faculty on research projects. A multi-service outpatient facility in the building allows students to learn health care techniques from faculty clinicians. Observation rooms with two-way mirrors and digital video recording equipment are located throughout the centers, fostering a learning atmosphere that promotes excellence in evaluation and treatment.

- Clinical Education Centers include:
- Academic Speech, Language & Hearing Center
- Aphasia Resource Center
- Center for Neurorehabilitation
- Center for Psychiatric Rehabilitation*
- Center for Stuttering Therapy
- Physical Therapy Center
- Sargent Choice Nutrition Center
- Voice Center

*The BU Center for Psychiatric Rehabilitation, is the first nationally funded psychiatric rehabilitation center in the United States. As of 2005, it was designated as the World Health Organization Collaborating Center in Psychiatric Rehabilitation.

== Research ==
From studying effective rehabilitation for people with Parkinson’s disease to understanding why skeletal muscle atrophy occurs, BU Sargent College faculty are active researchers as well as instructors. The college secured more than $17.7 million in sponsored research funding in the most recent fiscal year for its research projects from organizations such as the National Institutes of Health, the National Science Foundation, and the US Department of Education.

There are more than 30 faculty research laboratories and 9 integrated clinical research centers at Sargent College. Faculty research specializations include ergonomics, autism, language disorders, stroke, neuroscience, physiology, nutritional epidemiology, and sports-related injuries. Students work alongside faculty on a daily basis to build the research foundations for evidence-based practices in the health and rehabilitation sciences professions

== U.S. News & World Report 's Best Graduate Schools rankings ==
Over the years, U.S. News & World Report's Best Graduate Schools rankings have consistently found the graduate programs at BU Sargent College to be among the best in the country. As of 2026, Sargent College graduate programs ranked as follows: occupational therapy program was ranked number 1 (out of 282 programs), physical therapy was ranked number 16 (out of 264 programs), and speech-language pathology was ranked number 6 (out of 283 programs).
