= Alan Calvert =

American businessman, weightlifting advocate, and author (1875–1944)

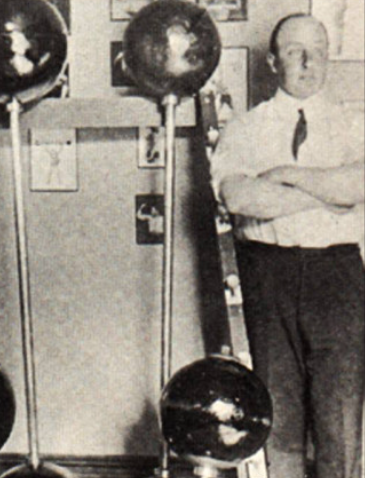
- Born: 1875
- Died: June 24, 1944 (aged 68–69); St. Davids, Pennsylvania, U.S.
- Occupations: Businessman, magazine publisher, author
- Spouse: Mary Uhle Githens
- Children: 4

Alan Calvert (1875 – June 24, 1944) was an American businessman, magazine publisher, and author. He was an advocate of weightlifting as an exercise regimen and a competitive sport. He was a pioneer in the development of adjustable weightlifting equipment. He received a patent for the Milo Adjustable Barbell and founded the Milo Barbell Company in 1902 to produce commercially available barbells. He sold the company in 1920 and it was renamed York Barbell. He published Strength magazine, one of the first strength training magazines in the United States, and several books on weight training.

== Biography ==
Calvert was born in 1875. He became interested in weightlifting after reading A Natural Methodist of Physical Training by Edwin Checkley and How to Get Strong and How to Stay So by William Blaikie. He initially implemented a low-weight, high-repetition regimen but was disappointed in the results. After meeting with Eugen Sandow in Chicago, he became an advocate for the addition of heavy weights into his exercise regimen. However, he soon realized there were no barbells available commercially in the United States.

His father owned a tin-plating business and Alan was familiar with metal working which helped him in the design and manufacture of barbells. He received a patent for the Milo Adjustable Barbell in January 1902. The barbell featured a compartment which could be loaded with shot to increase the weight. He founded the Milo Barbell Company in April 1902. The barbell and company were named after Milo of Croton, the ancient Greek wrestler known for his size and strength. He developed a second generation barbell that had a combination of loaded shot and weighted plates within the end spheres. In 1919, he received a patent for a barbell with adjustable plates of different widths that fit within a sphere. The plates were easier to handle than loading shot. The production of readily-available, standardized barbells advanced the popularity of weight training in the United States.

He was a showman who put on demonstrations of his barbells and billed himself as "Milo the Great". He advertised his barbells in magazines such as Physical Culture and National Police Gazette, however these were mostly sports magazines and the publishers were not strong advocates of strength training. He founded Strength magazine in 1914 to educate people about the proper techniques of strength training. It was one of the first strength-training magazines in the United States, and was published from 1914 to 1920. The magazine showcased bodybuilding events and highlighted Calvert's barbell products.

He was an advocate for the standardization of weights, performance of lifts, and weight classes in weightlifting competitions. He promoted the American Board of Control to supervise competitive weightlifting competitions and his efforts resulted in the development of the American Continental Weight-Lifter's Association, the first nationwide sports governing body for weightlifting in the United States. He debunked many of the tricks of performing strongmen such as chain and coin breaking. His efforts resulted in the acceptance of weightlifting as a respectable sport and weight training as an accepted exercise regimen to improve health and appearance.

In 1919, he sold both the Milo Barbell Company and Strength magazine to Richard L. Hunter and Daniel G. Redmond. In 1932, the company was purchased by Bob Hoffman, who renamed it York Barbell.

Calvert wrote several books about weightlifting. In his writings, he promoted progressive strength training, and he argued: "There is no greater asset in the business world, and in the social world, than a fine physique."

Calvert died on June 24, 1944, in St. Davids, Pennsylvania, and was interred at West Laurel Hill Cemetery in Bala Cynwyd, Pennsylvania.

== Selected works ==
- Calvert, Alan (1911). The Truth about Weight Lifting. Philadelphia. OCLC 8895592.
- Calvert, Alan (1924). Super Strength. Philadelphia: Milo Publishing Company. OCLC 637901992.
