= Edward M. Hartwell =

American academic (1850-1922)

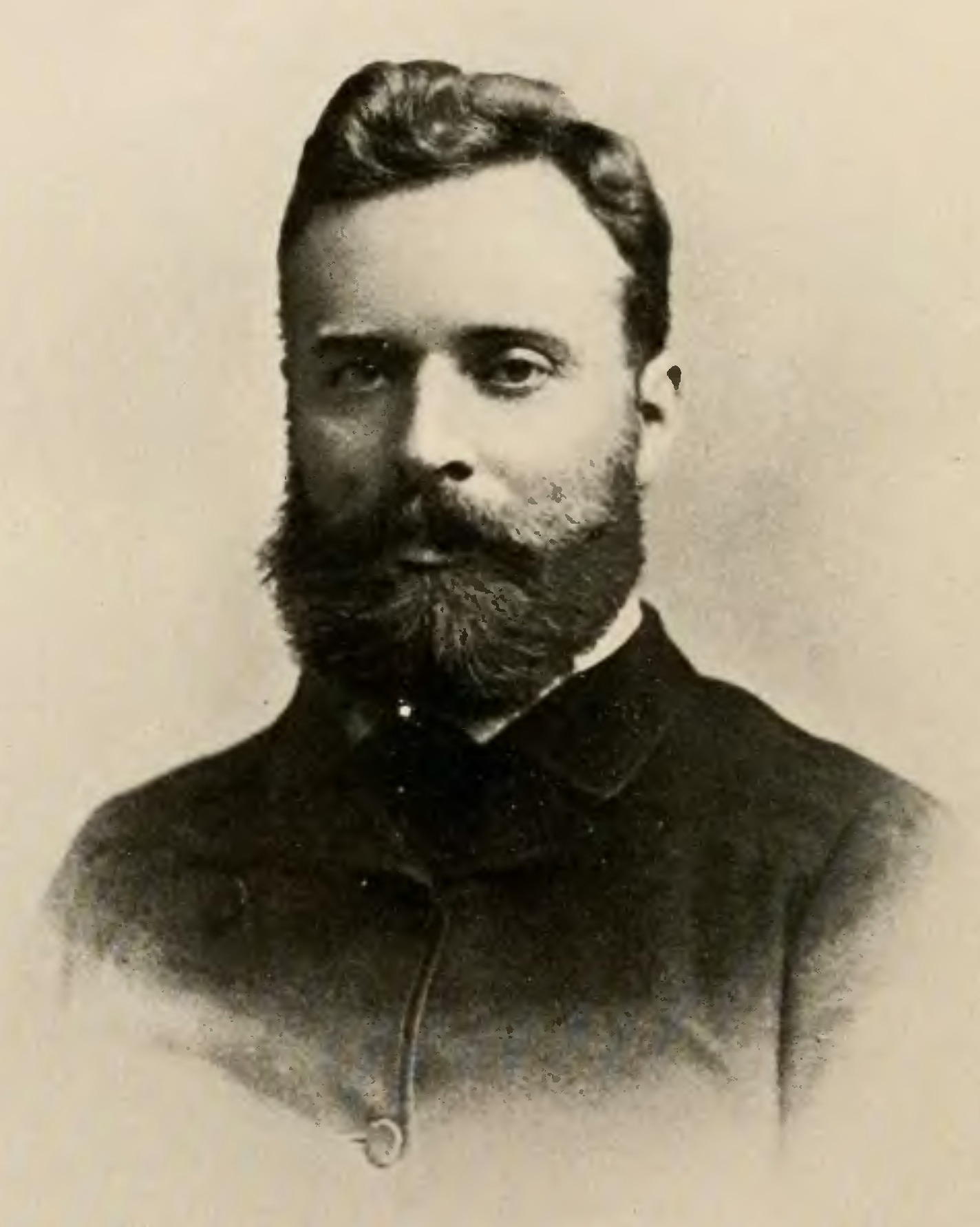
- Born: 20 May 1850
- Died: 1922

Edward Mussey Hartwell (1850–1922) was an American academic who taught at Johns Hopkins University.

== Biography ==
He was born in Exeter, New Hampshire to parents Josiah Shattuck Hartwell and Catherine Stone Hartwell on May 29, 1850, as the eldest of eight children. Edward M. Hartwell attended Lawrence Academy before graduating from the Boston Latin School, after which he enrolled at Amherst College. Hartwell received his bachelor's degree in 1873, and became vice principal at a school in New Jersey before taking a position at the Boston Latin School. He left Boston to pursue medical studies at Miami Medical College in Cincinnati in 1877, but chose to enroll at Johns Hopkins University the next year for biology. A year after earning an advanced degree from Hopkins, Hartwell completed a medical degree at Miami in 1882. He then joined the Hopkins faculty as associate in physical training and director of the gymnasium. Hartwell was named an inaugural fellow of the American Statistical Association in 1914, and died in 1922.

== Honors and awards ==
Honorary Fellow in Memoriam, National Academy of Kinesiology
