= Nash's Pyramid =

Framework for ranking leisure activities

Nash's Pyramid is a framework for ranking leisure activities, developed by Jay B. Nash. Nash was an early leader in the leisure field. His thinking was influenced by the prevalence of 'Spectatoritis' in America which he defines as, "a blanket description to cover all kinds of passive amusement".

The pyramid begins at the ‘spectatoris-type level’ which includes activities that require no critical thought, such as watching television. Leisure activities in higher tiers allow for the participant to develop as a person and are characterised by a higher level of individual engagement. The apex of the pyramid is the 'creative participation' level, where a person uses their own experience to create a new medium. This can include a painting or a composition. Activities which cause harm to either society or the individual, such as crime or gambling, fall below the pyramid.

The pyramid was formative in the creation of the 'leisure research' approach in the field of leisure studies. This approach relies heavily on social philosophy. It has become less relevant as contemporary post-modern and post-structural understandings of leisure have relied more on scientific theories and quantitative methods of analysis.

Nash's understanding of leisure, and his pyramid, have been significant in the development of America's physical education program. To equip adults with the tools to lead a happy life, he believed the education curriculum should be sufficiently broad enough to teach children hobbies and skills. From its traditional emphasis on gymnastics and hygiene, the physical education system started to reform in the 1930s to include a greater variety of exercises.

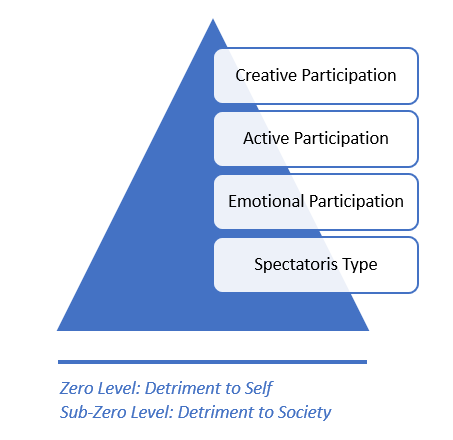
Pyramid Interpretation of Nash's Theory of Leisure

== Hierarchy ==
Nash suggests historical perspectives towards leisure justify a new theory on play. A culture of severity and the Protestant reformation led to a de-valuing of leisure time throughout the Middle Ages. It is only with the Industrial Revolution and the mechanisation of work that leisure time could be considered an opportunity for stimulation.

When constructing his pyramid, Nash's description of recreation as a, "basic need," is based on two assumptions. Firstly, humans are inherently active. They are most fulfilled when either their body or mind is stimulated, the determination to achieve this state being called the ‘activity drive.’

Secondly, there exists a work–life balance binary and, "leisure alone is not enough to satisfy [the activity drive], neither is work unless it has significance." Industrialisation, through labour-saving technology, routinised the work environment and allowed for more free time. Nash's pyramid suggests that recreation is a ‘need’ because it provides the intellectual and emotional stimulation required by humans.

The pyramid orders activities according to their opportunity for personal growth. It begins at a neutral level which describes activities used to "kill time." Any activity falling in the above three tiers, creative, emotional or active participation, provide a fulfilling experience as the participant is allowed an opportunity to be involved in the experience.

The criteria for higher-tier activities include those that have an associated ‘inner drive’, contribute to the fullness of life, build stature through self-confidence, include others and allow an individual to relax.

Any activity which is of detriment to the self or society, falls below the neutral section. This includes crime and delinquency. The general criteria for low-tier activities is that they undermine health, be routine, be carried on for reward only and be disliked.

Where an activity falls within the framework depends on the participant. Individual experiences are unique and people have different reactions to activities.

=== Creative participation ===
Maker of the Model, inventor, painter and composer

The participant creates a new medium from their own experiences. This includes the formation of language, social groups and dance. Nash uses these historical examples to show the importance of tier and how it is human nature to engage in the creative process. To challenge what he sees as society's fear of failure, Nash states, "There is tremendous creative capacity in the common people if only they have the freedom and opportunity to explore, to follow hunches, to find a talent niche.”

=== Active participation ===
Copying the model, playing the part

A participant follows the rules and systems established by a ‘creator’. This could include an athlete playing soccer or an actor performing a script. Nash suggests playing the part forces a unique appreciation for the model which cannot be achieved by just watching.

=== Emotional participation ===
A person moved to appreciation

A participant spectates, and experiences a reaction, to an activity. It is different to just passive watching. Potential responses include being moved to appreciation or experiencing an emotion. The level and extent of engagement depends on the participant's own experiences and emotions.

=== Spectatoritis type ===
Entertainment, amusement, escape from monotony, killing time – antidote to boredom

In this tier, activities do not engage a participant. They are instead an escape from life's routine. Nash suggested society had a tendency to participate in spectator -type activities, limiting the possibility for self-improvement. He called this phenomenon Spectatoritis. He warned that, "by constantly repeating the doses of primitive passive entertainment, man may become an addicts.”

Nash suggested the culture of mass media was contributing to the rise of spectatoritis. Radio tends not to be stimulating and only presents one view-point, limiting the potential for critical thinking.

Assuming mass media activities are, "properly chosen and properly used," Nash acknowledges they play some role in society. This is because they would require active engagement and belong to a higher tier within the pyramid.

=== Zero-level ===
Excesses

Activities in this tier cause harm against in the individual. It includes drinking and gambling. Nash believed in the development of a social ego within a social group. Individuals, when they chose to be self-preserving, prevent the creation of a social ego and can cause injury to themselves.

=== Sub-zero level ===
Delinquency, Crime

Nash stated crime and delinquency has been glorified. Acts performed against society belong to the lowest tier of the leisure pyramid. They create tension and undermine the social ego.

== Methodology and results ==
Nash interviewed 1000 people. Each person was asked to nominate 10 happy people and describe their work and leisure activities, leading to an analysis of 10,000 individuals.

Of the individuals nominated as 'happy', there was wide variety in the careers and ages. Common characteristics used to describe happy people included; ambition, curiosity, emotional stability, aliveness, vitality and integrity. More correlation existed in the types of activities they participated in with "Few" people listing spectatoris activities, such as mass media forms, as enjoyable and important.

The data showed a link between happiness and enjoyment of activities. Nash suggested this is because recreation, such as sport, provides an opportunity for competition and risk. This helps fulfil an individual who should, "Die with your boots on, with a hundred interesting, unfinished activities for which there was just not time. On such prescription, one may live long and happy.”

== Nash's perspective of leisure ==
Nash stated a society should be judged on how effectively it used its leisure time as when, "civilians cease to face challenges they will deteriorate and die." Increases in leisure time could be counter-productive unless used intelligently.

For society to engage in higher-tier forms of leisure, Nash believed skill and hobby development should begin in young children. Children should be allowed to experience a wide-range of leisure pursuit and, through a trial-and-error approach, determine which hobby creates an intrinsic motivation to keep practising. This process is most effective in the young. Early adolescents are awarded more freedom by their parents and begin to have greater autonomy in their leisure pursuits. They are also receptive to learning new skills, being unafraid of both failure and the requirement to practice. As evidence, Nash suggests many young masters began the skill-development process early with Galileo being 17 when he founded the law of the pendulum.

For all people to be productive in their leisure time, the education system should be reformed to help young people develop hobbies. Nash suggested that education was a tool for shaping society and a well-rounded curriculum, through both formal and informal means, could result in an increase in the general level of skills. Physical activity was a key component of the proposed plan. The then-current emphasis on hygiene and gymnastics should be expanded to include a daily period of physical exercise.

Contemporary leisure scientists view leisure education as a life-long process, one not exclusive to adolescents. It is the process of maximising leisure potential to achieve a desirable quality of life. Proficiency in a serious leisure activity requires a systematic approach to learning the relevant skills. An activity is likened to a 'career' and requires a substantial amount of knowledge, training and skill.

It is accepted that the education system can prepare young people to participate in serious leisure activities. Informal education can help develop an 'intrinsic motivation', called the 'activity drive' by Nash, needed for personal development. Students would be trained for both vocational opportunities and the ability to participate in a variety of cultural and artistic pursuits.

Education of leisure-pursuits is not generally incorporated into the contemporary curriculum as extra-curricular activities, by definition, fall outside the school syllabus. There have been some attempts to provide a more holistic approach to skill development, such as the leisure education curriculum in Israel. It provides both informal and formal frameworks to achieve its aim of providing students with the necessary skills to best use leisure time intelligently. The culture of Israel is work-focused however allows for great cultural diversity.

The intelligent use of leisure time by young people is important because they are at risk for delinquency, or activities falling below the pyramid. Nash stated there exists similarities between patterns of play and crime, both involve a struggle to overcome a challenge and feelings of mastery. Unless young people are allowed the opportunity to develop hobbies and skills, they could satisfy the activity drive by engaging in unhealthy leisure pursuits such as gambling.

TimeWise is an experimental program established to promote healthy leisure behaviours in American Middle School Students. Through leisure education, it aimed to prevent the early onset of unhealthy behaviours such as substance abuse. The study was successful on a small-scale. The participants reported higher levels of motivation and engagement with new activities when compared to the control group.

=== Effect on American physical education ===
Nash has been considered a leader in the field of American physical education. He was part of a broader school of thought that used the ideas of Dewey to argue informal activities that develop a child's abilities and interests could create habits for a happy life. In the 1930s, the physical education curriculum started to expand from its traditional focus on gymnastics to be more broad in the activities taught.

Historical factors supported a greater focus on general physical development. WWII, and the findings of the Kraus-Weber test, created fears that American children were physical inferior. Commercial sporting groups also grew in influence, facilitating investment into new equipment and facilities.

The influence of Nash was helped by his professional appointments. He was the Physical Education Department Chair at NYU from 1930 to 1954 and helped found the American Academy of Physical Education, now known as the National Academy of Kinesiology. Nash is Fellow #5 in the Academy, served as its inaugural Secretary, and later was elected its President. The highest-possible awards from the AAHPER and the American Academy of Physical Education recognize his contributions to the field.

== Theories ==
America was largely a rural-agrarian society during the colonial period and placed little value on leisure-pursuits. Instead, they valued hard-work. Industrialisation acted to transform society, creating urbanised cities and increasing access to new technology. A reduction in working hours and a rise in the general standard of living helped trigger a ‘leisure revolution’. This process was supported by Enlightenment-era ideas showing the importance of human development and freedom.

Leisure and technology become increasingly intertwined. Technology both increased people's access to leisure, through innovations such as cars and radio, and expanded existing forms of entertainment. For example, powerful sound systems supported music performances in a new open-air format.

Leisure theory originated with the organised play and recreation movement. It was closely linked to the emergence of parks in urbanised cities and eventually expanded to include the effects of leisure activities. Theories reflected an understanding that quality of life could be improved through recreation.

Early historians and leisure researches, such as Nash, were wary of the effects of industrialisation. When analysing the rise of spectator sport, there were criticisms it promoted passive observation instead of the active participation seen in rural areas. Historian Krout stated an increase in athletic interest, "has not made us a nation of participants in sports, but a nation of spectators at sporting events."

There existed three schools of through in North America to analyse leisure. Nash, along with Brightbill and Parker, were formative in the creation of the leisure research approach. This is where social philosophy is used to explain the purpose of leisure.

Social empiricism and social analysis are alternate schools of thought that analyse the behavioural decisions behind participation in leisure activities. Historically, North American models rely heavily on statistics and data collection. This contrasts to the European approach to leisure studies which preferences more general theories.

Nash's pyramid contributed to further academic work. Purple recreation are socially taboo recreational activities. Curtis's scale of purple recreation, which ranks activities from being extremely unacceptable to acceptable, draws from Nash's pyramid. For example creative activities rank highly as both a productive and acceptable form of leisure.

=== Contemporary leisure–activity theories ===
Leisure theories written after industrialisation and modernisation tend to suggest an individual can be made better through participation in leisure activities. Contemporary theories share Nash's view that recreational activities allow for feelings of success and achievement.

The most prominent framework for understanding leisure is the 'serious leisure framework' founded by Robert Stebbins. He defines serious leisure as a, "systematic pursuit of an amateur, hobbyist, or volunteer activity that participants find so substantial and interesting that, in the typical case, they launch themselves on a career centred on acquiring and expressing its special skills, knowledge and experience." Characteristics include a participant's commitment to the career, identification with the 'unique ethos' of the activity and opportunity for durable individual benefits such as self-enrichment.

By contrast, casual leisure is immediate, intrinsically rewarding and relatively short-lived. It requires limited training to participate and is essentially hedonistic. The repeated use of casual leisure activities, such as gambling or watching TV, for recuperation can become habitual however provides no opportunity for a leisure-career.

== Criticism ==
Nash defines leisure by the activities a person engages with outside their work-time. Feminist scholars have criticised the leisure activity approaches as it fails to include women with non-traditional working lives.

The pyramid outlines the benefits of higher-tier activities and not the associated costs. Some high-tier activities can be exclusionary to the working class who lack either the time or specialist equipment to participate.

Whilst significant in the era created, other models of experiences have become more widespread. This includes Csikszentmihalyi's 1985 model of flow. It assess the likelihood of a skill being totally absorbed and can consider recreational activities.

The decline in Nash's work mirrors the decline of leisure research. This includes the use of conjecture. From the 1990s, post-structuralism and post-modernism attitudes towards leisure studies have better incorporated scientific methods into analysis.

=== Criticisms of leisure–activity theories ===
Serious Leisure is defined by an individual's level of commitment. If the commitment is focused on just one activity, general breadth of experience and the ability to respond to a change in circumstance such as injury can be limited.

In empirical studies of serious leisure, analysts assume participation in an activity carries automatic benefits. This assumption has been criticised for being too general as it does not consider many different activities could be serious or casual depending on the individual's level engagement. Some scholars have suggested the framework be expanded to define leisure as an 'experience' so that personal differences can be better accounted for.

== See also ==
- Sociology of leisure
- Leisure studies
