= Edwin Checkley =

American athlete, physician, and the author of a book about strength-training

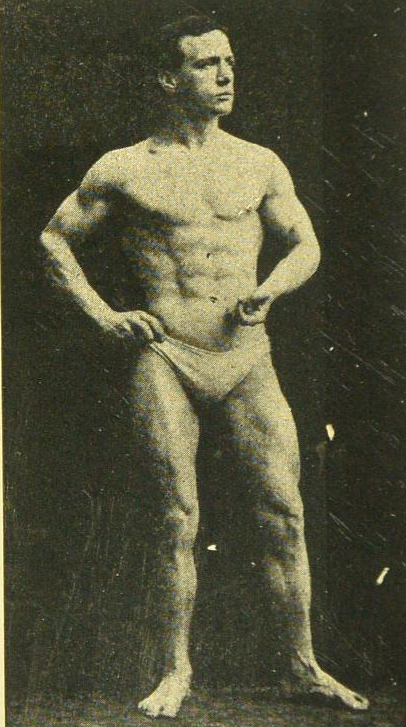
- Born: 1847; London, England
- Died: 1925 (aged 77–78)
- Education: Long Island Medical College
- Occupation(s): Athlete, physician

Edwin Checkley (1847–1925) was a British-born American athlete, physician, and the author of a book about strength-training. He was supposedly "one of the strongest men in America" in 1890.

== Life ==
Checkley was born in 1847 in London, U.K. He emigrated to the United States in 1871, settling in Brooklyn, New York City. He studied at the Long Island Medical College. By 1890, he had become a long-distance bicycle rider; for example, he rode from New York City to Chicago. That same year, he was "said to be one of the strongest men in America."

In his 1895 book, A Natural Method of Physical Training, Checkley advocated light bodyweight exercises without dumbbells. Nevertheless, the book inspired Alan Calvert, the founder of one of the first barbell companies in the world.

Checkley died in 1925.

== Selected works ==
- A Natural Method of Physical Training: Making Muscle and Reducing Flesh Without Dieting or Apparatus (1892)
- Checkley's Natural Method of Physical Training (1921)
