= William Blaikie =

American author (1843–1904)

- Born: May 24, 1843; York, New York, U.S.
- Died: December 6, 1904 (aged 61); New York City, U.S.
- Education: Boston Latin School; Harvard Law School
- Occupations: Lawyer, athlete, author

William Blaikie (May 24, 1843 - December 6, 1904) was an American lawyer, athlete, and the author of two books about strength training. He was described by The Evening World as "one of the earliest and most vigorous advocates of physical culture" in the United States.

== Life ==
Blaikie was born on May 24, 1843, in York, New York. He was educated in Boston, where he attended the Boston Latin School. He graduated from Harvard Law School in 1868.

Blaikie worked as a lawyer in New York City. An athlete, he was described by The Evening World as "one of the earliest and most vigorous advocates of physical culture" in the United States. He was a weightlifter and a long-distance walker. For example, he walked from Boston to New York City in four-and-a-half days. He authored two books about strength training, including How To Get Strong and How To Stay So, first published in 1879. One of his most assiduous readers was Alan Calvert, who went on to found one of the first companies to sell barbells and publish one of the first magazines on strength training in the United States.

With his wife, Blaikie resided at 52 East 21st Street, Gramercy Park, Manhattan. He died of apoplexy on December 6, 1904, in New York City, at 61.

== Publications ==
- How to Get Strong and How to Stay So (1883)
- Sound Bodies for Our Boys and Girls (1884)
