= American Physical Education Association =

Association to support gymnastics education

- Formation: 1885
- Type: Educational
- Legal status: Association
- Location: United States
- Affiliations: National Education Association

The American Physical Education Association (APEA), previously known as American Association for the Advancement of Physical Education, is an American association, founded in 1885 to support gymnastics education.

The name was changed in 1903, to the American Physical Education Association (APEA). And in 1917, it created one of its most influential groups, the Committee on Women's Athletics.

The APEA joined forces, becoming part of the NEA's Department of School Health and Physical Education in 1937, and then forming the Division of Recreation in 1938.
