= Theodore Woolsey =

Theodore Woolsey may refer to:

- Theodore Dwight Woolsey (1801–1889), American academic, author, and president of Yale University
- Theodore Salisbury Woolsey (1852–1929), American legal scholar, son of the above
- Theodore Salisbury Woolsey, Jr. (1879–1933), American forestry researcher and academic, son of Theodore Salisbury Woolsey
