= Alice Damrosch Kiaer =

American skier (1892–1967)

- Born: May 8, 1892
- Died: April 23, 1967 (aged 74); New York City
- Spouses: Hall Pennington (m. 1914, divorced); Dudley Wolfe (m. 1934; div. 1938); Herman Kiaer (m. 1940)
- Parent(s): Walter Damrosch; Margaret Blaine

Alice Damrosch Kiaer (/tʃer/ "chair", born Alice Blaine Damrosch; May 8, 1892 — April 23, 1967) was an American socialite and outdoorswoman. She was known for her promotion of competitive skiing in the United States, and organized the first US Women's Ski Team, which competed in the 1935 FIS Championship and the 1936 Winter Olympics. After her death, she was described by the New York Times as "one of the nation's first woman skiing stars".

== Biography ==
Alice was the first child born to Walter Damrosch, the conductor of the New York Symphony Orchestra, and Margaret Damrosch (née Blaine, 1867–1949), the daughter of politician James G. Blaine. It was Alice who introduced her father to jazz and to George Gershwin, who became a frequent dinner party guest of the Damrosch's; Walter Damrosch would eventually commission Gershwin on behalf of the Symphony, resulting in the Concerto in F.

Alice married her first husband, Hall Pleasants Pennington, an architect, in 1914. The relationship devolved almost immediately, with the new Mrs. Pennington spending all but the first night of her honeymoon with the Damrosches.

In 1929, facing a divorce from Hall and feeling her social life penned in by her famous father, Alice moved to St. Anton, Austria. In the late 1920s, she climbed the Matterhorn with friend Otto Furrer She began skiing seriously around this time, taking lessons from Hannes Schneider, famous for his ski school in St. Anton, who she had met as early as 1928. In March 1930, she won her first ski award at the Parsenn ski derby for women. In May 1932, she ascended Mont Blanc on skis (known as ski touring), again with the support of Furrer.

In his 1952 book The Story of Ski-ing, Arnold Lunn described her as "an exceptionally able and energetic lady" with a "dominant personality which is sometimes just a shade too dominant for reluctant dominees."

=== US Women's Ski Team and Nazi resistance ===
Roland Palmedo was organizing the first US men's team to compete in European races in 1935; he encouraged Alice to do the same for women.

In spring of 1934, she met her second husband, Dudley Wolfe, in St. Anton while skiing. The couple married later that fall. In November they returned to New York City for wedding celebrations, as well as a fundraiser for Alice's proposed women's Olympic ski team.

In 1935 the first women's US ski team competed in the International Ski and Snowboard Federation (FIS) World Championship, with the now-Mrs. Wolfe as their manager. The team competed again in the 1936 Winter Olympics; unlike the men's team, which had the support of the National Ski Association (NSA), the women were self-funded (with less wealthy members financially supported by Wolfe) and had no official uniform. They decided to coordinate by wearing white jackets, blue pants, and red knee socks, earning the nickname "The Red Stockings" from newspapers. The highest placement was 19th by Elizabeth Woolsey, which Wolfe attributed to the crowds and press overwhelming the inexperienced team.

Future Olympic games were put on hold due to World War II; Wolfe (who was part Jewish) was disturbed by the increasing Nazi presence in her second home of Austria. After the Anschluss in March 1938 and the arrest of Hannes Schneider, who had become a vocal critic of the Nazis, she used a persona of a pampered, apolitical American woman to advocate for his release. When she learned of Schneider's imprisonment, she warned the new local Nazi administration that Lunn—who had originated the event with Schneider—would likely cancel the Arlberg-Kandahar ski race, which was then considered the most important skiing competition. Lunn did cancel the event in protest after hearing the news from Wolfe. She recruited a lawyer friend, Karl Roesen, to assist Schneider, and bribed jail guards to let her visit every day and bring food until Schneider was moved to Garmisch under Roesen's care.

She continued to support the city of St. Anton during the war, smuggling in food and medicine from Switzerland.

=== Relationship with Dudley Wolfe ===
Meanwhile, her second marriage was unraveling; while Alice was satisfied with the relationship, Dudley was not, realizing he preferred living alone. He asked for a divorce in early 1938; Alice was resistant, but agreed some months later.

That year, Dudley met climber Fritz Wiessner via Alice, whose acquaintance she shared with climber and physician Hans Kraus and skier Betty Woolsey. Wiessner recruited Dudley to join the 1939 American Karakoram expedition to K2, during which Dudley was abandoned and died on the mountain; three Sherpas died in an attempt to rescue him. Dudley's remains were not recovered until 2002.

Wiessner informed Alice of the disaster via telegram. Later, he wrote Alice a letter explaining the events and his regrets. The two stayed in contact, and she would express her grief years later in a letter: “I still think about poor Dudley lying up there in the snow and probably will until I die.”

=== Later life ===
Alice married for a third and final time in June 1940 to Herman Kiaer (pronounced "chair"), a Norweigian businessman.

She stayed closely involved with the administration of competitive skiing. In 1939, she was the first American woman to represent the NSA at the FIS Congress, a role she filled again in 1949, 1951 and 1953. She served as chaperone for the women's team during the 1948 Winter Olympics, the first after the war, promoting the team in an article for Vogue. in 1952 she served as an unofficial problem solver for both US Olympic ski teams, including paying for the women's team's uniforms and equipment together with Kathleen Mortimer; and again in 1954, when she spent the winter between Austria, Sweden, and Norway.

In 1965, Kiaer was made an honorary citizen by the city of St. Anton, the first woman to be given the honor. She died in 1967 at her home in New York City.

As a result of her contributions to women's skiing, Kiaer was elected to the US National Ski Hall of Fame in 1969.
