= Bill House =

American mountain climber (1913–1997)

- Born: 30 May 1913; Pittsburgh, Pennsylvania
- Died: 18 December 1997 (aged 84); Peterborough, New Hampshire
- Education: Yale
- Occupations: climber and forester
- Known for: first ascent of House's Chimney on K2 and first ascent of Mount Waddington

William Pendleton House (1913–1997) was an American climber who was a key member of the 1938 American K2 expedition.

Bill was born in Pittsburgh, Pennsylvania, on May 30, 1913. He was a graduate of Yale Forestry School and whilst at Yale he was the President of the Yale Mountaineering Club and was a devotee of "buildering", night time climbing on sides of buildings.

After college he took a job with the Society for the Protection of New Hampshire Forests and was among the first to arrive on the scene of "The Great Marlow Fire" of 1941, the largest forest fire in New Hampshire's history. He went on to establish a forestry business in Chesham, New Hampshire.

== Notable ascents in the US ==
House was "regarded as one of the best rock climbers in the United States by the late 1930s". He climbed extensively in the Tetons and he demonstrated his skill on ice, when in March 1934 he and Alan Willcox made the second ascent of Pinnacle Gully in the Huntington Ravine on New Hampshire's Mount Washington, "then considered one of the hardest ice climbs in the east".

In 1934 House and Elizabeth Woolsey put up a new route on Jagged Mountain in the San Juan Mountains of Colorado. This has been described as "a technical cutting-edge alpine rock climb" on a peak which at the time was considered to be “the most difficult peak yet ascended in the Colorado Rockies.” Their descent route has now become the standard route up the peak.

In 1937 House, Wiessner and Lawrence Coveney made the first ascent, using modern climbing techniques, of the Devil's Tower, Wyoming. The only previous ascent had been achieved by creating a ladder of wooden pegs hammered in cracks. The 1937 ascent was largely unaided, Wiessner led almost the entire climb free, placing only a single piece of fixed gear, a piton, which he later regretted, deeming it unnecessary.

== Mount Waddington (1936) ==
There had previously been sixteen unsuccessful attempts on Mount Waddington before the first ascent was made in 1936. At the time it was Canada’s highest unclimbed peak at 4,019 m (13,186 ft), House was a key part of the successful team.

On July 4, House, Fritz Wiessner, Elizabeth Woolsey and Alan Willcox reached the head of the Knight Inlet. For the next twelve days they ferried loads to their base camp at Icefall Point on the Dais Glacier. While on the glacier, they were joined by another expedition led by members of the British Columbia Mountaineering Club and the Sierra Club. The House/Wiessner team agreed to allow the others a first chance at the summit but that group failed to find a route up the south face.

On July 20, Wiessner and House first attempted the line of a great couloir that comes directly down between the main summit tower and the northwest peak. It was an excellent line for quickly ascending but they were unable to traverse onto the south face proper due to poor rock conditions and were forced to retreat to base camp. By 3 am the next morning they were already climbing up a couloir to the right of the face. Good weather the past few days had cleared most of the snow away from the ledges making for good climbing conditions. Following the left branch of the couloir, they reached a snow patch in the middle of the face. The final 1,000 ft (300 m) of the south face then presented a fierce hurdle of "sheer forbidding-looking rocks" as noted by Wiessner. While Wiessner initially started in boots, he quickly changed to rope-soled shoes and gave his ice axe and extra rope to House. Wiessner led several pitches up technically difficult rock including several overhangs. After traversing east across the face they rested on a ledge just below the southeastern ridge, a full 9 hours since leaving the snow patch on the south face. After climbing a short chimney they finally reached the small snowy mass at the top, 13 hours after their start in base camp. They aborted their earlier plan of descending the shorter north face and retraced their ascent line, reaching their tent on the Dais Glacier at 2 am. The ascent to the summit and back to base camp had taken over 23 hours.

== K2 (1938) ==
House was also a key member of the 1938 American Karakoram expedition to K2. On that expedition he made the first ascent of House's Chimney which he free-climbed and was subsequently named after him. House reached the ice traverse at the top of the Abruzzi Ridge 24,700 ft (7,500 m), between camp 6 & 7, which was about 400m below the expedition's high point of 26,000 ft (7,900 m) a little above camp 7.

== World War II ==
During the Second World War House served as a civilian with the office of the Quartermaster General of the United States Army, in that role he undertook tours of duty in Iceland, Greenland and Arctic Canada. He was charged with the design, development, and testing of a variety of cold weather clothing and equipment for mountain troops, in particular the 10th Mountain Division. One of the spin-offs from this work was the development of the first nylon climbing rope.

In 1946 he was involved in Operation Musk Ox as a civilian observer for the Army Service Forces.

House was elected an Honorary member of the American Alpine Club. He died on December 18, 1997, in Peterborough, New Hampshire.
