= Mount Waddington =

Mountain in British Columbia, Canada

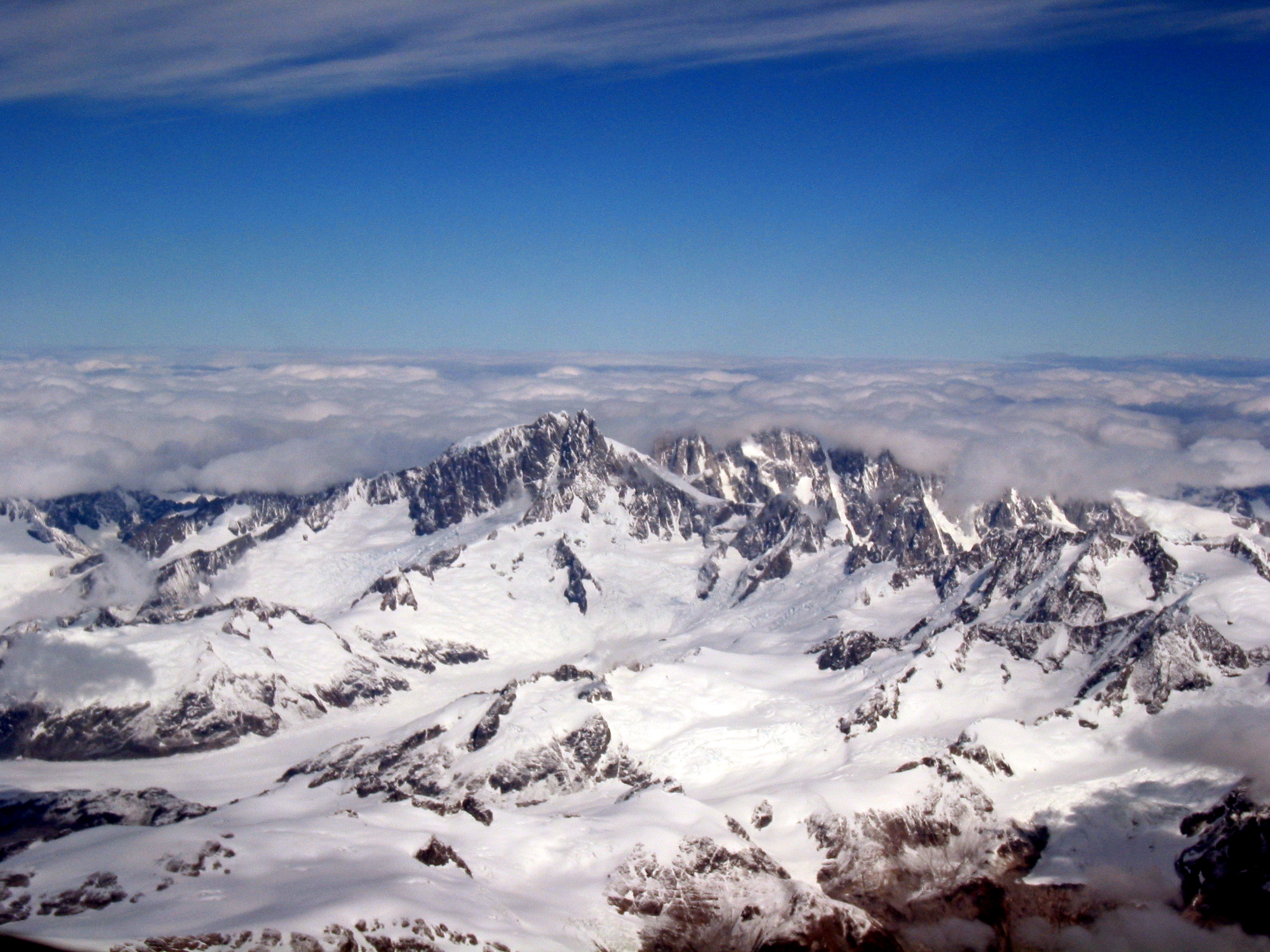
- View of Mt. Waddington from the south, Sept. 2006

Highest point
- Elevation: 4,019 m (13,186 ft)
- Prominence: 3,289 m (10,791 ft)
- Listing: World most prominent peaks 63rd; North America highest peaks 115th; North America prominent peaks 12th; North America isolated peaks 26th; Canada highest major peaks 19th
- Coordinates: 51°22′25″N 125°15′48″W

Naming
- Native name: xʷoʔoxʷ (Comox)

Geography
- Location within British Columbia
- Interactive map of Mount Waddington
- Country: Canada
- Province: British Columbia
- District: Range 2 Coast Land District
- Parent range: Waddington Range
- Topo map: NTS 92N6 Mount Waddington

Climbing
- First ascent: 1936 by Fritz Wiessner and William House
- Easiest route: Rock/ice climb

Mount Waddington, once known as Mystery Mountain, is the highest peak in the Coast Mountains of British Columbia, Canada. Although it is lower than Mount Fairweather and Mount Quincy Adams, which straddle the United States border between Alaska and British Columbia, Mount Waddington is the highest peak that lies entirely within British Columbia. It and the subrange which surround it, known as the Waddington Range, stand at the heart of the Pacific Ranges, a remote and extremely rugged set of mountains and river valleys.

From Waddington's 4,019 m (13,186 ft) fang to sea level at the heads of Bute and Knight Inlets is only about 32 kilometres (20 mi); across the 3,000-metre-deep (9,800 ft) gorges of the Homathko and the Klinaklini Rivers stand mountains almost as high, and icefields even vaster and whiter, only a few aerial miles away, with a maw deeper than the Grand Canyon, comparable in relief to the Himalayas (to which the terrain of British Columbia was compared by colonial-era travellers).

Mount Waddington is the namesake of the Mount Waddington Regional District, which takes in the seaward slope of the Waddington Range and the adjoining coastline and parts of northern Vancouver Island adjacent to Queen Charlotte Strait.

== Discovery and exploration by Europeans ==
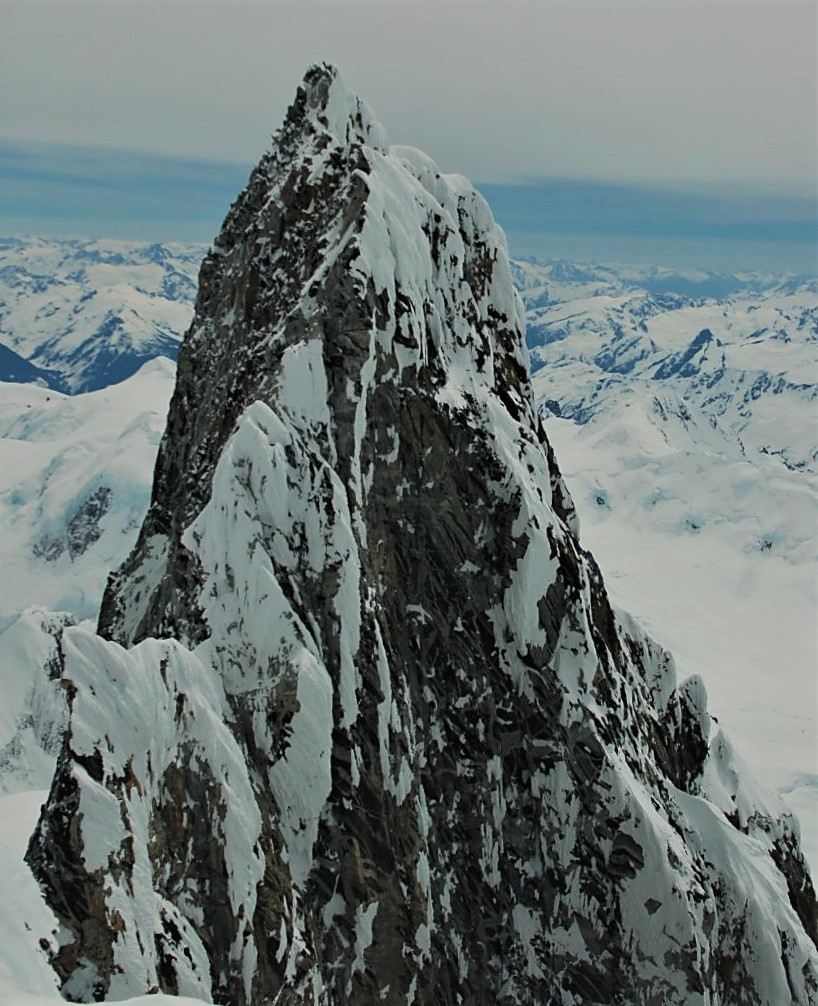
Summit of Mount Waddington as viewed from the northwest peak

In 1925, while on a trip to Mount Arrowsmith, Vancouver Island, Don and Phyllis Munday spotted what they believed to be a peak taller than Mount Robson, the then accepted tallest peak entirely within British Columbia. In the words of Don Munday, "The compass showed the alluring peak stood along a line passing a little east of Bute Inlet and perhaps 150 miles away, where blank spaces on the map left ample room for many nameless mountains." While there is debate as to whether the peak they saw was Mount Waddington (Don Munday observed that the feat is impossible), they almost certainly saw a peak in the Waddington Range, and this led the Mundays to explore that area.

Over the next decade, the Mundays mounted several expeditions into the area in an attempt to climb it. Known to them as "The Mystery Mountain", in 1927 the height was measured at 13,260 feet (4,040 m) by triangulation; they reached the lower, north-west, summit on 8 July 1928, deeming the main summit too risky. On their recommendation the Geographical Names Board of Canada named the peak Mount Waddington after Alfred Waddington who was a proponent of a road route, known as Waddington's Road, and again later the same for a railway, via the Homathko River valley and Bute Inlet, which would connect to Vancouver Island via Seymour Narrows.

In the summer of 1934, two expeditions attempted to climb the mountain. The first expedition, made up of climbers from Winnipeg, made their attempt on the northwestern flank which had not been explored by the Mundays. After crossing Tatlayoko Lake and making their way down the Homathko River, they then spent two days constructing a bridge over Nude Creek before reaching the Tiedemann Glacier on June 23. It took them three days to reach the shoulder of Mt. Waddington at 3,200 m (10,500 ft). They attempted the summit on June 28 but poor weather and route conditions on the final tower forced them to retreat, 180 m (590 ft) from the top. The second expedition, consisting of climbers Neal Carter, Alan Lambert, Alec Dalgleish and Eric Brooks from British Columbia, made their attempt from the southeast. On June 23, they established their base camp on the Franklin Glacier. The ascent abruptly ended three days later when Dalgleish fell to his death from the southeast ridge.

In 1935, a group of climbers from the Sierra Club of California made three attempts from their base camp at the Dais Glacier. The group failed in two attempts on the south face due to stormy conditions, poor route conditions and falling ice. Two climbers succeeded in reaching the northwest summit (first climbed by the Mundays) on a third attempt but proceeded no further.

== First ascent ==
On July 4, 1936, Fritz Wiessner, Bill House, Elizabeth Woolsey and Alan Willcox reached the head of the Knight Inlet. For the next twelve days they ferried loads to their base camp at Icefall Point on the Dais Glacier. While on the glacier, they were joined by another expedition led by members of the British Columbia Mountaineering Club and the Sierra Club. Wiessner and House agreed to allow the others a first chance at the summit but this group failed to find a route up the south face.

On July 20, Wiessner and House first attempted the line of a great couloir that comes directly down between the main summit tower and the northwest peak. It was an excellent line for quickly ascending but they were unable to traverse onto the south face proper due to poor rock conditions and were forced to retreat to base camp. By 3 am the next morning they were already climbing up a couloir to the right of the face. Good weather the past few days had cleared most of the snow away from the ledges making for good climbing conditions. Following the left branch of the couloir, they reached a snow patch in the middle of the face. The final 1,000 ft (300 m) of the south face then presented a fierce hurdle of "sheer forbidding-looking rocks" as noted by Wiessner. While Wiessner initially started in boots, he quickly changed to rope-soled shoes and gave his ice axe and extra rope to House. Wiessner led several pitches up technically difficult rock including several overhangs. After traversing east across the face they rested on a ledge just below the southeastern ridge, a full 9 hours since leaving the snow patch on the south face. After climbing a short chimney they finally reached the small snowy mass at the top, 13 hours after their start in base camp. They aborted their earlier plan of descending the shorter north face and retraced their ascent line, reaching their tent on the Dais Glacier at 2 am. The ascent to the summit and back to base camp had taken over 23 hours.

== Notable ascents ==
- 1936 South Face FA by Fritz Wiessner and Bill House.
- 1942 South Face 2nd ascent by Helmut and Fred Beckey.
- 1960 Bravo Glacier ascent by Elfrida Pigou who did not summit after being killed by an avalanche.
- 1977 South Face variation FA of route, 3rd ascent of south face by Jack Tackle and Kenneth Currens.
- 2012 Flavelle-Lane Route First solo ascent of the peak by Colin Haley.
- 2019 The first complete traverse of the West Ridge by Simon Richardson and Ian Welsted who completed a 12km traverse of Mount Waddington, starting from Fury Gap at its western end, crossing both the north-west and main summits and finishing at Rainy Knob on the eastern side of the mountain.

== Climate ==
The Waddington Range massif is known for fierce as well as unpredictable weather, located as it is at the brunt of the warm, wet winds that soak the British Columbia Coast, of which it is the highest point. Precipitation levels in the area of the peak are among the highest in the Coast Mountains. The peak has an ice cap climate (EF).

In 2010 and again in 2023, scientists successfully drilled ice cores at Combatant Col, the saddle between Mt. Waddington and Combatant Mountain, to obtain a climate and environmental record from the ice covering the last few hundred years. The 2023 core reached 219 m (719 ft) in depth, at or near the base of the ice.

Climate data for Mount Waddington Peak 1981-2010 (51.372 -125.262)
Month	Jan	Feb	Mar	Apr	May	Jun	Jul	Aug	Sep	Oct	Nov	Dec	Year
Mean daily maximum °C (°F)	−9.6 (14.7)	−10.4 (13.3)	−9.8 (14.4)	−8.5 (16.7)	−4.6 (23.7)	−2.1 (28.2)	1.0 (33.8)	1.7 (35.1)	−0.2 (31.6)	−4.8 (23.4)	−9.0 (15.8)	−9.9 (14.2)	−5.5 (22.1)
Daily mean °C (°F)	−12.6 (9.3)	−13.8 (7.2)	−13.6 (7.5)	−12.1 (10.2)	−8.1 (17.4)	−5.2 (22.6)	−2.1 (28.2)	−0.8 (30.6)	−2.3 (27.9)	−7.6 (18.3)	−12.2 (10.0)	−13.2 (8.2)	−8.6 (16.5)
Mean daily minimum °C (°F)	−15.6 (3.9)	−17.3 (0.9)	−17.3 (0.9)	−15.7 (3.7)	−11.7 (10.9)	−8.3 (17.1)	−5.1 (22.8)	−3.2 (26.2)	−4.3 (24.3)	−10.3 (13.5)	−15.4 (4.3)	−16.5 (2.3)	−11.7 (10.9)
Average precipitation mm (inches)	592 (23.3)	382 (15.0)	403 (15.9)	349 (13.7)	123 (4.8)	115 (4.5)	130 (5.1)	144 (5.7)	164 (6.5)	676 (26.6)	721 (28.4)	586 (23.1)	4,385 (172.6)
Source: http://www.climatewna.com/ClimateBC_Map.aspx

== Access ==
To reach Mount Waddington, one could take a long approach originating from Vancouver, with the bulk of the journey consisting of a long boat ride through the Strait of Georgia and the Knight Inlet, taking up to three days. A shorter water approach from Port McNeill, British Columbia, a northern community of Vancouver Island accessible by scheduled daily air connections and/or road from Victoria, reducing the water journey to less than a day may be undertaken.

Alternately trails and rough roads do exist from the Chilcotin side of the range, and may be accessed via BC Highway 20, from Williams Lake, departing from the main route to Bella Coola at Tatla Lake to connect to the Homathko River and up a side creek or glacier from there. This inland route is also the access route for the neighbouring Niut and Pantheon Ranges.

Mount Waddington is a popular destination among mountain climbers since it is the highest peak in the Coast Mountains and a challenging climb.

== See also ==
- List of mountain peaks of North America
  - Mountain peaks of Canada
    - Mountains of British Columbia
    - List of the most prominent summits of Canada
- Franklin Glacier Complex
