= Jagged Mountain (Colorado) =

Mountain in Colorado, United States

- Location within Colorado

Highest point
- Elevation: 13,830 ft (4,215 m)
- Prominence: 964 ft (294 m)
- Parent peak: Sunlight Peak
- Isolation: 1.42 mi (2.29 km)
- Coordinates: 37°38′44″N 107°35′02″W

Geography
- Location: San Juan County, Colorado, U.S.
- Parent range: San Juan Mountains, Needle Mountains
- Topo map(s): USGS 7.5' topographic map Storm King Peak, Colorado

Climbing
- First ascent: 5 members of the San Juan Mountaineers led by Dwight G. Lavender, August 1933
- Easiest route: North Face

Jagged Mountain is a high mountain summit in the Needle Mountains range of the Rocky Mountains of North America. The 13,830-foot (4,215 m) thirteener is located in the Weminuche Wilderness of San Juan National Forest, 12.2 miles (19.7 km) south-southeast (bearing 159°) of the Town of Silverton in San Juan County, Colorado, United States.

The first ascent of the peak was made from the south in August 1933 by a party of five members of the San Juan Mountaineers led by Dwight G. Lavender, who described it as “the most difficult peak yet ascended in the Colorado Rockies”. The following year Bill House and Elizabeth Woolsey put up a new route and found a descent down the north side of the peak. Their descent route is now the most commonly used route on the peak.

== See also ==
- List of Colorado mountain ranges
- List of Colorado mountain summits
- List of Colorado 4000 meter prominent summits
- List of Colorado county high points
