= Walter Francis Willcox =

American mathematician

Walter F. Willcox
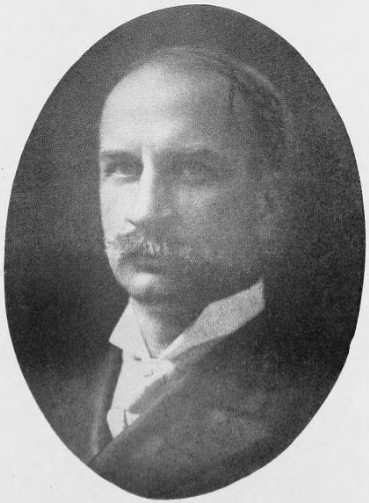
- Born: March 22, 1861; Reading, Massachusetts, US
- Died: October 30, 1964 (aged 103); Ithaca, New York, US
- Children: 1 daughter, 3 sons

Academic background
- Education: Amherst College; Columbia University
- Doctoral advisor: Richmond Mayo-Smith

Academic work
- Institutions: Cornell University
- Doctoral students: Allyn Abbott Young

Walter Francis Willcox (March 22, 1861 – October 30, 1964) was an American statistician. He was professor of economics at Cornell University. He founded the statistical research office in the U.S. Census Bureau.

== Early life and education ==
He was born in Reading, Massachusetts, to William Henry Willcox, a congregational minister, and Anne Holmes Goodenow. He was graduated from Phillips Academy, Andover, in 1880, from Amherst College in 1884 with an A.B., and in 1888 received an A.M. degree from Amherst. He received an LL.B degree (1887) and a Ph.D. (1891) from Columbia University. In 1906 he received an honorary LL.D. degree from Amherst.

== Life ==
Willcox was a Cornell University faculty member from 1891 to 1931. He was initially an instructor in philosophy but became a professor of economics at Cornell. He held the presidency of the American Statistical Association from 1911 to 1912 and of the American Economic Association in 1915.

He published The Divorce Problem, A Study in Statistics (1891; second edition, 1897). In his research on divorce, he estimated that one in 12 marriages in the United States ended in divorce in 1909 and that if trends continued, approximately one in two marriages would end in divorce.

He also published Supplementary Analysis and Derivative Tables, twelfth census (1906). He contributed the "Negroes in the United States" subsection to the "Negro" article in the 1911 Encyclopædia Britannica. (Note: The main section, by Thomas Athol Joyce, is of interest today for the insight it gives into racial prejudices of the time.) Between 1900 and 1910 he corresponded with Alfred H. Stone of Mississippi, a cotton farmer and public official who became a race theorist who attempted to give a scientific basis to prejudice and white superiority.

Willcox initiated the first statistics course at Cornell in 1892, one of the earliest university courses in statistics in the United States, and one among 16 universities with such courses in the 1890s. His research interest was in vital statistics. Emil Julius Gumbel described his body of work, collected in Studies in American Demography, as "the type of old-fashioned writings which will continue to be of value notwithstanding all progress achieved in mathematical statistics."

In 1911, Willcox claimed there would be "no children in the United States under five years of age" by the year 2020. Perpetuating ideas of race suicide, Willcox erroneously explained that the United States' birth rate meant that importing babies from France would be the only option for maintaining population levels.

After serving as one of five chief statisticians for the U.S. Census in 1900, Willcox proved that for any method of apportionment that involves rounding, a priority list can be created by dividing the rounding point into each state's population, by which each seat can be assigned in successive order based on each state's priority listings.

Willcox was an advocate for reducing the number of seats in the House of Representatives. He proposed to reduce one seat per year.

In 1947, Willcox served a short term as the president of the International Statistical Institute.

Willcox died in Ithaca, New York leaving three sons and one daughter. These were Mary Goodenow Willcox, Bertram Francis Willcox (1895-1987) who practiced law in New York before taking up a position at Cornell, Alan Willcox (1901-1978), who served as general counsel to the U.S. Department of Health, Education and Welfare, and William B. Willcox (1907-1985) who was an academic historian.

== Selected publications ==
- The Divorce Problem: A Study in Statistics (1891)
- Negro Criminality (1899)
- Studies in the American Race Problem (1908), with Alfred H. Stone
- The Need of Social Statistics as an Aid to the Courts (1913)
- International Migrations, Volume II: Interpretations (Editor), New York: National Bureau of Economic Research (1931).
- Studies in American Demography, Ithaca, New York: Cornell University Press (1940).
- Walter Francis Willcox papers, #14-10-504. Division of Rare and Manuscript Collections, Cornell University Library.
