= Theodore Salisbury Woolsey Jr. =

U.S. Forest Service employee, author, and academic

- Born: October 2, 1879
- Died: July 10, 1933 (aged 53)
- Children: 5, including Elizabeth Woolsey
- Father: Theodore Salisbury Woolsey
- Scientific career
- Workplaces: Yale University

Theodore Salisbury Woolsey Jr. (October 2, 1879 – July 10, 1933) was a United States Forest Service employee, forestry researcher, professor at Yale University and author of books and articles related to forestry and forest regulation.

== Early life ==
Woolsey was the son of the legal scholar Theodore Salisbury Woolsey, and grandson of Yale University president Theodore Dwight Woolsey.

== World War I ==
In 1917 Woolsey was offered the position of Major in the U.S. Army on the staff of the 10th Engineers (Forestry), a unit organized to produce timber in France for the American military forces during the First World War. His duties with the 10th Engineers (later the 20th Engineers) included purchasing standing timber to be manufactured for the use of the American Expeditionary Forces in Europe.

== Afterwards ==
After the war, Woolsey returned to Connecticut and worked as a consulting forester, a lecturer at Yale's forestry school, as well as with several national forestry organizations and conservation groups.

== Family life ==
Theodore Woolsey Jr. married Ruby Hilsman Pickett of Dawson, Georgia, on March 15, 1908. They had five daughters, two of whom were born outside the United States in Switzerland and France, respectively. In his later years his family resided in New Haven, Connecticut, where he died by a self-inflicted gunshot on July 10, 1933.

Mount Woolsey in Wyoming is named after Theodore Woolsey, the first recorded ascent was made a few days after Woolsey's death, the party who made that ascent had included Woolsey's daughter Elizabeth but on hearing of her father's unexpected death she left to return to New Haven. The name Mount Woolsey was formally approved in 1961.
