= Fritz Wiessner =

German free climber

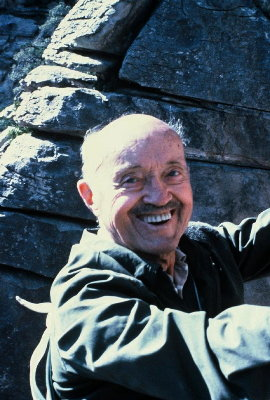
- Wiessner, age 86, on the Rupley Towers, Mount Lemmon, Arizona
- Born: February 26, 1900; Dresden, Germany
- Died: July 3, 1988 (aged 88)
- Citizenship: U.S. (after 1935)
- Known for: Pioneer of free climbing
- Spouse: Muriel Schoonmaker
- Children: 2

Fritz Wiessner (February 26, 1900 – July 3, 1988) was a German American pioneer of free climbing. Born in Dresden, Germany, he immigrated to New York City in 1929 and became a U.S. citizen in 1935. In 1939, he made one of the earliest attempts to conquer K2, one of the most difficult mountains in the world to climb.

== Early days ==
Wiessner started climbing with his father in the Austrian Alps before World War I. At the age of 12, he climbed the Zugspitze, the highest peak in Germany. In the 1920s, he established hard climbing routes in Saxony and the Dolomites that have a present-day difficulty rating of up to 5.11. That was at a time when the hardest free climbing grade in the United States was 5.7. At the age of 25, he made a first ascent of the Fleischbank in Tyrol, which was proclaimed the hardest rock climb done at that time.

Wiessner was 5 ft 6 in (168 cm) tall, slope-shouldered and stocky. He had a wide and friendly grin and his speciality was wide crack, or off-width, climbing, a technique that demands both technical mastery and uncommon strength.

== A new standard ==
In 1931, Wiessner made contact with members of the American Alpine Club and immediately set a new standard in American rock climbing. Across North America, he established a substantial list of first ascents at such climbing areas as Ragged Mountain (Connecticut); Cannon Mountain (New Hampshire); Wallface Mountain, New York Adirondack Mountains; Mount Rushmore National Memorial, South Dakota; Devils Tower, Wyoming (the first free ascent); and Mount Waddington, British Columbia.

In 1935, while climbing at Breakneck Ridge on the Hudson River, Wiessner spotted the gleaming white quartzite cliffs of the Shawangunks in the distance. The following weekend he set off in search of the tantalizing cliffs and immediately set about climbing the highest point in the area, a cliff now known as Millbrook mountain. Along with John and Peggy Navas, he established a route now named Old Route 5.5, the first recorded technical rock climb in the Shawangunks, and in doing so helped to establish the area as a mecca for rock climbers.

Wiessner, often in partnership with fellow immigrant Hans Kraus, established numerous first ascents in the Gunks, including many climbs that are popular (and intimidating) to this day. Perhaps their best known combined effort is the very popular High Exposure buttress 5.6, which they first climbed in 1941 with a hemp rope and three soft iron pitons. Other notable Wiessner first ascents in the Gunks include: Gargoyle 5.5, High Traverse 5.5, White Pillar 5.7, Baby 5.6, Frogs Head 5.6; Gelsa 5.4, High Corner 5.7 and Yellow Ridge 5.7. In 1946, he led Minnie Belle, the first 5.8 in the Gunks.

In 1935, Wiessner established a climb in Connecticut called Vector. 5.8.

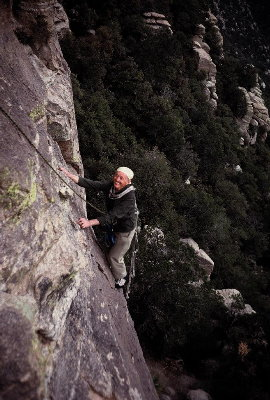
Fritz Wiessner, age 81, climbing on the Rupley Towers, Mount Lemmon, Arizona, in 1981

When rock climbing, Wiessner often paired himself with novices, and with women in particular. He always insisted on being the lead climber (in an era when a leader fall could easily prove disastrous for the entire party and the maxim of the day was "The leader must never fall"). After meeting Hans Kraus, he relaxed his "lead-climb only" rule (which Kraus had also adopted), and the two men climbed as equal partners.

== Major expeditions ==
=== Nanga Parbat (1932) ===
Wiessner had his first experience of climbing in the greater ranges when he was a member of the first German expedition to attempt the 8,126 m (26,660 ft) Nanga Parbat, led by Willy Merkl in 1932. Because the American, Rand Herron, and Wiessner (who became an American citizen the following year), were among the eight climbers it is sometimes referred to as the German-American expedition. Although the team were all strong climbers none had Himalayan experience, and poor planning (particularly an inadequate number of porters), coupled with bad weather, prevented progress far beyond the Rakhiot Peak northeast of Nanga Parbat's summit. Wiessner, Merkl and Fritz Bechtold reached the high point of the expedition at 7,000 m (23,000 ft). (Note: p.380)

=== Mount Waddington (1936) ===
In 1936 Wiessner led the party which made the first ascent of Mount Waddington, which, at the time, was Canada’s highest unclimbed peak at 4,019 m (13,186 ft)

On July 4, Wiessner, Bill House, Elizabeth Woolsey and Alan Willcox reached the head of the Knight Inlet. For the next twelve days they ferried loads to their base camp at Icefall Point on the Dais Glacier. While on the glacier, they were joined by another expedition led by members of the British Columbia Mountaineering Club and the Sierra Club. Wiessner's team agreed to allow the others a first chance at the summit but that group failed to find a route up the south face.

On July 20, Wiessner and House first attempted the line of a great couloir that comes directly down between the main summit tower and the northwest peak. It was an excellent line for quickly ascending but they were unable to traverse onto the south face proper due to poor rock conditions and were forced to retreat to base camp. By 3 am the next morning they were already climbing up a couloir to the right of the face. Good weather the past few days had cleared most of the snow away from the ledges making for good climbing conditions. Following the left branch of the couloir, they reached a snow patch in the middle of the face. The final 1,000 ft (300 m) of the south face then presented a fierce hurdle of "sheer forbidding-looking rocks" as noted by Wiessner. While Wiessner initially started in boots, he quickly changed to rope-soled shoes and gave his ice axe and extra rope to House. Wiessner led several pitches up technically difficult rock including several overhangs. After traversing east across the face they rested on a ledge just below the southeastern ridge, a full 9 hours since leaving the snow patch on the south face. After climbing a short chimney they finally reached the small snowy mass at the top, 13 hours after their start in base camp. They aborted their earlier plan of descending the shorter north face and retraced their ascent line, reaching their tent on the Dais Glacier at 2 am. The ascent to the summit and back to base camp had taken over 23 hours.

=== K2 expedition (1939) ===
In 1939, he led an ill-fated American expedition to K2, coming within 800 feet of the summit before having to turn back. Wiessner recounted that, although the difficulties of the climb had been passed and the remainder was straightforward, he turned back in deference to the wishes of his sherpa, Pasang Dawa Lama. (Note: p.219) The expedition was tainted by the loss of Dudley Wolfe, and initial accounts of the climb lay much of the blame on expedition leader Wiessner. In a 1956 article Wiessner instead directed criticism towards Jack Durrance. The controversy would be reignited after Durrance was convinced to release his personal expedition diary in 1989, which laid blame on the failings of both the deputy party leader Tony Cromwell and Wiessner.

No one came as close to the top of the mountain again until July 31, 1954, when the first ascent was achieved by Lino Lacedelli and Achille Compagnoni on the 1954 Italian Karakoram expedition.

== Non-climbing ==
During his first years in America, Wiessner founded a chemical company that specialized in waxes, including a widely used ski wax known as Wiesner's Wonder Wax. He successfully developed his company during the Great Depression of the 1930s.

Wiessner was also a proficient skier. He was reportedly disappointed that he was not allowed to fight for the U.S. in World War II, serving instead as a technical advisor to the 10th Mountain Division, and to the "equipment for cold climatic areas commission" of the office of the Quartermaster General of the United States Army in Washington, DC.

== Later years ==
Wiessner remained an active climber up into his eighties, often stunning onlookers in the Shawangunks by soloing his early routes. He loved to solo his climb Gargoyle at Skytop by the light of the full moon.

Once, when climbing with a much younger climber sometime in the mid-1970s, the younger climber led the first pitch, and confided to Wiessner that he had soloed the route earlier in the week. "Ah, you must vee climbing pretty goot!" Wiessner said. He then took the lead for the second pitch, putting in no protection—effectively soloing the pitch. When his partner reached the top, Fritz grinned impishly. "I must vee climbing pretty good too" Wiessner (then in his middle 70s) said. (The source for this anecdote is Guy Waterman).

== Personal ==
In 1945, he married Muriel Schoonmaker. In 1946, their son Andrew (Andy) was born. In 1947, their daughter Pauline (Polly) was born. Daughter and son both accompanied their father on many later expeditions and climbing trips. Muriel was a trusted climbing, scrambling, and skiing companion to Fritz for the rest of his life.

In 1952, the Wiessner family moved to Stowe, Vermont, where Fritz would live to the end of his days. Wiessner died after suffering a series of strokes at age 88. His family, including his wife Muriel and children Andrew and Pauline, honored his legacy by continuing to participate in outdoor activities. In recognition of his contributions, the Fritz Wiessner Woods was established as a memorial, and several climbing routes and areas have been named in his honor, ensuring that his influence on the sport endures.
