= Dudley Wolfe =

American mountaineer who died on K2 in 1939

- Dudley Wolfe, cropped from an official 1939 expedition group photograph
- Born: Dudley Francis Cecil Wolfe; February 6, 1896; New York, U.S.
- Died: c. July 30, 1939 (aged 43); K2 mountain
- Burial place: Godwin-Austen Glacier
- Other name: Dudley Wolfe Smith
- Occupations: Businessman, socialite
- Known for: Racing yacht owner/captain, 1939 American K2 expedition
- Spouse: Alice Blaine Damrosch (m. 1934; div. 1938)
- Children: none

Dudley Francis Cecil Wolfe (February 6, 1896 – July 30, 1939) was an American socialite. As a racing yacht owner and captain, he was the first person to race a sixty-foot yacht across the Atlantic, competing against much larger vessels. He was to inherit a large fortune from his maternal grandfather provided he changed his family name to "Smith", to which he agreed before reverting again. Wolfe became posthumously famous when he died on the 1939 American Karakoram expedition to K2 in controversial circumstances.

== Family background ==
Dudley Wolfe was born in New York on February 6, 1896, to Dudley Wolfe and Mabel Florence Wolfe (née Smith). His father had immigrated from England in 1888 and was a coffee importer. Claiming to have an aristocratic background, Wolfe senior mixed in New York high society telling entirely fictitious stories of his life tiger hunting in India and so forth.

His mother was the daughter of the immensely wealthy Benjamin Franklin Smith, (Note: Not to be confused with the Canadian Benjamin Franklin Smith.) who together with his three brothers had made their money in gold and silver mining in Colorado in the mid-19th century. They wisely sold at the height of the boom to move into real estate and railroads. When they returned to Maine in the 1880s they were thought to be worth $20 to $30 million (roughly $600 to $900 million in 2025). Benjamin's three brothers had no children so he was able to pass down the entire estate.

Wolfe's parents had married on October 15, 1892, and within a year his father's business was bankrupt. Despite these circumstances, the family lived a wealthy lifestyle thanks to a steady flow of cash from his mother's family. The couple had four children, three sons and a daughter – Dudley was the middle son. They had lavish educations at a series of boarding schools but none of the boys did well academically at school. Dudley was, however, good at sports – football, hockey, running, boating and hunting. Wolfe senior died in May 1908, and Mabel remarried, to a Nebraska businessman, Joseph Baldridge, and moved to Omaha. Eventually Wolfe's academic progress was so poor that he was not allowed to continue at Phillips Academy even though the headmaster recognized his "faithful, conscientious effort" and the goodwill he had engendered at the school.

== Wartime ==
In 1916, unable to find a satisfactory job, Wolfe tried to join the WWI war effort by applying to join several branches of the U.S. military but he was rejected because of poor eyesight and flat feet. He then put himself on the year-long waiting list for the French Foreign Legion, while in the meantime joining the Red Cross ambulance corps. In 1917 he sailed for Europe. In Liverpool by complete chance he met Lucien Wolf who, for the first time, told him of his father's true background. Lucien Wolf's brother, Dudley Wolf (before he changed his name to Wolfe), had been the son of a Bohemian Jew who escaped antisemitic uprisings in 1848 to become a tobacconist in London. Wolfe's grandmother, Céline Redlich, (Note: ODNB says Céline, Jordan says Cecili.) had come from Vienna. It is not clear whether the Smith side of his family ever knew about Dudley Wolf(e)'s true background.

Wolfe volunteered to work at various war fronts driving an ambulance, a slightly converted Model T Ford, under appalling conditions taking wounded soldiers back from the front to the field hospitals. Later joining the Italian Ambulance Service he was awarded the Italian Croce di Guerra and a campaign medal on the Italian front. After ten months' ambulance service, in October 1918 he was called up into the Foreign Legion but only served for a month up to the armistice – he was awarded the French Volunteer Medal and Campaign Medal. Phillips Academy now acclaimed him as having won more medals than any other former student.

== Inheritance ==
Wolfe stayed in Europe for a year before returning to Omaha to take part in running the family real estate business. This was not to his liking so every summer he went to Maine for yacht racing. In 1924 he left Omaha for good and that year he and his brothers were summoned to the vast Maine estate of their 94-year-old grandfather Smith. Grandfather Benjamin Smith's fortune was by then worth $70 to $100 million (roughly $1000 million to $1.5 billion in 2025) – reputedly he was the richest man in New England. By strong family tradition his fortune would normally have been inherited by Mabel's brother but he had died long ago after leaving one son, Clifford. Smith so strongly disapproved of Clifford that he announced that his heirs would be his three grandsons from Mabel. The proviso was that the three boys were required to change their family name to Smith and they agreed to do this legally. However, after a while Dudley felt the change of name had been disloyal to his father so he went to his grandfather to say he would change back and decline the inheritance. The elder Smith was impressed with this principled stance among the threesome and agreed to leave the share of his fortune to him anyway; grandfather Smith died in 1927.

== Sporting youth ==
Wolfe was gentle, cheerful and rather shy. He was very stockily built, strong and very determined. Although he was extremely wealthy he was not ostentatiously so in his manner although he had refined tastes. He owned a large estate on the coast of Maine, likened by his nephew to something from The Great Gatsby, with Rolls–Royces, large power boats and sailing yachts. In 1925 he was accepted by Harvard University despite not having the required academic qualifications – he eventually graduated in 1930. (Note: Harvard accepted candidates with lower qualifications if they were socially appropriate and paid cash.) He joined the elite unofficial "Dicey" chapter of Delta Kappa Epsilon and the "Owl Club", easily meeting the requirements of social status and wealth. Despite being ten years older than his colleagues he was popular and respected for his experiences of the war and his yachting successes.

Wolfe raced in a range of international and local yachting competitions. He raced his new yacht to win the Brooklyn Yacht Club's deep-sea Challenge Cup in 1925. In 1929 he commissioned a sixty-foot schooner, calling it Mohawk, and entered the transatlantic "King and Queen's Cup Classic" although no one previously had raced a sixty-foot yacht across the ocean. Captaining the vessel he came in second despite competing against yachts of one hundred feet and over. He also commissioned a racing cutter Highland Light in which he took part in the 1931 Fastnet Race.

Wolfe moved to live in Europe where he participated in climbing and skiing in the Alps, appointing guides to help him. He became an accomplished skier – he achieved a ski traverse across the Mont Blanc massif – but he struggled to master the technicalities of climbing.

== Marriage to Alice Damrosch ==
Wolfe met Alice Blaine Damrosch while skiing in St. Anton in the spring of 1934. They married in Geneva in October 1934. Alice, the eldest daughter of American conductor Walter Damrosch, had previously been married to Hall Pleasants Pennington but divorced in the late 1920s. She was an outdoor enthusiast and an accomplished skier, known for being the first woman to ski down the ice wall of Tuckerman Ravine.

Alice was deeply involved in skiing, organizing America's first Women's Olympic Ski team for the 1936 Winter Olympics in Garmisch-Partenkirchen. She was opposed to Nazism and used her influence to help Jewish friends in Austria during the Nazi regime, including physician Hans Kraus. By 1938, Wolfe decided he wanted to be single again and asked for a divorce. Despite the divorce, they continued to live together.

== K2 expedition ==
In early 1938, Wolfe and his wife held a party in their Fifth Avenue apartment in Manhattan to show friends photographic slides of their climbing and skiing activities in Europe. German-American mountaineer Fritz Wiessner had been invited, and he was on the lookout for wealthy mountaineers who might be willing to join in, and pay for, an expedition he was organising to attempt to climb K2, the second-highest mountain in the world. At the time, none of the 14 mountains over 8000 metres had been climbed. When Wiessner broached the subject with him, Wolfe was immediately hooked, despite his inexperience in climbing high mountains.

In early spring 1939 Wolfe tried and failed to reach the summits of Mont Blanc and Piz Palu, even with a guide. In March 1939, he met Wiessner in England where they bought climbing equipment to complement the sports clothes he had purchased in New York. The team boarded the SS Conte Biancamano in Genoa on March 29, 1939, to sail to Bombay.

At Srinigar, at the start of the expedition proper, Wolfe was dismayed to find out that Wiessner had not taken his advice to bring two-way radios. On the march in to K2 base camp, Wolfe coped as well as anyone else, but above Camp II he was noticeably slow and was criticised by some of his colleagues. Nevertheless, Wiessner favoured him over the other team members because he complained less and had good endurance. Wolfe did not take any sort of lead and reached each camp after it had already been established by other climbers. In this way he got further up the mountain than any of the Americans except Wiessner.

The team did not have bottled oxygen and, by Camp VIII at 25,300 feet (7,700 m) on July 14, Wolfe could get no higher. He waited there for seven days while Wiessner and Pasang Dawa Lama made their failed summit bid. Then, descending with the others to Camp VII at 24,700 feet (7,500 m), Wolfe waited another seven days in poor conditions while his two companions went down further to get help, but they found the lower camps deserted and the equipment removed, until they finally reached base camp. On July 29, during one of three attempts at rescue, three Sherpas managed to climb up to Wolfe, but his mental state was poor and he refused to go down, asking them to return the next day. After that, the Sherpas themselves also died on the mountain.

In the following years, there were questions whether Wiessner had abandoned Wolfe, why the expedition was poorly organized, why Wolfe had been allowed to climb so high, and whether the Sherpas should have been allowed to try to rescue him. Wolfe's brother, Clifford Warren Smith, considered taking legal action, but eventually decided to drop the case.

In 2002, skeletal remains were found on the Godwin-Austen Glacier at the foot of K2. Close by were vintage pieces of mountaineering equipment and a leather mitten marked "Wolfe". Wolfe was memorialized by inscribing an ancient dinner plate from amongst the debris with his name, and a plaque was made for the nearby Gilkey Memorial, which at that time had the names of 52 other climbers who had died on K2.

== See also ==
- List of solved missing person cases
