= Alan Willcox =

American lawyer (1901– 1978)

- Born: July 30, 1901; Akron, Ohio
- Died: April 27, 1978 (aged 76); Washington, D.C.
- Education: Cornell University; Harvard Law School
- Employer: U.S. Department of Health, Education and Welfare
- Children: 2
- Parent: Walter Francis Willcox

Alanson Work Willcox (July 30, 1901 – April 27, 1978) was an American lawyer who served as general counsel to the U.S. Department of Health, Education and Welfare.

Willcox was born in Akron Ohio, the son of statistician Walter Francis Willcox. He graduated from The Hill School in 1918, Cornell in 1922, and Harvard Law School in 1926. At Cornell, he was a member of Psi Upsilon.

He worked for the US Government during the Roosevelt and Truman years, from 1934-1953, and later returned to Washington (1961-1969) during the Kennedy/Johnson presidency. Initially he worked as a legal advisor for the Treasury Department but within a short time he started a longer term position with the Social Security Board which had recently been established to implement and operate the Social Security Act of 1935. During that period an important part of his role involved ensuring that the Social Security Act could be defended against constitutional challenges.

In the sixties he was appointed as general counsel to the U.S. Department of Health, Education and Welfare and was deeply involved in the Social Security Amendments of 1965 which resulted in creation of the Medicare program.

== Mountaineering ==
Well into his 40s he was an active climber and alpinist. His climbing partners included Bill House ( a key member of the 1938 American Karakoram expedition to K2), Elizabeth Woolsey and his brother William B. Willcox.

In addition to climbing in the European Alps, he joined Fritz Wiessner, Bill House and Elizabeth Woolsey in 1936 on an expedition that achieved the first ascent of Mount Waddington which, at the time, was Canada’s highest unclimbed peak at 4,019 m (13,186 ft). Wiessner and House reached the summit; Willcox and Woolsey remained at high camp as the backup pair.

Willcox died at his Washington, D.C. home in 1978, leaving his wife and their two sons.
