= Studies in American Demography =

1940 book by Walter F. Willcox

- Title page for Studies in American Demography (1940)
- Author: Walter F. Willcox
- Language: English
- Genre: Non-fiction
- Publisher: Cornell University Press
- Publication date: 1940
- Publication place: United States

Studies in American Demography is a 1940 book, written by Walter F. Willcox and published by Cornell University Press. It was one of the first publications to estimate the world population had exceeded 1 billion people in 1800.
