= Theodore Salisbury Woolsey =

American legal scholar

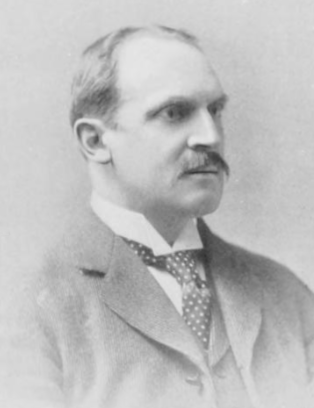
Theodore Salisbury Woolsey

Theodore Salisbury Woolsey (October 22, 1852 – April 24, 1929) was an American legal scholar who was professor of international law at Yale University.

He was born in New Haven, Connecticut. His father was Theodore Dwight Woolsey, President of Yale University. He graduated at Yale in 1872 and at Yale Law School (1876). In 1872 he was an initiate into The Skull and Bones Society.

After traveling in Europe, he was instructor in public law at Yale. From 1878 to 1911, he was professor of international law at Yale. He was one of the founders of the Yale Review and a frequent contributor to it. He wrote several essays which were collected under the title America's Foreign policy (1898), and he edited Woolsey's International Law and Pomeroy's International Law.

He was a member of the General Society of Colonial Wars.

== Personal life ==
Woolsey married Bostonian Annie Gardner Salisbury in 1877 and they had two sons. (One of these sons, Theodore Salisbury Woolsey Jr., was a forestry expert.) He retired in 1911 and died of pneumonia.
