= Operation Musk Ox =

1946 military operation by Canada

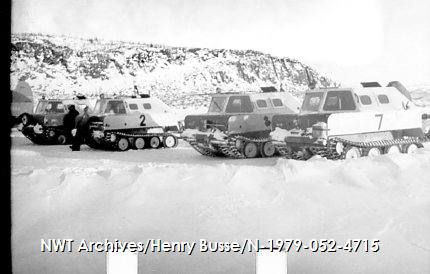
Tracked military snow machines (Penguins) on ice during RCAF Operation Muskox, Port Radium, Great Bear Lake, 1946.

Operation Musk Ox was an 81-day military exercise organized by the Canadian Army in 1946. It involved the 48 members of the Army driving 11 4½-ton Canadian-designed snowmobiles ("Penguins"). They were joined by three American observers in a smaller American-made snowmobile called a "Weasel" as well as an observer from the Royal Canadian Navy and a number of scientists. The Royal Canadian Air Force provided airdrops of supplies.

The main expedition, led by Patrick Douglas Baird, travelled 3,100 miles (5,000 km), starting from Churchill, Manitoba, first to Baker Lake, Northwest Territories where the number of vehicles was reduced to ten. From there, the group travelled to Denmark Bay on Victoria Island, then south to Kugluktuk, Port Radium, Norman Wells, Fort Simpson, Fort Nelson, and Grande Prairie, and then by rail to Edmonton.

Two soldiers were killed in an accidental fire incident in Churchill, just before the main group departed. Many of those on the expedition suffered from carbon monoxide poisoning because wind blew exhaust inside the snowmobiles. On April 4, a Port Radium local drowned while trying to help rescue one of the Penguin snowmobiles which had fallen through the ice on Great Bear Lake.

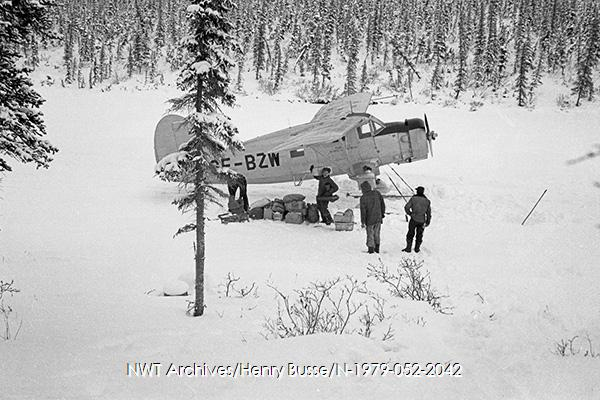
Operation Muskox, Eldorado Expedition - supplies being unloaded from 'Eldorado Mining & Outfitting' Norseman CF-BZW on skis in the bush near Port Radium

The mission demonstrated that it was highly unlikely that Soviet forces would attempt an overland invasion of North America through the Arctic.
