= Theodore Dwight Woolsey =

American jurist; President of Yale University

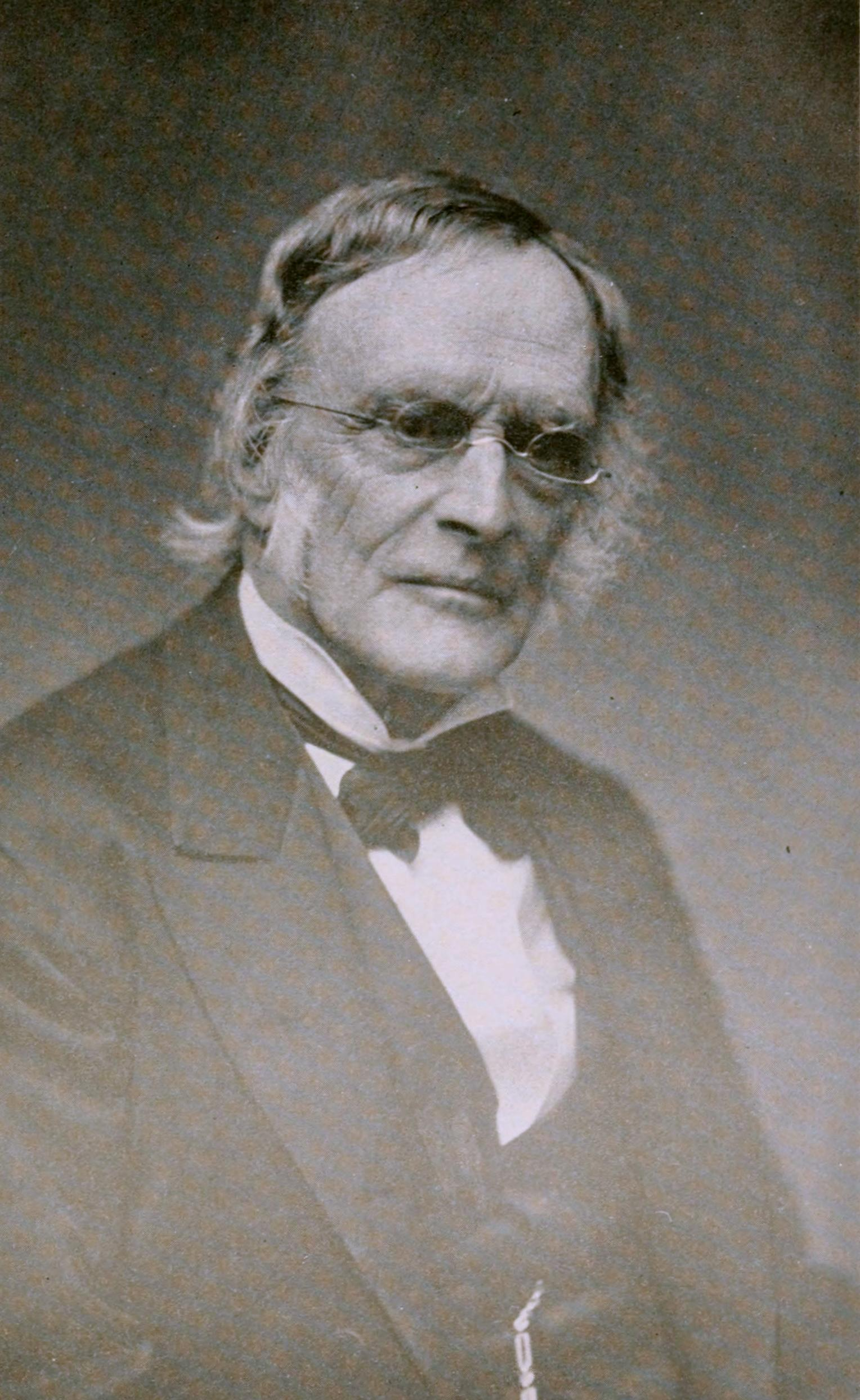

10th President of Yale University
- In office 1846–1871
- Preceded by: Jeremiah Day
- Succeeded by: Noah Porter

Personal details
- Born: October 31, 1801 New York City, New York, U.S.
- Died: July 1, 1889 (aged 87) New Haven, Connecticut, U.S.
- Education: Yale College

Theodore Dwight Woolsey (31 October 1801 – 1 July 1889) was an American academic, author and President of Yale College from 1846 through 1871.

== Biography ==
Theodore Dwight Woolsey was born 31 October 1801 in New York City. His mother was Elizabeth Dwight (1772–1813) and father was William Walton Woolsey (1766–1839). At Yale, he served as President of the literary and discussion society Brothers in Unity, and then graduated as valedictorian of his class from Yale College in 1820. He spent a year in legal study in Philadelphia, and two years of the study of theology at Princeton. For some time, Woolsey was a tutor at Yale, then went abroad to study Greek in Leipzig, Bonn, and Berlin. From 1831 to 1846, he was professor of Greek at Yale.

Woolsey's mother's brother Timothy Dwight (1752–1817) had been president of Yale 1795–1817. Jeremiah Day was the only president Yale had in between the family members.

Woolsey was elected an Associate Fellow of the American Academy of Arts and Sciences in 1845. After being chosen as president of Yale, he instructed students of history, political economy, political science, and especially international law. He resigned as president of Yale in 1871. After Noah Porter served as president, the office was back in the family as his cousin once removed Timothy Dwight V (1828–1916), was selected in 1886. In 1871, he was elected as a member to the American Philosophical Society.

During his 25 years as president, Yale advanced in wealth and influence and two new departments, the Scientific School and the School of Fine Arts, were begun. Woolsey was one of the founders of the New Englander, chairman of the American commission for the revision of the Authorized Version of the Bible, president of the World's Evangelical Alliance at its international meeting in New York, a lifelong member and at one time president of the American Oriental Society, and a regent of the Smithsonian Institution. Among Woolsey's writings and publications are these: Editions of the Alcestis of Euripides (1834), of the Antigone of Sophocles (1835), of the Prometheus of Æschylus (1837), of the Electra of Sophocles (1837), and of the Gorgias of Plato (1843); an edition of Lieber's Civil liberty and Self Government, and:

- Introduction to the study of International Law (1860, many times republished)
- Essays on Divorce and Divorce Legislation (1869)
- Religion of the Present and Future, a collections of sermons (1871)
- Political Science (1877)
- Communism and Socialism (1880)
- Helpful Thoughts for Young Men (1882)

== Family and legacy ==
Coat of Arms of Theodore Dwight Woolsey

Woolsey married twice and had a total of 13 children. On 5 September 1833, he married Martha Salisbury, who was born 30 November 1812 and died 3 November 1852. Their children were:

1. Edward Salisbury Woolsey was born 10 June 1834, but died from scarlet fever on 17 December 1843.
2. Elizabeth Woolsey was born 30 November 1835, but died in the same scarlet fever epidemic on the same day as her two brothers.
3. Agnes Woolsey was born 30 June 1838, married Edgar Laing Heermance (1833–1888), had three children and died in 1915.
4. William Walton Woolsey was born 12 June 1840, and died in the 1843 scarlet fever epidemic.
5. Laura Woolsey was born 22 June 1842 but died of typhoid fever on 23 March 1861.
6. Catherine Woolsey was born 17 January 1845 but died 7 June 1854.
7. Martha Woolsey was born 7 July 1847 but died 6 December 1870.*
8. Helen Woolsey was born 7 August 1849 but died 8 December 1870.*
9. Theodore Salisbury Woolsey was born 22 October 1852 and died 24 April 1929.

*Martha and Helen both travelled in late 1870 to Ottoman Palestine and fell ill with dysentery, succumbing to the disease.

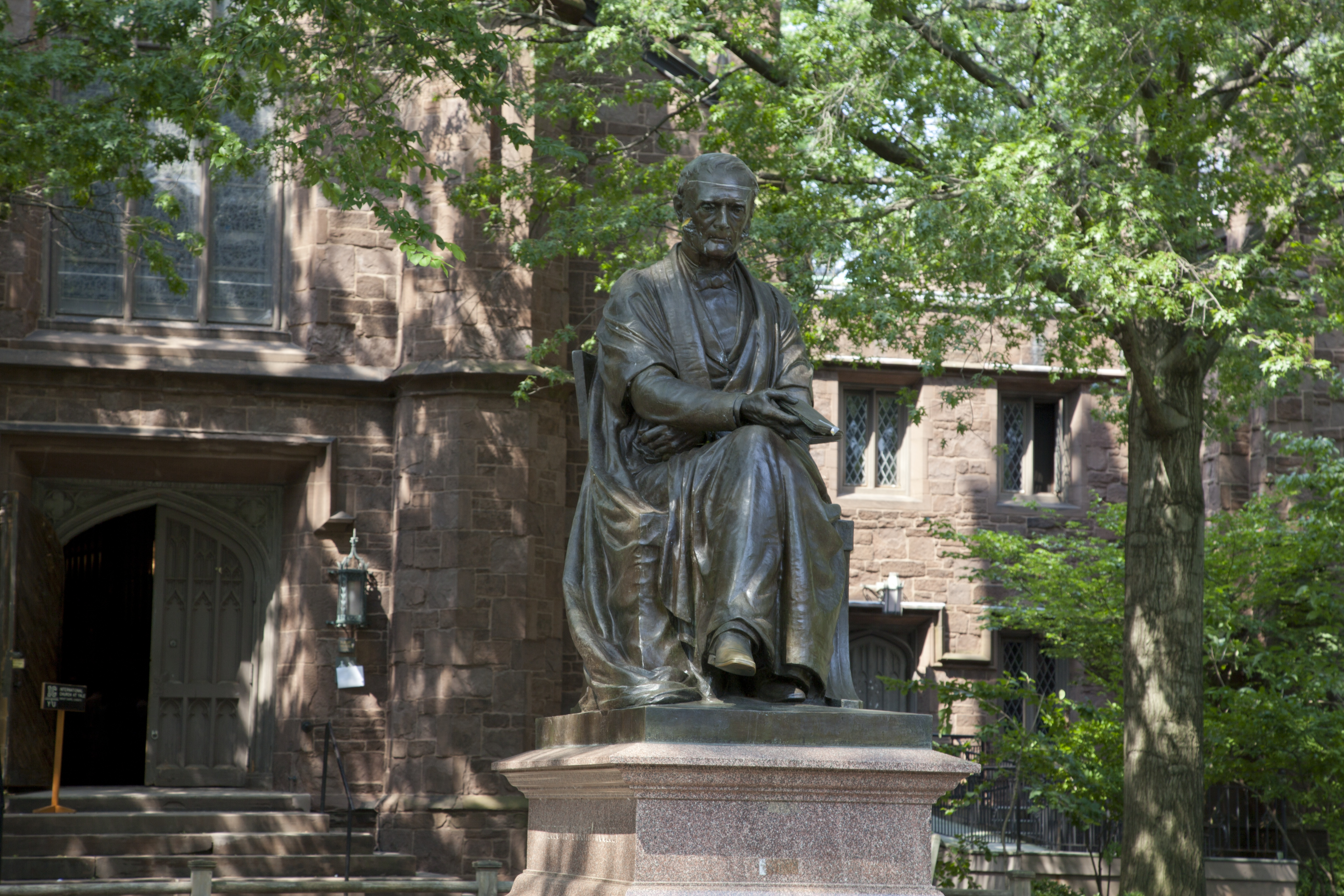
Theodore Dwight Woolsey statue on Yale's Old Campus

On 6 September 1854, Woolsey married Sarah Sears Prichard, who was born 3 March 1824 and died in 1900. Their children were:

1. Mary Pritchard Woolsey born 1 September 1855, married Alfred Terry Bacon and died in 1931.
2. John Muirson Woolsey was born 13 February 1858 but died from typhoid fever 13 March 1861.
3. George Woolsey was born 2 May 1861.
4. Edith Woolsey was born 2 July 1864.

Woolsey died 1 July 1889 in New Haven.

Woolsey was a descendant of George (Joris) Woolsey, one of the earliest settlers of New Amsterdam, and Thomas Cornell (settler).

Woolsey Hall at Yale, completed in 1901, and Woolsey Street in New Haven, Connecticut are named in his honor. The statue erected in Woolsey's memory, now displayed on Yale's Old Campus, has a golden toe from being rubbed for good luck.

== See also ==
- New England Dwight family

Academic offices
Preceded by Jeremiah Day	President of Yale College; 1846–1871	Succeeded by Noah Porter III
