= Elizabeth Woolsey =

American alpine skier (1908–1997)

Personal information
- Nationality: American
- Born: December 28, 1908 Albuquerque, New Mexico, United States
- Died: 11 January 1997 (aged 88) Wilson, Wyoming, United States
- Education: Vassar College
- Parent: Theodore Salisbury Woolsey Jr. (father)

Sport
- Sport: Alpine skiing

Elizabeth Davenport Woolsey (December 28, 1908 – January 11, 1997) was an American alpine skier. who competed in the women's combined event at the 1936 Winter Olympics.

== Skiing ==
Woolsey was motivated to take up skiing after being caught in an avalanche while climbing the Ober Gabelhorn in Zermatt, Switzerland. She was the US national alpine skiing women's champion in 1934 and was considered America’s best skier in 1936 when she competed in the winter olympics, captaining the women's team for the US.

In 1942 Woolsey settled near Jackson Hole, Wyoming, and founded the Trail Creek Ranch, which she opened as a ski center and dude ranch in 1946. She also worked as a journalist, writing for American Ski Annual and Ski Illustrated (which she also managed). Trail Creek Ranch became a base for the Olympic biathlon tryouts, Jackson Hole’s Ski Club’s Nordic program, and the Junior Nordic National Championships.

== Mountaineering ==
Woolsey was also an active mountaineer and it was whilst climbing in Wyoming with W. B. Willcox, Alan Willcox, their sister Mary and T. H. Rawles that she heard of her father's unexpected death in 1933. The party had earlier made the first recorded ascent of a number of peaks including Black Tooth Mountain but when Woolsey heard of her father's death she returned to the family home in New Haven; a few days later the remaining four members of the party made the first recorded ascent of another peak which they named Mount Woolsey in commemoration of Elizabeth Woolsey's father, Theodore. The name Mount Woolsey was formally approved in 1961.

She also climbed with other leading climbers from the US east coast including Fritz Wiessner and Bill House and was climbing with House (who was a key member of the 1938 American Karakoram expedition to K2) in Colorado in 1934.

Then in 1936, a few months after her participation in the winter olympics, she joined Wiessner, House and Alan Willcox on an expedition to attempt the first ascent of Mount Waddington, which, at the time, was Canada’s highest unclimbed peak.

In 1937 she and Wiessner narrowly missed making the first ascent of the north face of the Grand Teton; as they slept during the night before their attempt, Paul Petzoldt (a local mountain guide who Wiessner had spoken with earlier in the day), his brother Eldon and Jack Durrance started out on their own attempt, determined that the first ascent should be made by a local team.

== Legacy ==
In 1969 Woolsey was inducted into the US Ski and Snowboard Hall of Fame and in 1992 the Jackson Hole Ski & Snowboard Club started the Betty Woolsey Olympian Endowment in her honor.

Her biography was published in 1984.
