= Rope-soled shoe =

Footwear

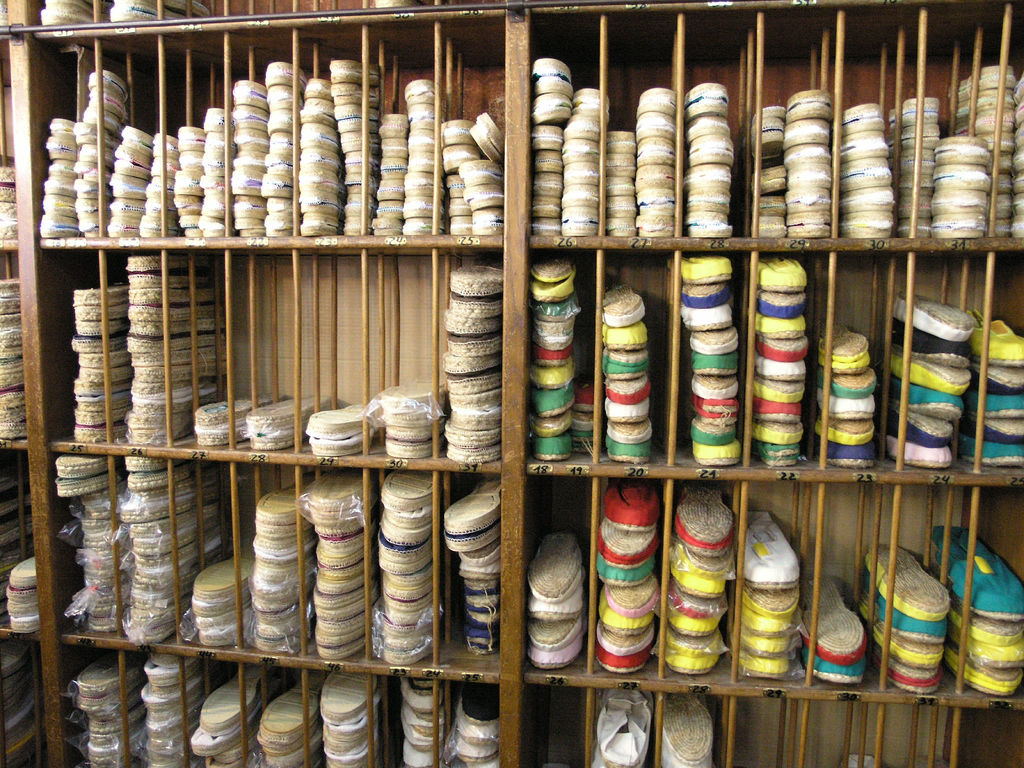
Espadrilles in a shop in Barcelona

Rope-soled shoes have soles (and possibly other parts) made from rope or rope fibres. They were formerly a cheap, disposable, hand-made item. However, the widely made espadrille comes in many styles and can include expensive fashion items.

== Espadrille ==
Espadrilles are traditional rope-soled shoes originating in the Basque Country, Catalonia and Aragon regions of Spain. They typically have a sandal-like form with woven straps or else a canvas upper. They were originally made from woven esparto (hence the name), but modern mass-produced shoes are more commonly made from the cheaper jute, giving the modern shoe a distinctive colour that is lighter than esparto.

Espadrilles are now made in many countries, including Spain, France, Italy, and many South American countries. Manufacturers also import pre-made rope soles from Bangladesh, a major exporter of jute, with the finishing and styling taking place in the importing country.

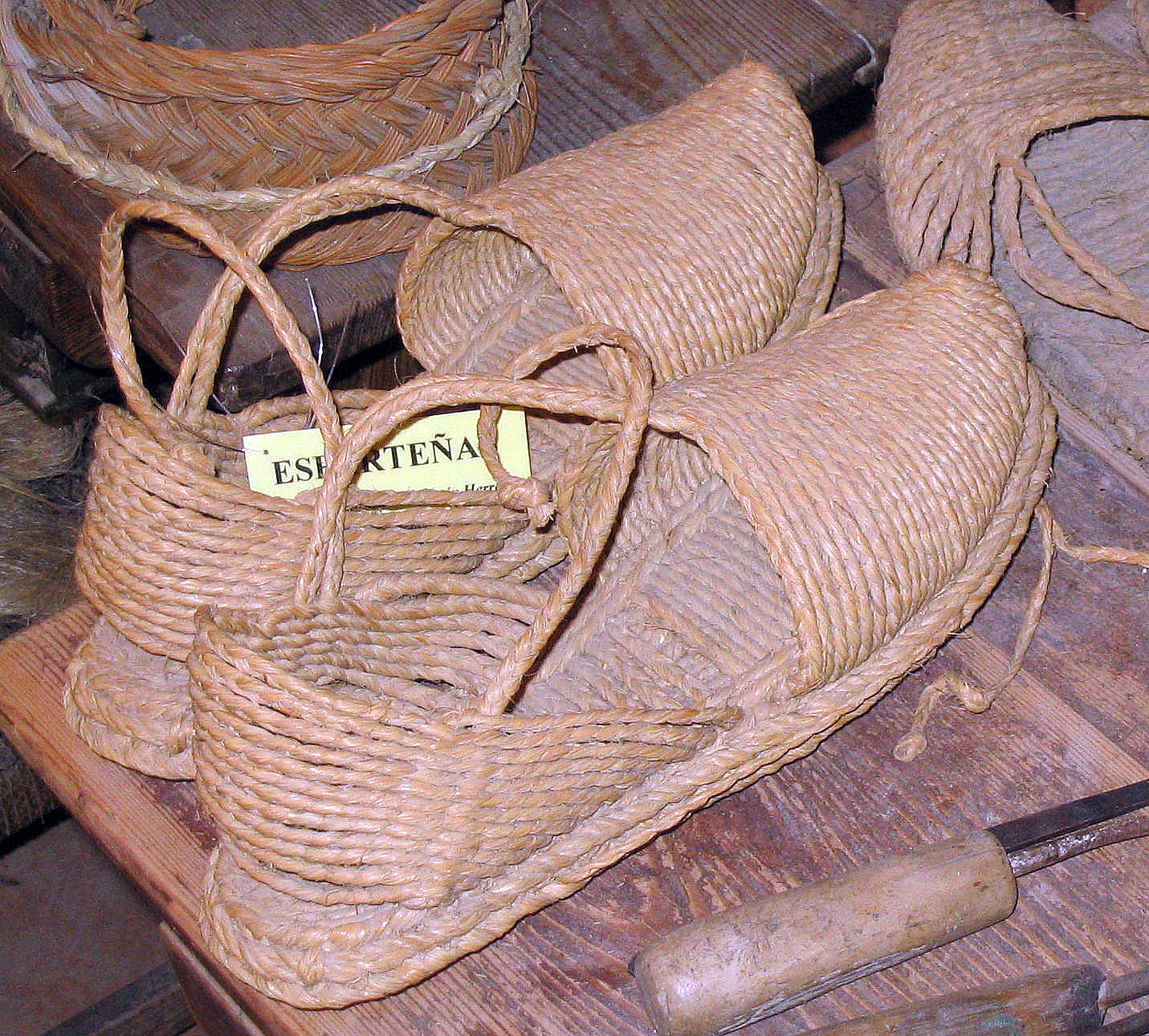
Traditional espadrilles made from esparto

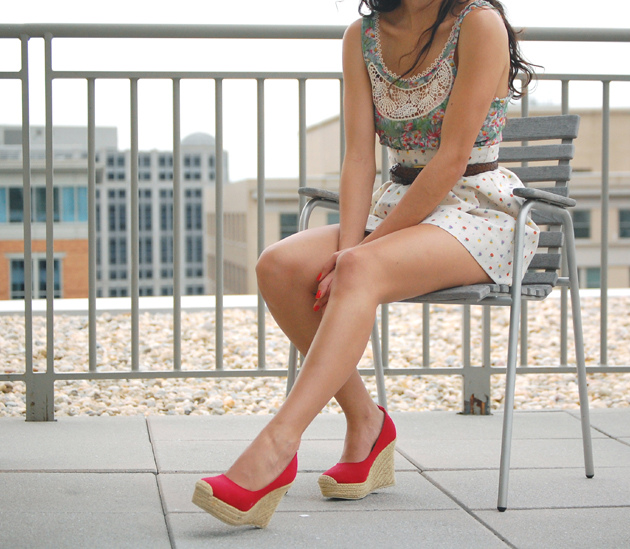
Woman wearing modern jute espadrilles showing jute's lighter colour

== Bast shoe ==
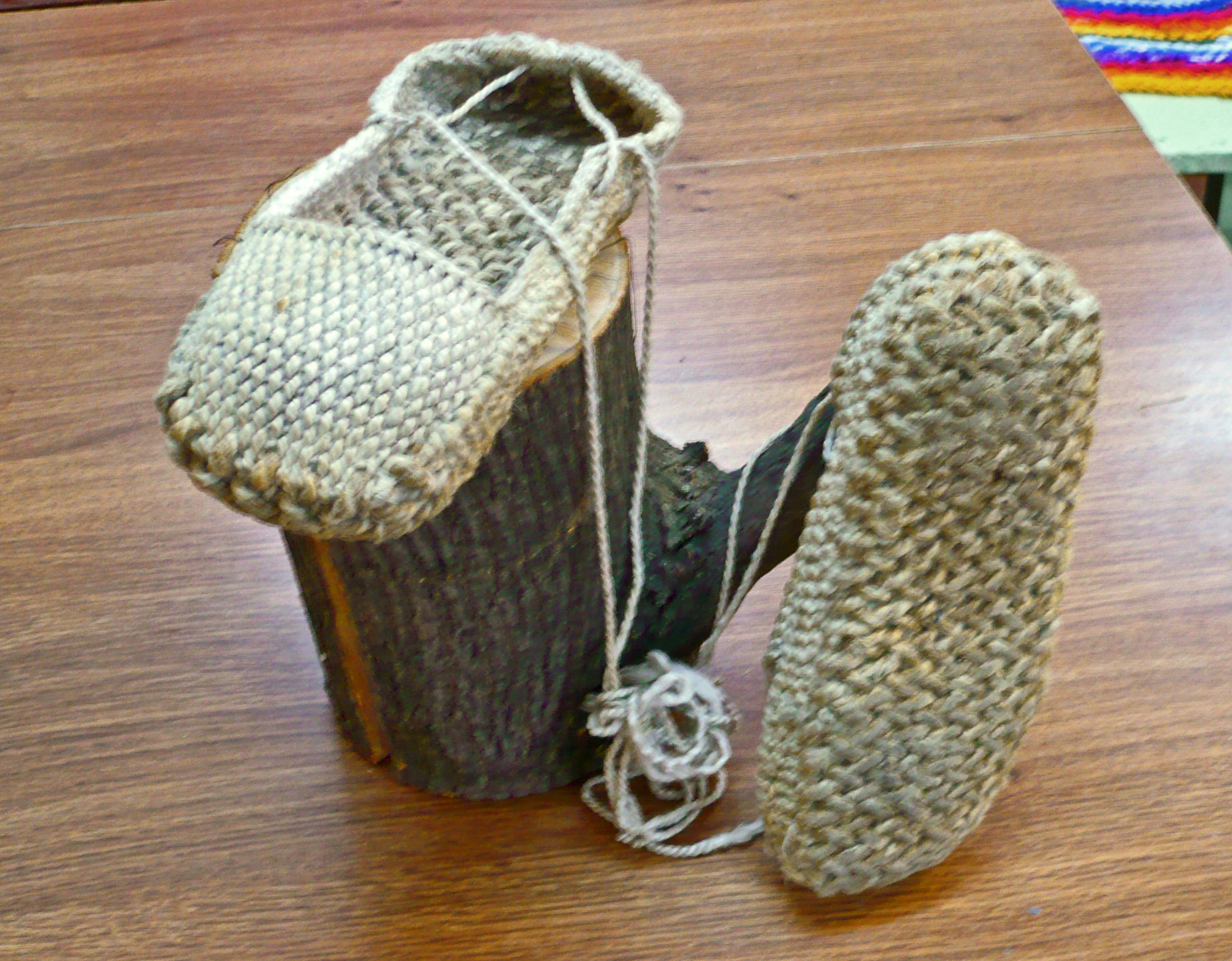
Bast shoes

Bast shoes are made from bast fibres. They were traditional shoes of the peoples of the taiga forests of northern Europe and Russia. Bast shoes were an item worn by the rural poor; leather was preferred in cities. Bast shoes were time-consuming to make. The bark from three or four saplings was soaked in a press for a long period. Despite this, the shoes were somewhat disposable, only lasting a week or so. Bast shoes were used until the mid-twentieth century. They did not always have a rope-like sole; it was common for bast soles to be crudely woven strips of bark.

== Waraji ==
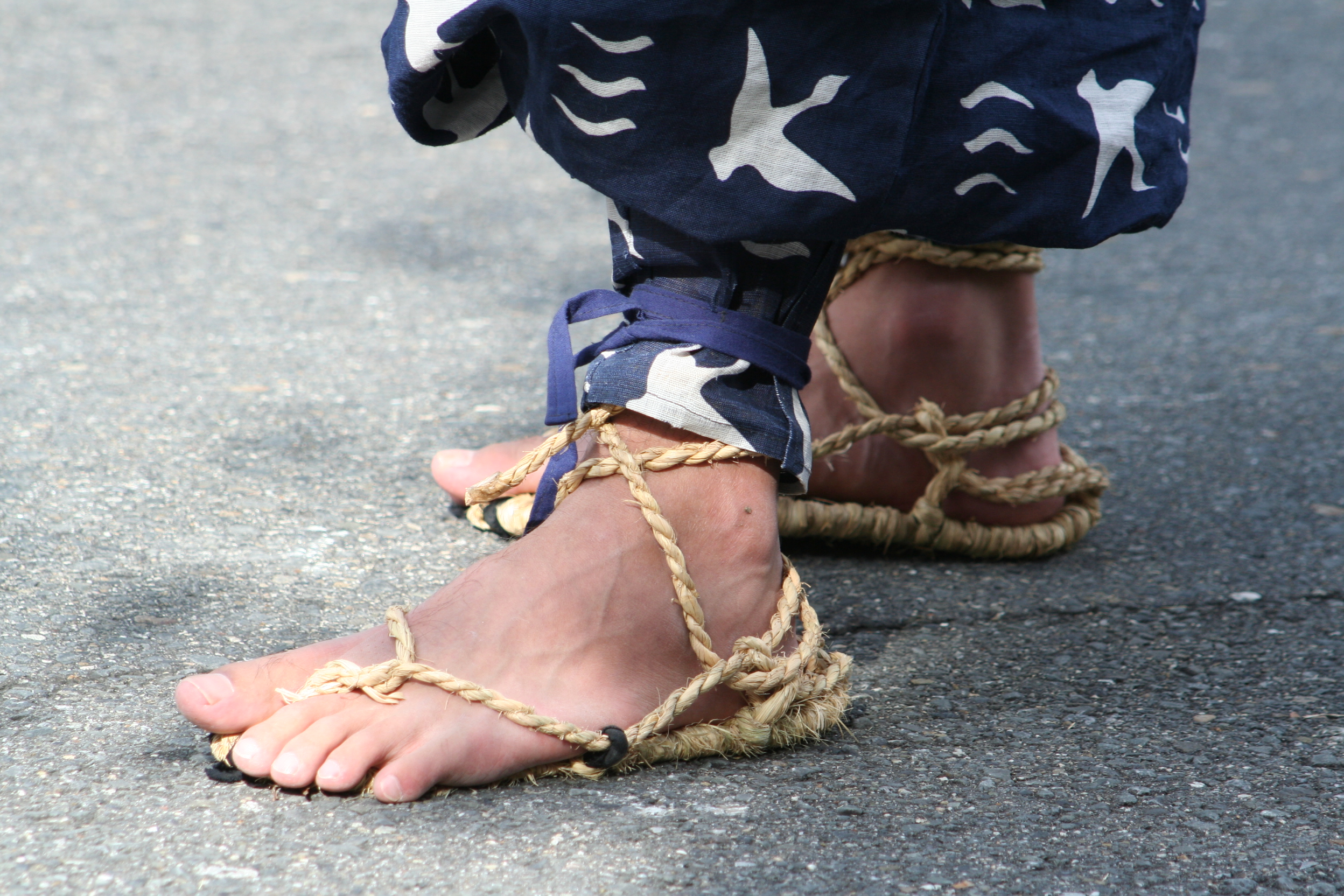
Waraji, worn at the 2009 Jidai Matsuri festival

Waraji are traditional Japanese shoes made from rope fibres (usually rice straw). They are cheap, disposable footwear not expected to last more than a day.

== Maritime use ==
Disposable working shoes very similar to espadrilles were at one time worn by sailors, particularly in hotter regions. Sailors would make their own shoes by hand while out at sea. They used a plaiting technique called sennit to create the soles and straps out of rope yarn and canvas, materials which were readily available on sailing ships. This practice was definitely still current in the 1940s and may have continued into the 1960s in some places.

== See also ==
- List of shoe styles
