= Spring Hill (Mobile, Alabama) =

- Neighborhood
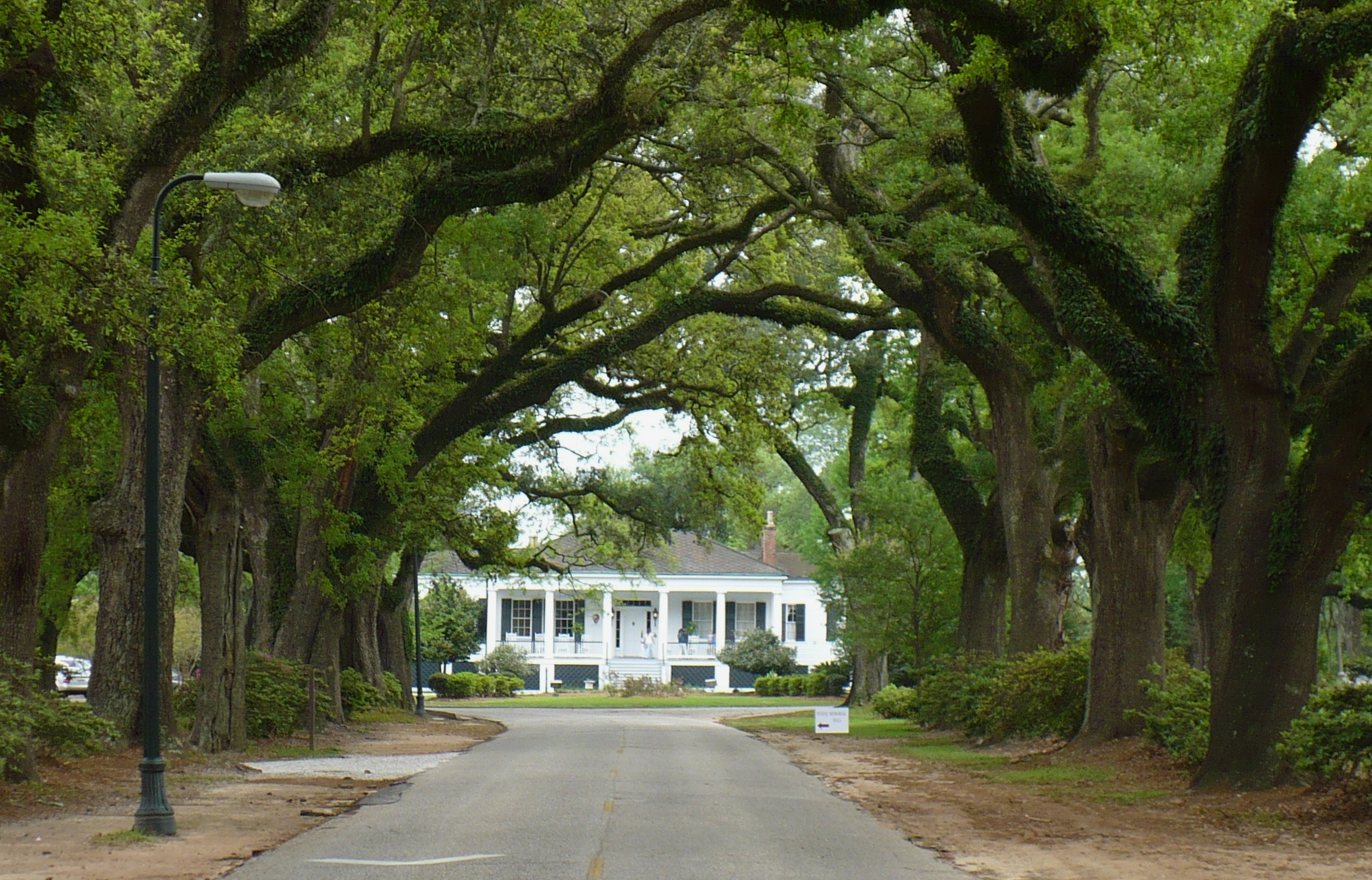
- Stewartfield (1850), one of several surviving antebellum summer houses, and its avenue of live oaks.

- Location within the state of Alabama
- Coordinates: 30.69852°N 88.13889°W
- Country: United States
- State: Alabama
- County: Mobile
- City: Mobile
- Elevation: 184 ft (56 m)
- Time zone: UTC-6 (Central (CST))
  - Summer (DST): UTC-5 (CDT)
- ZIP code: 36608
- Area code: Area code 251
- Website: The Village of Spring Hill

Spring Hill is a neighborhood of Mobile, in Mobile County, Alabama. Located on a tall broad hill 6 miles (10 km) to the west of downtown Mobile, it has one of the highest elevations in the area. Originally a summer retreat community, it was eventually encompassed and annexed by the City of Mobile after 1820. It gained its name from a number of natural springs at the site.

== History ==
Overlooking the surrounding landscape, Spring Hill began to be extensively settled in the first half of the 19th century. Its first European inhabitants were French Fur Traders and Blacksmiths. With Alabama statehood in 1819, during the 1820s, the city of Mobile and private developers bought what became Spring Hill. Between 1820 and 1827, the government of Mobile purchased three-fourths of section 14 from the U.S. Congress. In 1828 (Note: one source gives 1830, rather than 1828) William Robertson acquired all of section 13 (640 acres or 260 ha) and had a plat drawn up of 121 5-acre (2.0 ha) lots, sold at the rate of $100 per acre ($250/ha). Joshua Collins acquired 120 acres (49 ha) of another section and subdivided 80 acres (32 ha) of it into 10-acre (4.0 ha) lots. At the time, the majority of the land surrounding Mobile, outside of what is now downtown, was mosquito-infested swamp. With the city plagued by extreme humidity, heat, rain, and yellow fever epidemics during the warm months, people began to realize that the western hills outside of the city tended to remain relatively free of fever and disease. Many wealthy Mobilians soon built summer residences on lots in Spring Hill. The earliest houses of the 1830s and 1840s tended to be cottages, with many in the Gulf Coast cottage style. Large country houses in the Greek Revival style came to dominate by the 1850s and later.

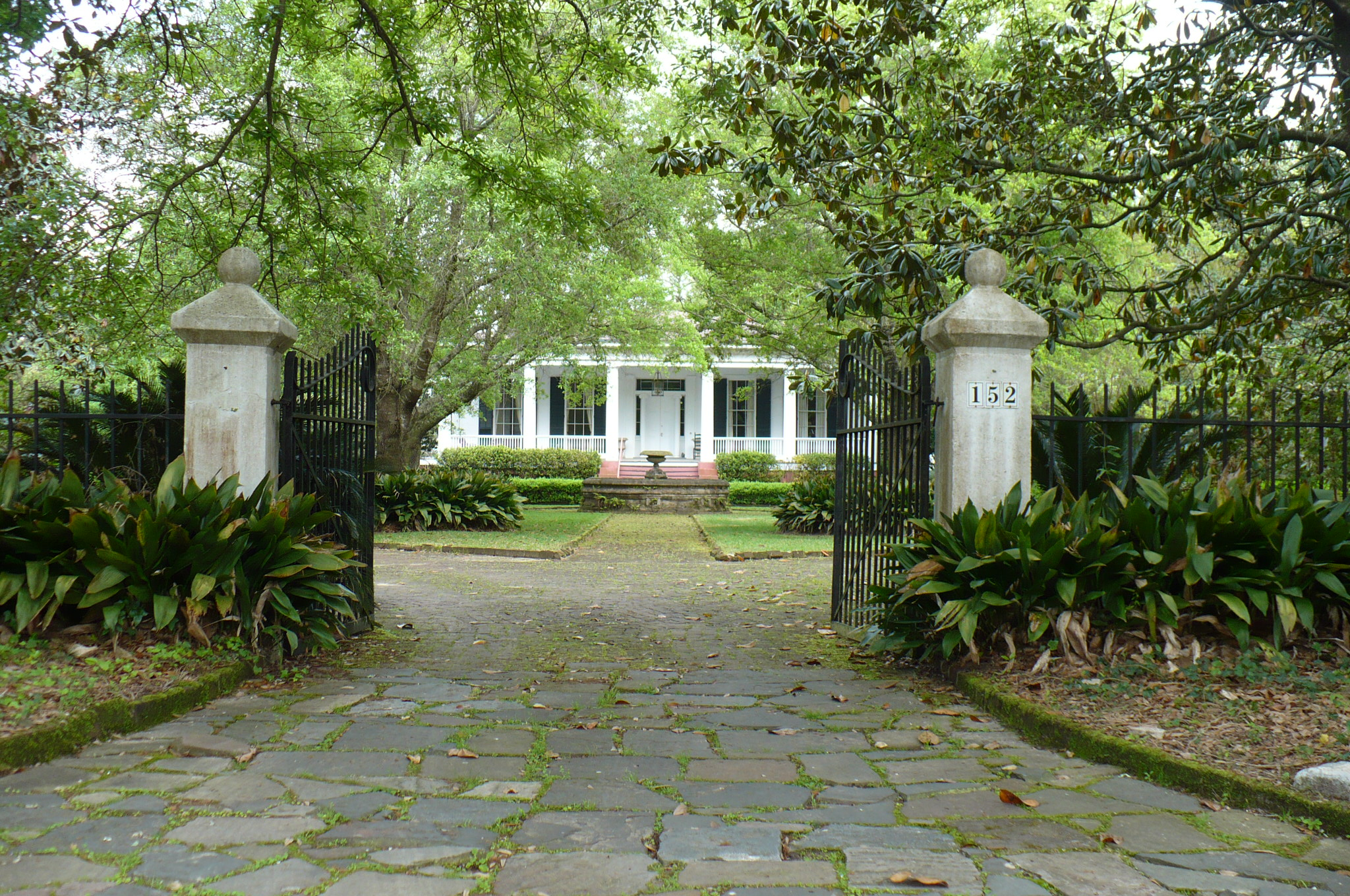
Marshall-Dixon House (1853), one of only two early houses that still retain their original 5-acre (2.0 ha) lots. Stewartfield is the other.

Michael Portier, the Roman Catholic Bishop of Mobile, purchased 300 acres (1.2 km^{2}) in Spring Hill in 1830 for the establishment of Spring Hill College, initially a Jesuit seminary and boarding school. It is the oldest institution of higher education in Alabama, the oldest Catholic college in the South and fifth oldest in the United States. In January 1832, construction began on an aqueduct of cast iron and wooden pipes to bring water into Mobile from a spring on the hill. It became the Mobile Aqueduct Company, the forerunner of what is today the Mobile Area Water and Sewer System.

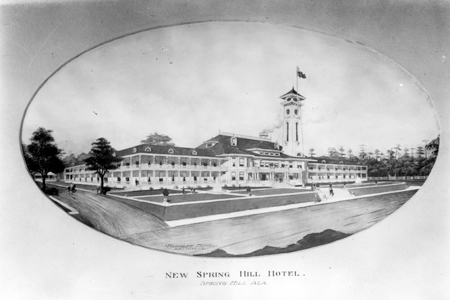
The "new" Spring Hill Hotel in the early 20th century. Located near the southeast corner of Old Shell Road and McGregor Avenue, it burned in 1918.

Transportation improvements began in 1839, when a horse-drawn wagonette line connected the Hill to downtown. A toll road, now known as Old Shell Road, was completed in 1850. It was built by laying down a bed of crushed oyster shells. The Spring Hill Railroad was established in 1860, but sometimes required beasts of burden to assist the steam locomotive up the steep incline to Spring Hill. With improved transportation, Spring Hill soon became home to summer retreat hotels. The Battle brothers established their Battle House Hotel in Mobile in 1852; then soon afterwards they built another at Spring Hill called the Spring Hill Inn. It sat amidst 20 acres (8.1 ha) on the south side of Old Shell Road and included a lake and bathing pavilion. The Spring Hill Hotel opened for business in 1886. 1893 saw the completion of an electric trolley line along Old Shell Road to the intersection of what is today McGregor Avenue. After being destroyed by fire during the first decade of the twentieth century, a new, larger Spring Hill Hotel, with a tall central tower, was built in its place. It too, was destroyed by fire in 1918. The Spring Hill Inn was also destroyed by fire around this time. With the popularity of retreat hotels diminished by this time, neither structure was rebuilt.

== Historic sites ==
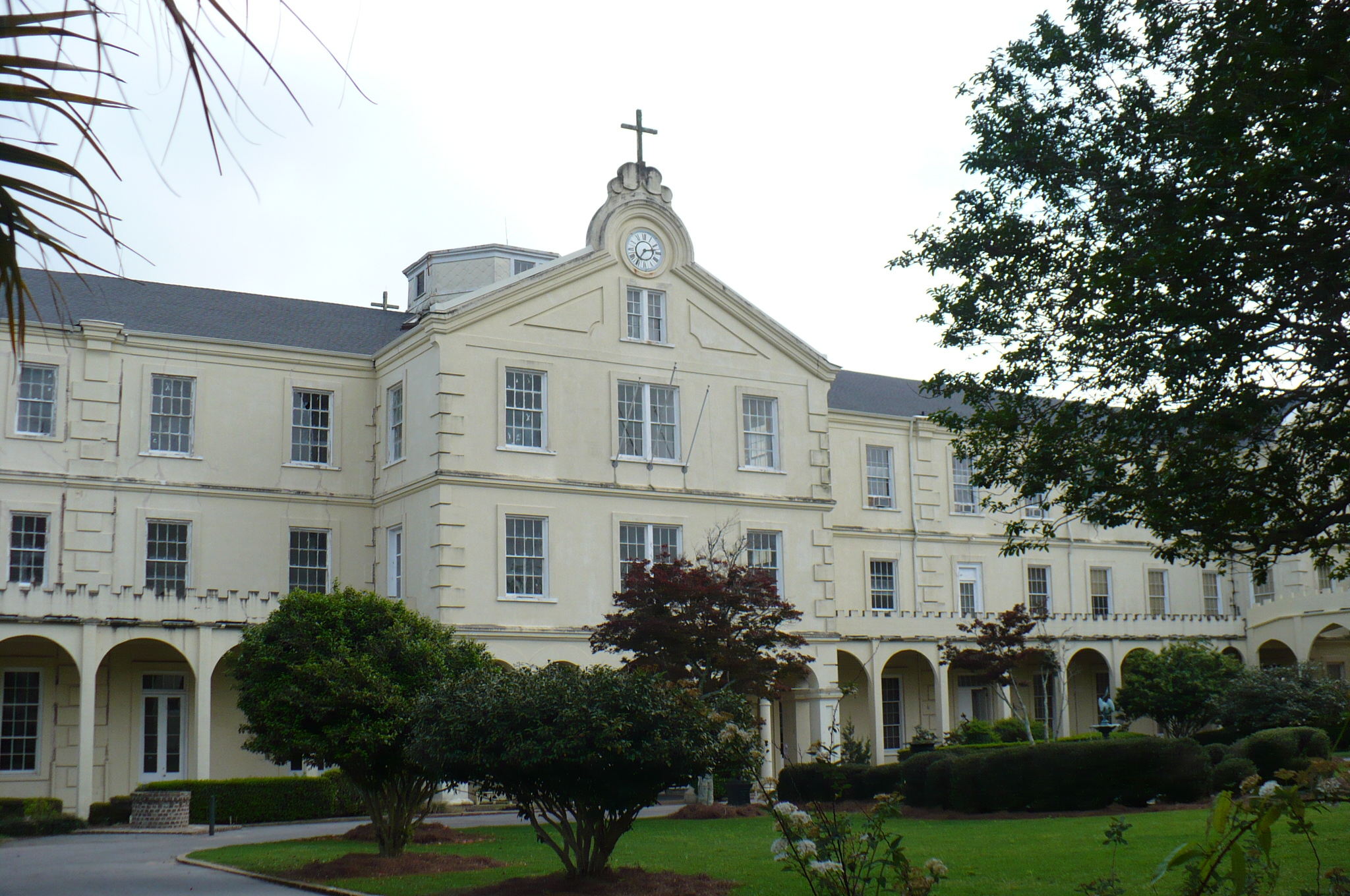
Lucey Administration Center (1869), part of the Spring Hill College Quadrangle, at Spring Hill College.

Spring Hill has a number of historic sites that are listed on the National Register of Historic Places. These include the Beal-Gaillard House (1836), Carolina Hall (1832), Center-Gaillard House (1829), Collins-Marston House (1832), Collins-Robinson House (1843), James Arthur Morrison House (1926), Pfau-Crichton Cottage (1862), Saint Paul's Episcopal Chapel (1859), the Sodality Chapel (1850), the Spring Hill College Quadrangle (1869–1910), and Stewartfield (1849).

== Geography ==
Spring Hill has an average elevation of 184 feet (56 m), with portions as high as 215 feet (66 m).
