= List of Pershing Rifles units =

Pershing Rifles is a military-oriented honor society for college-level students. Its units (chapters) are organized like the military, with regiments and companies. Most of its units went dormant between 1943 and 1946 because of World War II. Over time, some company numbers were used by more than one university or college. In the following list, active units are indicated in bold and inactive units are shown in italics.

Company (Note: Also includes units named Battery, Squadron, or Troop.)	Regiment or brigade	Charter date and range	Institution	Location	Status	Ref.
**A-1**	1st	1925	Ohio State University	Columbus, Ohio	Active	
**B-1**	1st		University of Dayton	Dayton, Ohio	Active	
**C-1**	1st		University of Kentucky	Lexington, Kentucky	Active	
D-1	1st	1934–c. 1943; 1961	University of Akron	Akron, Ohio	Reestablished	
**E-1**	1st	1934–1943; 1948	University of Cincinnati	Cincinnati, Ohio	Active	
F-1	1st		Ohio University	Athens, Ohio	Inactive	
**G-1**	1st		Xavier University	Cincinnati, Ohio	Active	
H-1	1st		West Virginia State University	Institute, West Virginia	Inactive	
H-1	1st	1948	University of Michigan	Ann Arbor, Michigan	Inactive	
**I-1**	1st	1949	Bowling Green State University	Bowling Green, Ohio	Active	
J-1	1st	2011	Wright State University	Dayton, Ohio	Inactive	
K-1	1st	1949	Kent State University	Kent, Ohio	Inactive	
**L-1**	1st	February 5, 1951	University of Toledo	Toledo, Ohio	Active	
**M-1**	1st	1952	John Carroll University	Cleveland, Ohio	Active	
N-1	1st		Marshall University	Huntington, West Virginia	Inactive	
O-1	1st	March 14, 2015	Cedarville University	Cedarville, Ohio	Inactive	
P-1	1st		Youngstown State University	Youngstown, Ohio	Inactive	
**Q-1**	1st	March 16, 2018	Miami University	Oxford, Ohio	Active	
R-1	1st	1955	Eastern Kentucky University	Richmond, Kentucky	Inactive	
S-1	1st	1970s	West Virginia University	Morgantown, West Virginia	Inactive	
T-1	1st	May 1957–xxxx ?; 2010	Central State University	Wilberforce, Ohio	Inactive	
**V-1**	1st	2026	Morehead State University	Morehead, Kentucky	Reestablished	
W-1	1st		Indiana University of Pennsylvania	Indiana, Pennsylvania	Inactive	
X-1	1st		Xavier University	Cincinnati, Ohio	Inactive	
Y-1	1st		PennWest Clarion	Clarion, Pennsylvania	Inactive	
Z-1	1st		Capital University	Columbus, Ohio	Inactive	
**A-2**	2nd	1892–1917; 19xx ?	University of Nebraska–Lincoln	Lincoln, Nebraska	Active	
A-7 (see A-7, W-2 and T-7)	2nd	1948	University of Missouri	Columbia, Missouri	Reestablished	
B-1	2nd	1932–1943 ?	University of Dayton	Dayton, Ohio	Inactive	
B-2	2nd	1929–1943 ?	State University of Iowa and Iowa State University	Iowa City, Iowa	Inactive	
B-7 (see B-2 and N-3)	2nd		Washington University in St. Louis	St. Louis, Missouri	Inactive	
C-1	2nd	1931–1943 ?	University of Kentucky	Lexington, Kentucky	Inactive	
C-2	2nd		University of Wisconsin–Madison	Madison, Wisconsin	Inactive	
D-2	2nd	1958	University of Wisconsin–Milwaukee	Milwaukee, Wisconsin	Inactive	
D-2 (see F-2)	2nd	1948	University of South Dakota	Vermillion, South Dakota	Inactive	
E-1	2nd	1934–1943 ?	University of Cincinnati	Cincinnati, Ohio	Inactive	
E-2	2nd	1930–1943 ?	University of Minnesota	Minneapolis, Minnesota	Inactive, Reassigned	
E-2	2nd		South Dakota School of Mines and Technology	Rapid City, South Dakota	Inactive	
F-2	2nd	1948	North Dakota State University	Fargo, North Dakota	Inactive, Reassigned	
F-2 (see D-2)	2nd		University of South Dakota	Vermillion, South Dakota	Inactive	
G-1	2nd	1950	Xavier University	Cincinnati, Ohio	Inactive	
G-2	2nd	1929–1943 ?	Iowa State University	Ames, Iowa	Inactive	
H-2	2nd	1933–1943 ?	Saint John's University	Collegeville, Minnesota	Inactive	
I-2	2nd	1956	Marquette University	Milwaukee, Wisconsin	Inactive	
K-2	2nd	1957	South Dakota State University	Brookings, South Dakota	Inactive, Reassigned	
K-2	2nd		Lincoln University	Jefferson City, Missouri	Inactive	
L-2	2nd		Ripon College	Ripon, Wisconsin	Inactive, Reassigned	
**L-2** (see L-7)	2nd	1963	Missouri State University	Springfield, Missouri	Active	
M-2	2nd		University of Wisconsin–Oshkosh	Oshkosh, Wisconsin	Inactive	
M-2	2nd		Kemper Military School	Boonville, Missouri	Inactive	
N-2	2nd		University of Wisconsin–Stevens Point	Stevens Point, Wisconsin	Inactive	
N-2	2nd	1980s	Minnesota State University, Mankato	Mankato, Minnesota	Inactive	
O-2	2nd		Northern Illinois University	DeKalb, Illinois	Inactive	
P-2	2nd		Creighton University	Omaha, Nebraska	Inactive	
R-1	2nd	1952	Eastern Kentucky University	Richmond, Kentucky	Inactive	
T-1	2nd	1957	Central State University	Wilberforce, Ohio	Inactiv	
W-2 (see A-7, A-7, and T-7)	2nd		University of Missouri	Columbia, Missouri	Inactive	
**A-1**	3rd	1924–1943 ?	Ohio State University	Columbus, Ohio	Active	
A-3	3rd	1929–1943; 19xx ?	Indiana University Bloomington	Bloomington, Indiana	Inactive	
B-3	3rd	1934–193x ?; February 4, 1937 – 1943; 19xx ?–August 1983; March 12, 2016	Western Kentucky University	Bowling Green, Kentucky	Inactive	
C-3	3rd	1951	University of Illinois Urbana-Champaign	Champaign, Illinois	Inactive	
**D-1**	3rd		University of Illinois Urbana-Champaign	Champaign, Illinois	Active	
D-3	3rd	1950	University of Michigan	Ann Arbor, Michigan	Inactive	
E-3	3rd	1951	Purdue University	Lafayette, Indiana	Inactive	
F-1	3rd	1937–1943 ?	Ohio University	Athens, Ohio	Inactive	
F-3	3rd	1948	University of Illinois Chicago	Chicago, Illinois	Inactive	
F-3	3rd	1948	West Virginia State University	Institute, West Virginia	Inactive	
G-3	3rd	1953	Murray State Teachers College	Murray, Kentucky	Inactive	
H-1	3rd	1947	West Virginia State University	Institute, West Virginia	Inactive	
H-3	3rd	1954	Western Michigan College of Education	Kalamazoo, Michigan	Inactive	
I-3	3rd	1954	DePaul University	Chicago, Illinois	Inactive	
K-3	3rd	1953	Wheaton College	Wheaton, Illinois	Inactive	
L-3	3rd	1956	Michigan State University	Lansing, Michigan	Inactive	
M-3	3rd		Southern Illinois University Carbondale	Carbondale, Illinois	Inactive	
N-1	3rd	1952	Marshall University	Huntington, West Virginia	Inactive	
N-3 (see B-2 and B-7)	3rd		Washington University in St. Louis	St. Louis, Missouri	Inactive	
S-1	3rd	1955	West Virginia University	Morgantown, West Virginia	Inactive	
A-4	4th	March 14, 1975	St. Augustine's University	Raleigh, North Carolina	Inactive	
A-4	4th	1927–1943; 1948	University of Tennessee	Knoxville, Tennessee	Reestablished	
A-4	4th		Presbyterian College	Clinton, South Carolina	Inactive	
B-4	4th	1930s–1943; 1948	University of Alabama	Tuscaloosa, Alabama	Inactive	
B-4	4th		Tennessee Tech	Crossville, Tennessee	Inactive	
**C-4**	4th	1939–1943; March 19, 1946	Clemson University	Clemson, South Carolina	Active	
D-4 (see D-6, D-7, and **D-17**)	4th	1930s–1943; 1950s	Louisiana State University	Baton Rouge, Louisiana	Reestablished	
D-4	4th		Wake Forest University	Winston-Salem, North Carolina	Inactive	
E-4	4th	1949	Virginia Tech	Blacksburg, Virginia	Inactive	
E-4	4th		Mercer University	Macon, Georgia	Inactive	
E-4	4th		Campbell College	Buies Creek, North Carolina	Inactive	
F-4	4th		Georgia Tech	Atlanta, Georgia	Inactive	
G-4	4th	1948	University of Florida	Gainesville, Florida	Inactive	
G-4	4th		Auburn University	Auburn, Alabama	Inactive	
H-4	4th	1961	Wofford College	Spartanburg, South Carolina	Inactive	
H-4	4th	March 13, 1972 – xxxx ?	Alabama A&M University	Huntsville, Alabama	Reestablished	(Note: Unit was originally in the 4th Regiment but was assigned to 6th Regiment.)
I-4	4th		Jacksonville State University	Jacksonville, Alabama	Inactive	
J-4	4th		University of North Alabama	Florence, Alabama	Inactive	(Note: Unit was chartered at Florence State University, now called University of North Alabama.)
**K-4**	4th	December 14, 1966	South Carolina State University	Orangeburg, South Carolina	Active	
K-4	4th		University of South Carolina	Columbia, South Carolina	Inactive	
**L-4**	4th	1953	North Carolina State University	Raleigh, North Carolina	Active	
M-4	4th		University of Tennessee at Chattanooga	Chattanooga, Tennessee	Inactive, Reassigned	
M-4	4th	1969	Appalachian State University	Boone, North Carolina	Inactive	
N-4	4th		North Carolina A&T State University	Greensboro, North Carolina	Inactive	
O-4 (see D-5)	4th		Virginia State University	Petersburg, Virginia	Inactive	
P-4 (see P-6)	4th		Tuskegee Institute	Tuskegee, Alabama	Reestablished	
P-6 (see P-4)	4th		Tuskegee Institute	Tuskegee, Alabama	Inactive	
Q-4	4th		University of Georgia	Athens, Georgia	Inactive	
R-4	4th	1958	East Tennessee State University	Johnson City, Tennessee	Inactive, Reassigned	
**R-4** (see C-15)	4th		Norfolk State University	Norfolk, Virginia	Active	
S-4	4th		Furman University	Greenville, South Carolina	Inactive	
T-4 (see **B-16**)	4th		Georgia State University	Atlanta, Georgia	Reestablished	
**U-4** (see D-15, D-15, and I-5)	4th	2000	Hampton University	Hampton, Virginia	Active	
V-4	4th	1958	Vanderbilt University	Nashville, Tennessee	Inactive	
W-4	4th	1962	Vanderbilt University	Nashville, Tennessee	Inactive	
**W-4**	4th		College of William & Mary	Williamsburg, Virginia	Active	
X-4	4th		Middle Tennessee State University	Murfreesboro, Tennessee	Inactive	
Y-4	4th	2000–2015	Christopher Newport University	Newport News, VA	Inactive	
Z-4	4th		University of North Carolina at Charlotte	Charlotte, North Carolina	Inactive	
A-5	5th	1930s–1943; 1948–xxxx ?	Syracuse University	Syracuse, New York	Inactive	
A-5	5th		Pennsylvania State University	Altoona, Pennsylvania	Inactive	(Note: Unit was previously the Headquarters of Platoon Ogontz.)
A-5	5th		Carnegie Institute of Technology	Pittsburgh, Pennsylvania	Inactive	
B-5 (see B-8)	5th	1932–1943 ?	Pennsylvania State University	University Park, Pennsylvania	Reestablished	
C-5 (see A-15 and **C-8** )	5th	1930s–1943; 1948	University of Maryland, College Park	College Park, Maryland	Inactive	
D-5	5th	1930s–1943; 1948	City College of New York	New York City, New York	Inactive, Reassigned	
D-5 (see O-4)	5th	1958	Virginia State University	Petersburg, Virginia	Inactive	(Note: Unit was the 5th Regiment, 3rd Battalion in 1958.)
E-5	5th	1930s–1943; 1948	Cornell University	Ithaca, New York	Inactive, Reassigned	
E-5	5th	1958	Virginia Tech	Blacksburg, Virginia	Inactive	
F-5	5th	1948	Lehigh University	Bethlehem, Pennsylvania	Inactive	
G-5	5th	1948	University of Pennsylvania	Philadelphia, Pennsylvania	Inactive	
H-5 (see **C-12**)	5th	April 20, 1948	Massachusetts Institute of Technology	Cambridge, Massachusetts	Reestablished, Reassigned	(Note: This is an Airborne company.)
H-5	5th		Washington & Jefferson College	Washington, Pennsylvania	Inactive	
I-5	5th		Indiana University of Pennsylvania	Indiana, Pennsylvania	Inactive	
I-5 (see D-15, D-15, and **U-4**)	5th		Hampton Institute	Hampton, Virginia	Reestablished	
K-5	5th		University of Pittsburgh	Pittsburgh, Pennsylvania	Inactive	(Note: Unit was the 5th Regiment, 1st Battalion from 1958 to 1959.)
K-5	5th	April 20, 1948	Fordham University	New York City, New York	Inactive	
?-5	5th	1948	New York University	New York City, New York	Inactive	
L-5	5th		Duquesne University	Pittsburgh, Pennsylvania	Inactive	
M-5	5th	1954	Bucknell University	Lewisburg, Pennsylvania	Inactive	
N-5	5th		Gettysburg College	Gettysburg, Pennsylvania	Inactive	
O-5	5th		Gannon College	Erie, Pennsylvania	Inactive	
P-5 (see E-8, E-15, and **T-8**)	5th	1952–late 1950s	Johns Hopkins University	Baltimore, Maryland	Reestablished	
Q-5 (see Q-15)	5th	November 25, 1952 – 1967	Pennsylvania Military College	Chester, Pennsylvania	Renamed	(Note: Unit was the 5th Regiment, 2nd Battalion from 1958 to 1959.)
R-5	5th	1953	University of Scranton	Scranton, Pennsylvania	Inactive	
S-5	5th	1958	George Washington University, Chapin Hall	Washington, D.C.	Inactive	
T-5	5th	1958	Loyola University Maryland	Baltimore, Maryland	Inactive	
V-5 (see H-15 and **J-8**)	5th	1954	Morgan State College	Baltimore, Maryland	Reestablished	(Note: Unit was the 5th Regiment, 3rd Battalion in 1959.)
W-5	5th	1958	Villanova University NROTC	Villanova, Pennsylvania	Inactive	
X-5	5th	1957	Lafayette College	Easton, Pennsylvania	Inactive	
Y-5	5th	1956	Dickinson College	Carlisle, Pennsylvania	Inactive	
A-6	6th	1948	University of California, Los Angeles	Los Angeles, California	Inactive, Reassigned	
A-6	6th	1957	Southern University and A&M College	Baton Rouge, Louisiana	Inactive, Reassigned	
A-6	6th	1991	San Diego State University	San Diego, California	Inactive	
B-6	6th	1948	University of California, Berkeley	Berkeley, California	Inactive, Reassigned	
B-6 (see T-8 and B-16)	6th	1958	University of Puerto Rico, Río Piedras Campus	San Juan, Puerto Rico	Reestablished, Reassigned	
**B-6**	6th		East Tennessee State University	Johnson City, Tennessee	Active	
C-6	6th	1930s–1943, 1948	University of Idaho	Moscow, Idaho	Inactive, Reassigned	
C-6 (see **C-16)**	6th	1958	Florida A&M University	Tallahassee, Florida	Reestablished	
D-6	6th	1948	Utah State Agricultural College	Logan, Utah	Inactive	
D-6 (see D-4, D-7, and **D-17**)	6th	1940–1943; 1958	Louisiana State University	Baton Rouge, Louisiana	Reestablished	
F-6	6th		University of Southern Mississippi	Hattiesburg, Mississippi	Inactive	
F-6	6th	1952	University of Arizona	Tucson, Arizona	Inactive	
G-6	6th	1958	Mississippi State College	Starkville, Mississippi	Inactive	
H-4 (see H-4)	6th	March 13, 2010	Alabama A&M University	Huntsville, Alabama	Inactive	
I-6	6th	1958	Loyola University New Orleans	New Orleans, Louisiana	Inactive	
K-6	6th	1953	Tulane University	New Orleans, Louisiana	Inactive	
M-6	6th	1958	Florida State University	Tallahassee, Florida	Inactive	
**N-6**	6th	2024	University of South Mississippi	Hattiesburg, Mississippi	Active	
O-6	6th	1958	Centenary College of Louisiana	Shreveport, Louisiana	Inactive	
P-4 (see P-6)	6th		Tuskegee University	Tuskegee, Alabama	Inactive	
**P-6 (see P-16)**	6th	1958	University of Puerto Rico at Mayagüez	Mayagüez, Puerto Rico	Reestablished	
P-6 (see P-4)	6th		Tuskegee University	Tuskegee, Alabama	Inactive	
S-6	6th	1959	Stetson University	DeLand, Florida	Inactive	
U-6 (see U-16)	6th	1958	University of Miami	Coral Gables, Florida	Reestablished	
V-6 (see W-6)	6th	1958–1959	Spring Hill College	Spring Hill, Mobile, Alabama	Inactive	
V-6	6th	1958	McNeese State College	Lake Charles, Louisiana	Inactive	
W-6 (see V-6)	6th	1958	Spring Hill College	Spring Hill, Mobile, Alabama	Inactive	
Y-6	6th	1958	Northeast Louisiana State College	Lake Charles, Louisiana	Inactive	
A-7 (see T-7 and W-2)	7th	1948	University of Missouri	Columbia, Missouri	Inactive	
A-7	7th	1958	Pittsburg State University	Pittsburg, Kansas	Inactive	(Note: Unit formed at Kansas State Teacher's College, now Pittsburg State University.)
B-7	7th		Arkansas Tech University	Russellville, Arkansas	Inactive	
B-7 (see B-2 and N-3)	7th	1929–1943 ?	Washington University in St. Louis	St. Louis, Missouri	Inactive	
C-7	7th	1948	Oklahoma State University–Stillwater	Stillwater, Oklahoma	Inactive	
D-7 (see D-4, D-6 and **D-17** )	7th	1958	Louisiana State University	Baton Rouge, Louisiana	Reestablished	
D-7	7th	1948	University of Arkansas	Fayetteville, Arkansas	Inactive	
E-7	7th	1941–1943	University of Kansas	Lawrence, Kansas	Inactive	
F-7	7th	1949	Wichita State University	Wichita, Kansas	Inactive	
**G-7**	7th	1931–1943; 194x ?–1970s; April 2010	Kansas State University	Manhattan, Kansas	Active	
H-7	7th	1948	University of Oklahoma	Norman, Oklahoma	Inactive	
I-7	7th	1955	Arkansas State College	Little Rock, Arkansas	Inactive	
K-7	7th	1949	Missouri University of Science and Technology	Rolla, Missouri	Inactive	
L-7 (see L-2)	7th		Southwest Missouri State University	Springfield, Missouri	Inactive, Reassigned	
L-7	7th	1954	Hardin–Simmons University	Abilene, Texas	Inactive	
M-7	7th		Missouri Southern State University	Joplin, Missouri	Inactive	
M-7	7th	1952	Southern Methodist University	Dallas, Texas	Inactive	
N-7	7th	1958	Ouachita Baptist College	Arkadelphia, Arkansas	Inactive	
O-7 (see H-10)	7th		College of Mines and Metallurgy of the University of Texas	El Paso, Texas	Inactive	
P-7	7th	1956	University of Texas at Austin	Austin, Texas	Inactive, Reassigned	
**P-7**	7th	2000	University of Arkansas	Pine Bluff, Arkansas	Active	
Q-7	7th	1956	Prairie View A&M College	Prairie View, Texas	Inactive	
R-7	7th		University of Central Missouri	Warrensburg, Missouri	Inactive	
R-7	7th	1957	Trinity University	San Antonio, Texas	Inactive	
S-7	7th	1958	Henderson State Teachers College	Arkadelphia, Arkansas	Inactive	
T-7	7th		Southern Arkansas University	Magnolia, Arkansas	Inactive	
T-7	7th	1959	Midwestern State University	Wichita Falls, Texas	Inactive	
T-7 (see A-7, A-7, and W-2)	7th	1990	University of Missouri	Columbia, Missouri	Inactive	
V-7	7th		Southwestern State College	Weatherford, Oklahoma	Inactive	
W-7	7th		Oklahoma Panhandle State University	Goodwell, Oklahoma	Inactive	
X-7	7th		University of Central Oklahoma	Edmond, Oklahoma	Inactive	
Y-7	7th		East Central State College	Ada, Oklahoma	Inactive	
**A-8**	8th	1936–1943; 1958–19xx ?; March 12, 2016	City College of New York	New York City, New York	Active	
B-8 (see B-5)	8th	1970s	Pennsylvania State University	University Park, Pennsylvania	Inactive	
B-8	8th	1958	Cornell University	Ithaca, New York	Inactive	
C-8	8th	1952	Massachusetts Institute of Technology	Cambridge, Massachusetts	Inactive	
C-8	8th		St. Bonaventure University	St. Bonaventure, New York	Inactive	
C-8 (see C-5 and A-15)	8th	March 11, 2017	University of Maryland, College Park	College Park, Maryland	Inactive	
**D-8**	8th	April 20, 1948–19xx ?; 1958	Fordham University	New York, New York	Active	
E-8	8th		New York University Heights	Bronx, New York City, New York	Inactive	
E-8 (see P-5, P-15, E-15 and **T-8**)	8th	1974–1981, 1984–2006	Johns Hopkins University	Baltimore, Maryland	Reestablished	
F-8	8th	1948	Syracuse University	Syracuse, New York	Inactive	
G-8	8th	1952	Clarkson University	Potsdam, New York	Inactive, Reassigned	
G-8	8th		Brooklyn College	New York City, New York	Inactive, Reassigned	
G-8	8th		Siena College	Loudonville, New York	Inactive, Reassigned	
**G-8**	8th	March 8, 1974	Howard University	Washington, D.C.	Active	
H-8	8th	1950	Polytechnic Institute of Brooklyn	Brooklyn, New York	Inactive	
I-8	8th	1952	Boston University	Boston, Massachusetts	Reestablished	
I-8	8th	1952	Pratt Institute	Brooklyn, New York	Inactive	
I-8	8th		University of Pittsburgh	Pittsburgh, Pennsylvania	Inactive	
**J-8** (see V-5 and H-15)	8th	March 15, 1954	Morgan State University	Baltimore, Maryland	Active	
**K-8**	8th	March 17, 1951 – xxxx ?; March 12, 2016	Seton Hall University	South Orange, New Jersey	Active	
L-8	8th	1952	New York University Washington Square Campus	New York City, New York	Inactive	
L-8	8th		Indiana University of Pennsylvania	Indiana, Pennsylvania	Inactive	
M-8	8th		Columbia University	New York City, New York	Inactive	
N-8	8th	1952	Saint Peter's University	Jersey City, New Jersey	Inactive	
O-8	8th	1957	Gannon College	Erie, Pennsylvania	Inactive, Reassigned	
**O-8**	8th		Canisius College	Buffalo, New York	Active	
P-8	8th	1955	State University of New York Maritime College	Bronx, New York City, New York	Inactive	
Q-8	8th	1952	Hofstra University	Hempstead, New York	Inactive	
R-8	8th	1936–1943; 1949	Clarkson College	Potsdam, New York	Inactive, Reassigned	
R-8	8th		St. John's University	Jamaica, Queens, New York	Inactive	
S-8	8th	November 7, 1959	Niagara University	Niagara, New York	Inactive	
T-8 (see B-6 and B-16)	8th		University of Puerto Rico, Río Piedras Campus	San Juan, Puerto Rico	Reestablished, Reassigned	
**T-8** (see P-5, P-15, E-8, and E-15)	8th	2012	Johns Hopkins University	Baltimore, Maryland	Active	
X-8 (see X-15)	8th		University of Delaware	Newark, Delaware	Inactive	
**Z-8**	8th		Rochester Institute of Technology	Rochester, New York	Reestablished	
A-9	9th	1958	University of Denver	Denver, Colorado	Inactive	
A-9	9th		University of Alaska Fairbanks	College, Alaska	Inactive	
**B-9**	9th	1950	University of Colorado Boulder	Boulder, Colorado	Active	
C-9	9th	1958	Colorado School of Mines	Golden, Colorado	Inactive	
D-9	9th	1953	Colorado College	Colorado Springs, Colorado	Inactive	
D-9	9th		Southern Colorado State College	Pueblo, Colorado	Inactive	
E-9	9th		South Dakota School of Mines and Technology	Rapid City, South Dakota	Inactive	
E-9	9th	1958	New Mexico College of Agriculture and Mechanic Arts	Las Cruces, New Mexico	Inactive	
F-9	9th	1958	Idaho State College	Pocatello, Idaho	Inactive	
G-9	9th	1948	Utah State University	Logan, Utah	Inactive	
H-9	9th		Colorado State University	Fort Collins, Colorado	Inactive	
H-9 (see H-10, H-17, and A-14)	9th		Texas Western College	El Paso, Texas	Reestablished	
**I-9**	9th	2023	United States Air Force Academy	Colorado Springs, Colorado	Active	
A-10	10th	1958	University of Arizona	Tucson, Arizona	Inactive	
B-10	10th	1950	University of San Francisco	San Francisco, California	Inactive, Reassigned	
**B-10**	10th	2013	California State University, Fresno	Fresno, California	Active	
C-10	10th	1959	New Mexico State University	Las Cruces, New Mexico	Inactive	
D-10	10th	1953	Arizona State University	Tempe, Arizona	Inactive	
E-10	10th	1954	University of Santa Clara	Santa Clara, California	Inactive	
F-10	10th	1957	San Jose State College	San Jose, California	Inactive	
G-10	10th		University of California, Los Angeles	Los Angeles, California	Inactive, Reassigned	
**G-10**	10th		California Baptist University	Riverside, California	Active	
H-10 (see H-10, H-17 and A-14)	10th	1958	Texas Western College	El Paso, Texas	Inactive	
I-10	10th		University of California, Santa Barbara	Santa Barbara, California	Inactive	
A-11	11th	1960	University of Alaska Fairbanks	College, Alaska	Inactive	
B-11	11th	1952	University of Washington	Seattle, Washington	Inactive	
C-11	11th	1958	University of Idaho	Moscow, Idaho	Inactive	
D-11	11th	1958–1959	State College of Washington	Pullman, Washington	Inactive	
E-11	11th	1949	Oregon State University	Eugene, Oregon	Inactive	
F-11	11th	1958–1959	Montana State University	Missoula, Montana	Inactive	
G-11	11th		University of Oregon	Eugene, Oregon	Inactive	
H-11	11th	1959	Seattle University	Seattle, Washington	Inactive	
**A-12**	12th	1952	Northeastern University	Boston, Massachusetts	Active	
**B-12**	12th	1950	Boston University	Boston, Massachusetts	Active	
**C-12** (see H-5)	12th	1947–19xx ?; April 24, 1972	Massachusetts Institute of Technology	Cambridge, Massachusetts	Active	
D-12	12th	1951	University of Rhode Island	Kingston, Rhode Island	Inactive	
E-12	12th	1953	Worcester Polytechnic Institute	Worcester, Massachusetts	Inactive	
F-12	12th	1952	University of Connecticut	Storrs, Connecticut	Inactive	
F-12	12th		Stonehill College	Easton, Massachusetts	Inactive	
G-12	12th		University of Massachusetts Amherst	Amherst, Massachusetts	Inactive	
H-12	12th	1958	University of New Hampshire	Durham, New Hampshire	Inactive	
K-12	12th	1957	Providence College	Providence, Rhode Island	Inactive	
I-12	12th		Bowdoin College	Brunswick, Maine	Inactive	
L-12	12th	1958	University of Vermont	Burlington, Vermont	Inactive	
M-12	12th	1959	University of Maine	Orono, Maine	Inactive	
N-12	12th		Lowell Technological Institute	Lowell, Massachusetts	Inactive	
A-14 (see E-7, H-10, and H-17)	14th		University of Texas at El Paso	El Paso, Texas	Inactive	
W-14	14th		University of New Mexico	Albuquerque, New Mexico	Inactive	
Z-14	14th		Northern Arizona University	Flagstaff, Arizona	Inactive	
A-15 (see C-5, A-15, and **C-8**)	15th	1961	University of Maryland, College Park	College Park, Maryland	Reestablished	
B-15	15th	1961	Virginia State College	Petersburg, Virginia	Inactive	
C-15 (see **R-4**)	15th		Norfolk State University	Norfolk, Virginia	Reestablished	
C-15	15th	1961	Virginia Tech	Blacksburg, Virginia	Inactive	
D-15 (see I-5, D-15, and **U-4**)	15th	November 28, 1950 – 19xx ?; 1961	Hampton University	Hampton, Virginia	Reestablished	
E-15 (see P-5, P-15, E-8, and **T-8**)	15th	Late 1960s–1974	Johns Hopkins University	Baltimore, Maryland	Reestablished	
F-15	15th	1961	George Washington University	Washington, D.C.	Inactive	
G-15	15th	1961	Loyola University Maryland	Baltimore, Maryland	Inactive	
H-15 (see V-5 and **J-8**)	15th	1961	Morgan State University	Baltimore, Maryland	Reestablished	
Q-15 (see Q-5)	15th	1967	Pennsylvania Military College	Chester, Pennsylvania	Inactive	(Note: Unit was the 5th Regiment, 2nd Battalion from 1958 to 1959.)
P-15 (see P-5, E-8, E-15 and **T-8**	15th	1960s	Johns Hopkins University	Baltimore, Maryland	Reestablished	
R-15	15th		University of Richmond	Richmond, Virginia	Inactive	
X-15 (see **X-8**)	15th	May 1969	University of Delaware	Newark, Delaware	Reestablished	
**A-16**	16th		Fort Valley State University	Fort Valley, Georgia	Active	
B-16 (see T-8 and B-6)	16th		University of Puerto Rico, Río Piedras Campus	San Juan, Puerto Rico	Inactive, Reassigned	
B-16	16th		Alcorn State University	Lorman, Mississippi	Inactive, Reassigned	
**B-16**	16th		Morehouse College	Atlanta, Georgia	Active	
**B-16** (see T-4)	16th		Georgia State University	Atlanta, Georgia	Active	
**C-16** (see C-6)	16th		Florida A&M University	Tallahassee, Florida	Active	
E-16	16th		Embry–Riddle Aeronautical University, Daytona Beach	Daytona Beach, Florida	Reassigned	
**E-16**	16th		Bethune–Cookman University	Daytona Beach, Florida	Active	
F-16	16th		University of Southern Mississippi	Hattiesburg, Mississippi	Inactive	
**G-16**	16th	March 12, 2016	Albany State University	Albany, Georgia	Active	
I-16	16th		Loyola University New Orleans	New Orleans, Louisiana	Inactive	
J-16	16th		Jackson State University	Jackson, Mississippi	Inactive	
M-16	16th		Florida State University	Tallahassee, Florida	Inactive	
N-16	16th		Nicholls State University	Thibodaux, Louisiana	Inactive	
P-16 (see P-6)	16th		University of Puerto Rico at Mayagüez	Mayagüez, Puerto Rico	Inactive	
S-16	16th		Stetson University	DeLand, Florida	Inactive	
T-16	16th		University of Tampa	Tampa, Florida	Inactive	
U-16 or V-16 (see U-6)	16th		University of Miami	Coral Gables, Florida	Inactive	
W-16	16th		McNeese State University	Lake Charles, Louisiana	Inactive	
**Z-16**	16th	March 12, 2016	Florida International University	Miami, Florida	Active	
A-17	17th		Texas State University	San Marcos, Texas	Inactive	
**B-17**	17th		Alcorn State University	Lorman, Mississippi	Active	
C-17	17th		New Mexico State University	Las Cruces, New Mexico	Inactive	
D-17	17th		Arizona State University	Tempe, Arizona	Reassigned	
**D-17** (see D-4, D-6, and D-7)	17th		Louisiana State University	Baton Rouge, Louisiana	Active	
**G-17**	17th		Grambling State University	Grambling, Louisiana	Active	
H-17 (see E-7, H-10, and A-14)	17th		University of Texas at El Paso	El Paso, Texas	Reestablished	
L-17	17th		Hardin–Simmons University	Abilene, Texas	Inactive	
M-17	17th		Stephen F. Austin State University	Nacogdoches, Texas	Inactive	
M-17	17th		Eastern New Mexico University	Portales, New Mexico	Inactive	
Q-17	17th		Prairie View A&M University	Prairie View, Texas	Inactive	
R-17	17th		Trinity University	San Antonio, Texas	Inactive	
T-17	17th		Midwestern State University	Wichita Falls, Texas	Inactive	
T-17	17th		Texas Tech University	Lubbock, Texas	Inactive	

== Regimental headquarters ==
By tradition, the National Headquarters is at the University of Nebraska–Lincoln. However, the current national staff is selected from across the society, and staff members may be from several different Pershing Rifles units. Currently, Pershing Rifles has a combined regimental structure where two or more regiments are grouped under one regimental commander who may be selected from any unit in the combined regiment.

- 1st Regiment Headquarters – University of Toledo, Toledo, Ohio / Ohio State University, Columbus, Ohio
- 2nd Regiment Headquarters – Marquette University, Milwaukee, Wisconsin / University of Minnesota, Minneapolis, Minnesota / University of Iowa, Iowa City, Iowa
- 3rd Regiment/Brigade Headquarters – Indiana University Bloomington, Bloomington, Indiana
- 4th Regiment Headquarters – Clemson University, Clemson, South Carolina
- 5th Regiment Headquarters – Pennsylvania State University, University Park, Pennsylvania
- 6th Regiment/Brigade Headquarters – Louisiana State University, Baton Rouge, Louisiana / University of Idaho, Moscow, Idaho
- 7th Regiment/Brigade Headquarters – Oklahoma State University–Stillwater, Stillwater, Oklahoma
- 8th Regiment Headquarters – City College of New York / Seton Hall University / Saint Peter's University
- 9th Regiment Headquarters – University of Colorado Boulder, Boulder, Colorado / University of Denver, Denver, Colorado (1958)
- 10th Regiment Headquarters – Northern Arizona University, Flagstaff, Arizona / University of Arizona (1958–1959)
- 11th Regiment Headquarters – Oregon State University, Corvallis, Oregon (ended after 1964)
- 12th Regiment Headquarters – Massachusetts Institute of Technology, Cambridge, Massachusetts, through June 1962; Northeastern University, Boston, Massachusetts, June 1962 through c. 1978 / University of Connecticut, Storrs, Connecticut
- 14th Brigade/Regiment Headquarters – Northern Arizona University, Flagstaff, Arizona
- 15th Regiment Headquarters – University of Maryland, College Park, College Park, Maryland
- 16th Regiment/Brigade Headquarters – University of Tampa, Tampa, Florida / Florida State University, Tallahassee, Florida
- 17th Regiment Headquarters – Prairie View A&M University, Prairie View, Texas / Trinity University, San Antonio, Texas
