= 19th Century Spring Hill Neighborhood Thematic Resource =

- U.S. National Register of Historic Places
- Location: Mobile, Alabama
- Coordinates: 30°41′52″N 88°8′30″W
- NRHP reference No.: 64000005

The 19th Century Spring Hill Neighborhood Thematic Resource is a multiple property submission of buildings that were listed together on the National Register of Historic Places. It covers eight properties in the Spring Hill neighborhood of Mobile, Alabama, all built during the mid-19th century.

They represent the most intact buildings to survive from the period when Spring Hill was a summer retreat town for wealthy Mobilians seeking to escape the heat and yellow fever epidemics of the city. Situated upon what was once the western hills outside Mobile, Spring Hill was gradually absorbed by the larger city and little remains today from its period as an independent community.

== Properties ==
Resource Name	Coordinates	City	County	Added	Notes
Beal-Gaillard House	30°41′56″N 88°7′59″W	Mobile	Mobile County	October 18, 1984	Creole cottage built in 1836.
Center-Gaillard House	30°42′5″N 88°8′6″W	Mobile	Mobile County	October 18, 1984	Brick house built in 1827.
Collins-Marston House	30°41′35″N 88°9′5″W	Mobile	Mobile County	October 18, 1984	Gulf Coast cottage built in 1832.
Collins-Robinson House	30°41′42″N 88°9′7″W	Mobile	Mobile County	October 18, 1984	Creole cottage built in 1843.
Pfau-Crichton Cottage	30°41′53″N 88°7′40″W	Mobile	Mobile County	October 18, 1984	Gulf Coast cottage built in 1862.
Saint Paul's Episcopal Chapel	30°41′53″N 88°8′20″W	Mobile	Mobile County	October 18, 1984	Episcopal church built in 1859.
Sodality Chapel	30°41′30″N 88°8′13″W	Mobile	Mobile County	October 18, 1984	Roman Catholic chapel built in 1850.
Stewartfield	30°41′38″N 88°8′32″W	Mobile	Mobile County	October 18, 1984	Greek Revival style mansion built in 1849.

== See also ==
- National Register of Historic Places listings in Mobile, Alabama
- National Register of Historic Places Multiple Property Submissions in Alabama
