= Stewartfield =

Stewartfield may refer to:

- Stewartfield (Mobile, Alabama)
- Stewartfield, East Kilbride

== See also ==
- Stuartfield, Aberdeenshire, Scotland
