= Juana Rodríguez Morales House =

Historic house in Cayey, Puerto Rico

- U.S. National Register of Historic Places
- Location within Puerto Rico
- Location: 7 Nuñez Romeu St., Cayey, Puerto Rico
- Coordinates: 18.1132°N 66.1662°W
- Area: less than one acre
- Built: 1850
- Architectural style: Spanish Creole Townhouse
- NRHP reference No.: 05000257
- Added to NRHP: April 6, 2005

The Juana Rodríguez Morales House, in Cayey, Puerto Rico, at 7 Nuñez Romeu St., is a Spanish Creole-style townhouse built c.1850. It faces the plaza in the center of town. It was listed on the National Register of Historic Places in 2005.

It has also been known as the Espadi-Cervoni House.

It was home of a wealthy family and is a good example of local vernacular style that is depicted in period paintings.

It is built of timber-frame construction, with mortise-and-tenon joints.

== See also ==
- Creole architecture in the United States
