= Collins–Robinson House =

Historic house in Alabama, United States

- U.S. National Register of Historic Places
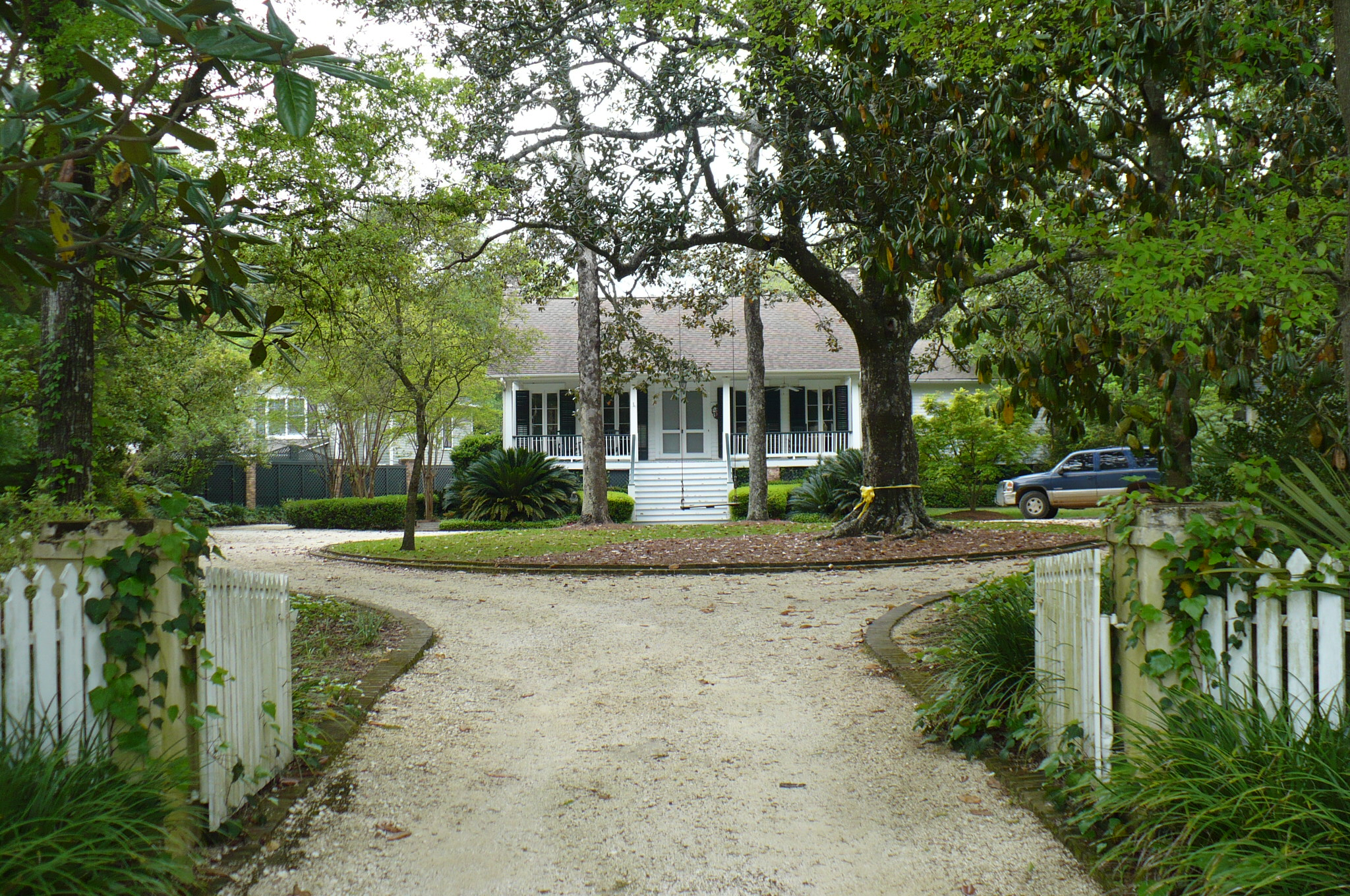
- The Collins–Robinson House in 2008

- Location within Mobile, Alabama Location within Alabama Location within the United States
- Location: Mobile, Alabama
- Coordinates: 30°41′42″N 88°9′7″W
- Built: 1843
- Architectural style: Creole cottage
- MPS: 19th Century Spring Hill Neighborhood TR
- NRHP reference No.: 84000087
- Added to NRHP: October 18, 1984

The Collins–Robinson House is a historic residence in Mobile, Alabama. It was built in 1843 in a Creole cottage style. It was placed on the National Register of Historic Places on October 18, 1984, as a part of the 19th Century Spring Hill Neighborhood Thematic Resource.
