= List of faculty and alumni of Spring Hill College =

This is a list of influential and newsworthy people affiliated with Spring Hill College, a private, Jesuit college in Mobile, Alabama. The list includes professors, staff, graduates, and former students belonging to any of Spring Hill's undergraduate or graduate schools.

== Alumni ==
- Nick Bollettieri, 1953 tennis coach
- Eric Campbell, professional basketball player
- Philip J. Carey, 1940, Illinois state senator and judge
- Felix. L. Cirlot, Anglo-Catholic writer and Episcopal priest
- Jeremiah Denton, career U.S. Navy officer, admiral; held as an American POW during the Vietnam War
- Susan DuBose, politician from Alabama
- Olaf Fink, politician and member of the Louisiana State Senate 1956–1972; New Orleans educator.
- Patrick J. Geary, medieval historian and professor at the Institute for Advanced Studies
- Mickey Gorka (born 1972), Israeli basketball player and coach
- Jim Hendry, executive with the New York Yankees; played baseball while student at Spring Hill
- Alexis Herman, U.S. Secretary of Labor
- Miller Reese Hutchison, 1895, inventor of the first electric hearing aid; worked at the Edison Laboratory
- Jo Ann Jenkins (Class of 1980), CEO American Association of Retired Persons; chief operating officer of the Library of Congress
- Stephen Karopczyc, 1965, U.S. Army first lieutenant awarded the Medal of Honor
- Patricia Krenwinkel, student at the college for less than a semester; went to California and joined "The Family", the followers of the murderer Charles Manson
- Joe Langan, 1951, Alabama state senator, finance commissioner for four terms and mayor of Mobile, Alabama; credited with keeping peace during the civil rights years and forming alliances with black leaders, especially John LeFlore
- Stephen Mallory, secretary of the Navy for the Confederate States of America
- Dominic Mauncy, 3rd bishop of Mobile
- Colman McCarthy, leading peace educator, founder of the Center for Teaching Peace, and columnist at The Washington Post
- Samuel D. McEnery, governor of Louisiana; Louisiana Supreme Court; United States senator from Louisiana
- Paul Morphy (1855), aged 18 at graduation; considered to have been the strongest chess master of his time, as well as the first recorded chess prodigy in history. In 1957, a centennial monument dedicated to Morphy's 1857 victory in the First American Chess Conference was erected behind Mobile Hall, presented by the Log Cabin National Chess Affiliation (now defunct).
- Eric Olen, college basketball coach
- Barry Preedom, physicist
- Clemens V. Rault, rear admiral in the United States Navy, dean of Georgetown University School of Dentistry, and chief of the United States Navy Dental Corps, 1932–1933 and 1948–1950
- John T. Schuessler, retired chairman of the board, CEO, and president of Wendy's International, Inc.
- Todd Schuler (1999), Maryland state delegate (D)
- Joseph A. Sellinger, president of Loyola University Maryland
- Blake Stein (2005), baseball pitcher for the Pittsburgh Pirates in the National League
- Dana Veth (2012), professional Bahamian soccer player
- T. Semmes Walmsley, mayor of New Orleans
- Tony Younger (born 1980), American-Israeli basketball player in the Israeli National League

== Faculty ==
- Ann Bedsole, Alabama state senator of Mobile; Spring Hill College trustee
- Magda B. Arnold, psychologist who developed the appraisal theory of emotions; taught at Spring Hill from the early 1970s until retirement in 1975
- Edward Troye, mid-19th century artist; taught French and drawing at the college 1849–1855
- Mary H. Van Brunt, economist and academic administrator
