= Collins–Marston House =

Historic house in Alabama, United States

- U.S. National Register of Historic Places
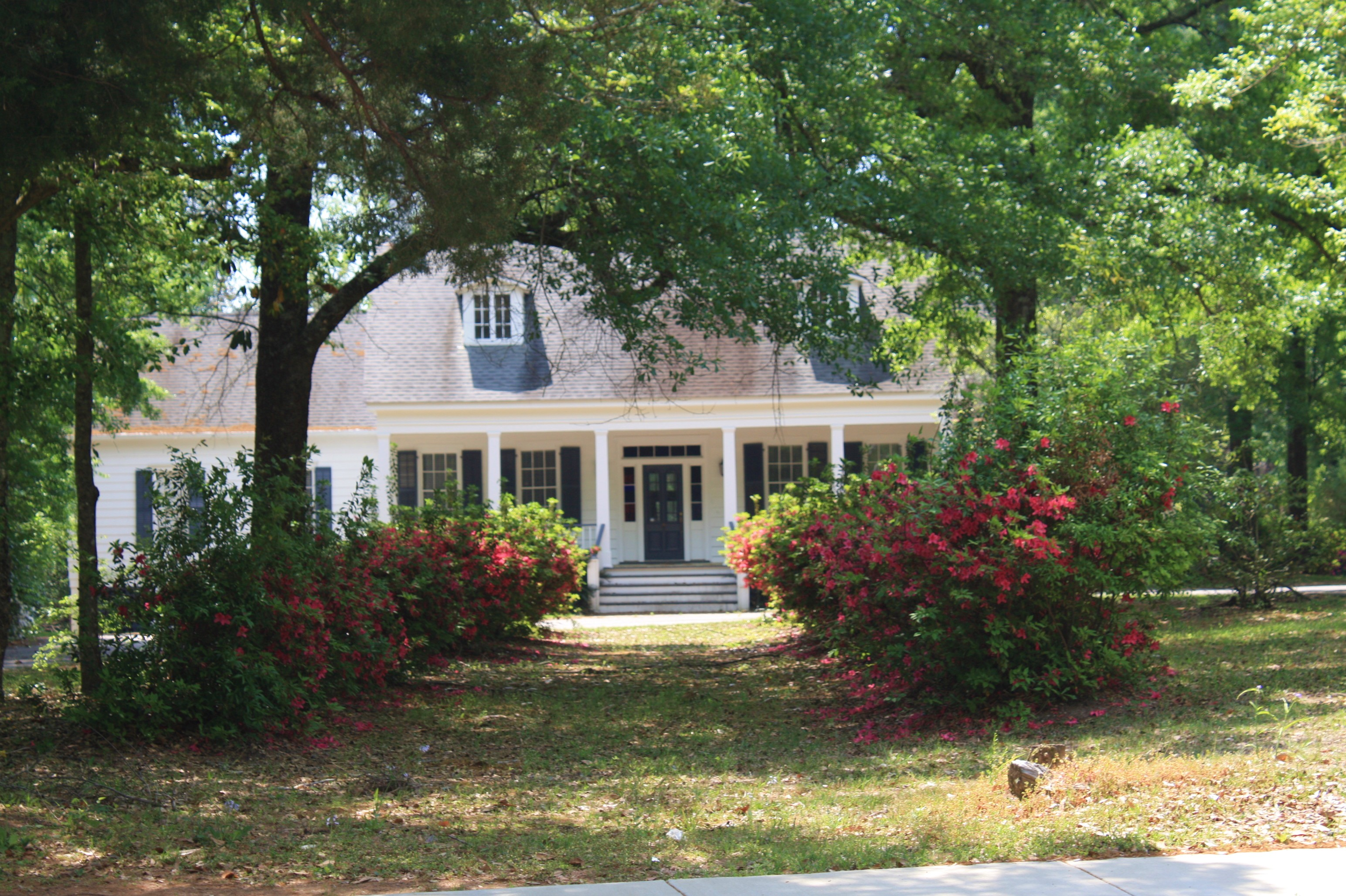
- Collins–Marston House in 2010

- Location within Mobile, Alabama Location within Alabama Location within the United States
- Location: 4703 Old Shell Road, Mobile, Alabama
- Coordinates: 30°41′35″N 88°9′5″W
- Built: 1832
- Architectural style: Gulf Coast Cottage
- MPS: 19th Century Spring Hill Neighborhood TR
- NRHP reference No.: 84000083
- Added to NRHP: October 18, 1984

The Collins–Marston House is a historic house located at 4703 Old Shell Road in Mobile, Alabama.

== Description and history ==
The 1 1/2-story wood-frame structure, on a raised brick foundation, was built in 1832 in the Gulf Coast Cottage style. The 20th century saw additions to the rear that roughly tripled the original size of the house. It was placed on the National Register of Historic Places on October 18, 1984, as a part of the 19th Century Spring Hill Neighborhood Thematic Resource.
