= Pfau–Crichton Cottage =

Historic house in Alabama, United States

- U.S. National Register of Historic Places
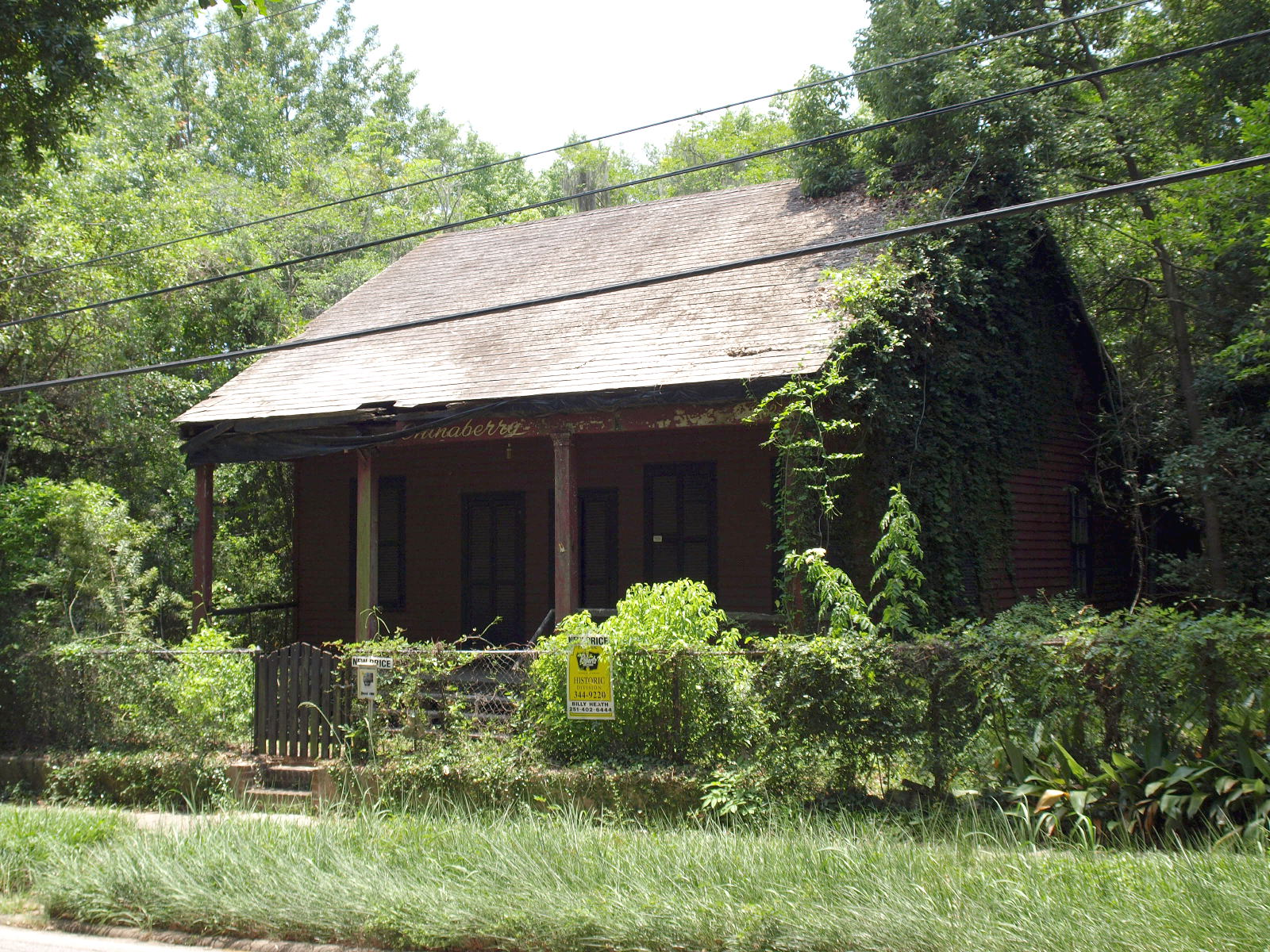
- The house in June 2014

- Location within Mobile, Alabama Location within Alabama Location within the United States
- Location: 3703 Old Shell Rd., Mobile, Alabama
- Coordinates: 30°41′55″N 88°7′40″W
- Area: 0.5 acres (0.20 ha)
- Built: 1862
- MPS: 19th Century Spring Hill Neighborhood TR
- NRHP reference No.: 84000120
- Added to NRHP: October 18, 1984

The Pfau–Crichton Cottage, best known as Chinaberry, is a historic cottage in Mobile, Alabama.

== History ==
The 1 1/2-story, wood-frame, Gulf Coast cottage was completed in 1862. The house was built by the Pfau family, but its best known resident was Miss Anne Randolph Crichton, known for the elaborate gardens that she developed on the property. She enlisted in the Navy at the outbreak of World War I and continued her service until retirement, in the 1950s. She traveled extensively in Europe during the 1930s, maintaining scrapbooks that recorded her visits to various art museums, gardens, and monuments. She was the last direct descendant of Hugh Randolph Crichton, the founder of the Mobile County town of Crichton. The house was added to the National Register of Historic Places on October 18, 1984, as a part of the 19th Century Spring Hill Neighborhood Thematic Resource listing of well-preserved buildings that represent the historical development of what was once the village of Spring Hill.

After Crichton's death, the house sat vacant for decades. It was restored and an addition built in 2018 by a real estate company for use as offices.

== Architecture ==
The cottage is unique in its architectural features. The home itself is a two-story structure, each floor being measured at 700 sq ft (65 m^{2}). The bottom floor of the home is the central living area consisting of the kitchen, library, bathroom, living room, dining room, and a single bedroom. The unique part of this part of the architecture is that all rooms are connected by multiple doorways, but no hallways. The upper floor is a one-room storage area.

On the property there are a total of three structures. Aside from the cottage itself there is an outlying kitchen and a chapel. There are brick walkways that lead to each structure and all garden areas.
