= Beal–Gaillard House =

Historic house in Alabama, United States

- U.S. National Register of Historic Places
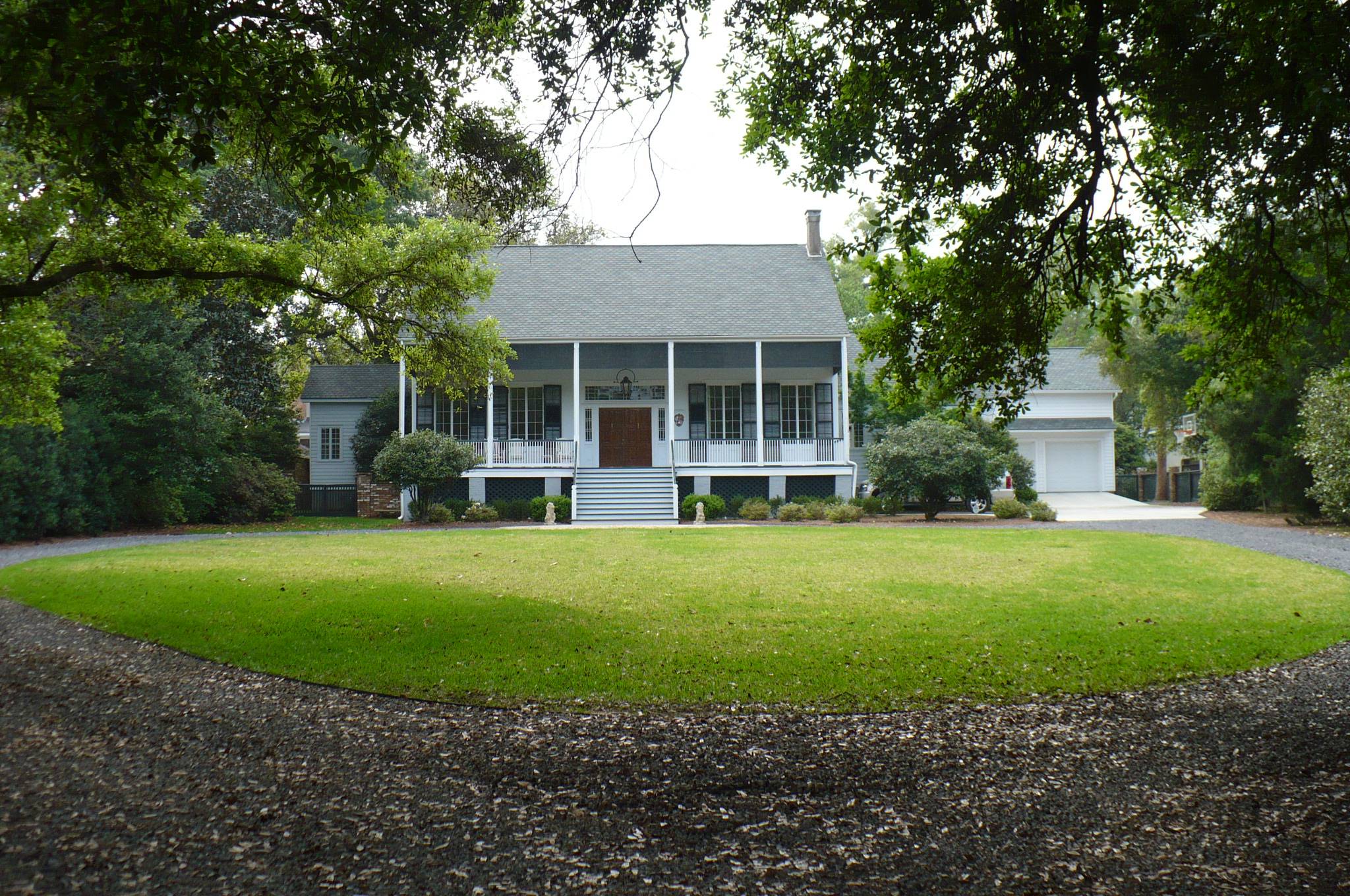
- Beal-Gaillard House in 2008.

- Location within Mobile, Alabama Location within Alabama Location within the United States
- Location: 111 Myrtlewood Lane, Mobile, Alabama; United States
- Coordinates: 30°41′57″N 88°7′59″W
- Area: 5 acres (2.0 ha)
- Built: 1836
- Architectural style: Creole Cottage
- MPS: 19th Century Spring Hill Neighborhood TR
- NRHP reference No.: 84000078
- Added to NRHP: October 18, 1984

The Beal–Gaillard House is a historic house located at 111 Myrtlewood Lane in Mobile, Alabama. It is locally significant as an excellent example of a large country home constructed before the widespread use of highly sophisticated moldings and columnar orders.

== Description and history ==
It was built in 1836 in a Creole cottage style. It is located at the center of its original 5-acre plot, the northwest corner of which has been sold to a relative. The frame dwelling is raised on a high foundation wall made of about 32 courses of brick, and giving sufficient head room to be able to examine the beautifully mortised and pegged framing. It was placed on the National Register of Historic Places on October 18, 1984, as a part of the 19th Century Spring Hill Neighborhood Thematic Resource.
