= Center–Gaillard House =

Historic house in Alabama, United States

- U.S. National Register of Historic Places
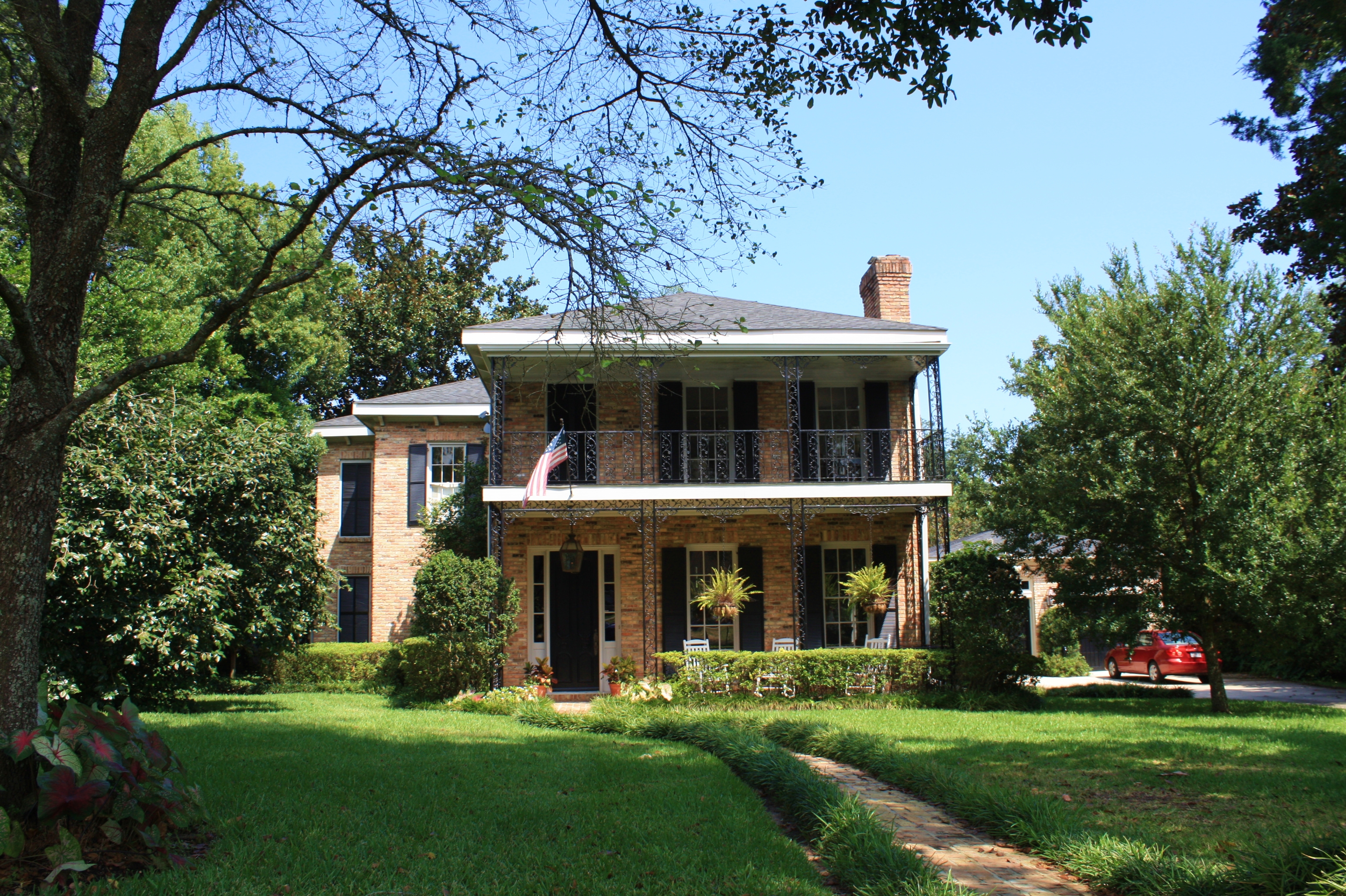

- Location within Mobile, Alabama Location within Alabama Location within the United States
- Location: 3500 The Cedars; Mobile, Alabama; United States
- Coordinates: 30°42′5″N 88°8′6″W
- Built: 1827
- MPS: 19th Century Spring Hill Neighborhood TR
- NRHP reference No.: 84000081
- Added to NRHP: October 18, 1984

The Center–Gaillard House is a historic residence in Mobile, Alabama, United States. The earliest part of the house was built in 1827. It was placed on the National Register of Historic Places on October 18, 1984, as a part of the 19th Century Spring Hill Neighborhood Thematic Resource.
