= Sodality Chapel =

- U.S. National Register of Historic Places
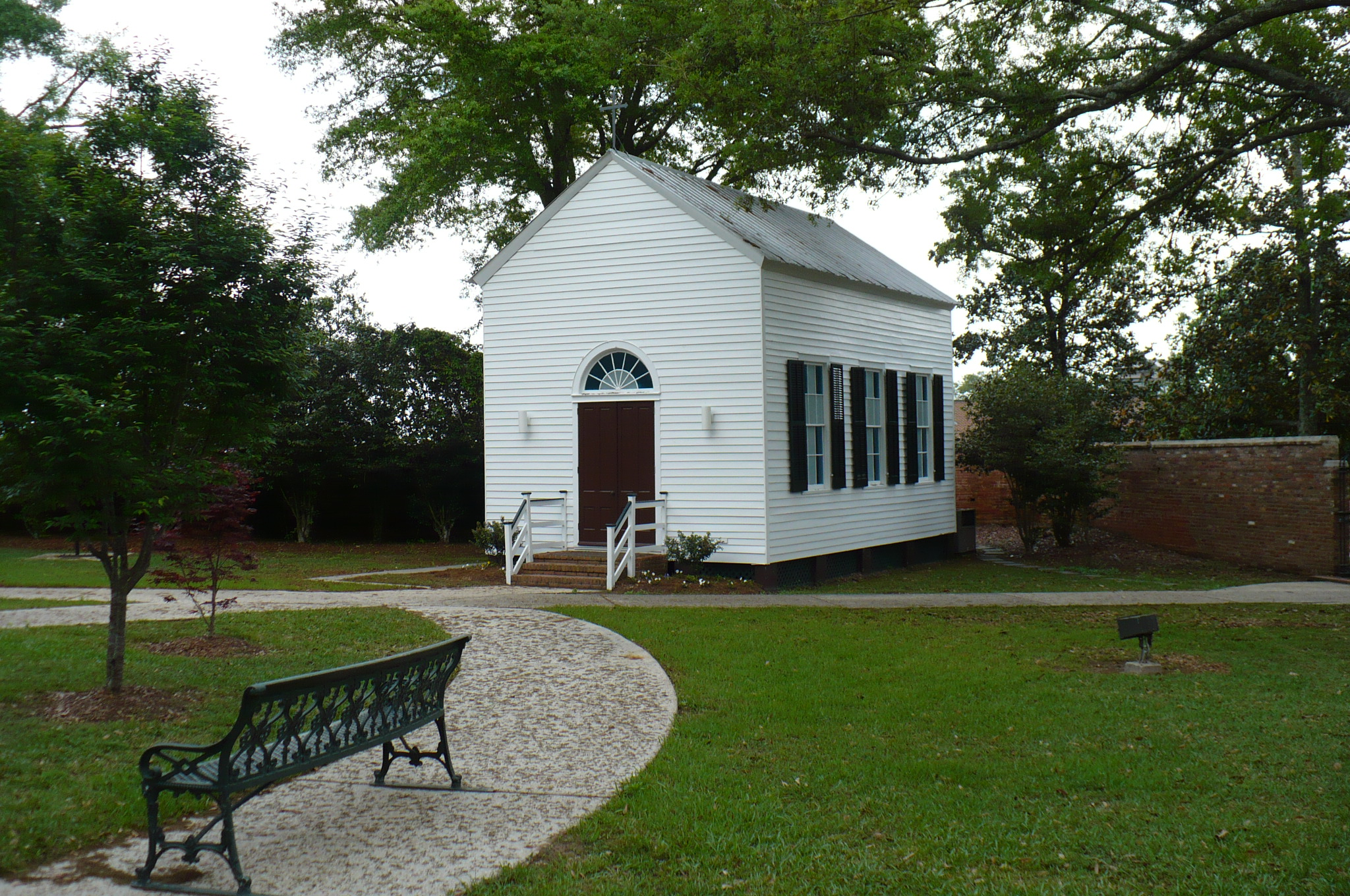
- The Sodality Chapel in 2008

- Location within Mobile, Alabama Location within Alabama Location within the United States
- Location: Mobile, Alabama
- Coordinates: 30°41′32″N 88°8′7″W
- Built: 1850
- Architectural style: Greek Revival
- MPS: 19th Century Spring Hill Neighborhood Thematic Resource
- NRHP reference No.: 84000122
- Added to NRHP: October 18, 1984

The Sodality Chapel is a historic Roman Catholic chapel building on the campus of Spring Hill College in Mobile, Alabama, United States. It was built in 1850 in a simple Greek Revival style. The building was placed on the National Register of Historic Places as a part of the 19th Century Spring Hill Neighborhood Thematic Resource on October 18, 1984.

== See also ==
- Spring Hill College
