= Spring Hill College Quadrangle =

- U.S. National Register of Historic Places
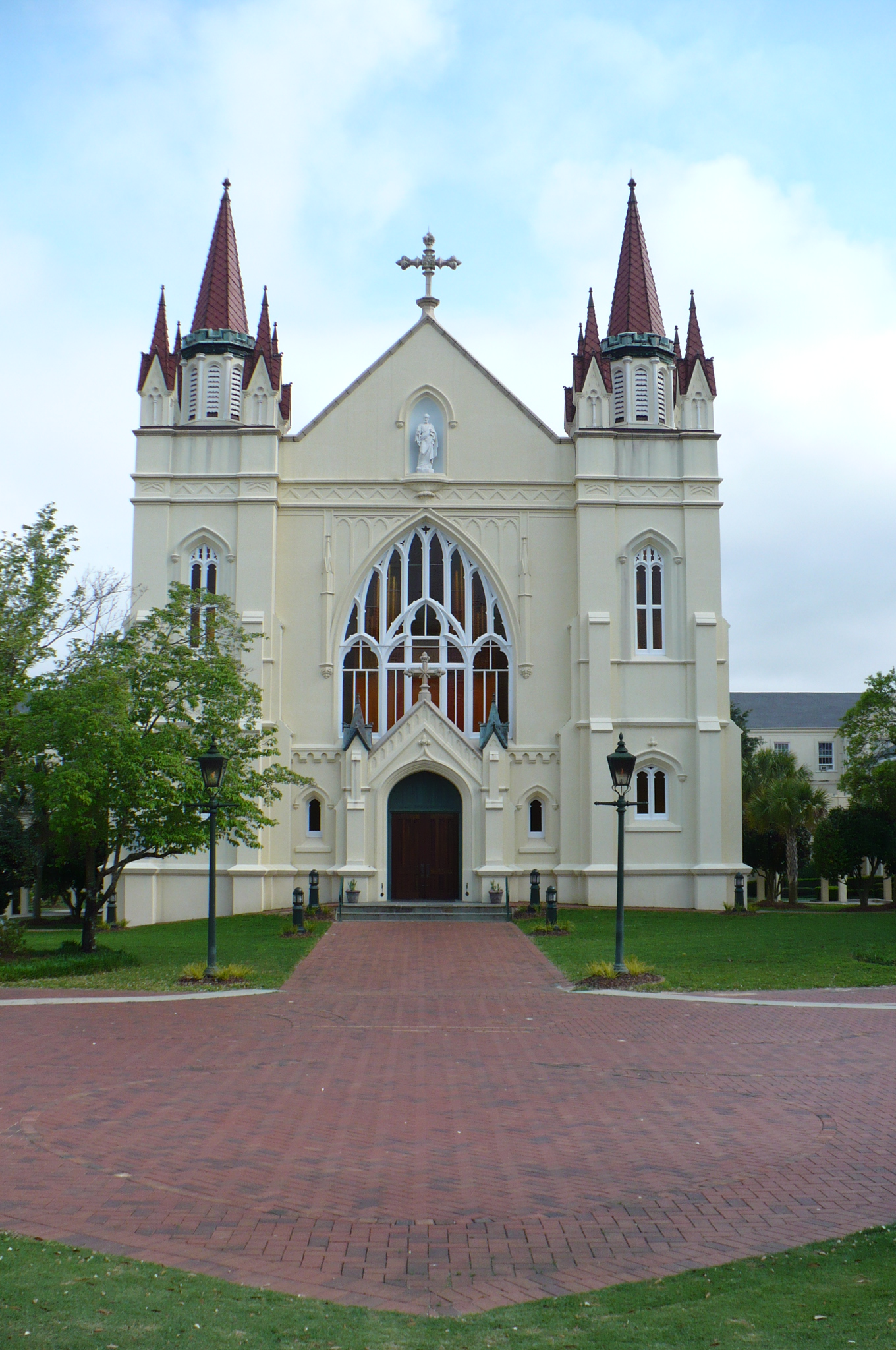
- The front facade of St. Joseph's Chapel, built c.1910, on the Spring Hill College Quadrangle.

- Location within Mobile, Alabama Location within Alabama Location within the United States
- Location: Mobile, Alabama
- Coordinates: 30°41′36″N 88°8′13″W
- Built: 1831, 1869, 1910
- Architectural style: Neo-Renaissance, Gothic Revival
- NRHP reference No.: 73000365
- Added to NRHP: August 17, 1973

The Spring Hill College Quadrangle is a grouping of historic structures on the campus of Spring Hill College in Mobile, Alabama, United States. The original main building was constructed in 1831 in the Greek Revival style, but burned in 1869. It was replaced within the year by a new main building on the same site in a Neo-Renaissance style. St. Joseph's Chapel was built c.1910 in the Gothic Revival style on the northern side of the quadrangle, with the main building on the southern side. The perimeter of the quadrangle is enclosed by an open arched arcade, topped by crenellation. The grouping was placed on the National Register of Historic Places on August 17, 1973.

Gallery
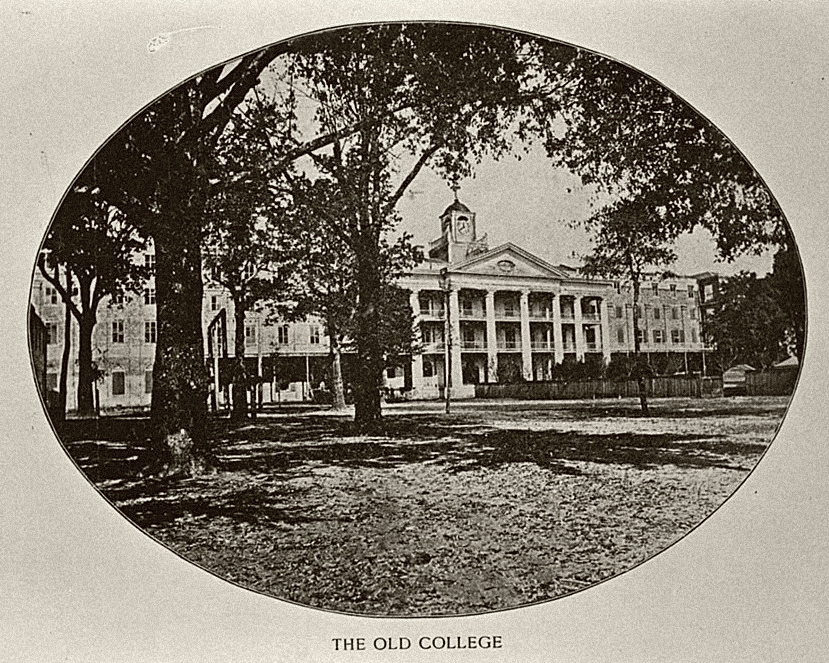
The original main building on the quad, built c.1831 and burned c.1869.

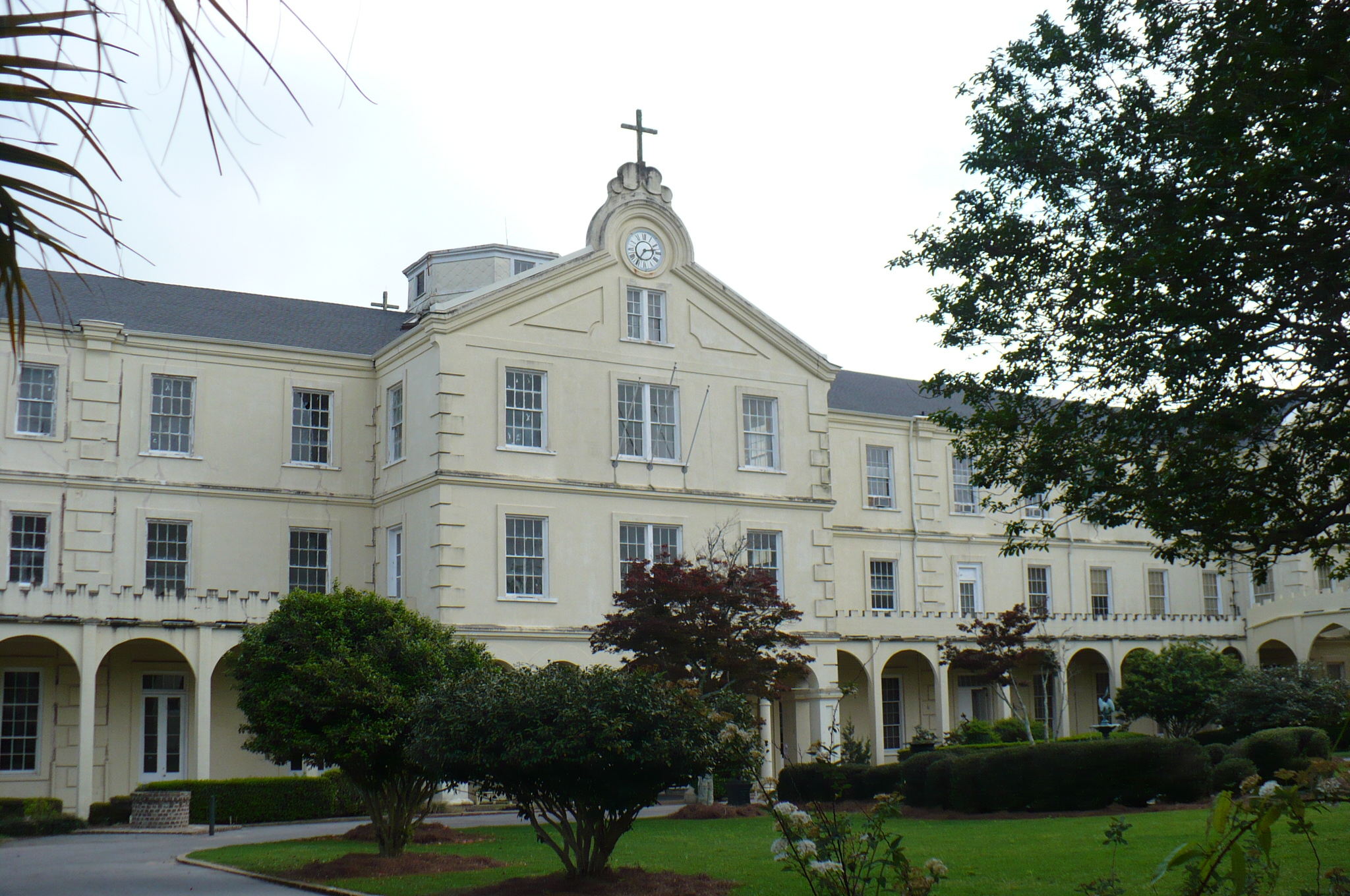
The current Administration Building, designed by James Freret and built c.1869 on the site of the old main building.

== See also ==
- Spring Hill College
