= Saint Paul's Episcopal Chapel (Mobile, Alabama) =

Historic church in Alabama, United States

- U.S. National Register of Historic Places
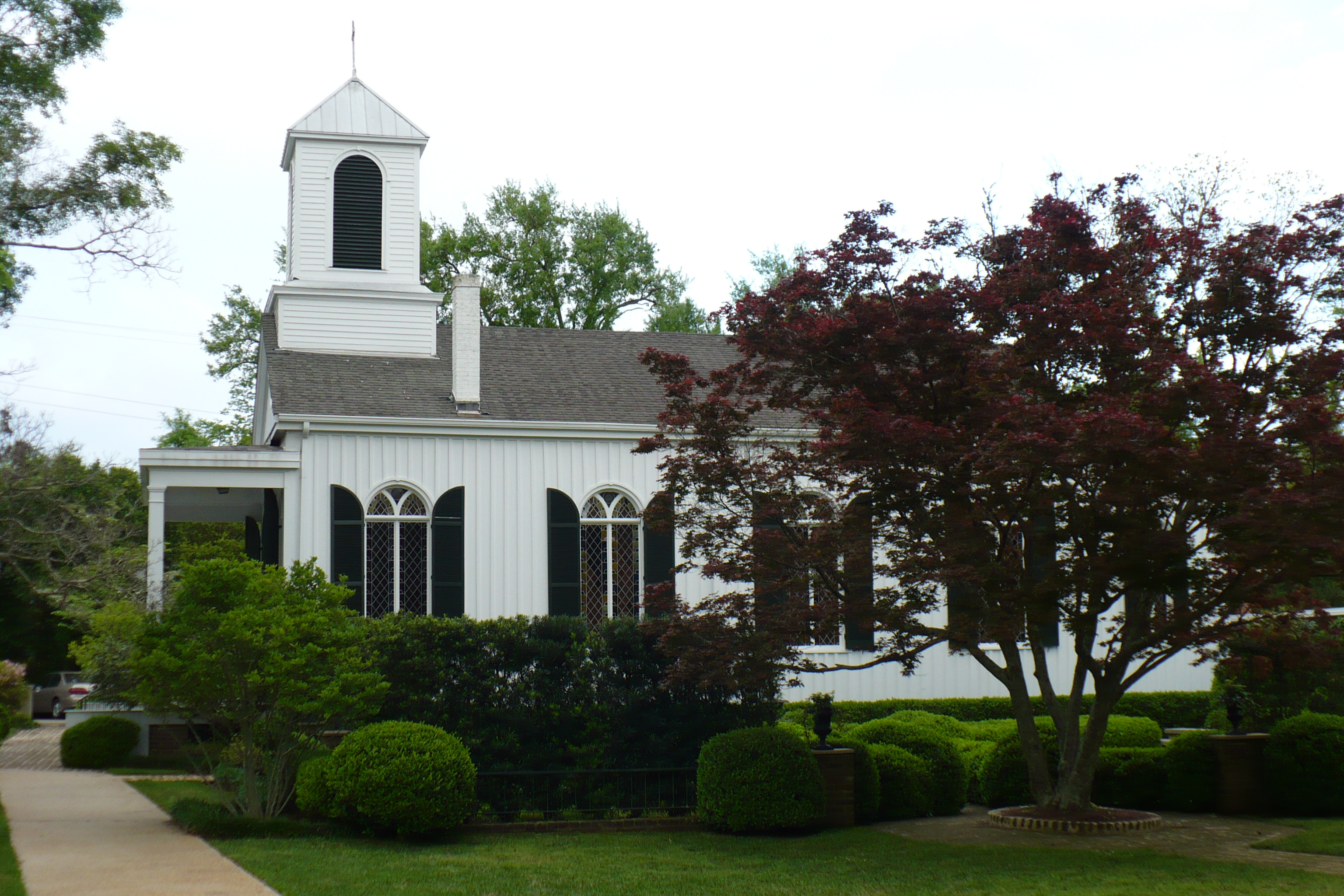
- Saint Paul's Episcopal Chapel in 2008.

- Location within Mobile, Alabama Location within Alabama Location within the United States
- Location: Mobile, Alabama
- Coordinates: 30°41′53″N 88°8′21″W
- Built: 1859
- Architectural style: Late Victorian, Gothic Revival
- MPS: 19th Century Spring Hill Neighborhood TR
- NRHP reference No.: 84000123
- Added to NRHP: October 18, 1984

Saint Paul's Episcopal Chapel is a historic Episcopal church building in Mobile, Alabama, United States. It was built in 1859 in a vernacular Gothic Revival style. The building was placed on the National Register of Historic Places as a part of the 19th Century Spring Hill Neighborhood Thematic Resource on October 18, 1984.
