= Stewartfield (Mobile, Alabama) =

Historic house in Alabama, United States

- U.S. National Register of Historic Places
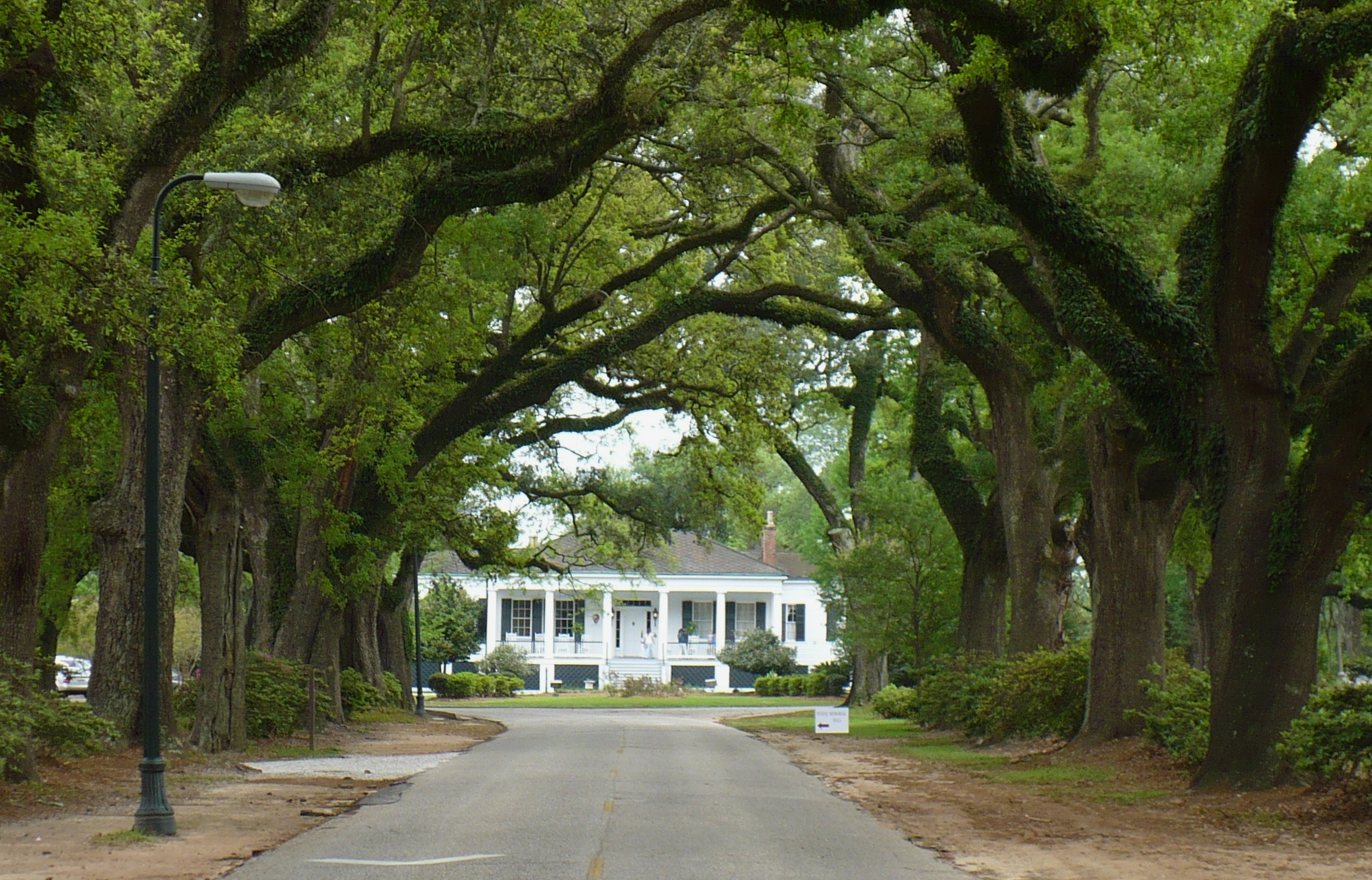
- Stewartfield in 2008.

- Location within Mobile, Alabama Location within Alabama Location within the United States
- Location: Mobile, Alabama
- Coordinates: 30°41′39″N 88°8′32″W
- Built: 1849
- Architectural style: Greek Revival
- MPS: 19th Century Spring Hill Neighborhood TR
- NRHP reference No.: 84000124
- Added to NRHP: October 18, 1984

Stewartfield is a historic residence on the campus of Spring Hill College in Mobile, Alabama, United States. It was built in 1849 in a Greek Revival style. The building was placed on the National Register of Historic Places as a part of the 19th Century Spring Hill Neighborhood Thematic Resource on October 18, 1984.

== See also ==
- Spring Hill College
