= Spring Hill College =

Jesuit college in Mobile, Alabama, US

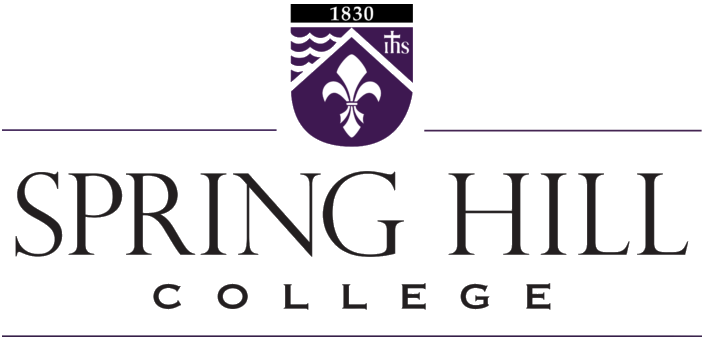
- Motto: In Colle Exaltatus Fons Sapientiae (Latin)
- Motto in English: A Spring of Wisdom Lifted Up on the Hill
- Type: Private college
- Established: 1830; 196 years ago
- Religious affiliation: Catholic (Jesuit)
- Academic affiliations: AJCU
- President: Mary H. Van Brunt
- Students: 927 (fall 2024)
- Undergraduates: 790 (fall 2024)
- Postgraduates: 137 (fall 2024)
- Location: Mobile, Alabama, U.S. 30°41′39″N 88°08′14″W
- Campus: 381 acres (154 ha); Urban - 32 buildings 18-hole golf course
- Colors: Purple and white
- Nickname: Badgers
- Sporting affiliations: NCAA DII SIAC
- Mascot: Beaumont
- Website: shc.edu

Spring Hill College is a private Jesuit college in Mobile, Alabama, United States. It was founded in 1830 by Michael Portier, Bishop of Mobile. Along with being the oldest private college or university in the state of Alabama, it was the first Catholic college in the Deep South, is the fifth-oldest Catholic college in the United States, and is the third-oldest member of the Association of Jesuit Colleges and Universities.

== History ==
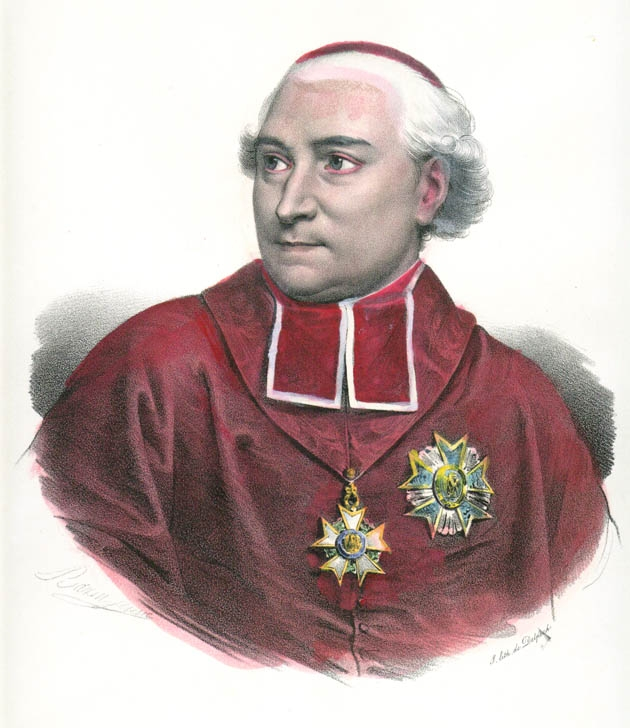
Cardinal Joseph Fesch, an early benefactor of the college

Spring Hill College was founded by the first bishop of Mobile, Michael Portier, who was from France. After purchasing a site for the college on a hill near Mobile, Bishop Portier went to France to recruit teachers and raise funds for the new college. Portier recruited two priests and four seminarians from France to staff the school. A friend of Portier, Cardinal Joseph Fesch, Archbishop of Lyon, was a major benefactor to the fledgling College, donating his philosophical and theological library and various works of art. Pauline Jaricot, founder of the Society of the Propagation of the Faith, donated 38,000 francs, an enormous sum in those days.

The bishop himself taught theology to the ecclesiastical students, who numbered six the first year. Upon his return from France, Portier rented a hotel next to the college grounds and started the first semester on May 1, 1830, with an enrollment of thirty students. On July 4 of the same year, the bishop laid the cornerstone of the first permanent building. It stood on the site of the present Administration Building and opened for classes in November 1831. Spring Hill is the oldest institution of higher education in Alabama and among the oldest colleges in the South. It is the third-oldest Jesuit college in the United States.

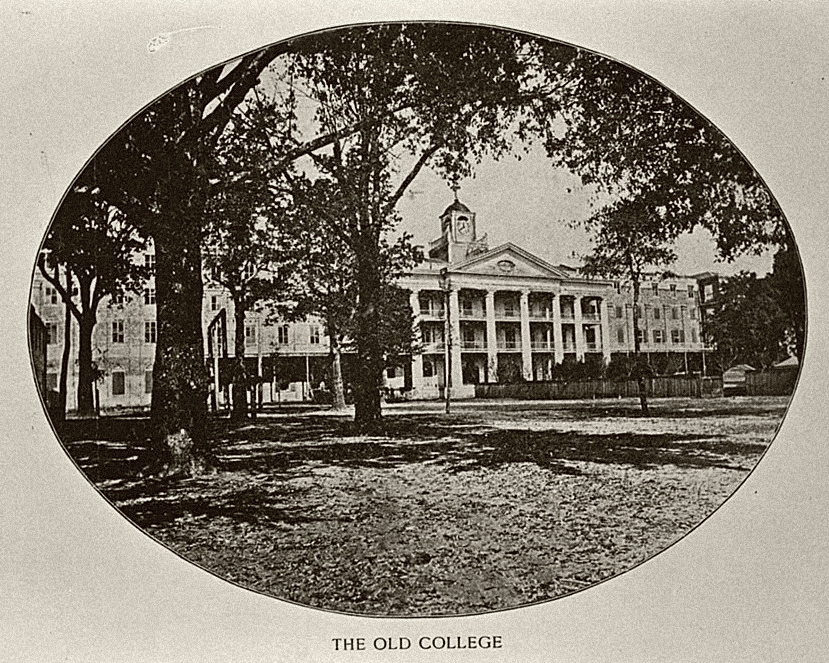
The original main building, built in 1831. From a 1905 picture

In 1836 the governor of Alabama, Clement Comer Clay, signed a legislative act that chartered the college; the following year, four graduates received their degrees.

The first two presidents of the college were called away to be bishops, one to Dubuque, Iowa (Mathias Loras), the other to Vincennes, Indiana (John Stephen Bazin). The third president, Mauvernay, died after a brief term of office. Portier transferred the college, first to the French Fathers of Mercy, and next to the Congregation of Jesus and Mary, but both groups lacked teaching and administrative experience.

He persuaded the Fathers of the Lyon Province of the Society of Jesus (Jesuits) to take possession of the college. The new regime was inaugurated with Francis Gautrelet as president in September 1847. Since that time the institution has continued under Jesuit direction.

Many boys were sent to Spring Hill during the American Civil War as they neared the draft age. But numerous students wanted to be part of the war effort. The college eventually formed two military companies. Some of Spring Hill's Jesuit fathers became chaplains for the Confederacy. A recruiter tried to conscript all forty of the Jesuit brothers at the college into the Confederate Army. The college president, Gautrelet, dispatched an urgent message to the assistant secretary of war in Richmond, who granted a temporary reprieve of the brothers' conscription.

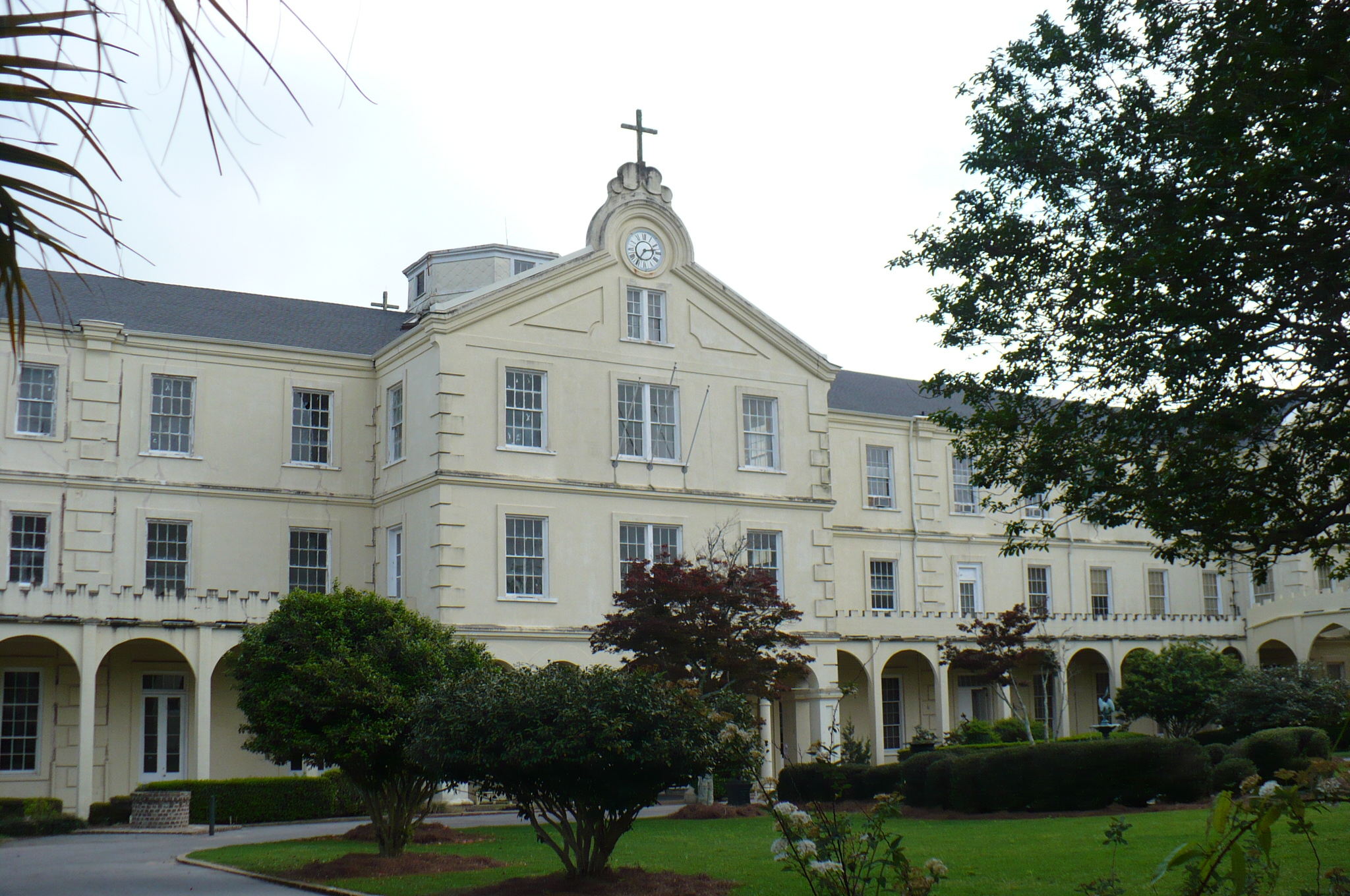
The second main building, now the Rev. Gregory F. Lucey, S.J. Administration Center, built in 1869

During the Reconstruction era, the college recruited students from among the sons of Central American and Cuban leaders. Following student complaints that Spanish was challenging the dominance of English on the campus, the Jesuits organized a Spanish–American league. In 1869 a fire destroyed the main building. Students and faculty had to relocate for a time to St. Charles College in Grand Coteau, Louisiana. John Quinlan and other benefactors assisted in rebuilding the college, which reopened at Spring Hill before the year's end.

As the enrollment increased, Quinlan Hall, St. Joseph's Chapel, the Thomas Byrne Memorial Library, and Mobile Hall were erected. In 1935, the high school, which had been a unit distinct from the college since 1923, was discontinued. In the space vacated by the high school, the Jesuit House of Studies was opened in 1937, and the Scholasticate of the Sacred Heart opened on a site adjoining the college a few years later.

After World War II, a great influx of veterans taxed the facilities of the college, which erected numerous temporary buildings on the campus to handle the new students. At the request of Archbishop Thomas Joseph Toolen of Mobile, the college became co-educational in 1952.

As a Southern college, Spring Hill did not admit black students for the first 124 years of its existence. It played a significant role in educating the region's plantation owners and slave holders, especially in Louisiana, where many wealthy whites were Catholic. It eventually admitted its first black students in September 1954, a few months after the Supreme Court ruling in Brown v. Board of Education (1954) that segregation in public schools was unconstitutional Mrs. Fannie E. Motley was the first black graduate from the institution in 1956.

Even that late start made Spring Hill College comparatively early in educational civil rights for Alabama's African Americans. In his 1963 "Letter from Birmingham Jail," Dr. Martin Luther King Jr. said he "commend[s] the Catholic leaders of this state for integrating Spring Hill College several years ago."

On the night of January 21, 1957, a dozen or more darkened cars entered the main avenue of the college. Ku Klux Klan members tried to set up a kerosene-soaked cross outside Mobile Hall, a dormitory. They were unaware that they were there during finals week. Most of the white, male residents were still awake, studying for exams, and several heard the hammering. Once alerted, students streamed from both ends of the building carrying whatever items were handy as weapons – golf clubs, tennis rackets, bricks, a softball bat – and put the panicked Klansmen to flight. A KKK contingent returned the next night, burning a cross at the gate of the college before students reacted. The following day, a group of students – male and female – hanged a Klansman in effigy at the college gate, with a sign reading, "KKKers ARE CHICKEN."

On July 27, 1963, Lee Harvey Oswald spoke at Spring Hill about life in the Soviet Union, at the invitation of his cousin, a student at the college. His speech was considered controversial because of strong opposition in the United States to communism during the Cold War. His lecture took place months before he assassinated President John F. Kennedy on November 22, 1963.

Following Hurricane Katrina's widespread destruction along the central Gulf Coast in 2005, Spring Hill accepted 117 students, the majority of them from Loyola University in New Orleans, a sister Jesuit institution, for the remainder of the year.

On January 1, 2023, Mary H. Van Brunt became president of Spring Hill College, serving as the college's first female president.

== Student body ==
More than 1,000 students study at Spring Hill College each year, of which more than 56% are from outside Alabama. The student body is 39% male and 61% female; 90% of the freshman class and 70% of the total student body live on campus. Of the students, 38% of them are Catholic. The student-faculty ratio is 13:1, and the average class size is 12. Of faculty members, 91% hold doctorates or the highest degrees in their fields. More than one-third of graduating students continue their education at graduate or professional school.

== Academics ==
Spring Hill College offers undergraduate students bachelor's degrees through a variety of majors. The available departments include the Division of Business, the Communications/Arts Division, International Studies, Interdivisional Studies, Language and Literature Division, Nursing, Philosophy and Theology, Sciences Division, Social Sciences Division, Teacher Education Division, and lastly, the Pre-Professional Programs. Each of these divisions offers a variety of concentrations from which students can choose majors and minors.

Spring Hill has an academic center in Bologna, Italy; it also accepts study abroad students from other colleges and universities.

Areas of concentration in graduate programs include Master of Business Administration, Teacher Education, Master of Liberal Arts, Master of Science in Nursing, Master of Theological Studies, Master of Pastoral Studies, and Master of Arts in Theology. Certificate programs are offered in theology and ministry. An online master's degree program for a Master of Science in Nursing is offered that combines online and offline nursing experience. Through the Cooperative Center for Study Abroad consortium, students may arrange for study abroad programs and internships in England, France, Ireland, Spain, Italy, and Mexico.

== Campus ==
The Spring Hill College campus is located in the Spring Hill neighborhood of Mobile, Alabama. The college has remained on the same campus that Bishop Portier purchased in 1830. A number of its structures are listed on the National Register of Historic Places. They include the Sodality Chapel (built 1850); the Spring Hill College Quadrangle, comprising the Administration Building (1869), St. Joseph's Chapel (1910), and four other structures; and Stewartfield (1849).

Other notable feature of the campus is the Avenue of the Oaks, where graduation traditionally occurs. An 18-hole golf course is used by the team and other students. The historic Administration Building renovation was completed in 2008. It was renamed as "The Gregory F. Lucey, S.J. Administration Center", after the college's 38th president.

=== Gallery ===
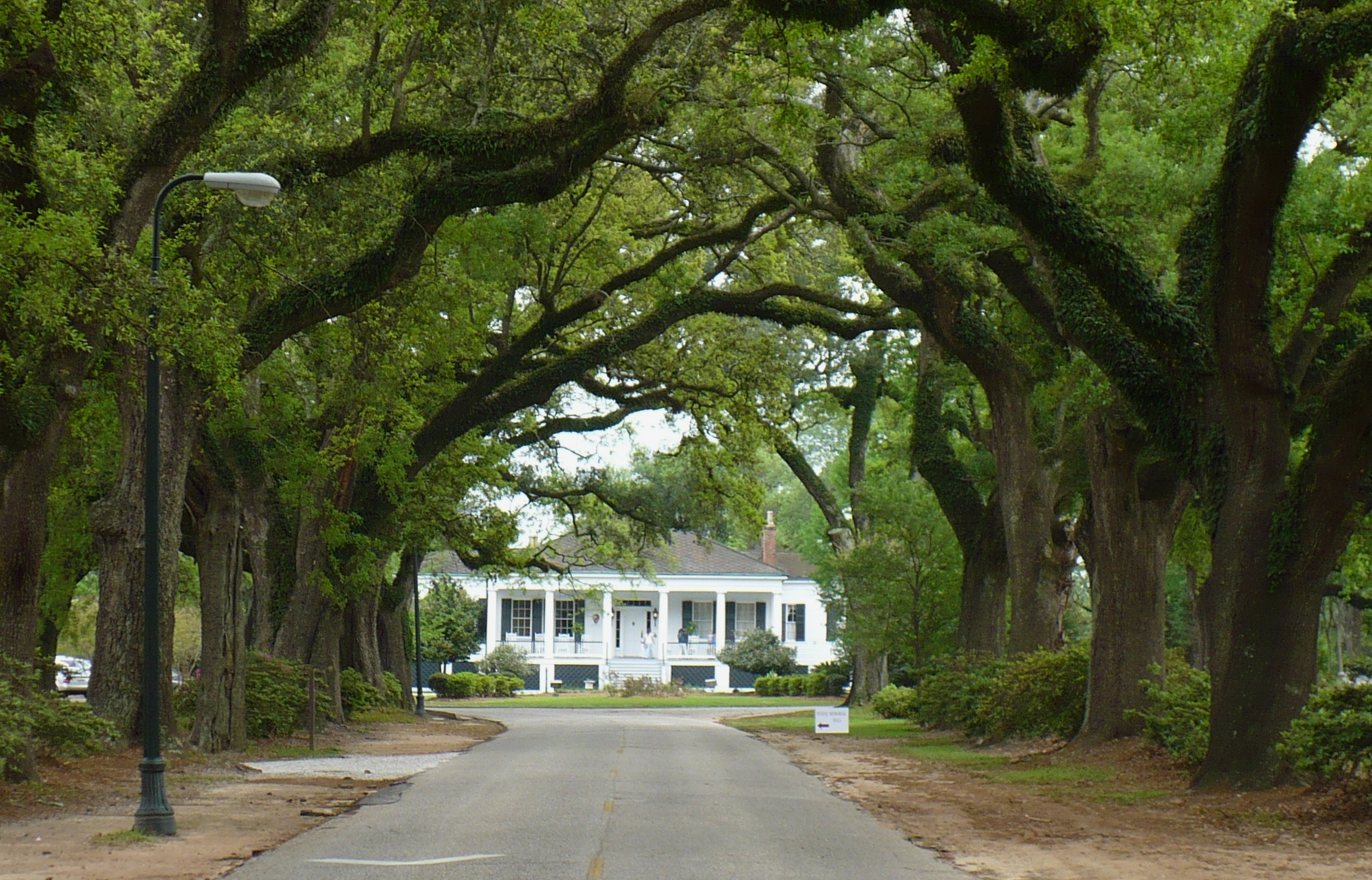
Stewartfield and the Avenue of the Oaks

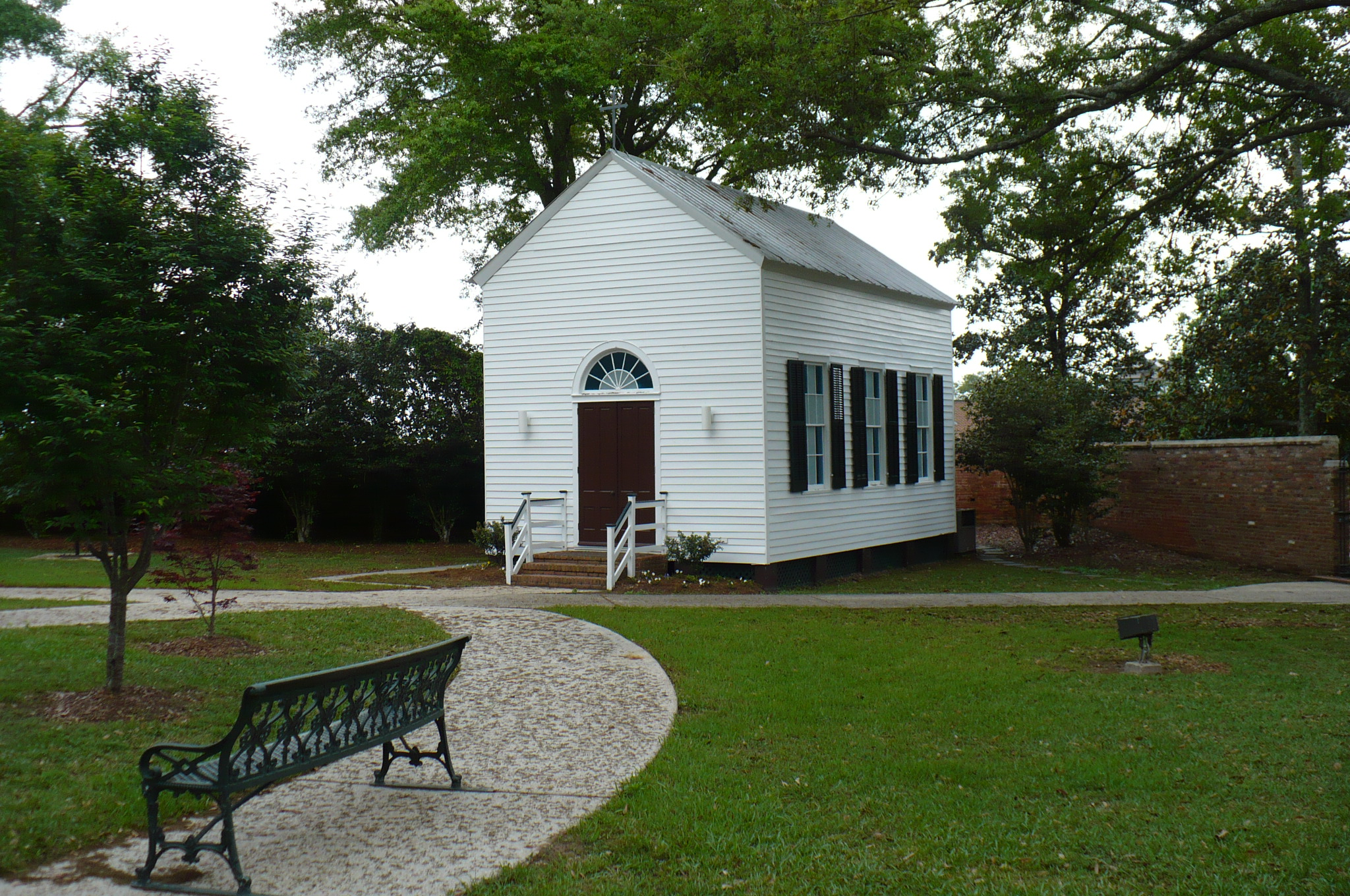
Sodality Chapel, built in 1850

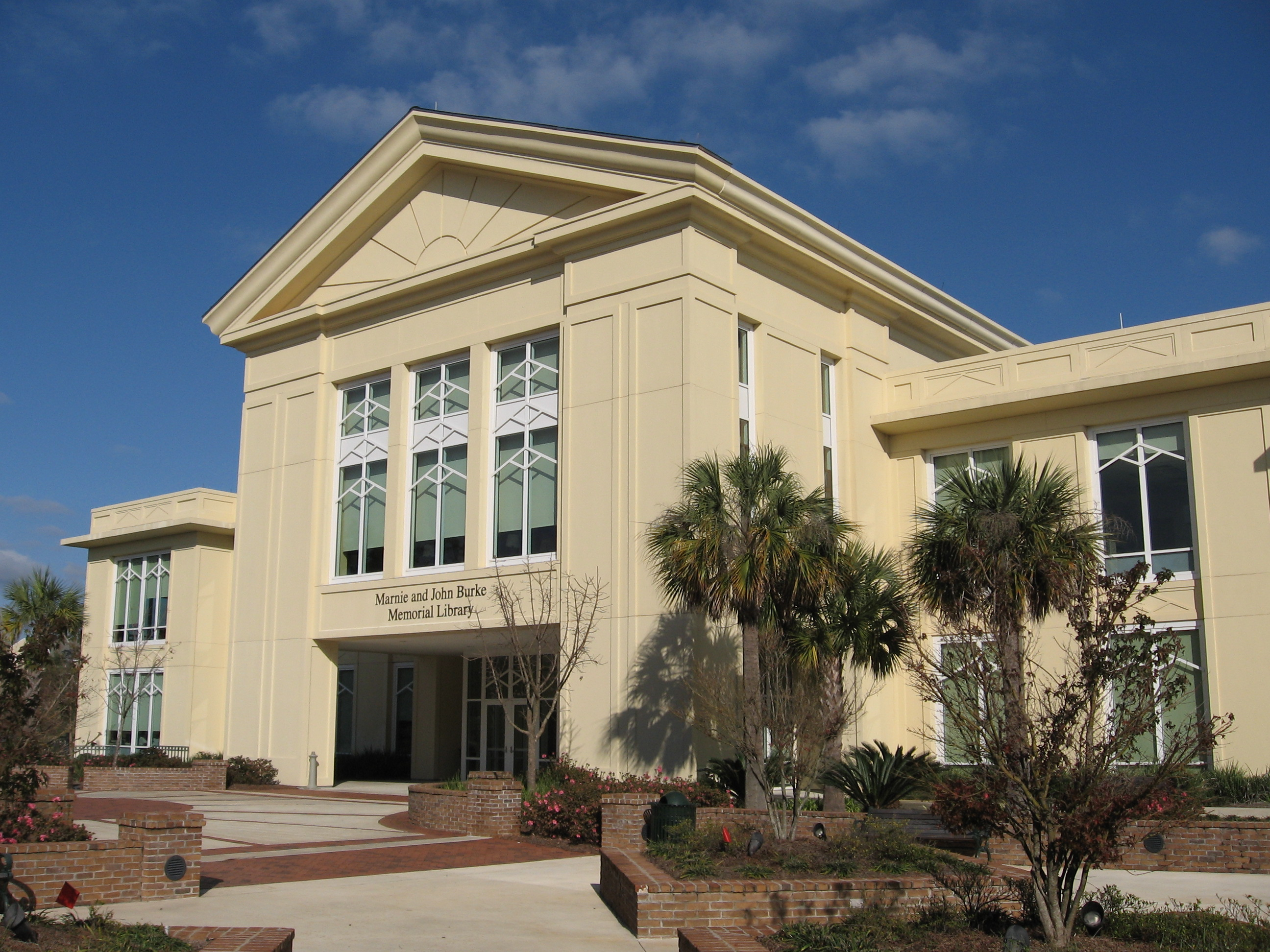
Marnie & John Burke Memorial Library

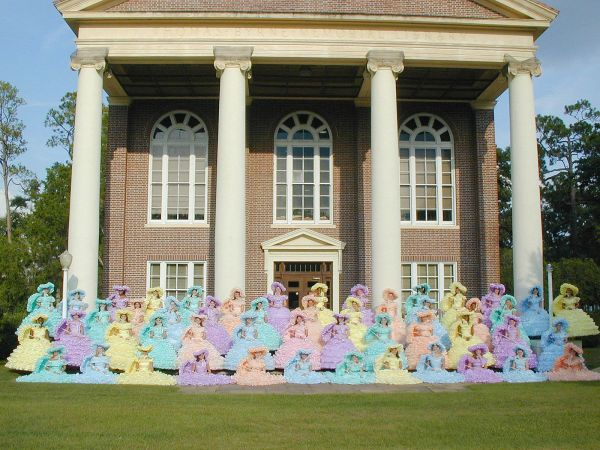
Azalea Trail Maids, formerly the Thomas Byrne Memorial Library

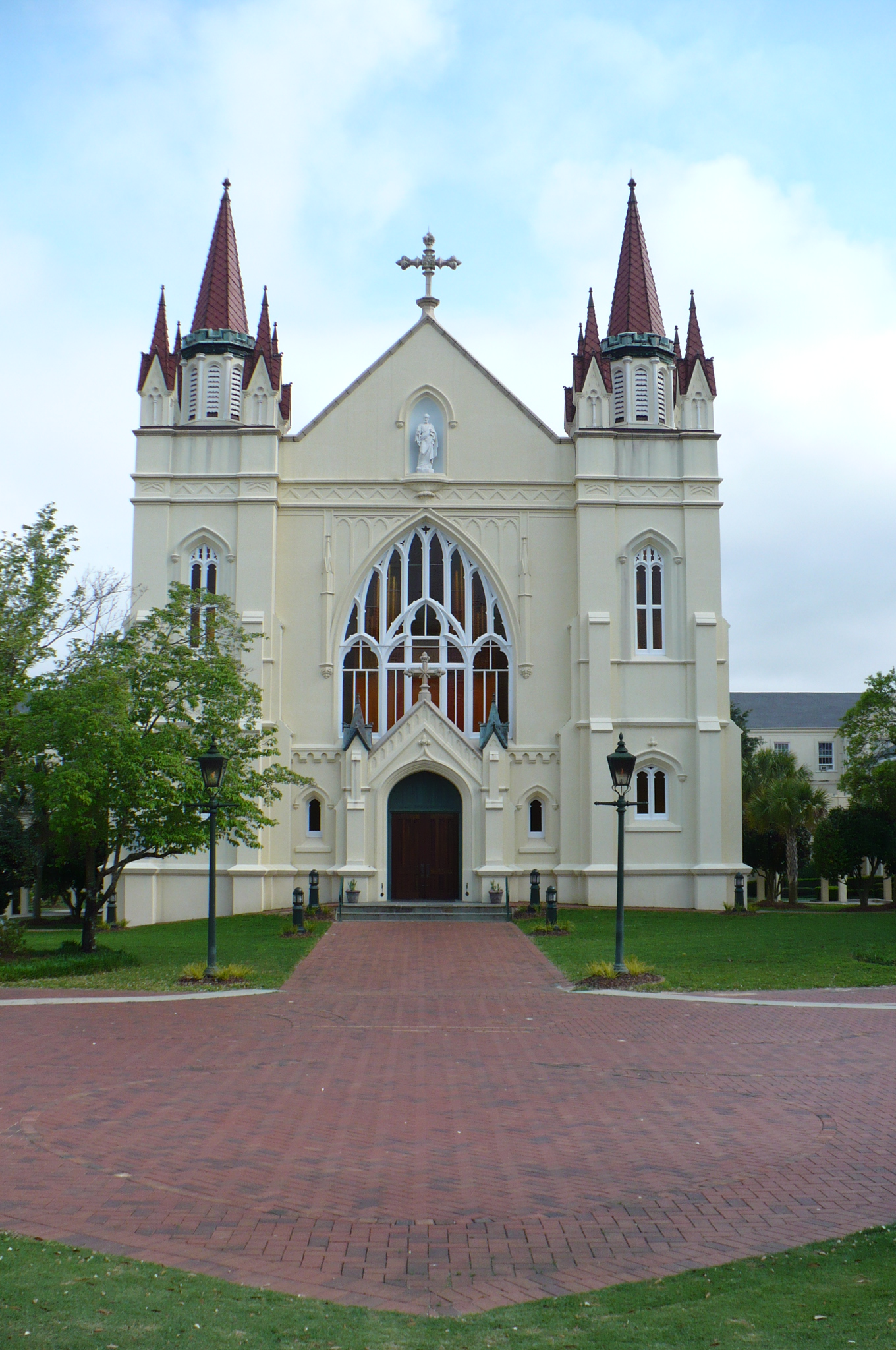
St. Joseph Chapel, built in 1910

== Student life ==
=== Clubs and organizations ===
There are over sixty student-run clubs and organizations at Spring Hill College. They include community service clubs, ministry organizations, athletic and academic clubs.

=== Greek life ===
Spring Hill College has 12 recognized Greek organizations that are represented on the campus.

== Athletics ==
Logo of the Spring Hill Badgers, the athletics teams of the college

The Spring Hill athletic teams are called the Badgers. The college is a member of the Division II level of the National Collegiate Athletic Association (NCAA), primarily competing in the Southern Intercollegiate Athletic Conference (SIAC) for most of its sports since the 2014–15 academic year; while its men's & women's soccer and women's golf teams competes in the Gulf South Conference (GSC). The Badgers previously competed in the Southern States Athletic Conference (SSAC; formerly known as Georgia–Alabama–Carolina Conference (GACC) until after the 2003–04 school year) of the National Association of Intercollegiate Athletics (NAIA) from 2010–11 to 2013–14; and in the NAIA Gulf Coast Athletic Conference (GCAC) from 1981–82 to 2009–10.

Spring Hill competes in 18 NCAA sponsored intercollegiate varsity sports: Men's sports include baseball, basketball, cross country, golf, soccer, tennis and track & field; while women's sports include basketball, beach volleyball, cross country, golf, soccer, softball, tennis, track & field and volleyball; and co-ed sports include cheerleading and dance.

=== Move to NCAA Division II ===
The school formerly competed in the GCAC at the NAIA level. On July 12, 2013, Spring Hill was accepted by the NCAA to begin its process towards joining the NCAA Division II. Spring Hill joined the Southern Intercollegiate Athletic Conference beginning in Fall 2014, becoming the first non-HBCU to join the conference.

On August 11, 2014, the GSC announced that Spring Hill would join the conference as an affiliate member competing in men's and women's soccer and women's golf. Spring Hill began to compete in full schedules starting in 2014, but it was not eligible for post-season play until the 2015–2016 school year.

=== Club sports ===
The college offers club sports in men's and women's bowling as well as eSports.

=== Intramural sports ===
Spring Hill College has a student-run intramural program. The following sports are offered:

- Beach volleyball (4-on-4 Co-Rec, up to 8 on team)
- Basketball (5-on-5)
- Soccer (6-on-6, including the goalie, up to 10 on team)
- Flag football

=== Baseball ===
Spring Hill College has maintained a baseball team since its first intercollegiate play in 1889. Currently, the Spring Hill College baseball team plays its home games at Stan Galle Field ("The Pit"), the oldest continually used college baseball field in the country. Notable baseball alumni include Blake Stein, former pitcher for the Oakland Athletics and Kansas City Royals, Frank Bolling who won a Gold Glove in 1958 as a 2nd baseman with the Detroit Tigers and went on to be a two time All Star selection with the Milwaukee(Atlanta) Braves. Frank's brother Milt Bolling who was an infielder for the Boston Red Sox and Jim Hendry, former general manager of the Chicago Cubs.

=== Rugby ===
Spring Hill moved its college rugby program to varsity sport status under the athletic department to provide more resources and to help boost admissions to the college in 2012. In 2018, the college reassigned the men's and women's rugby teams to club sport status. Spring Hill rugby competes in the small college division.

=== Sailing ===
Spring Hill College won a national championship in sailing in 1986, the North American Intercollegiate Sloop Championship.

== Notable people ==
See List of notable faculty and alumni of Spring Hill College

== See also ==
- List of Jesuit sites
