= Creole architecture in the United States =

Vernacular style of the US Gulf Coast region

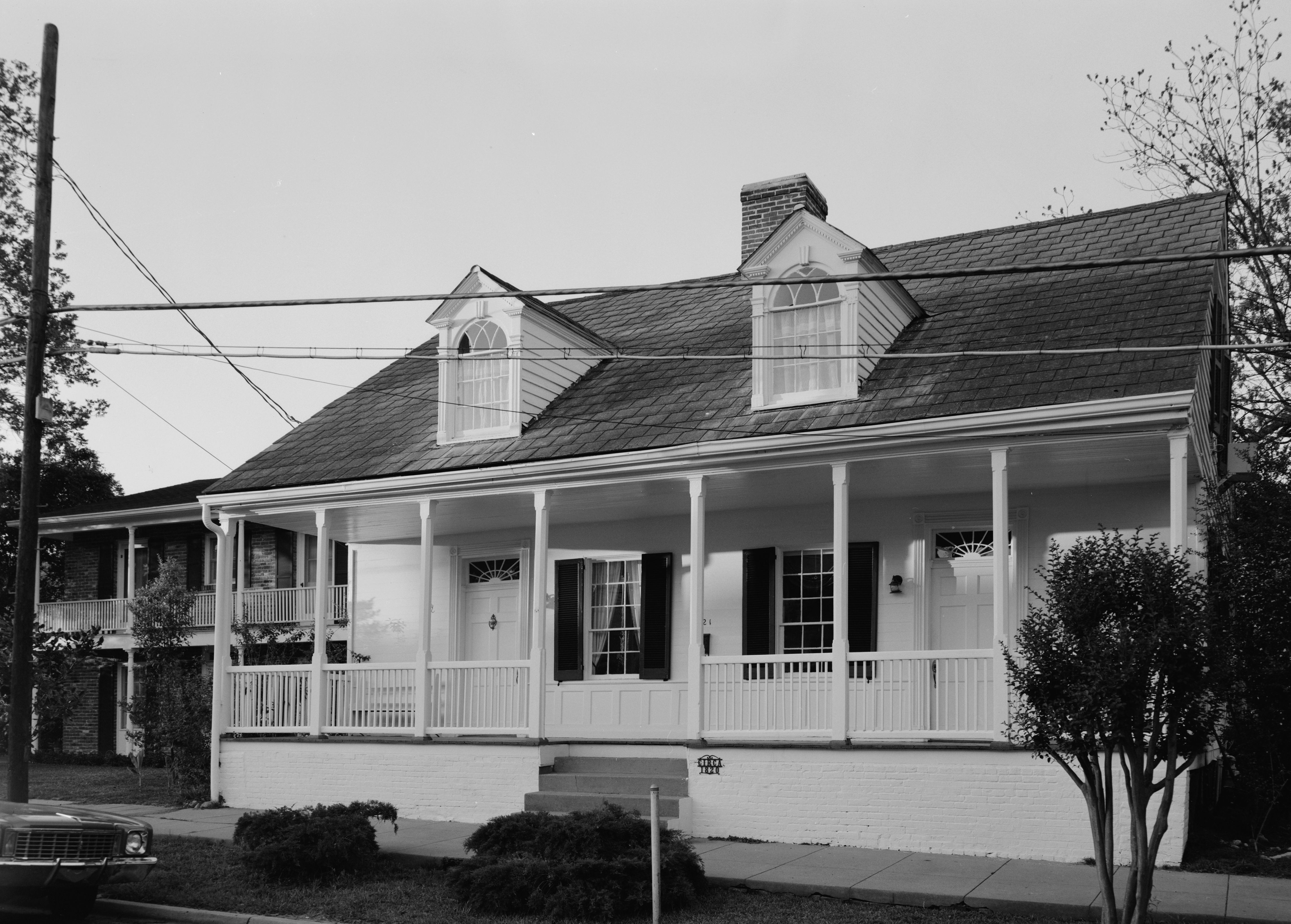
Williamsburg, a late 1830s example of a Creole cottage with neoclassical detailing in Natchez, Mississippi. It features the common features of most Creole cottages: separate entrance doors to each interior room, central chimney, raised basement, and is situated on the front property line.

Creole architecture in the United States is present in buildings in Louisiana and elsewhere in the South, and also in the U.S. associated territories of Puerto Rico and the U.S. Virgin Islands. A variant is Ponce Creole style.

== Creole cottages ==
In the U.S. south, a creole cottage is a type of vernacular architecture indigenous to the Gulf Coast of the United States. The style was a dominant house type along the central Gulf Coast from about 1790 to 1840 in the former settlements of French Louisiana in Alabama, Arkansas, Louisiana, and Mississippi. The style is popularly thought to have evolved from French and Spanish colonial house forms, although historians are uncertain about its origins.

Creole architecture in Louisiana is documented by numerous listings in the U.S. National Register of Historic Places.

The "Creole cottage" type of house was common along the Gulf Coast and associated rivers in the 19th century with a few scattered examples found as far west as Houston, Texas, and as far east as northern Florida, although the majority of structures are found in southern Louisiana eastward to Mobile, Alabama. In Kentucky, a few scattered cottages still stand in the state's far western Jackson Purchase region, where they continued to be built into the early twentieth century.

=== Architectural features ===
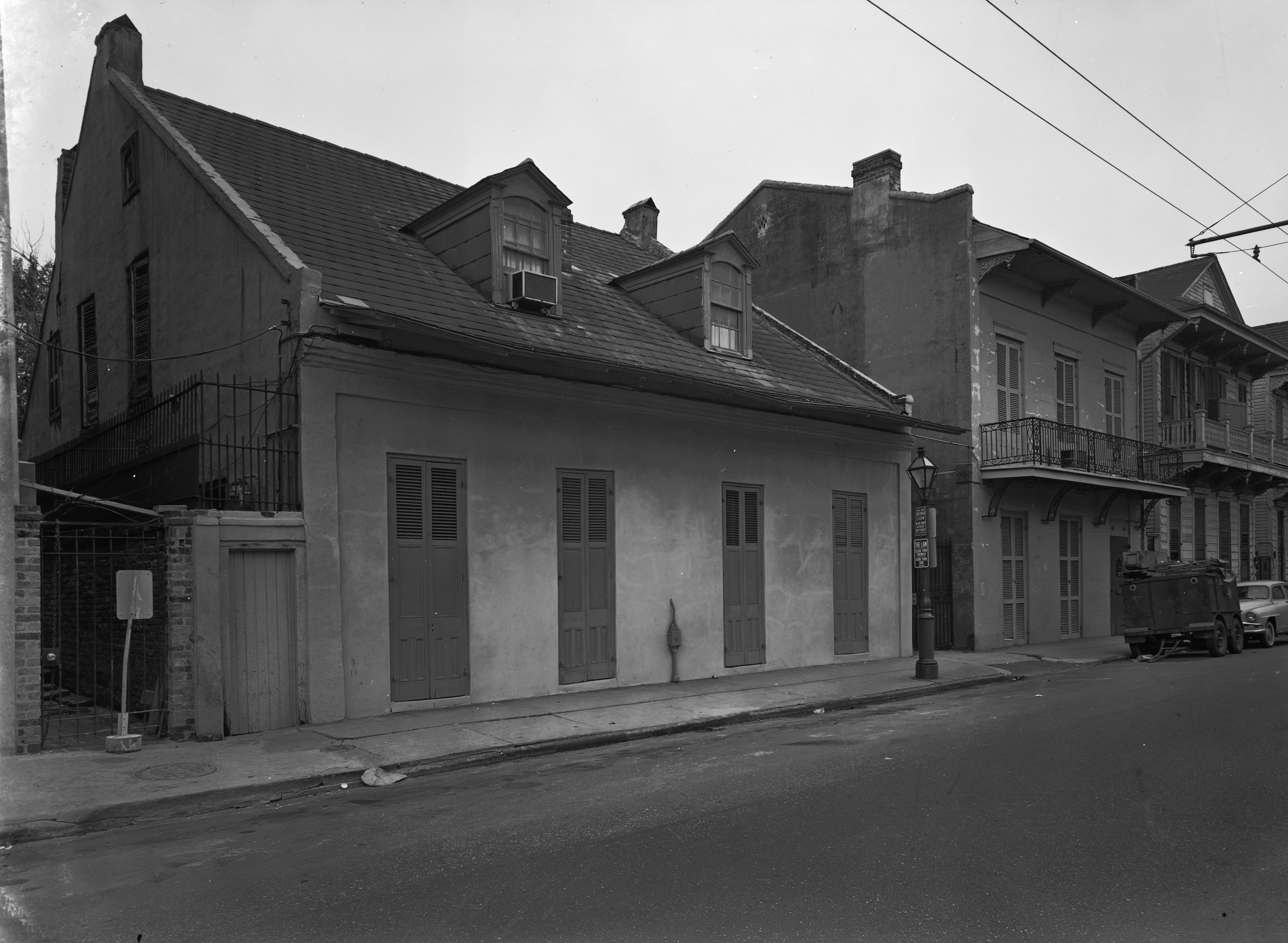
Latour and Laclotte's atelier, the urban form of a Creole cottage in New Orleans.

Two features of this style of house are thought to be influences from other places in France's former colonial empire. The full front porch is believed to originate from the Caribbean islands, while the high gabled roof, the ridge of which is parallel to the street, accommodating the porch as well as the mass of the house, is thought to be of French-Canadian origin. In the earlier or more fundamental examples one or two main rooms may open directly onto the porch. They often feature an interior chimney that pierces the ridge line of the roof, with back-to-back fireplaces serving two rooms. Two common secondary characteristics of this style are a raised basement and the frequent situating of the front of the buildings at the property line.

In the city of New Orleans, the term Creole cottage tends to be more narrowly defined as a 1 1/2-story house with a gabled roof, the ridge of which is parallel to the street. The house normally has four squarish rooms with no hallways and is built up to the front property line. The primary difference between these cottages and those elsewhere is the lack of a full front porch.

A similar house type that some architectural scholars believe is related to the Creole cottage is the Gulf Coast cottage. However, it is not clear if this type is derived from the Creole cottage or if it is a Deep South adaptation of a Tidewater-type cottage. They both display some of the general characteristics of a Creole cottage. In the more formal and later examples, a central hall is almost always present. These more formal examples began to appear in the 1820s and 1830s. They are typically larger with Federal or Greek Revival architectural influences not present in the simpler version. If a central hall is present, then usually it is entered via a central entrance. End-gable chimneys are often present rather than a central one.

== Puerto Rico and U.S. Virgin Islands ==
Ponce Creole, centered in Ponce in southern Puerto Rico, is a distinctive high style reflected in many standing buildings.

An earlier, less formal style, with perhaps less surviving presence, is a "Spanish-Creole" style of which the Juana Rodríguez Morales House in Cayey is an example.

== See also ==
- French Colonial
- Buildings and architecture of New Orleans
  - Hotel St. Pierre
  - Lafitte's Blacksmith Shop
  - Frenchmen Street#Architecture
- Godchaux–Reserve Plantation
- Shotgun house
