= List of Ursinus College people =

== Notable alumni ==
=== Academia ===
- William H. Frey (Class of 1969): noted American demographer and author, Senior Fellow with Brookings Metro at the Brookings Institution
- H. Craig Heller (Class of 1964): professor and chair of Biology at Stanford University; known for work in sleep, circadian rhythms, and thermoregulation
- Sam Keen (Class of 1953): author, professor, and philosopher
- Daniel Reimold (Class of 2003): professor of journalism at Saint Joseph's University
- Ismar Schorsch (Class of 1957): chancellor emeritus of The Jewish Theological Seminary (JTS) and the Rabbi Herman Abramovitz Professor of Jewish history
- Jeff Trinkle (Class of 1979): professor and chair of Computer Science at Rensselaer Polytechnic Institute; known for work in robotic manipulation, multibody dynamics, and automated manufacturing
- Mary H. Van Brunt: economist and academic administrator, 39th president of Spring Hill College
- Robert Yerkes (Class of 1897): psychologist, ethologist and primatologist, worked in intelligence testing and field of comparative psychology; co-developer of Yerkes-Dodson law relating arousal to performance

=== Arts ===
- Larry Crabb (Class of 1965): author, professor and psychologist; founder and director of New Way Ministries
- Jacob G. Francis (Class of 1891): author, historian, Church of the Brethren pastor, founder of Elizabethtown College
- Sam Keen (Class of 1953): author, professor of philosophy and religion, and former contributing editor of Psychology Today
- J.D. Salinger (attended 1937–1938): author, most known for The Catcher in the Rye, Raise High the Roof Beam, Carpenters and Seymour: An Introduction, Franny and Zooey and Nine Stories, a collection of short stories
- Linda Grace Hoyer Updike (Class of 1923): author, mother of John Updike
- Wesley Updike (Class of 1923): teacher, father of John Updike

=== Athletics ===
- John W. Anderson (Class of 1953): football coach for Brown Bears football
- Reds Bassman (Class of 1936): football player for the Philadelphia Eagles
- B. J. Callaghan (Class of 2002): soccer coach, United States men's national soccer team
- Steve Donahue (Class of 1984): men's head basketball coach at The University of Pennsylvania
- Raymond G. Gettell (Class of 1904): football coach at Trinity College
- Tom Gormley (Class of 1917): player in American Professional Football League (which became the NFL in 1922) with Canton Bulldogs, Cleveland Tigers, Washington Senators and New York Brickley Giants
- Vonnie Gros (Class of 1958): head coach of the U.S. women's national field hockey team, Olympic bronze medalist.
- Paul Guenther (Class of 1993): defensive coordinator for NFL's Oakland Raiders
- Jing Johnson (Class of 1916): pitched in Major League Baseball for Philadelphia Athletics
- Ted Kershner (Class of 1960): football coach at Rowan University
- Erma Keyes (1926–1999): All-American Girls Professional Baseball League player
- Ronald C. Kichline (Class of 1915): football coach at Juniata College
- James J. Lorimer (Class of 1951): creator of Arnold Sports Festival, member of the International Sports Hall of Fame
- Dorothy McKnight (Class of 1957): executive director of the United States Women's Lacrosse Association and the National Association for Girls and Women in Sport
- Ralph Mitterling (Class of 1914): professional baseball player for the Philadelphia Athletics, baseball coach at University of Pittsburgh
- Joan Moser (Class of 1968): member of the U.S. women's national field hockey team and inaugural inductee into the U.S. Field Hockey Association Hall of Fame
- Dan Mullen (Class of 1994): current head coach for the UNLV Rebels football; former head coach for University of Florida and Mississippi State University football teams
- Earl Potteiger (Class of 1905): professional football player-coach for the New York Giants
- Jay Repko (Class of 1981): professional football player for the Philadelphia Eagles
- Debbie Ryan (Class of 1975): former head coach for women's basketball team at University of Virginia; member of Women's Basketball Hall of Fame
- Bob Shoudt (Class of 1988): professional competitive eater, aka Notorious B.O.B.
- Dean Steward (Class of 1938): professional football player, member of "Steagles", team that resulted from temporary merger between Philadelphia Eagles and Pittsburgh Steelers due to league-wide manning shortages in 1943 brought on by World War II
- N. Kerr Thompson (Class of 1912): football coach for Slippery Rock

=== Business ===
- Joseph DeSimone (Class of 1986): chemical engineer, CEO of Carbon; 2008 recipient of Lemelson–MIT Prize, 2016 recipient of National Medal of Technology and Innovation
- Cynthia Fisher (Class of 1983): biotechnology entrepreneur

=== Government and public service ===
- Alfred Alspach (Class of 1933): founder of Boys & Girls Club of Lancaster, Pennsylvania
- John R. Brooke: Union general of American Civil War and Spanish–American War
- Raymond Bunt (Class of 1966): Republican member of the Pennsylvania House of Representatives
- Barrie Ciliberti (Class of 1957): Maryland House of Delegates legislator and Reagan administration appointee
- Ryan Costello (Class of 1999): former U.S. representative for Pennsylvania's 6th congressional district (2015–2019)
- J. William Ditter Jr. (Class of 1943): judge of the United States District Court for the Eastern District of Pennsylvania
- Hermann Eilts (Class of 1943): former U.S. ambassador to Saudi Arabia and Egypt who assisted Henry Kissinger's Mideast shuttle diplomacy effort, worked with Egyptian President Anwar el-Sadat throughout the Camp David Accords, and dodged a Libyan hit team
- John Fichter (Class of 1975): Republican member of Pennsylvania House of Representatives
- George Geist (Class of 1977): Republican politician, served in New Jersey State Senate
- Margaret H. George (Class of 1949): author and Democratic member of the Pennsylvania House of Representatives
- Kim Guadagno (Class of 1980), former lieutenant governor of New Jersey
- Steve Malagari (Class of 2005): Democratic member of the Pennsylvania House of Representatives for the 53rd district
- Joseph Melrose (Class of 1966): former U.S. ambassador to Sierra Leone
- Alan Novak (Class of 1971): attorney and former chairman of Republican State Committee of Pennsylvania
- William Preston Snyder: former president pro tempore of the Pennsylvania Senate and Pennsylvania Auditor General
- Linda M. Springer (Class of 1977): director of United States Office of Personnel Management
- Lloyd H. Wood: 20th lieutenant governor of Pennsylvania

=== Religion ===
- Ann Allebach (Class of 1896): first woman ordained as a Mennonite minister in North America
- John F. Funk (Class of 1857): publisher and leader of the Mennonite Church
- Robert W. Ihloff (Class of 1964): thirteenth bishop of the Episcopal Diocese of Maryland
- Ismar Schorsch (Class of 1957): chancellor emeritus of The Jewish Theological Seminary and the Rabbi Herman Abramovitz Professor of Jewish history
- Pierce E. Swope (Class of 1906): American German Reformed clergyman and prominent author in the Pennsylvania German language

=== Science and medicine ===
- Gerald Edelman (Class of 1950): winner of 1972 Nobel Prize in medicine
- Norman E. Gibbs (Class of 1964): software engineer, scholar and educational leader
- Teru Hayashi (Class of 1938): Columbia University biologist, Fulbright Scholar, Guggenheim Fellow and Humboldt Fellow

== Faculty ==
- Raymond Dodge: experimental psychologist, appointed professor of Philosophy in 1896
- Rene Joyeuse: M.D., MS, FACS (17 January 1920 – 12 June 2012); Swiss, French and American soldier, physician, researcher; co-founder of the American Trauma Society who distinguished himself as an OSS agent/operator of Allied intelligence in German-occupied France during World War II; taught French at the college (1941–1942)
- John Mauchly: physicist who, along with J. Presper Eckert, designed ENIAC, the first general purpose electronic digital computer, as well as EDVAC, BINAC and UNIVAC I, the first commercial computer made in the United States; while professor of Physics at Ursinus (1933–1941), developed and tested digital electronic calculating devices at Ursinus's science labs in Pfahler Hall, which still stands on campus (see gallery, below)
- Royal Meeker: statistician; taught at Ursinus from 1906 until his appointment by President Wilson as commissioner of Labor Statistics in 1913; served as Pennsylvania secretary of Labor and Industry (1923–1924)
- Joseph Melrose: former U.S. ambassador to Sierra Leone (1998–2001); ambassador-in-residence of the school's International Relations Program
- Deborah Poritz: jurist; attorney general of New Jersey (1994–1996), chief justice of the New Jersey Supreme Court (1996–2006); taught English literature at Ursinus in the late 1960s
