= Kershner =

Kershner is a surname. Notable people with the surname include:

- Bruce Kershner (1950–2007), American environmentalist
- Irvin Kershner (1923–2010), American film director
- Isabel Kershner, British-Israeli journalist
- Jason Kershner (born 1976), American baseball pitcher
- Shannon Kershner, American Presbyterian pastor
- Ted Kershner (born 1938), American football player and coach

== See also ==
- Kirshner
