= USA Field Hockey Hall of Fame =

Organization honoring field hockey athletes and coaches

- Type: Hall of fame
- Headquarters: Ursinus College, Collegeville, Pennsylvania, U.S.
- Coordinates: 40.191°N 75.454°W

The USA Field Hockey Hall of Fame honors the achievements of athletes and/or coaches of USA field hockey teams. The permanent home of USA Field Hockey's hall of fame is located at Ursinus College, Collegeville, Pennsylvania.

== Hall of Fame Inductees ==
The members of the Hall of Fame, and the year of induction, are:

1988

- Ruth Heller Aucott
- Adele Boyd
- Robin Cash
- Gertrude Dunn
- Frances Elliott
- Vonnie Gros
- Mary Ann Leight Harris
- Phyllis Stadler Lyon
- Betty C. Miller
- Joan Moser
- Patricia Kenworthy Nuckols
- Elenore Pepper
- Chickie Geraci Poisson
- F. Elizabeth Richey
- Alison Hersey Risch
- Nancy Sawin
- Betty Shellenberger
- Barbara Strebeigh
- Joan Edenborn Stiles
- Bonnie Smith Taylor
- Anne B. Townsend
- Anne McConaghie Volp
- Alice Putnam Willetts

1989

- Gwen Cheeseman Alexander
- Beth Anders
- Gwen Cheeseman
- Anita Corl Huntsman
- Jill Grant Lindenfeld
- Chris Larson Mason
- Charlene Morett
- Karen C. Shelton
- Julie Staver

1994

- Beth Beglin
- Sheryl Johnson
- Marcy Place

2004

- Leslie Lyness
- Laurel Hershey Martin
- Barbara Marois
- Christy Morgan
- Marcia Pankratz
- Patricia Shea
- Pam Neiss Stuper

2014

- 1984 U.S. Women's Olympic Bronze Medal Team
- Katie Kauffman Beach
- Pam Bustin
- Tracey Fuchs
- Kate "Tiki" Kinnear
- Jill Reeve
- Nigel Traverso

2016

- 1975 West Chester State College National Championship Team
- Kris Fillat (Buchanan)
- Manzar Iqbal
- Kelli James
- Carrie Lingo
- Antoinette Lucas
- Dina Rizzo

2018

- Steve Danielson
- Keli Smith Puzo
- Amy Tran Swenson

2022

- Larry Amar
- Lauren Crandall Liska
- Rachel Dawson

2024

- Patrick Cota
- Kelly Doton
- Katelyn Falgowski-Ginolfi
- Dr. Christine Grant

2025

- Judith Davidson
- Tom Harris
- Beverly Johnson
- Jenepher Shillingford
- Sharon Taylor

2026

- Katie O'Donnell Bam
- Jackie Briggs
- Renee Chatas
- Pam Hixon
- Ben Maruquin
- Alva Serrette

== Hall of Fame Honorary Members ==
The members of the Hall of Fame Honorary Members, and the year of induction, are:

1922

- Helen G. Armfield
- Hilda Burr (England)
- H. Crawhall-Wilson
- Gertrude East
- Nan Hunt
- G.M. Inglis
- Sophie Pearson
- Cecily Warner

1926

- Constance M. K. Applebee
- Helen Ferguson
- Mrs. Edward B. Krumbhaar

1929

- Cynthia Wesson

1933

- Anne B. Townsend

1937

- W. A. Baumann
- Hilda Light
- Edith Thompson

1939

- Gertrude Hooper

1946

- Anne G. Toomey

1949

- May P. Fogg

1950

- Sylvia Hoffa

1952

- Helen Bina
- Barbara Strebeigh

1953

- Anne Lee Delano

1955

- Frances Pierce

1956

- Elizabeth Burger Jackson

1957

- Anna Espenschade
- Alfreda Mosscrop
- Marion Pettit
- Bessis Rudd

1959

- Betty Richey
- Harriet Wilson

1960

- Marjorie Strang

1962

- Betty Shellenberger

1963

- Joyce Gran Barry
- Ethlyn A. Davis
- Frances Homer
- Harriet H. Rogers

1964

- Sophie Dickson

1967

- Frances Blomfield

1968

- Ethel Kloberg
- Nancy Sawin

1971

- Grace Robertson
- Bess Taylor

1972

- Carol Haussermann
- Elizabeth Williams

1973

- Audrey Erickson

1973

- Audrey Erickson

1974

- Jen Shillingford
- Jackie Westervelt

1978

- Phyllis Weikert

1982

- Anne LeDuc
- Bea Toner

1985

- Sally Wilkins

1986

- Ellen Hawver

1991

- Bev Johnson

2004

- Pat Hayes
- Ruth Lajoie
- Leslie Milne

2014

- Tom Harris
- Pam Hixon
- Steve Jennings
- Linda Kreiser
- Sharon Taylor

2016

- Karen Collins
- Roque Viegas
- Allan Woods

2018

- Helen Allen
- Barb Carreiro

2022

- Barbara Longstreth
- Aaron Sher

== See also ==
- List of sports awards honoring women
- NCAA Women's Field Hockey Championship
