= Speedball =

Speedball may refer to:

== Games ==
- Speedball (paintball), a paintball game variant
- Speedball (video game), a 1988 video game by Bitmap Brothers

== Music ==
- "Speedball", a song by Black Label Society from 1919 Eternal
- "Speedball", jazz composition by Lee Morgan, originally appearing on The Gigolo and later on Live at the Lighthouse
- "Speedball", a song by John Zorn from Naked City
- "Speedball", a song by Yeat from Lyfestyle

== Sports ==
- Speedball (American ball game), a combination of handball and soccer
- Speed-ball, an Egyptian racquet sport
- Speedball (boxing), a small punching bag used by boxers for training

== Other ==
- Speedball (drug), a mix of heroin and cocaine, or similar drugs
- Speedball (art products), an American art products manufacturer
- Robbie Baldwin, a Marvel Comics superhero known as "Speedball", formerly known as Penance
- "Speedball" Mike Bailey, a professional wrestler
