= Mary Harris =

Mary Harris may refer to:

- Mary Ann Harris Gay (1829–1918), American writer and poet
- Mary Ann Leight Harris (born 1939), American field hockey player and coach
- Mary Belle Harris (1874–1957), American prison administrator and reformer
- Mary K. Harris (1905–1966), British children's writer
- Mary Harris Armor (1863–1950), American temperance leader
- Mary Harris Jones (1837–1930), Irish-born American community organiser
- Mary Harris Smith (1844–1934), English accountant and entrepreneur
- Mary Harris Thompson (1829–1895), American physician
- Mary Harris (murderer), American murderer
- Mary Harris (musician), American member of the music group Ambrosia
- Mary Harris (public servant), New Zealand cricketer and public servant, clerk of the House of Representatives
- Mary Harris Memorial Chapel of the Holy Trinity
- Mary Lee Cagle (1864–1955), married name Mary Harris, pastor
- Mary O'Brien Harris (1865–1938), British politician
- Mary Packer Harris (1891–1978), Scottish artist and art teacher
- Mary Styles Harris (born 1949), American biologist and geneticist
- Mary Virginia Harris (1911–2004), American veteran of World War II
- Mel Harris (Mary Ellen Harris, born 1956), American actress
- Mary Dormer Harris (1867–1936), British local historian

== See also ==
- Mary Harris, a character in He's Just Not That Into You
- Mary (name)
- Harris (surname)
