= Ruth Heller =

Ruth Heller may refer to:

- Ruth Heller (author) (1923–2004), children's author and graphic artist
- Ruth Heller (statistician), Israeli statistician and professor
- Ruth Heller Aucott (born c. 1934), née Heller, American field hockey player and official
