= Nancy Sawin =

American artist, historian, and field hockey player

- Born: June 21, 1917; Wilmington
- Died: April 18, 2008 (aged 90)

Nancy Churchill Sawin (June 21, 1917 – April 18, 2008) was an American artist, local historian, educator, and field hockey player in Delaware.

== Early life and education ==
Nancy Churchill Sawin was born on June 21, 1917, in Wilmington, Delaware. She was the daughter of Sanford Wales Sawin, a civil engineer, and Ellen Quigley Sawin, one of the first women in Delaware to earn a master's degree and the daughter of suffragist leader Ada Gould Quigley. Sanford and Ellen Sawin founded the Sanford School, a prep school in Hockessin, Delaware, in 1930.

Sawin's peripatetic schooling began in public school in Marshallton, Delaware, then she received a scholarship to attend the Tower Hill School in Wilmington for third through seventh grades. After a year at Misses Hebb's School in Wilmington, she attended high school at the Principia School, a Christian Scientist institution in St. Louis, Missouri.

Sawin earned a bachelor's degree in art in 1938 from Principia College, a master's degree in American history from the University of Delaware in 1940, and an Ed.D. in education administration from the University of Pennsylvania in 1962.

In 1938, she began working for the Sanford School, teaching and coaching a number of sports, including field hockey, tennis, softball, basketball, riding, and lacrosse, and serving as head of the school from 1961 to 1974.

== Field hockey ==
Sawin began playing field hockey in the third grade. She was named to the All-American Team seven times from 1948 to 1959, serving as captain twice and coach once. In addition to her coaching at Sanford, she coached for over 20 years at Constance Applebee's intensive field hockey summer camps. She also served as president of the Delaware Field Hockey Association, the United States Field Hockey Association, and the International Federation of Women's Hockey Associations.

Sawin was inducted into the Delaware Sports Hall of Fame in 1977, and the Hall of Fame of Delaware Women in 1981. Sawin was one of the first group of inductees into the USA Field Hockey Hall of Fame in 1988.

== Art and history ==
As a child, Sawin took lessons from artist Frank Schoonover. Throughout her life she traveled regularly with a sketchpad. Shortly before retirement, she travelled to Europe and had her first art show "on a clothesline outside a small condo on the Mediterranean." In retirement, she began publishing a series of books about local history in Delaware, including her own sketches of historic homes, buildings, and other structures, including mailboxes and outhouses.

== Death ==
Nancy C. Sawin died on 18 April 2008 at the age of 90.

== Bibliography ==
- Playing Hockey, Four Fundamentals of Hockey. 1958 (with Constance M. K. Applebee)
- Playing Hockey, If You Play Forward. 1958 (with Constance M. K. Applebee)
- History of Sanford School, 1930-1970. 1970
- Delaware Sketchbook. 1976 (with Janice M. Carper).
- Backroading Through Cecil County, Md. 1977. (with Esther R. Perkins).
- (illustrator) Man-O-War, My Island Home. 1977 by Haziel Albury.
- Between the Bays. 1978 (with Janice M. Carper)
- (illustrator) Bandages of Soft Illusion, 1979, by Paul J. Wingate
- RFD Country Art. 1979.
- Up the Spine and Down the Creek. 1982.
- Canal Town. 1983 (with Esther R. Perkins).
- Locks, Traps, and Corners. 1984.
- Brick and Ballast. 1985 (with Janice M. Carper).
- China Sketchbook. 1985.
- A Hockessin Diary. 1987.
- Privy to the Council, Seats of Yore. 1987.
- (illustrator) New Sweden on the Delaware, 1988, by Clinton A. Weslager.
- The Oulde King's Roade. 1989.
- North from Wilmington by Olde Roades and Turnpikes. 1992.
- Once Upon a Time in the Countryside. 1994.
- Sketches of Early Delaware Main Streets. 1997.
- Delaware USA. 1999.
