= Alspach =

Alspach is a surname. Notable people with the surname include:

- Alfred Alspach (1912–2002), American politician and civic leader
- Brian Alspach (born 1938), American mathematician
- Ted Alspach (born 1968), American board game designer and author
