= Phyllis Stadler Lyon =

American field hockey player

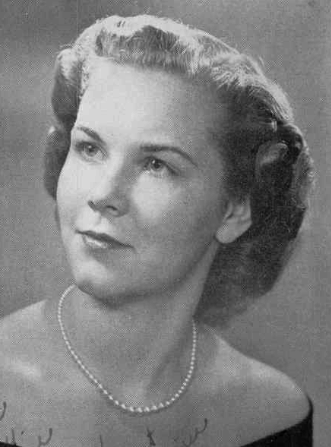
- Phyllis Stadler, from 1952 Linden Leaves

Phyllis Stadler Lyon, formerly Phyllis Marie Stadler, is an American former field hockey player who played on the U.S. women's national field hockey team from 1958 to 1965. She was in the first class of inductees into the U.S. Field Hockey Association Hall of Fame.

== Early years ==
A native of Rumson, New Jersey, she is the daughter of Mr. and Mrs. Henry R. Stadler. She graduated from Rumson-Fair Haven Regional High School. She then attended a four-year college preparatory course at Linden Hall from which she graduated in 1952. While at Linden Hall, she was president of the activities council, vice president of her class, and won varsity letters in basketball, field hockey, volleyball, swimming, tennis, and table tennis. She had then compiled more activity points than any other girl in the school's history. She later attended Ursinus College, graduating in 1956.

== Professional and athletic career ==
After graduating from college, Lyon became a teacher at Audubon High School in Audubon, New Jersey. She played as a center forward for the U.S. women's national field hockey team from 1958 to 1965. She played in international tournaments in the Netherlands, South Africa, England, and Jamaica. She was also the leading scorer at the 1961 U.S. Women's Field Hockey Association's national tournament.

== Later years and honors ==
In January 1988, she was inducted into the U.S. Field Hockey Association Hall of Fame at Ursinus College in Collegeville, Pennsylvania. She was one of the 23 charter inductees in the Hall. She was also inducted into the Ursinus College Hall of Fame for Athletics. As of 1998, she resided in Atlantis, Florida.
