= Carleton Sprague Smith =

American historian, musicologist and writer

- Born: 8 August 1905; New York City
- Died: 19 September 1994 (aged 89); Washington, Connecticut
- Occupations: music librarian, musicologist

Carleton Sprague Smith (August 8, 1905 – September 19, 1994) was an American music librarian and musicologist.

== Early years and education ==
Smith was born in New York City to Clarence Bishop Smith, an admiralty lawyer and Catherine Cook Smith, author and patron of the arts. In 1917, at age twelve Smith took up study of the flute with Georges Barrère at the Institute of Musical Art (later the Juilliard School). For high school he attended the Hackley School from 1920 to 1922. Upon graduation, he went to France to study French at École Yersin and flute with Louis Fleury in Paris. In 1923 he entered Harvard University, while studying flute with Georges Laurent, principal flutist of the Boston Symphony Orchestra. Though he began with an interest in French, he gravitated to the study of Spanish and Portuguese literature and history. He graduated Harvard with a Bachelor of Arts degree in 1927 and a Master of Arts degree in 1928. In 1928 he began study at the University of Vienna, obtaining his doctorate in 1930 with his dissertation Ein Vetternzwist im Hause Habsburg concerning rivalries between seventeenth-century Austrian and Spanish Habsburgs. The same year he served as vice-chairman of the Committee on Inter-American Relations in the field of music for the United States Department of State.

== Career ==
Returning to New York City in 1931, Smith commenced teaching in the history department at Columbia University (until 1935). The same year he began his tenure as chief of the New York Public Library's Music Division, a position he held until 1959. Additionally in 1931, he was one of the founders of the Music Library Association and served as their president 1937–1939.

A practical musician, one of Smith's first tasks as chief of the Music Division was to create scores for musical works which the library had only in parts. Known as the Black Line Prints project, Smith engaged the musicologist Hans T. David to hire copyists for this project under the aegis of the Federal Music Project of the Works Progress Administration.

In 1932 Smith conceived the idea of a "A Library-Museum of the Performing Arts" which would include circulating and refection collections of all the performing arts and a research center with collections of theatre, dance, film and audio-visual equipment. Once Lincoln Center was conceived in 1956, Smith's idea was finally accepted by the Library in 1957 and realized in 1965 with the opening of The Library and Museum of the Performing Arts.

In 1935, Smith inaugurated a series of Composers' Forum Concerts in which he served as chairman and moderator. A part of the Education Program of the Federal Music Project, the Composers' Forum enabled young composers to get a hearing of and discuss their work in front of an audience. The scores would then be donated to the New York Public Library. The program continued until 1939. It was restarted in 1947 with Smith as its chairman until his retirement in 1959.. At the Composers' Forum concert on October 25, 1947, Smith performed the world premiere of composer Ulysses Kay's Suite for Flute and Oboe, with Smith playing flute and Antonio Estevez playing oboe.

As an outgrowth of the Black Line Prints project, Smith establish an "Americana collection" in the Music Division in 1936 which was focused on acquiring American music. The collection was greatly enhanced with the bequest of composer/conductor Henry Kimball Hadley which not only included numerous scores from his personal library but enough funds to set up an endowment for the purpose of acquiring American music for the library. Its first curator was library staff member Joseph Muller (1877–1939). Muller was succeeded by musicologist John Tasker Howard who served as curator from 1940 though 1956. One of Howard's acquisition techniques was to directly ask publishers to donate music to the library. Smith also oversaw the acquisition of manuscript collections of Louis Moreau Gottschalk and George Frederick Bristow.

Smith was one of the founders of the American Musicological Society, providing much of the work for the inaugural meeting in New York City and served as that organization's president 1939–1940.

From 1939 to 1967 he taught music and history at New York University and in 1967 he became director of the Spanish Institute in New York.

In 1940 he embarked on a tour of Latin America and surveyed the performing arts in South America as a representative of the United States Department of State and the American Council of Learned Societies. Based on his observations of this trip he published several articles on the state of music in various Latin-American countries as well as wrote an unpublished report, "Musical Tour Through South America, June–October, 1940." In 1943 Smith was appointed chairman of performing arts activities to the Office of the Coordinator of Inter-American Affairs. That same year he embarked upon a second tour of Latin America with joint sponsorship from the Office as well as the Carnegie Corporation of New York. During this trip he lectured in Portuguese in Brazil on inter-American affairs. (He also gave a series of talks in French for the Institute Français.)

From 1944 to 1946 he was engaged as American Foreign Service Officer cultural attaché in São Paulo. During this time he lectured at the University of São Paulo, Fundação Escola de Sociologia e Política de São Paulo, and from 1944 to 1946 at the Instituto Sedes Sapientiae.

From 1947 to 1958 he was an adjunct professor for the Institute of Public Affairs and Regional Studies for New York University.

Smith retired from the New York Public Library on February 28, 1959.

== Post-retirement activity ==
Upon his retirement, Smith together with Ernesto da Cal, established the Brazilian Institute at New York University. Smith was director of the institute 1959–1961. From 1962 to 1966 he served as chairman of the Academic Committee of the institute.

In 1961 he was appointed by President John F. Kennedy to serve on the Advisory Commission of the National Cultural Center, producing a report "What Goes Into the National Culture Center?" (The National Cultural Center was later renamed the John F. Kennedy Center for the Performing Arts.) In 1962 he testified before a United States Senate subcommittee on Labor and Public Welfare regarding a bill to establish the United States Art Foundation (eventually called the National Endowment for the Arts.

Between 1963 and 1966 he served as a panel member of the U.S. Department of State's Office of Cultural Presentations.

From 1965 through 1980, Smith was a visiting professor at Douglass Residential College, annually offering a course "Music in America."

Beginning in 1984 and continuing in the 1990s, Smith was a Senior Research Associate for the Yale School of Music.

Smith died in Washington, Connecticut.
