= Espenschied =

Espenschied may refer to:

- Dragan Espenschied (born 1975), German 8-bit musician and media artist
- Lloyd Espenschied (1889–1986), American electrical engineer
- Espenschied, subdivision of Lorch, Hesse

== See also ==
- Espenschied Nunatak, mountain in Antarctica
- Thomas Espenshade, American economist
- Anna Scholl Espenschade (1903–1998), American physical educator
