= F. Elizabeth Richey =

American field hockey and squash coach

Personal information
- Born: October 20, 1912 Brookline, Massachusetts, US
- Died: May 18, 1988 (aged 75) North Sebago, Maine, US

F. Elizabeth Richey (October 20, 1912 – May 18, 1988) was an American field hockey and squash coach, and a professor of physical education. She played on the U.S. women's national field hockey team and was an All-American lacrosse player. She also founded and coached the squash program at Vassar College for more than 40 years. In 1988, she was part of the first class of inductees into the U.S. Field Hockey Association Hall of Fame.

== Early years ==
A native of Brookline, Massachusetts, she attended Brookline High School and Radcliffe College. At Radcliffe, she was the captain of the basketball team. She graduated from Radcliffe in 1934. She also received a master's degree from Columbia University.

== Career ==
After graduating from Radcliffe, she worked as a teacher for two years at Pleasantville High School.

She was hired at Vassar College in 1937 and remained there for 41 years. She was the head coach of the field hockey and squash teams. In 1937, she started the school's squash program, the first women's collegiate squash program in the country. She also founded the women's national intercollegiate individual and team squash tournaments in 1965 and 1973, respectively. She has been credited by US Squash with having "created women’s intercollegiate squash", and in her honour, the College Squash Association inaugurated the Betty Richey Award, given annually to the women's college squash player who best exemplifies Richey's approach to squash.

Richey also played on the United States national field hockey team, either reserve or first-team, for 20 years between 1931 and 1958 and participated on the U.S. touring team that played in Denmark in 1933.

Richey was also considered the greatest lacrosse player in the United States. She was selected as an All-American lacrosse player for a record 21 consecutive years. She was inducted into the lacrosse hall of fame in 1993.

== Later years ==
Richey retired in 1978 and moved to Maine. In January 1988, she became one of the charter inductees into the USA Field Hockey Hall of Fame. She died four months later in May 1988 at age 75. She died as a result of bronchial cancer. She was posthumously inducted into the College Squash Hall of Fame in 1995.
