= Closter High School =

Defunct high school in Bergen County, New Jersey, US

Coordinates: 40.975°N 73.966°W

Information
- Established: 1912
- Closed: 1955

Closter High School was a comprehensive public high school in Closter, in Bergen County, New Jersey, United States, that operated from 1912 to 1955 as part of the Closter Public Schools.

== History ==
The high school program opened in 1912 after a series of classrooms were added to accommodate the higher grades in the existing Closter School. The building became Closter Junior-Senior High School after Tenakill Grammar School opened in 1929.

The school served students from neighboring communities as part of sending/receiving relationships with their home districts, including those from Northvale, Norwood and Rockleigh. Students from Norwood were assigned by lottery to attend either Closter High School or Tenafly High School.

The school was closed in 1955 when the district became a constituent municipality in the Northern Valley Regional High School District and students began attending Northern Valley Regional High School at Demarest. The defunct high school became Village Middle School, which operated until 1996.
