= Joan Edenborn Stiles =

American field hockey player

Personal information
- Born: c. 1934

Joan Edenborn Stiles (born c. 1934), formerly Joan Edenborn, is a former American field hockey player and coach.

She graduated from Springfield High School and then attended Temple University where she competed in field hockey, basketball, and lacrosse. She was a first-team all-college players from 1952 to 1955. She also played on the United States national field hockey team from 1953 to 1961 and 1963.

She later worked as an assistant field hockey coach at Temple from 1957 to 1963 and as the head coach in 1964 and 1965.

In 1988, she became one of the charter inductees into the USA Field Hockey Hall of Fame. She was also inducted into the Temple University Athletic Hall of Fame in 1978.
