= Elenore Pepper =

American field hockey player

Personal information
- Born: November 14, 1924
- Died: December 8, 2006 (age 82)

Elenore Pepper, sometimes listed as Eleanore Pepper and Eleanor Pepper (November 14, 1924 - December 8, 2006) was an American field hockey player who played at the center forward position.

Pepper attended Beaver College (later renamed Arcadia University) in Glenside, Pennsylvania. She starred on the school's field hockey team in from 1942 to 1945, and was named to the 1945 College All-Star team. She also played on the school's basketball, tennis, softball, and riflery teams.

She played for the U.S. national field hockey team on multiple occasions between 1946 and 1963.

In 1988, she became one of the charter inductees into the USA Field Hockey Hall of Fame. She was also inducted into the Arcadia University Athletic Hall of Fame in 2013.
