= Closter, New Jersey =

Borough in Bergen County, New Jersey, US

- Borough
- Seal
- Nickname: "Hub of the Northern Valley"
- Location of Closter in Bergen County highlighted in red (left). Inset map: Location of Bergen County in New Jersey highlighted in orange (right).

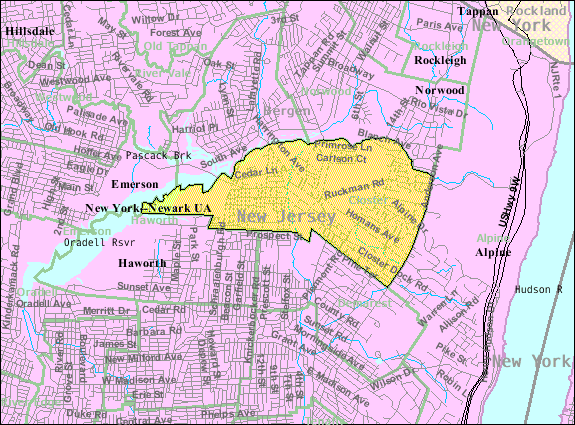
- Census Bureau map of Closter, New Jersey

- Location in Bergen County Location in New Jersey Location in the United States
- Coordinates: 40.97289°N 73.960315°W
- Country: United States
- State: New Jersey
- County: Bergen
- Incorporated: January 1, 1904

Government
  - Type: Borough
  - Body: Borough Council
  - Mayor: John C. Glidden Jr. (R, term ends December 31, 2026)
  - Administrator: James Winters
  - Municipal clerk: Mari J. Margiotta

Area
  - Total: 3.30 sq mi (8.55 km^{2})
  - Land: 3.16 sq mi (8.18 km^{2})
  - Water: 0.14 sq mi (0.37 km^{2}) 4.30%
  - Rank: 325th of 565 in state 24th of 70 in county
- Elevation: 39 ft (12 m)

Population (2020)
  - Total: 8,594
  - Estimate (2024): 8,730
  - Rank: 278th of 565 in state 47th of 70 in county
  - Density: 2,719.6/sq mi (1,050.0/km^{2})
  - Rank: 236th of 565 in state 45th of 70 in county
- Time zone: UTC−05:00 (Eastern (EST))
  - Summer (DST): UTC−04:00 (Eastern (EDT))
- ZIP Code: 07624
- Area code: 201 exchanges: 750, 767, 768, 784
- FIPS code: 3400313810
- GNIS feature ID: 0885190
- Website: www.closterboro.com

Closter (English pronunciation: /ˈkloʊstəɹ/) is a borough in Bergen County, in the U.S. state of New Jersey. As of the 2020 United States census, the borough's population was 8,594, an increase of 221 (+2.6%) from the 2010 census count of 8,373, which in turn reflected a decline of 10 (−0.1%) from the 8,383 counted in the 2000 census.

== History ==
The Lenape Native Americans tilled the soil, hunted in the woods, and fished in the rivers and streams before the Dutch arrived in the early 18th Century. The Dutch settlers, though, left an indelible mark on the area. Early records show that after the English takeover of New Netherland, English Governor Philip Carteret in 1669 granted a real estate speculator named Balthaser De Hart a strip of property which extended east and west from the Hudson River to the Tiena Kill, and north and south from today's Cresskill into Palisades, New York. It is within these geographical boundaries that lies what is now known as Closter. The first land grant deed for the area today known as Closter was not written until April 13, 1671. The northern half of this tract of land consisting of 1,030 acres (420 ha) (extending from what is Closter Dock Road northward) was purchased by Barent and Resolvert Nagel on April 25, 1710, who along with the Vervalen family first settled what is now Closter.

The name Closter is of Dutch origin and first appears in a November 18, 1721, deed between the surviving Tappan Patentees and Peter Haring (who owned land in Harrington Park/Norwood east of Tappan Road and between Harrington and Blanche Avenues)—the meets and bounds of the deed begin “Beginning at the bridge which comes out of the Clooster by the Dwars Kill..." At that time, Closter was in an area under dispute between the colonial provinces of New Jersey and New York. In the Dutch language, Klooster or "clooster" means "a quiet place, a monastery or cloister." The name was originally pronounced with an "ow" sound, phonetically, "Klowster." Later, just before the American Revolution, these isolated settlers began to feel the impact of the British Crown in their lives—not only in governmental affairs but also by the influx of English culture on their own language and practices. As a result, the "K" in Klooster was dropped and was replaced with a "C" so the now growing village became known as Clooster. By 1795, with the emerging new American culture, the second "o" in Clooster was dropped, and the American English "long o" sound was adopted which led to today's pronunciation of Closter.

The topography gave a sense of isolation and protection, tucked behind the highest point of the Palisades and protected by limited access. Alternatively, sources indicate that the name derives from an early settler named Frederick Closter who is said to have been granted the land in the area in the 1600s.

Reminders of Closter's early Dutch history abound - with local streets named after some of the early families (Bogert, Demarest, Durie, Naugle, Parsells, Vervalen, Auryansen, Haring, and Westervelt), and a rich collection of unique Jersey Dutch houses.

The arrival of the Northern Branch in 1859, followed by additional train service from what became the West Shore Railroad, brought residents to the community who could commute to Manhattan via the ferry across the Hudson River at the railroad's Weehawken depot. Closter's central location earned it the nickname "Hub of the Northern Valley".

Closter was formed as an incorporated municipality by an act of the New Jersey Legislature on January 1, 1904, from portions of Harrington Township. On March 29, 1904, Harrington Park was created from portions of Closter, Harrington Township and Washington Township.

After the turn of the 20th century, Closter changed from being sprawling estates and farms into an upper middle class suburban town.

== Geography ==
According to the United States Census Bureau, the borough had a total area of 3.30 square miles (8.55 km^{2}), including 3.16 square miles (8.18 km^{2}) of land and 0.14 square miles (0.37 km^{2}) of water (4.30%).

Closter has a humid subtropical climate similar to the rest of the Middle Atlantic region of the United States.

Closter borders the Bergen County municipalities of Alpine, Demarest, Emerson, Harrington Park, Haworth and Norwood.

As of 2026, the borough is a member of Local Leaders for Responsible Planning in order to address the borough's Mount Laurel doctrine-based housing obligations.

== Demographics ==
Historical population
Census	Pop.	Note	%±
1890	513		—
1900	1,057		106.0%
1910	1,483		40.3%
1920	1,840		24.1%
1930	2,502		36.0%
1940	2,603		4.0%
1950	3,376		29.7%
1960	7,767		130.1%
1970	8,604		10.8%
1980	8,164		−5.1%
1990	8,094		−0.9%
2000	8,383		3.6%
2010	8,373		−0.1%
2020	8,594		2.6%
2024 (est.)	8,730	▲	1.6%
Population sources: 1910–1920 1910; 1910–1930 1900–2020; 2000 2010 2020

=== Racial and ethnic composition ===
Closter borough, Bergen County, New Jersey – Racial and ethnic composition Note: the US Census treats Hispanic/Latino as an ethnic category. This table excludes Latinos from the racial categories and assigns them to a separate category. Hispanics/Latinos may be of any race.
Race / Ethnicity (NH = Non-Hispanic)	Pop 2000	Pop 2010	Pop 2020	% 2000	% 2010	% 2020
White alone (NH)	6,059	5,019	4,496	72.28%	59.94%	52.32%
Black or African American alone (NH)	76	100	83	0.91%	1.19%	0.97%
Native American or Alaska Native alone (NH)	8	1	2	0.10%	0.01%	0.02%
Asian alone (NH)	1,800	2,649	3,009	21.47%	31.64%	35.01%
Native Hawaiian or Pacific Islander alone (NH)	0	1	0	0.00%	0.01%	0.00%
Other race alone (NH)	10	10	30	0.12%	0.12%	0.35%
Mixed race or Multiracial (NH)	87	92	249	1.04%	1.10%	2.90%
Hispanic or Latino (any race)	343	501	725	4.09%	5.98%	8.44%
Total	8,383	8,373	8,594	100.00%	100.00%	100.00%

=== 2020 census ===
As of the 2020 census, Closter had a population of 8,594. The median age was 43.8 years. Of residents, 24.9% were under the age of 18 and 16.0% were 65 years of age or older. For every 100 females, there were 98.3 males, and for every 100 females age 18 and over, there were 97.0 males age 18 and over.

In Closter, 100.0% of residents lived in urban areas, while 0.0% lived in rural areas.

There were 2,762 households in Closter, of which 42.8% had children under the age of 18 living in them. Of all households, 70.9% were married-couple households, 11.0% were households with a male householder and no spouse or partner present, and 16.2% were households with a female householder and no spouse or partner present. About 13.4% of all households were made up of individuals and 7.9% had someone living alone who was 65 years of age or older.

There were 2,891 housing units, of which 4.5% were vacant. The homeowner vacancy rate was 1.2% and the rental vacancy rate was 7.8%.

=== 2010 census ===
The 2010 United States census counted 8,373 people, 2,747 households, and 2,327 families in the borough. The population density was 2,646.0 per square mile (1,021.6/km^{2}). There were 2,860 housing units at an average density of 903.8 per square mile (349.0/km^{2}). The racial makeup was 64.17% (5,373) White, 1.31% (110) Black or African American, 0.05% (4) Native American, 31.65% (2,650) Asian, 0.01% (1) Pacific Islander, 1.54% (129) from other races, and 1.27% (106) from two or more races. Hispanic or Latino of any race were 5.98% (501) of the population.

Of the 2,747 households, 43.4% had children under the age of 18; 73.2% were married couples living together; 8.4% had a female householder with no husband present and 15.3% were non-families. Of all households, 12.9% were made up of individuals and 7.3% had someone living alone who was 65 years of age or older. The average household size was 3.02 and the average family size was 3.30.

26.7% of the population were under the age of 18, 6.3% from 18 to 24, 20.5% from 25 to 44, 33.0% from 45 to 64, and 13.5% who were 65 years of age or older. The median age was 43.2 years. For every 100 females, the population had 96.1 males. For every 100 females ages 18 and older there were 91.4 males.

Korean Americans accounted for 21.2% of the population.

Same-sex couples headed 15 households in 2010, an increase from the 10 counted in 2000.

The Census Bureau's 2006–2010 American Community Survey showed that (in 2010 inflation-adjusted dollars) median household income was $117,147 (with a margin of error of +/− $14,096) and the median family income was $128,656 (+/− $13,704). Males had a median income of $93,578 (+/− $13,709) versus $64,167 (+/− $13,864) for females. The per capita income for the borough was $50,501 (+/− $4,636). About 3.2% of families and 3.0% of the population were below the poverty line, including 1.2% of those under age 18 and 3.4% of those age 65 or over.

=== 2000 census ===
As of the 2000 United States census there were 8,383 people, 2,789 households, and 2,320 families residing in the borough. The population density was 2,644.3 inhabitants per square mile (1,021.0/km^{2}). There were 2,865 housing units at an average density of 903.7 per square mile (348.9/km^{2}). The racial makeup of the borough was 75.32% White, 21.56% Asian, 0.93% African American, 0.10% Native American, 0.81% from other races, and 1.29% from two or more races. Hispanic or Latino of any race were 4.09% of the population.

As of the 2000 Census, 12.75% of Closter's residents identified themselves as being of Korean ancestry, which was the seventh highest in the United States and fifth highest of any municipality in New Jersey, for all places with 1,000 or more residents identifying their ancestry. As of the 2010 Census, 21.2% residents (1,771 people) indicated that they were of Korean ancestry.

There were 2,789 households, out of which 43.3% had children under the age of 18 living with them, 72.9% were married couples living together, 8.0% had a female householder with no husband present, and 16.8% were non-families. 14.0% of all households were made up of individuals, and 7.0% had someone living alone who was 65 years of age or older. The average household size was 2.98 and the average family size was 3.30.

In the borough the population was spread out, with 28.0% under the age of 18, 4.8% from 18 to 24, 28.1% from 25 to 44, 26.0% from 45 to 64, and 13.1% who were 65 years of age or older. The median age was 40 years. For every 100 females, there were 97.1 males. For every 100 females age 18 and over, there were 91.0 males.

The median income for a household in the borough was $83,918, and the median income for a family was $94,543. Males had a median income of $65,848 versus $39,125 for females. The per capita income for the borough was $37,065. About 1.7% of families and 2.7% of the population were below the poverty line, including 3.0% of those under age 18 and 1.8% of those age 65 or over.

== Economy ==
Closter has an outdoor mall called Closter Plaza that includes stores, restaurants and a movie theater. First constructed in the 1960s, a long-term construction project began in July 2015 that added a Whole Foods, Target, HomeGoods, and other new businesses to the 208,000-square-foot (19,300 m^{2}) mall, which occupies a 16-acre (6.5 ha) site. In August 2012, the mall was used for filming scenes for the film The Wolf of Wall Street. The renovation project, which had been in the works for more than a decade, was completed in late 2016.

== Sports and recreation ==
The Closter Golf Center includes 120 stalls in a two-story driving range, as well as a mini golf course.

Parks in the borough include:

- Amendola Park – located on Willow Road, features a playground
- High Street Park – located at the intersection of High Street and Piermont Road that has a playground and fitness area.
- Memorial Field – also known as Veterans Memorial Field. Located on Harrington Avenue, it has a playground, athletic fields, and a bandshell. It also has a memorial of all US Veterans as well as a memorial of those who died in the September 11 terrorist attacks.
- Mollicone Park – a baseball field located at the intersection of Knickerbocker Road and Eckerson Avenue. This park was honored after Closter-native Vietnam War veteran, Donald Mollicone.
- Ruckman Park – located at the intersection of Piermont and Ruckman roads, that have athletic fields, walking/jogging path, and a playground
- Schauble Park – located on Bergenline Avenue, this park has a playground, bike path, and athletic fields.

== Government ==
=== Local government ===
Closter is governed under the borough form of New Jersey municipal government, which is used in 218 municipalities (of the 564) statewide, making it the most common form of government in New Jersey. The governing body is comprised of a mayor and a borough council, with all positions elected at-large on a partisan basis as part of the November general election. A mayor is elected directly by the voters to a four-year term of office. The borough council includes six members elected to serve three-year terms on a staggered basis, with two seats coming up for election each year in a three-year cycle. The borough form of government used by Closter is a "weak mayor / strong council" government in which council members act as the legislative body with the mayor presiding at meetings and voting only in the event of a tie. The mayor can veto ordinances subject to an override by a two-thirds majority vote of the council. The mayor makes committee and liaison assignments for council members, and most appointments are made by the mayor with the advice and consent of the council.

As of 2025, the mayor of Closter Borough is Republican John C. Glidden Jr., whose term of office ends December 31, 2026. Members of the Closter Borough Council are Council President Alissa J. Latner (D, 2024), Victoria Roti Amitai (R, 2025), Christopher Cho (R, 2026), Jannie Chung (D, 2024), Anna Maroules (R, 2026) and Joseph Yammarino (R, 2025).

In January 2015, the borough council selected former councilmember Tom Hennessey from a list of three candidates nominated by the Republican municipal committee to fill the vacant seat that had been held by John C. Glidden Jr., expiring in 2016 that became vacant when Glidden took office as mayor.

In 2017, former borough council president Robert Di Dio was appointed to the New Jersey State Board of Pharmacy by Governor Chris Christie.

==== Emergency services ====
Closter has its own fire department. Originally the Knickerbocker Hook and Ladder Company, it was formed in 1893 and has responded to emergencies around the clock since then. The department responds to an average of 269 calls a year. It is staffed by volunteers, and it has a combined fleet of two Engines, one Ladder, one Rescue, and one utility truck.

The Closter Volunteer Ambulance and Rescue Corps was formed in 1936, and serves three jurisdictions: Closter, the neighboring borough of Alpine, and the section of the Palisades Interstate Parkway within Alpine's borders.

Closter also has its own police department. Led by Chief James Buccola, the department includes a captain, three lieutenants, five sergeants, and eleven patrol officers. Two of these officers (both sergeants) make up the department's detective bureau. The department has one Administrative Assistant, a non-officer role.

=== Federal, state and county representation ===
Closter is located in the 5th Congressional District and is part of New Jersey's 39th state legislative district.

For the 119th United States Congress, New Jersey's 5th congressional district is represented by Josh Gottheimer (D, Wyckoff). New Jersey is represented in the United States Senate by Democrats Cory Booker (Newark, term ends 2027) and Andy Kim (Moorestown, term ends 2031).

For the 2026–2027 session, the 39th legislative district of the New Jersey Legislature is represented in the State Senate by Holly Schepisi (R, River Vale) and in the General Assembly by Robert Auth (R, Old Tappan) and John V. Azzariti (R, Saddle River).

Bergen County is governed by a directly elected County Executive, with legislative functions performed by a Board of County Commissioners comprised of seven members who are elected at-large to three-year terms in partisan elections on a staggered basis, with either two or three seats coming up for election each November; a Chairman and Vice Chairman are selected from among its seven members at a reorganization meeting held every January. As of 2025, the county executive is James J. Tedesco III (D, Paramus), whose four-year term of office ends December 31, 2026.

Bergen County's Commissioners are Chair Mary J. Amoroso (D, Mahwah, 2025), Vice Chair Steven A. Tanelli (D, North Arlington, 2027), Chair Pro Tem Joan Voss (D, Fort Lee, 2026), Rafael Marte (D, Bergenfield, 2026), Germaine M. Ortiz (D, Emerson, 2025), Thomas J. Sullivan Jr. (D, Montvale, 2025) and Tracy Silna Zur (D, Franklin Lakes, 2027).

Bergen County's elected constitutional officials are Clerk John S. Hogan (D, Northvale, 2026), Sheriff Anthony Cureton (D, Englewood, 2027) and Surrogate Michael R. Dressler (D, Cresskill, 2026).

=== Politics ===
Presidential election results

United States presidential election results for Closter
Year	Republican		Democratic		Third party(ies)	
Year	No.	%	No.	%	No.	%
2024	1,710	42.56%	2,247	55.92%	61	1.52%
2020	1,717	36.44%	2,953	62.67%	42	0.89%
2016	1,478	37.72%	2,309	58.93%	131	3.34%
2012	1,639	46.44%	1,857	52.62%	33	0.94%
2008	1,715	43.56%	2,184	55.47%	38	0.97%
2004	1,860	46.65%	2,100	52.67%	27	0.68%
2000	1,595	42.39%	2,036	54.11%	132	3.51%
1996	1,526	42.10%	1,783	49.19%	316	8.72%
1992	1,847	45.90%	1,611	40.03%	566	14.07%
1988	2,361	60.05%	1,555	39.55%	16	0.41%
1984	2,871	66.06%	1,463	33.66%	12	0.28%
1980	2,392	57.89%	1,222	29.57%	518	12.54%
1976	2,505	59.36%	1,639	38.84%	76	1.80%
1972	2,972	68.89%	1,277	29.60%	65	1.51%
1968	2,466	58.98%	1,506	36.02%	209	5.00%
1964	1,815	45.76%	2,150	54.21%	1	0.03%
1960	2,626	68.80%	1,190	31.18%	1	0.03%

As of March 2011, there were a total of 4,930 registered voters in Closter, of which 1,348 (27.3% vs. 31.7% countywide) were registered as Democrats, 1,060 (21.5% vs. 21.1%) were registered as Republicans and 2,519 (51.1% vs. 47.1%) were registered as Unaffiliated. There were 3 voters registered as Libertarians or Greens. Among the borough's 2010 Census population, 58.9% (vs. 57.1% in Bergen County) were registered to vote, including 80.4% of those ages 18 and over (vs. 73.7% countywide).

In the 2016 presidential election, Democrat Hillary Clinton received 2,309 votes (58.4% vs. 54.2% countywide), ahead of Republican Donald Trump with 1,478 votes (37.4% vs 41.1% countywide) and other candidates with 96 votes (2.4% vs 3.0% countywide), among the 3,952 ballots cast by the borough's 5,557 registered voters, for a turnout of 71.1% (vs. 73% in Bergen County). In the 2012 presidential election, Democrat Barack Obama received 1,857 votes (52.3% vs. 54.8% countywide), ahead of Republican Mitt Romney with 1,639 votes (46.2% vs. 43.5%) and other candidates with 30 votes (0.8% vs. 0.9%), among the 3,550 ballots cast by the borough's 5,136 registered voters, for a turnout of 69.1% (vs. 70.4% in Bergen County). In the 2008 presidential election, Democrat Barack Obama received 2,184 votes (55.2% vs. 53.9% countywide), ahead of Republican John McCain with 1,715 votes (43.4% vs. 44.5%) and other candidates with 28 votes (0.7% vs. 0.8%), among the 3,955 ballots cast by the borough's 5,187 registered voters, for a turnout of 76.2% (vs. 76.8% in Bergen County).

Gubernatorial election results for Closter
Year	Republican		Democratic		Third party(ies)	
Year	No.	%	No.	%	No.	%
2025	1,327	43.35%	1,722	56.26%	12	0.39%
2021	1,099	42.86%	1,451	56.59%	14	0.55%
2017	794	41.14%	1,121	58.08%	15	0.78%
2013	1,183	64.15%	646	35.03%	15	0.81%
2009	1,156	46.00%	1,238	49.26%	119	4.74%
2005	1,075	42.14%	1,435	56.25%	41	1.61%

In the 2013 gubernatorial election, Republican Chris Christie received 64.2% of the vote (1,183 cast), ahead of Democrat Barbara Buono with 35.0% (646 votes), and other candidates with 0.8% (15 votes), among the 1,883 ballots cast by the borough's 4,945 registered voters (39 ballots were spoiled), for a turnout of 38.1%. In the 2009 gubernatorial election, Democrat Jon Corzine received 1,238 ballots cast (48.7% vs. 48.0% countywide), ahead of Republican Chris Christie with 1,156 votes (45.5% vs. 45.8%), Independent Chris Daggett with 112 votes (4.4% vs. 4.7%) and other candidates with 7 votes (0.3% vs. 0.5%), among the 2,543 ballots cast by the borough's 5,064 registered voters, yielding a 50.2% turnout (vs. 50.0% in the county).

United States Senate election results for Closter1
Year	Republican		Democratic		Third party(ies)	
Year	No.	%	No.	%	No.	%
2024	1,617	40.67%	2,298	57.80%	61	1.53%
2018	1,139	41.61%	1,540	56.27%	58	2.12%
2012	1,400	43.26%	1,782	55.07%	54	1.67%
2006	1,237	46.42%	1,400	52.53%	28	1.05%

United States Senate election results for Closter2
Year	Republican		Democratic		Third party(ies)	
Year	No.	%	No.	%	No.	%
2020	1,705	36.86%	2,893	62.54%	28	0.61%
2014	842	39.70%	1,247	58.79%	32	1.51%
2013	542	39.82%	818	60.10%	1	0.07%
2008	1,487	41.70%	2,052	57.54%	27	0.76%

== Education ==
The Closter Public Schools serve students in pre-kindergarten through eighth grade. As of the 2021–22 school year, the district, comprised of two schools, had an enrollment of 1,190 students and 93.0 classroom teachers (on an FTE basis), for a student–teacher ratio of 12.8:1. Schools in the district (with 2021–22 enrollment data from the National Center for Education Statistics) are Hillside Elementary School with 621 students in grades PreK-4 and Tenakill Middle School with 556 students in grades 5–8. Hillside Elementary School was awarded the Blue Ribbon School Award of Excellence in 2021 school year.

Students in ninth through twelfth grades attend Northern Valley Regional High School at Demarest in Demarest, together with students from Demarest and Haworth. The high school is part of the Northern Valley Regional High School District, which also serves students from Harrington Park, Northvale, Norwood and Old Tappan. During the 1994–1996 school years, Northern Valley Regional High School at Demarest was awarded the Blue Ribbon School Award of Excellence by the United States Department of Education. As of the 2021–22 school year, the high school had an enrollment of 974 students and 91.3 classroom teachers (on an FTE basis), for a student–teacher ratio of 10.7:1. Local students had attended Closter High School until Northern Valley Regional High School at Demarest opened in 1955, whereupon the Closter school was closed.

Public school students from the borough, and all of Bergen County, are eligible to attend the secondary education programs offered by the Bergen County Technical Schools, which include the Bergen County Academies in Hackensack, and the Bergen Tech campus in Teterboro or Paramus. The district offers programs on a shared-time or full-time basis, with admission based on a selective application process and tuition covered by the student's home school district.

== Houses of worship ==
The Church of Saint Mary is a faith community in the Roman Catholic tradition. The parish offers daily and weekend masses. The parish conducts religious education for youth and adult enrichment programs. The Church of Saint Mary features 33 notable stained glass windows, sketched by Sister M. Conegunda of the Felician Sisters and crafted by the Closter Art Studios.

Temple Emanu-El is a Conservative synagogue that offers weekly services in addition to a Hebrew school for children beginning at age 3.

St. Paul's Evangelical Lutheran Church is a Confessional Lutheran parish belonging to the Lutheran Church - Missouri Synod. St. Paul's finished construction and was consecrated to a parish in 1888, dedicated to St. Paul, and served the local German Lutheran population in the area. Renovations made during the 1960's gave the parish an additional library, a banquet hall, storage rooms, and classrooms for the Sunday school. The parish offers weekly Sunday services, and also services on special days of observance. The parish also participates in community outreach, donating quilts made by the parish's Ladies Aid to the Lutheran World Relief, and participating in the annual Closter Memorial Day Parade.

== Transportation ==
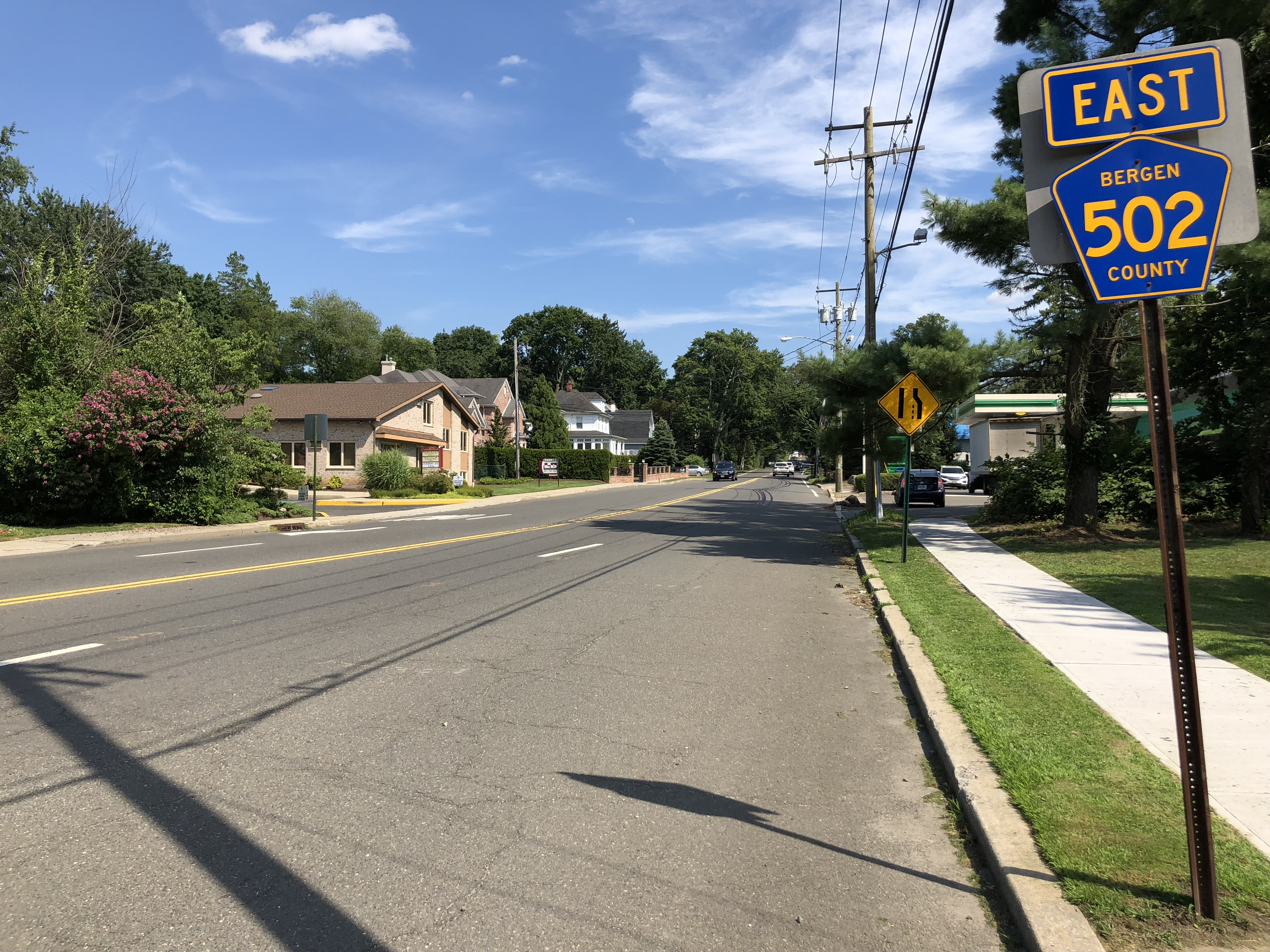
County Route 502 in Closter

=== Roads and highways ===
As of May 2010, the borough had a total of 43.34 miles (69.75 km) of roadways, of which 33.48 miles (53.88 km) were maintained by the municipality and 9.86 miles (15.87 km) by Bergen County.

County Route 501, County Route 502 and County Route 505 travel through Closter.

Closter can also be reached via the Palisades Interstate Parkway and U.S. Route 9W, which pass through adjacent municipalities.

=== Public transportation ===
The NJ Transit 167 and 177 bus routes provide service along Schraalenburgh Road to the Port Authority Bus Terminal in Midtown Manhattan.

Coach USA's Rockland Coaches provides service from Closter to the Port Authority Bus Terminal via the 20 bus route.

== Notable people ==
People who were born in, residents of, or otherwise closely associated with Closter include:

- Coe Finch Austin (1831–1880), botanist and founding member of the Torrey Botanical Club
- Abram Belskie (1907–1988), British-born sculptor
- Benjamin Blackledge (1743–1815), first English teacher in Closter and "the most prominent man in the northern part of Bergen County"
- George Dayton (1827–1938), represented Bergen County in the New Jersey Senate from 1875 to 1877
- Emme (born 1963), plus-size model
- Bill Evans (1929–1980), jazz pianist and composer who mostly worked in a trio setting
- Brian Gorman (born 1959), umpire in Major League Baseball
- Tom Gorman (1919–1986), Major League Baseball umpire
- Bruce Harper (born 1955), former NFL running back and kick returner who played for the New York Jets
- Israel Horowitz (1916–2008), record producer who became an editor and columnist on classical music at Billboard magazine
- Richard Hunt (1951–1992), puppeteer best known for his association with The Muppets
- Helen Jepson (1904–1997), lyric soprano who was lead soprano at the Metropolitan Opera from 1935 to 1941
- Marcel Jovine (1921–2003), sculptor and creator of The Visible Man, The Visible Woman and The Closter Seal
- David-Seth Kirshner (born 1973), rabbi and activist, who has served as spiritual leader of Temple Emanu-El
- Philip Kwon, deputy counsel for the Port Authority of New York and New Jersey
- Tommy La Stella (born 1989), second baseman for the Atlanta Braves and Chicago Cubs
- London Lee (1935–2015), comedian billed as "The Rich Kid"
- Robert Lipsyte (born 1938), sports journalist and author
- Sam Lipsyte (born 1968), author
- Rich Luzzi (born 1978), frontman for Rev Theory
- Regan Mizrahi (born 2000), actor and the voice of Boots the Monkey on Dora the Explorer
- Joseph Muller (1883–1939), collector, sailor and employee of the New York Public Library
- J. Massey Rhind (1860–1936), sculptor
- Mike Stanton (born 1967), former MLB relief pitcher who played for the New York Yankees
- Tom Waddell (born 1958), former Major League Baseball pitcher
- Gary Yost (born 1959), filmmaker, musician and software designer, best known for leading the team that created Autodesk 3ds Max

== Sources ==
- Municipal Incorporations of the State of New Jersey (according to Counties) prepared by the Division of Local Government, Department of the Treasury (New Jersey); December 1, 1958.
- Clayton, W. Woodford; and Nelson, William. History of Bergen and Passaic Counties, New Jersey, with Biographical Sketches of Many of its Pioneers and Prominent Men., Philadelphia: Everts and Peck, 1882.
- Garbe-Morillo, Patricia. Closter and Alpine, Arcadia Publishing Images of America series, 2001. ISBN 9780738508580.
- Harvey, Cornelius Burnham (ed.), Genealogical History of Hudson and Bergen Counties, New Jersey. New York: New Jersey Genealogical Publishing Co., 1900.
- Van Valen, James M. History of Bergen County, New Jersey. New York: New Jersey Publishing and Engraving Co., 1900.
- Westervelt, Frances A. (Frances Augusta), 1858–1942, History of Bergen County, New Jersey, 1630–1923, Lewis Historical Publishing Company, 1923.

== See also ==
- List of U.S. cities with significant Korean-American populations
