= Betty Shellenberger =

American field hockey player

Personal information
- Born: August 8, 1921 Germantown, Pennsylvania, U.S.
- Died: December 30, 2019 (aged 98) Flourtown, Pennsylvania, U.S.

Betty Shellenberger (August 8, 1921 – December 30, 2019), sometimes known as "Shelly Shellenberger", was an American field hockey and lacrosse player, coach, and official. She played on the U.S. women's national field hockey team from 1939 to 1941, 1946 to 1955, and in 1960. She was also a member of the USA national lacrosse team from 1940 to 1961. She was in the first class of inductees into the U.S. Field Hockey Association Hall of Fame.

== Early years ==
Shellenberger was born in 1921 and began playing field hockey at age nine. Constance Applebee was one of her coaches. Shellenberger attended The Agnes Irwin School.

== Field hockey and military career ==
She was a member of the U.S. national field hockey team from 1939 to 1941, 1946 to 1955, and in 1960. She was also a member of the USA national lacrosse team from 1940 to 1961. She served in the United States Marine Corps Women's Reserve during World War II and was stationed at Marine Corps Air Station El Toro in California where she was an aviation mechanic.

Shellenberger was also a coach at Chestnut Hill College, serving as head coach of the field hockey program from 1964 to 1977, the lacrosse program from 1965 to 1977, and the badminton program from 1950 to 1956, 1960 to 1961, and 1964 to 1977.

After her playing career, she served as an umpire in both national and international games. The USA Field Hockey Association established the Shellenberger Umpiring Award in her honor. She was also an administrator with USA Field Hockey, serving as first executive secretary from 1955 to 1978.

== Honors and later years ==
In 1988, she was one of the charter inductees into the USA Field Hockey Hall of Fame. She was also inducted into the Pennsylvania Sports Hall of Fame in 1986, the National Lacrosse Hall of Fame in 1994, and the Philadelphia Sports Hall of Fame in 2009 for lacrosse. In 1987, she was named a Distinguished Daughter of Pennsylvania.

She died in 2019 at age 98.
