= Alison Hersey Risch =

American field hockey and lacrosse player/coach (born 1936)

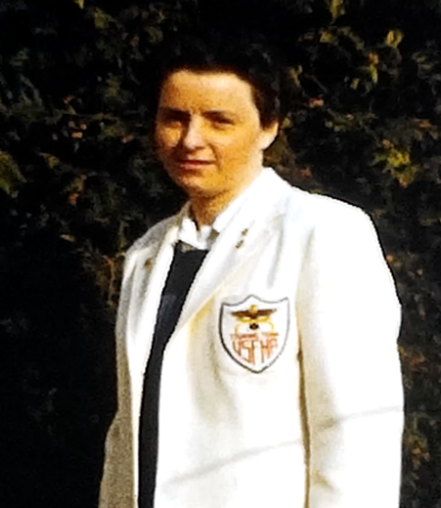
- Risch in her US Field Hockey touring team jacket

Personal information
- Born: October 23, 1936 (age 89) Winchester, Massachusetts, U.S.

Alison Hersey Risch (born October 23, 1936), formerly Alison Hersey, is a former American field hockey, lacrosse player, and official.

== Career ==
Starting her competitive athletic career as a three-sport athlete (field hockey, basketball, and softball) at Winchester High School in Winchester, Massachusetts, she credited coach Millie Barnes with sparking her love of sports. Risch attended Mount Holyoke College from 1955 to 1959.

She played with the US Field Hockey touring team from 1956 to 1969. She also played on the U.S. Women's National Lacrosse Team from 1961 to 1970, and served as team captain from 1964 to 1970.

After graduating from Mount Holyoke, Risch earned a master's degree from Tufts University.

She later served as a field hockey coach at Kennett High School in Conway, New Hampshire. She also served as a match coordinator and internationally rated umpire for more than 40 years.

Risch was also a competitive alpine ski racer. In 1964, she was certified by the Professional Ski Instructor's Association, and she has been a ski instructor and director since 1963.

In January 1988, Risch became one of the charter inductees into the USA Field Hockey Hall of Fame. In 1999, she was inducted into the New England Chapter of the National Lacrosse Hall of Fame, and in 2003 she was inducted into the National Lacrosse Hall of Fame. Mount Holyoke inducted her into their athletics Hall of Fame (inaugural 2013 class), as did Winchester High School into their Hall of Fame (1995).
