= Lebanon Daily News =

Newspaper

- Type: Daily newspaper
- Owner: USA Today Co.
- Headquarters: 718 Poplar Street; Lebanon, Pennsylvania
- Website: ldnews.com

Lebanon Daily News is a local daily newspaper based in Lebanon, Pennsylvania, United States. The main office is located on 718 Poplar Street. It publishes as an afternoon paper Monday through Friday and as a morning paper on Saturday and Sunday.

== Prices and circulation ==
The current newsstand price for the daily and Saturday papers is 75¢ while the Sunday paper is $1.50. Subscribing for eight weeks costs $14.80, while 12 weeks costs $22.21, 24 weeks costs $44.42, and 50 weeks costs $88.84. The paper was one of five in Pennsylvania owned by MediaNews Group, the second largest media company in the U.S., concerned primarily with newspapers. According to MediaNews Group, Lebanon, PA circulated up to 50,000 papers. In 2015, Gannett acquired full ownership of a Pennsylvania joint venture with MediaNews successor Digital First Media.

== Content ==
The content of Lebanon Daily News is essentially split up into seven different subjects: news, opinion, sports, business, lifestyles, obituaries, and entertainment. Often the stories are about notable people within the community of Lebanon. In the twentieth century, the LDN contained a dialect column in Pennsylvania German, notably by the newspaper's religion editor, the Rev. Dr. Pierce E. Swope, "Der Kaspar Hufnagel."

== Newspaper staff ==
Interim President: George Troyano
News Director: Randy Parker
Sports Editor: Pat Huggins
Circulation Operations Manager: Joe Clark

== Website ==
The paper is available for viewing online. The website lists all the current content on its homepage, and all past stories are available for viewing in its archives. A calendar of events in Lebanon is available, as well as real estate, auto listings, classifieds, and jobs. There is an RSS feed available, and one can register their mobile phone on the site to get updates about the Lebanon Daily News. Subscribers can also opt to make “E-Edition” available, which makes Lebanon Daily News viewable on the computer exactly as it appears in print.

The Lebanon Daily News website went behind a paywall in August 2011, charging print subscribers and non-subscribers varying rates for access beyond a free five articles per month.

== Lebanon Daily News in the media ==
The paper is not very well known because the county of Lebanon is so small and off the radar; however, Lebanon Daily News has indeed been mentioned in a few instances outside of Lebanon.

=== Iron Editor: How to Save Newspapers from Advocacy Journalism ===
Michael A. Raffaele, former editor of the Lebanon Daily News, wrote a book called Iron Editor: How to Save Newspapers from Advocacy Journalism. The book is essentially about Raffaele's experiences working for multiple papers, including the Lebanon Daily News, so it gives an insider's viewpoint on the paper.

=== Tip of the Spear: A Unique Perspective on Pennsylvania's Political Revolution ===
Russ Diamond’s Tip of the Spear: A Unique Perspective on Pennsylvania’s Political Revolution lists the Lebanon Daily News as a reference multiple times throughout the book. Lebanon Daily News published numerous comments on Diamond's status as a politician.
