= Steve Danielson =

American field hockey player (born 1972)

Personal information
- Born: March 15, 1972 (age 54) Honolulu, Hawaii
- Occupation: Assistant coach
Medal record
Representing United States
Men's field hockey
Pan American Games
| Bronze medal – third place | Mar del Plata 1995 | Team competition |

Steven Patrick Danielson (born March 15, 1972) in 2019 he completed his tenth season as an assistant coach for the Stanford University's field hockey team. In 2018 he and head coach Tara Danielson and assistant coach Patrick Cota were named the America East Coaching Staff of the Year. Formerly a field hockey midfielder, he has competed for the United States since 1989 in indoor and outdoor field hockey. He and the national squad finished twelfth at the 1996 Summer Olympics in Atlanta, Georgia. In 2018 he was inducted into the USA Field Hockey Hall of Fame. He lives with his family in Rye, New Hampshire.
