= Ross Frederick George =

Ross Frederick George (11 March 1889 – 19 February 1959) was an American sign painter, inventor, and type designer who resided in Seattle, Washington. He learned to letter from William Hugh Gordon.

George was born in Parker, South Dakota, to Francis Pierce George and Alice Carroll.

George and Gordon were asked to design pens for Hunt Pen Company in 1913. By 1915 the pens were patented, and then put into production. The pens included A-style, B-style, C-style, D-style, and E-style nibs that reportedly cut the labor time of the lettering artist in half. George then proceeded to produce a periodical Speedball Text Book which was a way for him to provide insight to those who wished to learn the art of lettering and sign painting. He created numerous editions until his death in 1959. His last was the 17th edition, although he had some involvement with the 18th edition.

Ross F. George was a member of the PNW Mountaineering Club for many years, where he enjoyed camping, hiking, and associating with like minded people who were avid about exploring the country.

In 1929, Ross F. George received a patent for a noiseless switch.

He died in 1959 in Seattle.
