= Anna Scholl Espenschade =

American physical educator

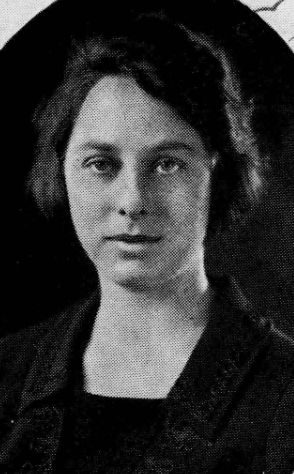
- Anna S. Espenschade, from the 1925 yearbook of Goucher College
- Born: March 4, 1903; Mifflintown, Pennsylvania, U.S.
- Died: November 27, 1998 (aged 95); Laguna Hills, California, U.S.
- Occupation(s): Physical educator, college professor

Anna Scholl Espenschade (March 4, 1903 – November 27, 1998) was an American physical educator and college professor. She taught physical education at the University of California, Berkeley from 1928 to 1968. She was president of the American Academy of Physical Education from 1955 to 1956. In 1957, she was inducted as an honorary member into the USA Field Hockey Hall of Fame.

== Early life and education ==
Espenschade was born in Mifflintown, Pennsylvania, and raised in Pittsburgh, the daughter of Carl F. Espenschade and Marion Vida Scholl Espenschade. She graduated from Goucher College in 1924, and earned a master's degree at Wellesley College in 1926, with a thesis titled "A Study of the Factors of Physical Endurance". She completed doctoral studies in psychology at Berkeley in 1939. As a young woman, she was a member of the national reserve team of the United States Field Hockey Association, president of the athletic association at Goucher College, and a competitive swimmer.

== Career ==
During college, Espenschade was a counselor and taught tennis and swimming at summer camps in Maine and Pennsylvania. She taught at Syracuse University from 1926 to 1928, and at the University of California, Berkeley for forty years, beginning in 1928. She was associated with the school's Institute of Child Development, and had administrative roles, including acting assistant dean of women, assistant department chair from 1959 to 1968, and faculty advisor to the Women's Athletic Association. She coached women's field hockey. She retired from academic work in 1968.

Espenschade was vice-president of the United States Field Hockey Association from 1937 to 1940, president of the American Academy of Physical Education from 1955 to 1956, and president of the Western Society for Physical Education of College Women from 1955 to 1957. In 1957, she was inducted as an honorary member into the USA Field Hockey Hall of Fame.

In 1958 Espenschade was technical director of an instructional film, "Evaluating Physical Abilities." In 1964, she was the Amy Morris Homans Fellow at Wellesley College, to work on a study about adult physical fitness. She received awards from the American Association for Health, Physical Education, and Recreation, and from the American Academy of Physical Education. She served on the first advisory board of the President's Council on Physical Fitness. She was the first woman member of the editorial board of the journal Medicine and Science in Sports. "Being physically fit, most people can do things better," she explained in 1965, of her interest in lifelong fitness.

== Publications ==
Espenschade published her research in academic journals including Research Quarterly of the American Physical Education Association, Monographs of the Society for Research in Child Development, The Journal of Health and Physical Education, Child Development, Review of Educational Research, Perceptual and Motor Skills, and The Journal of Gerontology.

- "Hockey in South Wales" (1927)
- "An Analysis of Activity Records of Field Hockey Players" (1936)
- "Motor Performance in Adolescence Including the Study of Relationships with Measures of Physical Growth and Maturity" (1940)
- "The Nature of Directed Teaching" (1941)
- "Report of the Test Committee of the Western Society of Departments of Physical Education for Women in Colleges and Universities" (1943)
- "Physiological Maturity As a Factor in the Qualification of Boys for Physical Activity" (1944)
- "Speedball: An Adaptable Game" (1944, with Anna Schieffer)
- "Practice Effects in the Stunt Type Test" (1945)
- "A Note on the Comparative Motor Ability of Negro and White Tenth Grade Girls" (1946)
- "Development of Motor Coordination in Boys and Girls" (1947)
- "Motor Development and Decline" (1950, with Nancy Bayley)
- "Kinesthetic Awareness in Motor Learning" (1958)
- "Restudy of Relationships Between Physical Performances of School Children and Age, Height, and Weight" (1963)
- Motor Development (1966, with Helen Eckert)
- ""The Role of Exercise in the Well-Being of Women, 35-80" (1969)

== Personal life ==
Espenschade had an active retirement, traveling and competing internationally in senior sports including lawn bowling and swimming. She died in 1998, at the age of 95, in Laguna Hills, California, after falling ill during a cruise on the coast of Africa. The Bancroft Library has a collection of her papers. Berkeley presents an annual Anna Espenschade Award to an outstanding woman student-athlete in the graduating class.
