= Adele Boyd =

American field hockey player (1932–2018)

Personal information
- Full name: Adele Pack Boyd
- Born: 1932 Glenside, Pennsylvania, US
- Died: January 27, 2018 (aged 85–86)

Adele Pack Boyd (1932 – January 27, 2018) was an American field hockey player, coach, and official. She played on the U.S. women's national field hockey team from 1959 to 1967 and was a charter member of the USA Field Hockey Hall of Fame. She later served as a professor at Ursinus College and was the school's field hockey coach for 17 years.

== Early years ==
She was a native of Glenside, Pennsylvania, and attended Cheltenham High School in suburban Philadelphia, graduating in 1949. She attended Ursinus College from 1949 to 1953. She later received a master's degree in education from Temple University.

== Career ==
Boyd was hired as a teacher and coach at Cheltenham High School in 1954. She taught English and physical education and coached the field hockey, basketball, and lacrosse teams.

She was a member of the U.S. women's national field hockey team starting in either 1959 or 1961 and continuing until 1966 or 1967. She was the national team captain from 1963 to 1967. She also played for U.S. touring teams that played in England in 1962, Jamaica in 1965, and Germany in 1967. She was also a member of the Philadelphia Association team from 1953 to 1967.

In 1967, as her playing career ended, she was hired as a professor at Ursinus. She took over as the school's head field hockey coach in 1972 and served in that post for 17 years. She led her teams to two NCAA title games and ten finishes among the Top 20.

Boyd authored numerous sports articles for magazines, and co-wrote a chapter of Mildred Barnes's book, Field Hockey: The Coach and the Player.

== Honors and later years ==
In 1988, she was one of the charter inductees into the USA Field Hockey Hall of Fame.

In later years, Boyd lived in Plymouth Meeting, Pennsylvania. She died in January 2018 at age 85 as a result of complications from non-Hodgkin's lymphoma.
