= Alice Putnam Willetts =

American field hockey player (1926–2020)

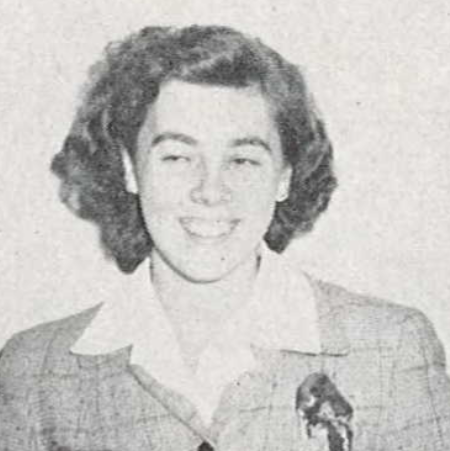
- Putnam from 1946 Temple yearbook

Personal information
- Born: February 26, 1926 Ridley, Pennsylvania, US
- Died: June 6, 2020 (aged 94) Swarthmore, Pennsylvania, US

Alice Putnam Willetts (February 6, 1926 – June 6, 2020), previously Alice Putnam, and sometimes known by the nickname "Putty", was an American field hockey and lacrosse player and coach. She played on the U.S. women's national field hockey team from 1946 to 1955 and was in the first class of inductees into the U.S. Field Hockey Association Hall of Fame.

== Early years ==
She was born in Ridley, Pennsylvania, on February 6, 1926. She graduated from Swarthmore High School in 1943. She played four years of basketball, lacrosse, and field hockey at Swarthmore High. She next attended Temple University where she competed in field hockey, basketball, and tennis. She graduated from Temple magna cum laude in 1947. She also introduced lacrosse to Temple and served as the school's lacrosse coach for three years.

== Field hockey career and honors ==
She was a member of the United States national field hockey team in 1946 and remained a member of the national team for nine years through 1955. She was also a member of the United States national women's lacrosse team for 12 years. Professionally, she taught and held other positions at a variety of educational institutions, including Swarthmore High School, Swarthmore College, Shipley School at Bryn Mawr, and Stath Haven High School.

In 1988, she became one of the charter inductees into the USA Field Hockey Hall of Fame. She was also inducted into the National Lacrosse Hall of Fame in 1998 and the Temple University Athletic Hall of Fame in 1977.

== Later years ==
After retiring, she became active in community affairs in Swarthmore, Pennsylvania, and founded the Swarthmore Senior Citizens Association. She died on June 6, 2020, at age 94.
