= Cynthia Wesson =

American athlete

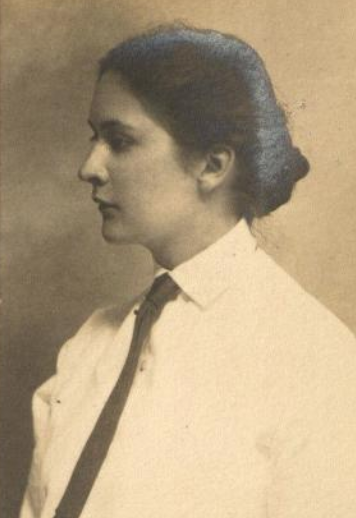
- Cynthia Wesson, from the 1909 yearbook of Bryn Mawr College
- Born: November 21, 1886; Springfield, Massachusetts, U.S.
- Died: April 4, 1981 (age 94); Cotuit, Massachusetts, U.S.
- Occupations: Athlete, physical educator
- Known for: President of US Field Hockey Association
- Relatives: Daniel Baird Wesson (grandfather)

Cynthia Maria Wesson (November 21, 1886 – April 4, 1981) was an American athlete and physical educator. She was a national champion on archery in 1915, taught at the University of Wisconsin, and was president of the United States Field Hockey Association.

== Early life and education ==
Cynthia Wesson was born in Springfield, Massachusetts, the daughter of Frank Luther Wesson and Sarah K. Lovell Wesson. Her grandfather was inventor Daniel B. Wesson. Her mother was from Montreal. Her father died in 1887, in a railroad accident, when she was still a baby. Her sister Mabel Wesson Murray wrote a book of poetry.

Wesson graduated from Bryn Mawr College in 1909. At Bryn Mawr, she played field hockey under British-born athletic director Constance Applebee, a founding member of the United States Field Hockey Association. She gained further training as a physical educator at the Sargent School for Physical Culture in Massachusetts.

== Career ==
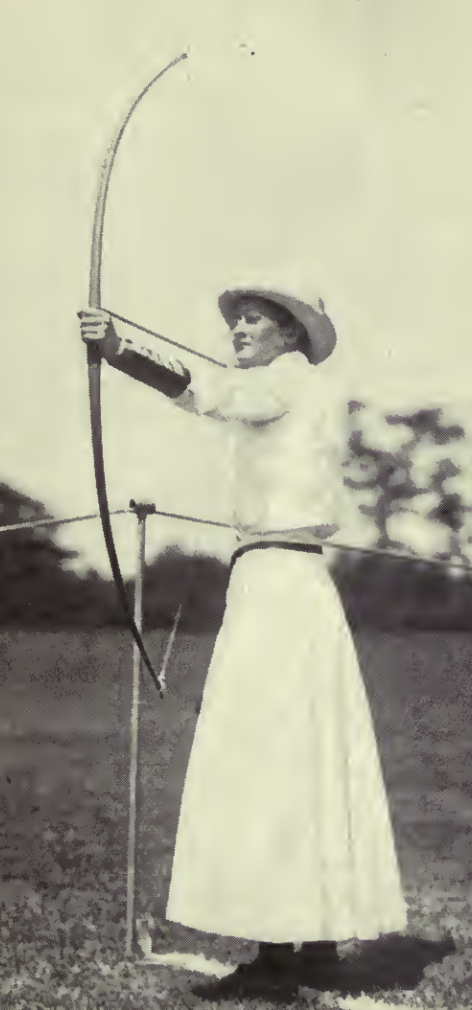
Cynthia Wesson in an archery competition, from a 1917 publication

Wesson was national women's champion in archery in 1915, 1916, and 1917, and again in 1920. Footage of her 1915 winning round appeared in newsreels, seen in theatres across the country. Her 1915 record score held until 1931, when it was broken by Dorothy Duggan. Wesson played field hockey on Boston's women's team in the 1920s, and was hurt on the field during a 1926 game. In the 1930s, she took up trap shooting.

Wesson taught and coached at the University of Wisconsin. She chaired the hockey committee of the American Physical Education Association in 1922. She was elected first vice-president of the United States Field Hockey Association in 1923, and became the organization's president in 1925. She defended the idea of college women's teams competing against one another, at a time when this was a matter of debate. She was associate editor of The Sportswoman magazine.

Wesson was named an honorary member of the USA Field Hockey Hall of Fame in 1929. Also in 1929, she taught at a summer institute in North Carolina for women coaches and physical educators. She remained active in the national leadership of women's archery and field hockey in 1930s and in 1940, when she joined Applebee at the College of William & Mary for the annual tournament. Also in 1940, she announced that the United States Field Hockey Association would buy an ambulance to donate to Great Britain during World War II.

== Publications ==
- "Lacrosse, a Game for Women and Girls" (1925)
- "Coaches in America" (1926)
- "Some Notes on Field and Track Athletics" (1927)
- "Miss C.M.K. Applebee: A Sketch of Forty Years of Service" (1941)

== Later years ==
In 1965, Wesson gave half a million dollars to the 900 employees of Smith & Wesson in Springfield, as granddaughter of the company's founder. Wesson died in 1981, at the age of 94, in Cotuit, Massachusetts.
