= Winchester High School (Massachusetts) =

Coordinates: 42°27′21.5″N 71°8′2.2″W

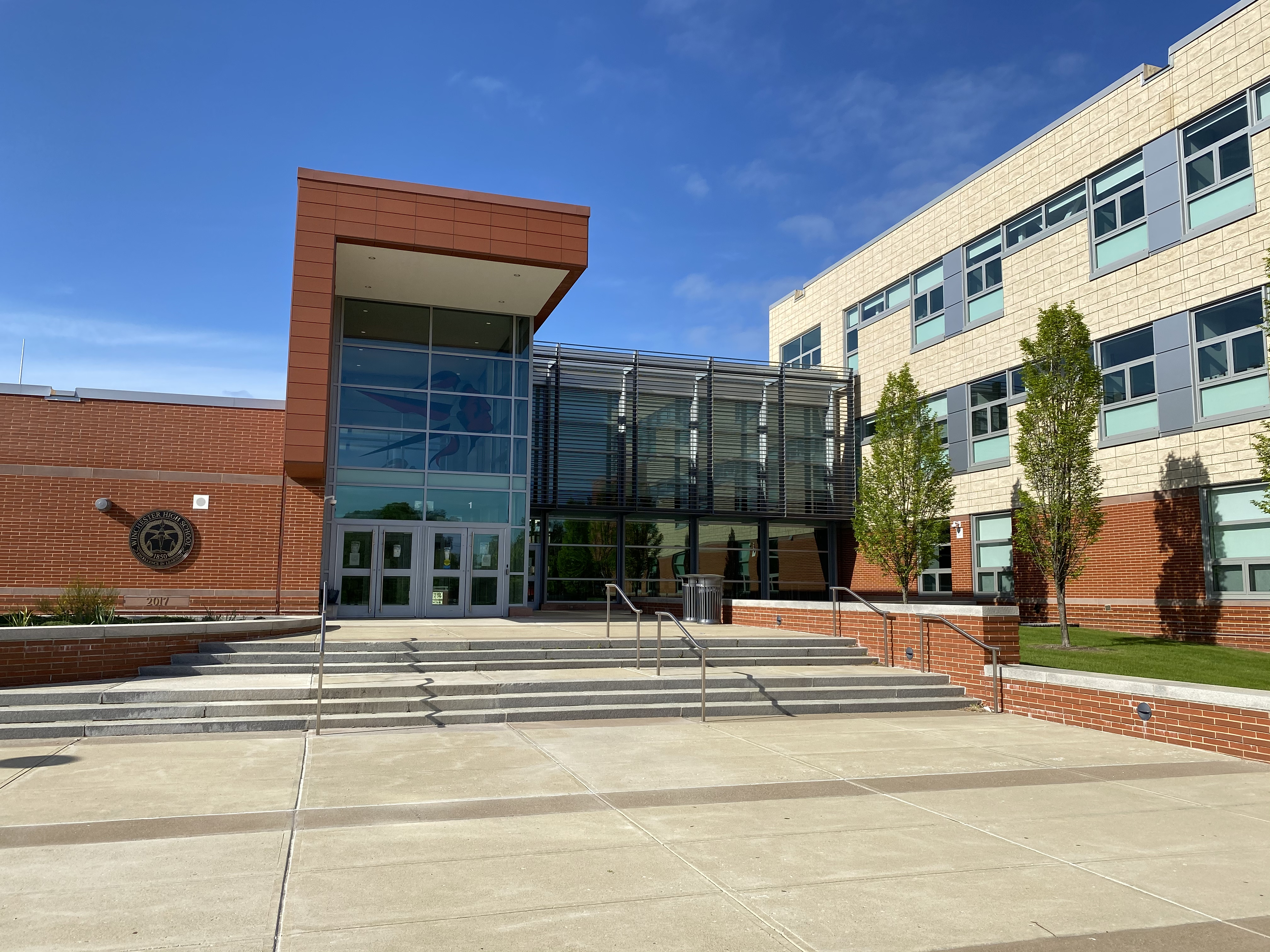
- 80 Skillings Road; Winchester, Massachusetts 01890; United States

Information
- Type: Public
- Established: 1850
- School district: Winchester, Massachusetts, U.S.
- Principal: Paula Conis (interim)
- Teaching staff: 94.81 (FTE)
- Grades: 9-12
- Enrollment: 1,404 (2024-2025)
- Student to teacher ratio: 14.81
- Colors: Red and black
- Team name: The Red & Black (formerly Sachems)
- Newspaper: The Red & Black
- Yearbook: The Aberjona
- Information: (781) 721-7020
- Website: School website

Winchester High School is a comprehensive 9–12 high school located in Winchester, Massachusetts, United States. Founded in 1850, it moved into its current location in the spring of 1972. Ranked 29th among Massachusetts High Schools, close to 98% of students graduated in 2023, with about 96% of those continuing to higher education.

A major three-phase reconstruction and expansion of the school started in 2014 and was completed in September 2017. Most of the school was rebuilt using the original structural frame. After the complete redesign of the interior of the building, approximately 75% of classrooms now have exterior windows and direct day-lighting versus 25% in 1972. The original internal courtyard was enclosed to create the two-story dining commons and assembly space. Winchester High School remained in use during construction.

== Sports ==
Winchester High School fields teams in the following sports:

Sports
Seasons	Boys and girls	Boys	Girls	Coed
Fall	Cross country, soccer	Football	Swimming, volleyball, cheerleading, field hockey	Golf
Winter	Basketball, ice hockey, indoor track, alpine skiing, Nordic skiing	Swimming		Gymnastics, wrestling
Spring	Tennis, lacrosse, track and field	Baseball, volleyball	Softball	Sailing, crew, ultimate Frisbee

== Notable alumni ==
- Pat Badger (Class of '85), bassist of the band Extreme
- Joe Bellino (Class of '56), halfback, Heisman Trophy winner in 1960 while at Navy; played with the Boston Patriots 1965–1967
- Bob Bigelow (Class of '71), college and NBA basketball player (University of Pennsylvania, Kansas City Kings, Boston Celtics)
- Anthony Carrigan, actor
- Kieran Corr (Class of '24), Kohl's #1 ranked national high school kicker, college football player (Harvard)
- Glen Doherty (Class of '88), Navy SEAL killed in 2012 Benghazi attack while working for a contracted CIA group
- Janet Doub Erickson (graphic artist and author, founder of the Blockhouse of Boston)
- Tony Fryklund (Class of '89), professional mixed martial arts fighter, formerly competing for Bellator MMA, WEC, Strikeforce, and UFC
- Brian Keefe (Class of ‘94), professional NBA basketball head coach, Washington Wizards
- Kofi Kingston (Class of '99), WWE wrestler
- Kirk Minihane (Class of '93), radio and podcast host
- Laurence Owen, while a student at Winchester, was the 1961 U.S. Ladies and North American Figure Skating Champion and placed 6th in the 1960 Winter Olympics in the same event
- Richard Phillips (Class of '73), captain of the Maersk Alabama when it was attacked by Somali pirates in April, 2009
- Bjorn Poonen (Class of '85), mathematician
- Alison Hersey Risch (Class of '54), captain of US Women's Lacrosse team 1964, member of the US field hockey HOF and the US lacrosse HOF
- Alicia Sacramone (Class of '06), won silver medal at the 2008 Summer Olympics in the Artistic Gymnastics Team All-Around Competition; 10-time World Championship medalist (making her the most decorated American gymnast of all time), 19-time national medalist, and 5-time U.S. vault champion
- Dan Spang (Class of '02), professional hockey player
- Levni Yilmaz, filmmaker, animator, creator of "Tales of Mere Existence"
