= Patricia Kenworthy Nuckols =

American field hockey player and aviator (1921–2022)

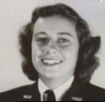
- Nuckols as a WASP pilot

Personal information
- Born: June 21, 1921 Philadelphia, Pennsylvania, U.S.
- Died: January 17, 2022 (aged 100) Manchester, Vermont, U.S.
- Military career
- Allegiance: United States
- Branch: Women Airforce Service Pilot
- Conflicts: World War II
- Awards: USA Field Hockey Hall of Fame; Congressional Gold Medal

Sport
- Country: (United States)
- Sport: Field Hockey
- Team: All-American women's field hockey team; All-American; U.S National Team

Patricia Kenworthy Nuckols (June 21, 1921 – January 17, 2022) was an American field hockey player and a pilot in the Women Airforce Service Pilots (WASP) during World War II. Prior to her marriage in 1948, she was known by her maiden name, Patricia Kenworthy.

== WASP service ==
Kenworthy enlisted in the WASP program during World War II despite falling short of the requirement that pilots have a height of five feet two inches (1.57 m). She managed to pass muster by "standing up exceedingly straight and generally brazening it out." She claimed to be five feet two-and-a-half inches and, training in the back seat of a Steerman, she used three pillows to see over the training pilot in the front seat. She was one of 1,800 women who were accepted into the WASP program. She was assigned to the Blytheville Army Air Field.

The WASP pilots were not recognized as military pilots until the 1970s. In 2010, Nuckols and approximately 200 other WASP pilots received the Congressional Gold Medal for their wartime service. The Vermont Legislature also passed a resolution honoring Nuckols for "her extraordinary military service as a World War II flying WASP."

== Field hockey player ==
Kenworthy was also a star field hockey player. In November 1940, she was selected as a first-team left back on the All-America women's field hockey team. She was also selected as a reserve player on the 1939 All-America team and as a first-team All-American in 1941.

She resumed playing field hockey as a center halfback after the war and traveled to Europe in 1948 as part of the U.S. national team. In 1988, she became one of the charter inductees into the USA Field Hockey Hall of Fame.

== Personal life ==
Kenworthy Nuckols was born on June 21, 1921, in Philadelphia, Pennsylvania. She was married in 1948 to E. Marshall Nuckols, who became a senior executive at Campbell's. She died in Manchester, Vermont, on January 17, 2022, at the age of 100.
