= Chickie Geraci Poisson =

American field hockey player

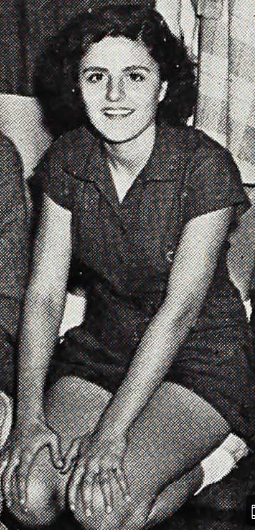
- Geraci from the 1947 Clifford J. Scott HS yearbook

Personal information
- Full name: Angela Marie Geraci Poisson
- Born: June 18, 1931 (age 95) East Orange, New Jersey, US

Angela Marie "Chickie" Geraci Poisson, formerly Angelea Marie Geraci (born June 18, 1931), is an American former field hockey player and coach. She played on U.S. women's national field hockey team from 1953 to 1963 and was in the first class of inductees into the U.S. Field Hockey Association Hall of Fame.

== Early years ==
She was born Angela Marie Geraci in 1931 at East Orange, New Jersey, and attended Clifford Scott High School in that city. She attended Trenton State College (later renamed The College of New Jersey).

== Professional and athletic career ==
After graduating from college, Geraci taught at the Southern Seminary Junior College in Buena Vista, Virginia, Sweet Briar College in Sweet Briar, Virginia, and later as a tutor for five years at Vassar College. In 1962, she was hired by the University of Bridgeport as a physical education instructor and coach of the school's field hockey team.

She was first selected to the U.S. national field hockey team in 1953 and made the first team in 1955. She was the team's captain from at least 1958 to 1962. At least one source indicates that she remained as the team's captain in 1963. She also served as a game official in five sports, including field hockey, basketball, and volleyball.

== Family ==
She was married in 1963 to Francis W. Poisson, the athletic trainer at the University of Bridgeport. Her husband later became the school's athletic director and died in 2019. They had been married for 56 years and had three sons.

== Honors ==
In 1988, she became one of the charter inductees into the USA Field Hockey Hall of Fame. She was also inducted into the Trenton State College Hall of Fame in 1982, the University of Bridgeport Hall of Fame in 1988, the New Agenda/Northeast Women Hall of Fame in 1992, and the Connecticut Women's Basketball Hall of Fame (as a referee) in 1997.
