= Kirshner =

Kirshner may refer to:

- Andy Kirshner, American composer, performer, writer, and media artist
- David-Seth Kirshner (born 1973), American rabbi
- Don Kirshner (1934–2011), American music publisher, consultant, producer, talent manager, and songwriter
- Lev Kirshner (born 1969), American soccer player and coach
- Mia Kirshner (born 1975), Canadian actress, writer, and social activist
- Rebecca Rand Kirshner (born 1974), American television writer and producer
- Ricky Kirshner, American television producer
- Robert Kirshner (born 1949), American astronomer
