= Vonnie Gros =

American field hockey player

Personal information
- Born: c. 1935 Camden, NJ

Vonnie Gros (c. 1935- Feb 28, 2026) was an American field hockey player, coach, and one of the charter inductees into the USA Field Hockey Hall of Fame. Gros attended Ursinus College where she captained the college's field hockey team. She later coached the field hockey teams at West Chester and Princeton. She also served as the head coach of the U.S. national team for several years and of the U.S. Olympic team at the 1980 (boycotted) and 1984 Summer Olympics (bronze medal). She was inducted into the USA Field Hockey Hall of Fame in 1988.
