= Anne Lee Delano =

Anne Lee Delano was a prominent figure in the history of collegiate and international women's field hockey and women's lacrosse. She was both an honored participant, coach, author and association official.

== Collegiate career ==
Delano was an All-American in both field hockey and lacrosse for Northeastern University from which she graduated in 1935. Delano is one of the women's athletics pioneers and one of the six original inductees to the Northeastern University athletics Hall of Fame for her accomplishments in field hockey and lacrosse.

== International career ==
Delano was the captain of the U.S. Touring Field Hockey Team that traveled to England, Scotland, and the Netherlands in 1948. Delano was also the captain of the U.S. Touring Volleyball Team to Great Britain in 1951.

== Academic and collegiate coaching career ==
Delano received her M.A. from Columbia University. She then served as lecturer in Hygiene and Physical Education at Wellesley College, ( 1950-1952?nk) and then as associate professor of physical education at Smith College for a number of years (1953-?).

Delano then coached lacrosse and served as director of physical education and director of athletics at Bryn Mawr College from 1969 to 1980. Bryn Mawr has since 1983 honored the outstanding senior scholar-athlete who exhibits scholarship, athletic excellence, and college service with its Ann Lee Delano award. At its inception in 1983, it was the most prestigious award given by the Department of Athletics.

Delano also served as the vice-president of the United States Field Hockey Association and the United States Women's Lacrosse Association. She was also the chairman of the 50th Anniversary United States Field Hockey Association.

== Publications ==
- Delano, Anne L. and Ritchey, Betty eds., Official Field Hockey-Lacrosse Guide 1948-1950. New York: A.S. Barnes, 1948.
- Delano, Anne L., "Shall we Officiate our Own Games?" JOHPER: Journal of Health, Physical Education, Recreation, Volume 27, (December 1956) pp. 20,58.
- Delano, Anne Lee Field Hockey. Dubuque Iowa: W.C. Brown Co., 1966.
- Delano, Anne Lee Lacrosse for Girls and Women. Dubuque Iowa: W.C. Brown Co., 1970.
