= Mary Ann Leight Harris =

American field hockey player

Personal information
- Born: 1939 (age 86–87)

Mary Ann Leight Harris, formerly Mary Ann Leight (born 1939), is a former American field hockey player and coach.

She graduated from North Penn High School and attended Temple University. She was a multi-sport athlete who received nine varsity letters at Temple. She was a member of the United States national field hockey team from 1958 to 1973 and the team captain from 1971 to 1973.

She later worked as a teacher and coach at Springfield High School, Sidwell Friends School, and Souderton High School. She compiled over 300 wins as a field hockey coach, and her teams won nine conference championships.

In 1988, she became one of the charter inductees into the USA Field Hockey Hall of Fame. She was also inducted into the Temple University Athletic Hall of Fame in 1982.
