= Joseph Muller (collector) =

- Born: April 24, 1883; Germany
- Died: May 9, 1939 (aged 56); Closter, New Jersey
- Employer(s): J. P. Morgan, New York Public Library
- Known for: The Star Spangled Banner: words and music issued between 1814-1864: an annotated bibliographical list with notices of the different versions, texts, variants, musical arrangements, and notes on music publishers in the United States

Joseph Muller (April 24, 1883—May 9, 1939) was a musician, artist, author, researcher, collector and world traveler. Known as a specialist in American music who worked for the New York Public Library, he amassed a personal collection of several thousand engravings and lithographs. Upon his death, his collection was donated to the Music Division of the New York Public Library.

== Biography ==
Born in Germany, his desire for travel led him to become a sailor. He was a steward on private yachts (including one owned by J. P. Morgan) and visited many countries. Through his travels he became knowledgeable in music and a collector.

In 1930 he left Morgan's employ and became a staff member of the Music Division of the New York Public Library, specializing in American music. He held that position until his death. While at the Library he formalized the Music Division's Iconography collection and became its first curator.

Muller's main interest was in 19th century American music. He was known for his book Bibliography of Francis Scott Key's 'The Star Spangled Banner and for his portraits of classical musicians. He was an authority on Stephen Foster and lent his skills to the Foster Hall archive, now known as the Stephen Foster Collection and archive. An amateur artist, many of Muller's drawings of people and localities associated with Foster are now part of that collection. Muller's portrait of Stephen Foster was the basis of the U.S. postal stamp first issued in Bardstown, Kentucky on May 3, 1940.

He sold his collection of materials related to the Star Spangled Banner (consisting of about 200 items) to the Library of Congress.

At the time of his death he was living in Closter, New Jersey.

== Publications ==
- Muller, Joseph (1932), "Haydn Portraits", Musical Quarterly, 18 (2): 282–98, doi:10.1093/mq/XVIII.2.282, JSTOR 738738
- Muller, Joseph (1935). "Bach Portraits". Musical Quarterly. 21 (2): 155–65. doi:10.1093/mq/XXI.2.155. JSTOR 738833.
- Muller, Joseph (1935). The Star spangled banner: words and music issued between 1814-1864: an annotated bibliographical list with notices of the different versions, texts, variants, musical arrangements, and notes on music publishers in the United States. New York: G. A. Baker & Co.
- Muller, Joseph (1939), "Musical Iconography", Bulletin of the American Musicological Society (3): 6–8, doi:10.2307/829404, JSTOR 829404

== Sources ==
- Levy, Lester S. (1983). "Sheet Music Buffs and Their Collections: A Personal Memoir". American Music. 1 (4). University of Illinois: 90–99. doi:10.2307/3051781. JSTOR 3051781.
- "Obituaries". Foster Hall Bulletin (12). Pittsburgh: University of Pittsburgh: 9. July 4, 1940.
- Redway, Virginia Larkin (1941). Music Directory of Early New York City. New York: New York Public Library.
