= Ronald C. Kichline =

American football and basketball coach (1895–1956)

Biographical details
- Born: January 4, 1895; Bangor, Pennsylvania, U.S.
- Died: January 20, 1956 (aged 61); Reading, Pennsylvania, U.S.

Playing career

Football
- 1912–1915: Ursinus

Coaching career (HC unless noted)

Football
- 1916–1920: Mansfield
- 1921: Juniata
- 1925–1930: Ursinus
- 1942–1944: Reading HS (PA) (interim HC)

Basketball
- 1917–1920: Mansfield
- 1921–1922: Juniata

Head coaching record
- Overall: 41–54–5 (college football); 28–10 (college basketball)

Accomplishments and honors

Championships
- Football; 1 Eastern Pennsylvania Collegiate (1930)

Ronald Chester Kichline (January 4, 1895 – January 20, 1956) was an American football and basketball coach. He served as the head football coach (1916 1920) and head men's basketball coach (1917–1920) at Mansfield University of Pennsylvania. Kichline spent the 1921–22 academic year serving in the same roles at Juniata College in Huntingdon, Pennsylvania. He spent the final years of his college coaching career as the head football coach his alma mater, Ursinus College in Collegeville, Pennsylvania, from 1925 to 1930. After retiring from college coach, he work in the insurance industry and as a teacher. He was an interim head coach at Reading Senior High School in Reading, Pennsylvania while their regular coach was serving in World War II.

== Head coaching record ==
=== College football ===
Year	Team	Overall	Conference	Standing	Bowl/playoffs
Mansfield Mountaineers (Independent) (1916–1920)
1916	Mansfield	3–4			
1917	Mansfield	6–4			
1918	Mansfield	3–1			
1919	Mansfield	4–4			
1920	Mansfield	6–2–1			
Mansfield:		22–15–1			
Juniata Indians (Independent) (1921)
1921	Juniata	0–8			
Juniata:		0–8			
Ursinus Bears (Independent) (1925)
1925	Ursinus	2–6–1			
Ursinus Bears (Eastern Pennsylvania Collegiate Conference / Central Pennsylvania Conference) (1926–1930)
1926	Ursinus	1–8	1–1	3rd	
1927	Ursinus	5–4	2–1	2nd	
1928	Ursinus	3–6	2–1	2nd	
1929	Ursinus	2–4–3	1–1–1	3rd	
1930	Ursinus	6–3	3–1	1st	
Ursinus:		19–31–4	9–5–1		
Total:		41–54–5			
National championship Conference title Conference division title or championship game berth
