= Mary H. Van Brunt =

American economist and academic administrator

39th president of Spring Hill College
- Incumbent
- Assumed office January 1, 2023
- Preceded by: E. Joseph Lee II

Personal details
- Education: Ursinus College (BA); Saint Joseph's University (MBA); Lehigh University (PhD)

Mary H. Van Brunt is an American economist and academic administrator. She has served as the 39th president of Spring Hill College since January 1, 2023, becoming the first woman to hold the position in the institution's 192-year history.

== Early life and education ==
Mary H. Van Brunt earned a B.A. degree in economics from Ursinus College. She pursued further education at Saint Joseph's University, where she obtained a M.B.A. in accounting. She completed her academic training with a Ph.D. in economics from Lehigh University.

== Career ==
Van Brunt has over 20 years of experience in Catholic higher education leadership. She served as the founding academic dean of the School of Business, Arts, and Media at Cabrini University, where she worked for nearly 17 years. During her tenure, she was also an economics professor and received awards such as the National Center for Education Statistics (NCES)/AEFA New Scholar Dissertation Award, the Warren York Fellowship, and the Charles R. and Mary F. Lindback Foundation Award for Excellence in Teaching.

In addition to her academic roles, Van Brunt has worked in the banking, securities, and pharmaceutical industries for 12 years. She held leadership positions at Gwynedd Mercy University, including provost and vice president for academic affairs. On January 1, 2023, Van Brunt became the 39th president of Spring Hill College, marking the first time a woman held this position in the institution's 192-year history. She succeeded E. Joseph Lee II.

Van Brunt's responsibilities have included strategic planning, program development, fundraising, and team-building initiatives. She is also a published author, consultant, certified global business professional, and a former certified management accountant.
