= Gwen Cheeseman =

American field hockey player

Personal information
- Full name: Gwen Wentz Cheeseman-Alexander
- Born: August 13, 1951 (age 74) Harrisburg, Pennsylvania, U.S.
Medal record
Women's Field Hockey
Representing the United States
Olympic Games
Bronze medal – third place	1984 Los Angeles	Team competition

Gwen Wentz Cheeseman-Alexander (born August 13, 1951, in Harrisburg, Pennsylvania) is a former field hockey goalkeeper from the United States, who was a member of the 1980 Olympic team that qualified for Olympics but did not compete due to the Olympic Committee's boycott of the 1980 Summer Olympics in Moscow, Russia. She was one of 461 athletes to receive a Congressional Gold Medal years later. She was a member of the team that won the bronze medal at the 1984 Summer Olympics in Los Angeles, California. She was also the goal keeper of the world in 1980. She coached many Division 1 teams and currently is a goalie coach at Washington and Lee University.
