= Pierce E. Swope =

American clergyman (1884-1968)

Pierce Edward Swope (August 15, 1884 — December 9, 1968) was an American German Reformed clergyman and prominent author in the Pennsylvania German language. Swope was born in Meckville, Pennsylvania (Berks County), and was a graduate of Lebanon Valley College and Ursinus College. He was ordained on July 31, 1913. His dialect pseudonym was Der Kaspar Hufnagel; beginning in 1947, he used this name over a weekly Pennsylvania German column for the Lebanon Daily News. He also wrote "Was Saagt Der ... Kaspar Hufnagel" for the Ephrata Ensign from 1948 to 1951. Swope was the first person formally licensed to teach Pennsylvania German in public schools.

Swope married Carrie Mable Hauer (1885-1972) on January 6, 1906, in Hamlin, Pennsylvania and received an honorary doctor of divinity degree from Ursinus in 1940. He died in Annville, Pennsylvania and is buried in Hamlin.

== Works ==
- Pennsylvania Dutch Essays and Poems (1968)
