= David-Seth Kirshner =

American rabbi (born 1973)

- Born: 1973 (age 52–53); Closter, New Jersey, US
- Occupations: Rabbi, activist

David-Seth Kirshner (born 1973), is an American rabbi and activist, who has served in Temple Emanu-El, in Closter, New Jersey.

Prior to becoming a congregational rabbi, he worked at the Jewish Theological Seminary, which he joined in 1999, serving as Senior Director of Institutional Advancement, overseeing the Seminary's development and outreach efforts. For five years, Kirshner also served as spiritual leader for the Hebrew Congregation of Fitzgerald, in Southern Georgia.

Rabbi Kirshner holds the following positions of leadership:

- President of the (2012–14) New York Board of Rabbis
- President of the (2017–19) North Jersey Board of Rabbis
- Appointed to NJ Israel Commission by Governor Chris Christie (2012. Re-appointed (2x) by Governor Phil Murphy
- Member of the Chancellor's Rabbinic Cabinet at the Jewish Theological Seminary
- Kellogg School of Rabbinic Management at Northwestern University, Inaugural class
- UJC Rabbinic Cabinet
- Former Board member of the Solomon Schechter Day School of Bergen County
- Former Board Member of the Leffell School (Westchester)
- National Council of the American Israel Public Affairs Committee (AIPAC)
- Hartman Fellow in Jerusalem
- Adjunct faculty at Academy for Jewish Religion (AJR)
- Executive Officer of the Jewish Federations of North America (JFNA)

He and his wife have been residents of Closter, New Jersey.

Rabbi Kirshner is the author of Streams of Shattered Consciousness: A Chronicle of the First 50 days of the Israel Hamas War (Xlibris). There are more than 10,000 copies of his book in circulation and he has travelled all over America and cities in Europe to discuss his book and advocate his Zionism.

He has written articles and been featured in many media sources and is regularly published in the Jewish Standard, The Times of Israel, The Bergen Record and The New York Times.

Rabbi Kirshner holds a BA degree from York University in Toronto, Canada and earned an MA in Hebrew Letters and Rabbinic Ordination from the Jewish Theological Seminary of America. Rabbi Kirshner is married to 'Dori Frumin Kirshner.
