= Speedball (art products) =

US stationery and art product manufacturing company

Speedball Art Products Co., LLC
- Formerly: C. Howard Hunt Pen Co. (1899–c. 1969); Hunt Manufacturing Co. (c. 1969–97); Speedball (1997–present)
- Company type: Private (LLC)
- Industry: Stationery; Visual arts
- Founded: 1899; 127 years ago
- Founder: C. Howard Hunt
- Headquarters: Statesville, North Carolina, USA
- Area served: Worldwide
- Key people: George Bartol (1903–17); George Bartol Jr. (1917–69); George Bartol III (1956–?)
- Products: Art materials Writing implements Printmaking
- Revenue: $20 to $50 million
- Website: speedballart.com

Speedball is a US manufacturing company of stationery and art products, based in Statesville, North Carolina. The company was originally established as the "C. Howard Hunt Pen Company" in 1899, to manufacture dip pens.

Over the years, and throughout the acquisition of other companies, Hunt expanded its range of product to stationery, office supplies, and even furniture. After major restructuring and divestiture in the 1990s, Hunt sold its fine art product lines, which became Speedball Art Products Co., L.L.C. in 1997, originally a brand of pen launched by the company in 1915.

Speedball currently produces and markets a wide range of products that include printmaking, writing implements and art materials.

== History ==
In 1899, C. Howard Hunt formed his own company and established it in Camden, New Jersey. To start his business, Hunt brought several pen makers from Birmingham, England. George E. Bartol, a Philadelphia grain and commodities exporter, was among its shareholders. In 1903, Bartol became president and director of the company, where he remained until 1917. The company had a production of about 45,000 pens a day from rolled sheets of steel. In 1913, the "A"-series, a dip pen for calligraphy purposes, is patented by Ross F. George and William H. Gordon. Two years later, the Hunt company partnered with George, releasing the Speedball A-series dip nib. In 1916, the "B"-series is released, while the "C"-series was launched in 1918. After Bartol resigned as president of the company, his son George Jr, was appointed for the charge. Bartol Jr. would remain as president for over 50 years, retiring in 1969.

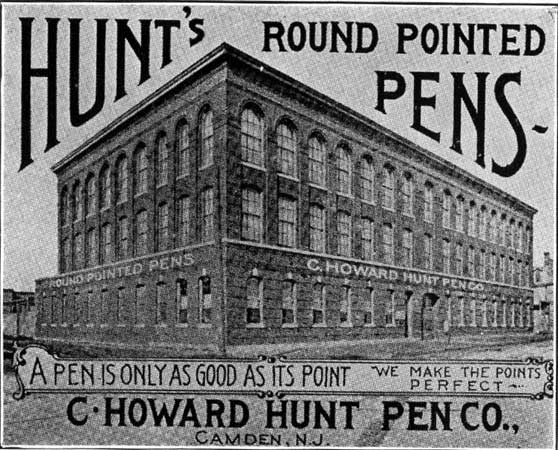
Hunt advertisement of 1915, depicting company's factory in Camden, NY

The original pen's "A-style nib" developed by Ross had a square-tipped head that made broad lines, which worked well for some of Ross' numerous lettering styles. The "B-style Nib" had a round section at the head of the nib that would round off the beginning and the ending of each pen stroke. The "C-style Nib" is the chisel-point nib that creates thick and thin lines depending on the angle the pen is held. The C-style nibs are a favorite of many calligraphers. The "D-style", an oval shaped head nib, created an italic/gothic style to the letters that it produced. All of these nibs had Ross' signature brass reservoir. The E-style was the steel brush. George took the patent to the C. Howard Hunt Pen Company in 1915. They manufactured each of the above nibs in different sizes and published the Speedball Text Book, a periodical manual written by George which contained updated samples of numerous lettering artists' work, including Ross' past instructor William Hugh Gordon. The "steel brushes" were made in four sizes, also chisel pointed, but in larger sizes than the C-Style nibs. The steel brushes also fit in the same size nib holders that are used for the smaller nibs.

In 1925 Hunt acquired the "Boston Specialty Company", manufacturer of Boston Pencil Pointers, a line of pencil sharpeners. Throughout the Great Depression, Hunt reduced operations, then recovering with the development of some pens. In 1942, regulations on stainless steel stopped production of pencil sharpeners and specialty metal items. The sale of silver alloy nibs kept the company viable during World War II.

George Bartol III, joined the C. Howard Hunt Pen Company in 1946, first as an apprentice in the company's manufacturing department. He would later succeed his father as president in 1956. In 1969, he also became chairman of the board. Bartol's leadership transformed the small, family-owned C. Howard Hunt Pen Company into the publicly held "Hunt Manufacturing Company".

Hunt last logo

In 1957, the factory moved from Camden to Statesville, North Carolina, while the offices were relocated in Pennsauken, NJ in 1963 and then to Philadelphia in 1965. Notable events during those years include the company's arranging for the immigration of expert pen makers from England, and its sponsorship of sports teams in Camden's amateur and industrial leagues.

By the 1990s, Hunt marketed a large range of products that included (apart from its pens) papers, markers, utility knives, drawing boards, office furniture, office supplies, and roller laminators. The company offered them through its own brand as subsidiaries such as X-Acto, Bienfang, Conté, Boston, or Stabilo.

On 14 November 1997, Walt Glazer, purchased the Speedball division from Hunt Corporation. As a result, the independent company "Speedball Art Products Co., L.L.C. was formed, and former Hunt pens started to be commercialized under the Speedball brand.

== Products ==
The following is a list of current products manufactured and marketed by Speedball. The company also markets in the US products by other manufacturers, such as the ArtGraf brand of graphite putties and sticks by Portuguese company Viarco, and drawing charcoal sticks by British company Coates Charcoal.

| Type | Products |
|---|---|
| Printmaking | Blocks, screens, emulsions, inks, gel plates, etching presses, brayers, block cutting tool sets |
| Drawing & lettering | Dip pens, holders, inks, pen cleaners, fountain pens, markers |
| Art materials | Brushes, papers, potter's wheels, underglazes, bats, stools, graphite putties and sticks, charcoal sticks, metal leafs, rubber cements, acrylic paints, brush cleaners, palettes |

=== Broad edge nibs ===
Speedball makes nibs for dip pens in a variety of sizes. There are also a series of left handed nibs, designated LC, available in the same sizes as the C-0 through C-4. In the 1940s Speedball introduced the 'Flicker' Series of pens in the B style designated FB, named for the brass reservoir that flicks open for easy cleaning. The sizes for their different series flat-tipped pens (such as for Italic writing) are given below:

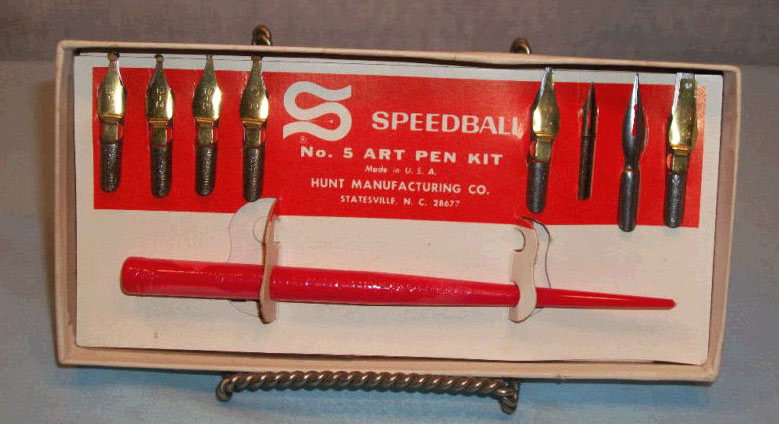
A vintage Speedball art kit

| A-Style Sizes | Nib Width | B-Style Sizes | Nib Width | C-Style Sizes | Nib Width | D-Style Sizes | Nib Width | E-Style Sizes | Nib Width |
|---|---|---|---|---|---|---|---|---|---|
| A-0 | 4.928mm | B-0/FB-0 | 5.842mm | C-0/LC-0 | 4.623mm | D-00 | 7mm | E-3/4 | 3/4 in. |
| A-1 | 3.175mm | B-1/2/FB-1/2 | 4.318mm | C-1/LC-1 | 3.251mm | D-0 | 6mm | E-1/2 | 1/2 in. |
| A-2 | 2.2098mm | B-1/FB-1 | 2.946mm | C-2/LC-2 | 2.718mm | D-1 | 4mm | E-3/8 | 3/8 in. |
| A-3 | 1.828mm | B-2/FB-2 | 2.54mm | C-3/LC-3 | 1.727mm | D-2 | 3mm | E-1/4 | 1/4 in. |
| A-4 | 1.143mm | B-3/FB-3 | 2.134mm | C-4/LC-4 | 1.27mm | D-3 | 2.5mm | | |
| A-5 | 0.4572mm | B-4/FB-4 | 1.676mm | C-5 | 0.6858mm | D-4 | 2mm | | |
| | | B-5/FB-5 | 1.372mm | C-6 | 0.4064mm | D-5 | 1.5mm | | |
| | | B-5-1/2 | 0.8636mm | | | D-6 | 1mm | | |
| | | B-6/FB-6 | 0.381mm | | | | | | |

Production of the D series pen nibs ended before 2015.

=== Flexible point nibs ===
Lines of fine point nibs by Speedball are:

| Number | Comm. name | Point |
|---|---|---|
| 22 B | Extra Fine | Medium |
| 56 | Standard School | Fine |
| 99 | Drawing | Extra fine |
| 100 | Artist | Medium |
| 101 | Imperial Artist | Extra fine |
| 102 | Crow Quill | Very fine |
| 103 | Mapping | Very fine |
| 104 | Finest Drawing | Super fine |
| 107 | Hawk Quill | Super fine |
| 108 | Litho Hawk Quill | Super fine |
| 512 | Bowl Pointed | Fine |
| 513 EF | Globe | Extra fine |

There are numerous other points no longer available including the 98 Stiff Falcon, 513 Globe Fine, and 788 Global Point.

=== Penholders ===
| Model | Type | Used for nibs |
|---|---|---|
| 9452 | Straight | #102, 107, 108 |
| 9454 | Straight | #100, 103, 104 |
| 9466 | Straight | Styles A, B, C, D, E |
| 9451 | Straight | Styles A, B, C, D, E |
| 9455 | Oblique | Copperplating |

== Lettering Manuals ==
Hunt and Speedball Art have published lettering manuals since 1915, when Gordon and George first published Presenting The Speedball Pen. As new pen types were developed they added fonts and expanded the book. The D-series was introduced in the 1926 9th Edition. The steel brush E series was introduced in 1960. The latest edition is the 25th published in 2021. They include instruction on many font types using their nibs and pens and provide many examples. Jimmy Kimmel used his 1960 edition as a ready reference when doing his art work.

== Artists ==
Speedball and Hunt pens have been widely used by a legion of comic strip and comic book artists to ink their pages. Hunt pens were the choice of Walt Simonson, Dale Keown, Bob McLeod, Kevin Nowlan, Bill Sienkiewicz, Joe Sinnott, Mark Morales and Andy Lanning (#102 model), George Pérez (#100), Mike DeCarlo (#103), Drew Geraci (#22) and Joe Rubinstein (#100, 103). Carl Barks' wife lettered his comics with a Speedball A-5 or B-6, although Barks himself was an Esterbrook enthusiastic. In House Industries Lettering Manual, Ken Barber calls out the Speedball pens as personal favorites.
