= Ruth Heller Aucott =

American field hockey player

Ruth Aucott
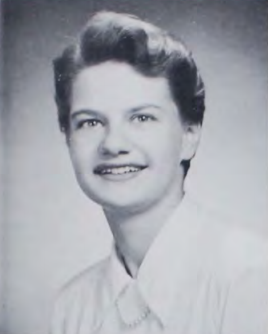
- Aucott from 1956 Ursinus yearbook

Personal information
- Born: c. 1934 (age 91–92) Abington, Pennsylvania, U.S.

Ruth Heller Aucott (born c. 1934) is an American former field hockey player and official. She played on the U.S. women's national field hockey team seven times from 1955 to 1967 and was in the first class of inductees into the U.S. Field Hockey Association Hall of Fame.

== Early years ==
She grew up in the Philadelphia area and attended Cheltenham High School, graduating in 1952.

She attended Ursinus College from 1952 to 1956 and won four varsity letters each in basketball, tennis, and field hockey. As a senior, she was selected by the United States Field Hockey Association (USFHA) as a first-team All-American. She was the first college player to be selected as an All-American. She was also valedictorian of the Ursinus Class of 1956.

== Sports career ==
She played on the U.S. national team seven times from 1955 to 1967 and on international touring teams that played in Australia in 1956 and Holland in 1959.

She later served as an umpire and member of the USFHA Rules Committee. In 1988, she was one of the charter inductees into the USA Field Hockey Hall of Fame. She has also been inducted into the Ursinus Hall of Fame and the Summit County Hall of Fame.

Aucott also excelled in golf and tennis. She won the Akron women's tennis championship in 1962 and won the Ohio Senior Women's Golf Tournament in 1987.

== Family ==
Aucott was married to George W. Aucott in 1956. They lived for many years in the Akron, Ohio, area where George became the president and chief operating officer of Firestone Tire and Rubber Company.
