= Joan Moser =

American field hockey player

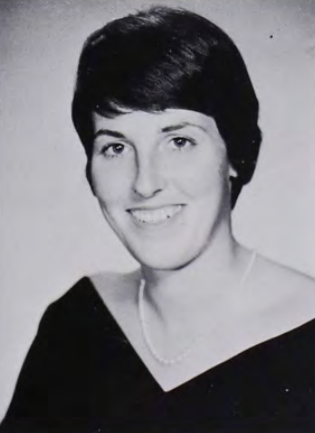
- Moser from the 1968 Ursinus yearbook

Personal information
- Full name: Joan Elaine Moser
- Born: c. 1946 (age 79–80)

Joan Elaine Moser (born c. 1946) is an American former field hockey and softball player. She played on the U.S. women's national field hockey team from 1967 to 1979 and was in the first class of inductees into the U.S. Field Hockey Association Hall of Fame. She also played for the world champion Raybestos Brakettes softball team.

== Early years ==
Joan Moser graduated from Cheltenham High School in 1964 and attended Ursinus College. She earned four varsity letters in field hockey and was the team captain as a senior. The Ursinus field hockey team lost only one game during the years (1964–1967) that Moser played.

== Field hockey and softball career ==
Moser was a member of the U.S. women's national field hockey team from 1966 to 1977. She also played on international touring teams in Germany (1967), New Zealand (1971), Holland (1973), Scotland (1975), and Trinidad (1978). She was a member of the United States national champion indoor hockey team in 1987.

She played professional softball for the Glenettes in 1968 and for the Telford Wanderers in 1970. She was a member of the Raybestos Brakettes' 1974 world championship softball team.

From 1968 to 1985, Moser worked as a teacher and coach (field hockey, basketball, and softball) at North Penn High School in Towamencin Township, Pennsylvania. Her softball teams won nineteen league championships and three state championships. She later coached the Ursinus softball team.

== Honors ==
In 1988, with the establishment of the USA Field Hockey Hall of Fame, Moser was honored as one of its charter inductees.
