= Mary Harris (murderer) =

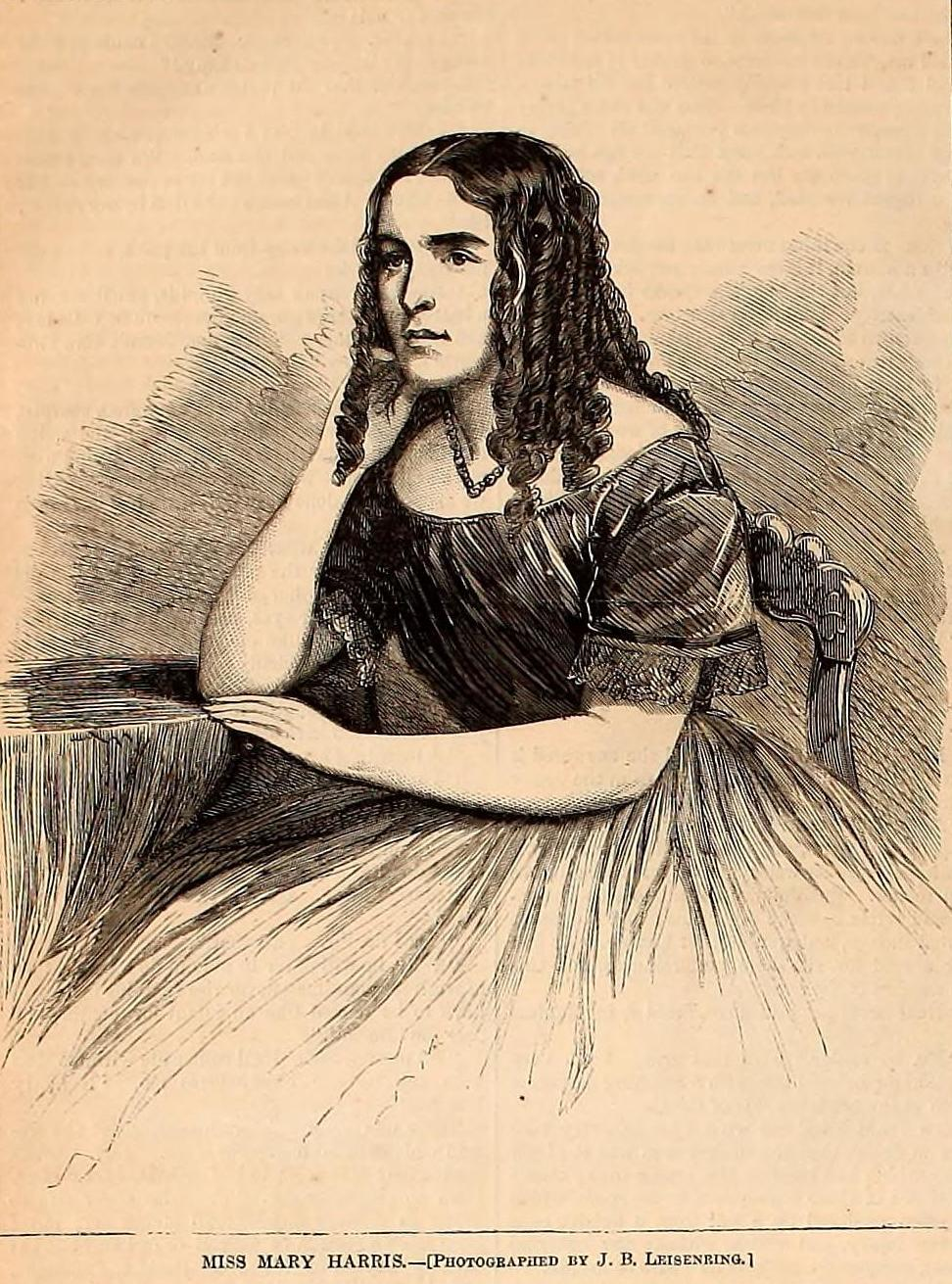
Mary Harris

Mary Harris was an American woman who murdered Adoniram Burroughs. Her trial marked the "first time in a U.S. court-room that expert medical testimony supported a plea of paroxysmal [temporary] insanity in a murder defense."

== Biography ==
Mary Harris was born in a poor, family in Burlington, Iowa. She received very little education, and worked at a hatmaking shop for much of her early life. While working at the shop, Adoniram Judson Burroughs fell in love with her. He courted her for much of the next three years, providing money and a basic education to Harris. Burroughs soon moved to Chicago, in search of better business prospects. When Harris turned eighteen, Burroughs asked her to travel to Chicago to be with him. Burroughs soon found work in Washington D. C., and moved yet again.

Burroughs continued to write, and on September 8, 1863 Harris received an unsigned letter that she assumed was that of Burroughs. Harris, unsure sent a reply to the letter, and asked the postal clerk to find out who the letter was to. The person who picked up the letter looked "very like" Burroughs. Harris went to the address that the letters came from, and found no one there. Harris soon found that Burroughs had married another woman.

Harris, distraught, engaged in events of increasingly erratic behavior, until she found where Adoniram Burroughs had been living, and shot him twice outside his office on 31 January 1865. In the subsequent trial, Harris pled insanity, and her lawyer, Joseph H. Bradley, supported her. The case, tried between 3 July and 19 July, began to attract media attention, with the Washington Evening Star being the first to publish details. The New York Times soon picked up on the story as well, and published it as front-page news. The jury eventually returned a verdict of 'not guilty'.

== Bibliography ==
- Carlson, A. Cheree (2008). The Crimes of Womanhood. University of Illinois Press. pp. 39–68.
- Spiegel, Allen D.; Suskind, Peter B. (December 1995). "A paroxysmal insanity plea in an 1865 murder trial". Journal of Legal Medicine. 16 (4): 585–606. doi:10.1080/01947649509510994.
- Chambers-Schiller, Lee (March 1999). "Seduced, Betrayed, and Revenged: The Murder Trial of Mary Harris". In Michael A. Bellesiles (ed.). Lethal Imagination: Violence and Brutality in American History. NYU Press. pp. 185–209. ISBN 978-0-8147-1295-5.
