= Speedball (American ball game) =

Ball sport

Speedball is a fast-paced sport that combines many aspects of other sports. Points are scored by throwing or kicking the ball into the opposing goal.It is played with two teams of at most five, each with one goalie on a basketball court or soccer field (depending on variant).

== History ==
The game was invented by Elmer D. Mitchell in 1921 at the University of Michigan. Elmer was a physical education professor, who sought to develop a game that was not restrictive to the rules of any one sport. He also created the sport to involve more students, especially those who were not as athletic. The sport was popularized and later reformed by players and coaches at Millburn High School in New Jersey. The sport became so popular in the Millburn area that it became an official gym class elective any student could take. Today, it is played in many American high school physical education classes. The sport is still struggling to turn into an actual sport played by club and high school teams.

== Rules ==
=== Objective ===
The main objective of speedball is the objective of soccer/futbol. There are two goals, each guarded by the opposite team members or a goalie. Each team attempts to throw the ball into the goal. However, unlike soccer, there are multiple ways goals can be scored. Goals can be scored by kicking the ball into the net or through goal-line markers with one's feet or throwing the ball into the goal. "Kicks" into the soccer goal are worth three points while "throws" are only worth one and shots made into the basket are two. The team that scores the most points by the end of the match wins the game. In speedball leagues, whether they are at school or for a local speedball team, wins are worth three points, ties are worth one point and a loss is worth none.

=== The field and the ball ===
The field can be any number of sizes and locations but the earliest variants were generally played on a basketball court or on a soccer field. The size of the goal should be about 6 ft wide by 2.5 ft tall. However, different sizes and types of goals can be used; the larger the goals, the faster the game generally goes. Hockey goals are also commonly used. A soccer ball, football, rugby ball, or volleyball may be used.

=== Teams ===
Player positions include;

- Goal Keeper (GK) - Guards the goal - tries to block the ball from going inside the goal
- Center (C) - Moves with the ball - can play offense or defense
- Right Winger (RW) - Plays in the upper right corner of the court/field - crosses the ball into the center
- Left Winger (LW) - Plays in the upper left corner or the court/field - crosses the ball into the center
- Defensive Back (DB) Plays defense - tries to gain possession of the ball

=== Gameplay ===
The game starts by having a jump ball or coin toss in the center of the court/field, the players are allowed to move anywhere on the court/field of game play. Players may only touch the ball with their hands/arms after the ball touches something that is not the ground. One may not pick up the ball from the ground or if the ball bounced from the ground without touching another body part first (feet, thigh.) A player may use their feet to get the ball in the air to carry it around.

If a player does touch the ball with their arms illegally, then it is considered a handball penalty and will result in the ball being turned over to the other team's goalie. If the player has the ball in their hands, they must make every effort to stop moving as fast as possible (if one keeps moving it is considered a travel and the ball will be turned over to the other team's goalie). Once a player has a ball in their possession, they can pass it off, attempt to score, or drop the ball in order to utilize other parts of the body to move the ball. Goalies must stay on their side of the court and can't cross the half line (can't cross half court line). Goalies can touch the ball with any part of their body, meaning that they can pick up the ball off the ground without it being considered an "illegal" move. It is still illegal for goalies to travel with the ball in their hands; however, they can dribble the ball. A player may use their feet to get the ball in the air to carry it.

=== Penalties and fouls ===
A penalty is when a foul is committed inside the goal box and the other team gets to take a penalty kick. A foul, committed anywhere except in the box, results in a free kick for the player fouled. If the ball goes outside and is no longer in bounds the last player to touch it must give the ball to the other team. The team receiving the ball can throw it in like a throw-in for basketball. Unlike soccer, there are no yellow cards in Speedball. Any player who commits an unnecessary foul receives a red card. Unlike soccer, a single red card does not mean the player is kicked from the game. The player receiving the card must sit in a penalty box and must stay out for at least five minutes. Three red cards for a single player means a player is kicked from the match.

- Handball — if a player touches the ball with his/her hands after it touches the ground
- Traveling — when a player takes steps after coming to a complete stop while the ball is in the player's hands
- Unsportsmanlike Conduct — viciously assaulting another player with no intention of going after the ball
- Goalies Passing The Half Line — when a goalie moves over the half line
