= Ted Kershner =

American football player and coach (born 1938)

Biographical details
- Born: May 27, 1938 (age 88)

Coaching career (HC unless noted)
- 1981–1987: Glassboro State

Head coaching record
- Overall: 35–34

Accomplishments and honors

Championships
- 1 NJSAC (1983)

Ted Kershner (born May 27, 1938) is an American former football player and coach. He served as the head coach at Glassboro State College (now called Rowan University), an NCAA Division III program in Glassboro, New Jersey. He was the fourth all-time coach for the Profs and compiled a 35–34 record in seven seasons. In 1983, the Profs were New Jersey State Athletic Conference co-champions with Trenton State College. Kershner coached Rowan football for 20 years as an assistant and head coach. He also taught at Rowan.

He attended Ursinus College, from which he graduated in 1960 with a bachelor's degree in physical education. He played quarterback and defensive back for four years at Ursinus. Kershner earned a master's degree from Temple University in 1966.

He currently resides in Woodstown.

== Head coaching record ==
Year	Team	Overall	Conference	Standing	Bowl/playoffs
Glassboro State Profs (New Jersey State Athletic Conference) (1981–1987)
1981	Glassboro State	5–5	4–2	3rd	
1982	Glassboro State	5–5	3–3	T–3rd	
1983	Glassboro State	5–5	5–1	T–1st	
1984	Glassboro State	4–5	4–2	2nd	
1985	Glassboro State	5–5	4–2	T–2nd	
1986	Glassboro State	5–5	4–2	2nd	
1987	Glassboro State	6–4	4–2	3rd	
Glassboro State:		35–34	28–14		
Total:		35–34			
National championship Conference title Conference division title or championship game berth
