= Alfred Alspach =

Pennsylvania representative (1912–2002)

- Born: Alfred Charles Alspach; February 9, 1912; Chambersburg, Pennsylvania
- Died: September 19, 2002 (aged 90); Lancaster, Pennsylvania
- Occupation: Attorney
- Known for: Pennsylvania House of Representatives; Boys & Girls Club of Lancaster; Lancaster County District Attorney

Alfred Charles Alspach, Sr. (February 9, 1912 – September 19, 2002) was a member of the Pennsylvania House of Representatives. He was also one of the founders of the Boys & Girls Club of Lancaster, which started in June 1939. He was the first secretary (1939-1976) and later served as its president and chairman of the board. He also served with the Boys & Girls Club Foundation. He has received national recognition from the organization: the Boys & Girls Club Medallion, Life Member, and the Silver Medallion. In April 2000 the Boys & Girls Club renamed the former Lancaster Community Center located at Rockland Street to be the Alfred C. Alspach Community Center.

== Activities ==
He helped form and was the president of the Lancaster City Housing Authority from August 16, 1942, through April 5, 1960.

Alspach was active in Republican politics all his life. He served as the State Representative for the City of Lancaster from 1939 to 1945, and was the youngest representative at the time. He served as an assistant district attorney from 1952, and served as the District Attorney of Lancaster County from 1960 to 1964. In his years as a district attorney, he successfully promoted legislation which created the prison work release program in Pennsylvania. In 1992, he went to the Republican National Convention as an alternate delegate.

Alspach has been active in the various branches of the Scottish Rite Masonic fraternity all his adult life. He was a member of the symbolic Lodge No. 43 F&AM, Lancaster Lodge of Perfection, Royal Arch Chapter, Knights Templar, Royal and Select Masters Knights and Harrisburg Consistory A. A. S. R. He has received the Meritorious Service Award and was a 50-plus-year member of the craft.

Alspach was an "almost charter" member of the Lancaster Chapter American Business Club with over 50 years' membership, and he has served as its president.

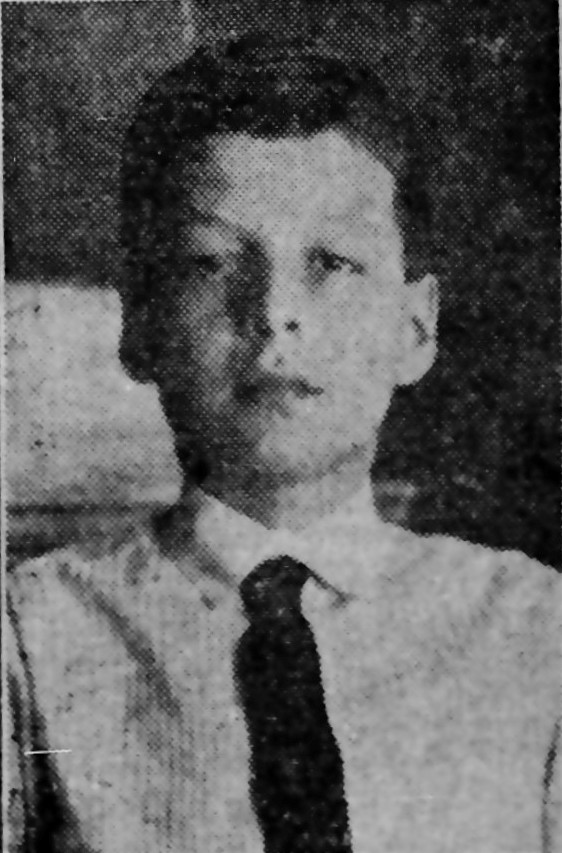
Alfred Alspach circa 1925

== Early life ==
Alfred C. Alspach was born February 9, 1912, in Chambersburg, Pennsylvania, the son of Titus Alfred Alspach and Charlotte Davidson Alspach. He skipped two grades and graduated as valedictorian from Boys High School in Lancaster City at age 15. According to local newspaper accounts, he twice won the $20.00 gold piece award in the annual city-wide debate contests.

He attended Ursinus College and graduated with honors in 1933. He graduated from the University of Pennsylvania Law School in 1936. He was Lt. Commander (Ret.) in the United States Naval Reserve and served during World War II, serving as a legal officer in the Office of Inspector of Naval Material in Atlanta, GA.

== See also ==
- Pennsylvania House of Representatives
- List of Pennsylvania state legislatures
