= USA Field Hockey =

American national governing body for field hockey

- Sport: Field hockey
- Jurisdiction: United States
- Founded: 1922
- Affiliation: FIH
- Regional affiliation: PAHF
- Headquarters: Colorado Springs, Colorado, U.S.
- Chairperson: Chip Rogers
- CEO: Simon Hoskins
- Men's coach: Allan Law
- Women's coach: David Passmore
- Sponsor: STX, Citi, Harrow Sports, Orthopedic Associates of Lancaster, Spooky Nook Sports

Official website
- www.usafieldhockey.com
- (United States)

USA Field Hockey is the national governing body for field hockey in the United States. USA Field Hockey is a member organization of the United States Olympic Committee and the International Hockey Federation. The USA Field Hockey Association is headquartered in Colorado Springs, Colorado. It was founded in 1922.

The organization is responsible for the U.S. Men's and Women's National Field Hockey Teams.

== History ==
The United States Field Hockey Association (USFHA) was founded in 1922, to govern women's field hockey in the United States. Six years later, in 1928, the Field Hockey Association of America (FHAA) was founded, to govern men's field hockey in the U.S.

In April 1993, the USFHA and FHAA merged, to form the United States Field Hockey Association (USFHA).

== National Training Center ==
USWNT – UNC-Charlotte, Charlotte, N.C.
USMNT – UNC-Charlotte, Charlotte, N.C.

== Olympic Games ==
Los Angeles 1932 Olympic Games

1932 U.S. Men's Olympic Games Team – Bronze Medal Winners

Not in Order: Head Coach William Boddington, Harold Brewster, Roy Coffin, Amos Deacon, Horace Disston, Samuel Ewing, James Gentle, Henry Greer, Lawrence Knapp, David McMullin, Leonard O'Brien, Charles Sheaffer, Frederick Wolters

Berlin 1936 Olympic Games

1936 U.S. Men's Olympic Games Team

Not in Order: Head Coach Frank Kavanaugh, Playing Manager Leonard O'Brien, William Boddington, Lanphear Buck, Amos Deacon, Horace Disston, Samuel Ewing, Paul Fentress, James Gentle, Ellwood Godfrey, Lawrence Knapp, David McMullin, Charles Sheaffer, Alexis Thompson, John Turnbull

London 1948 Olympic Games

1948 U.S. Men's Olympic Games Team

Not in Order: Donald Buck, David Cauffman, Claus Gerson, Henry Goode, Frederic Hewitt, William Kutz, Henrik Lubbers, Harry Marcoplos, Kurt Orban, John Renwick, Philip Schoettle, Sanders Sims, John Slade, Walter Stude, Alexis Thompson, Felix Ucko, William Wilson

Melbourne 1956 Olympic Games

1956 U.S. Men's Olympic Games Team

L to R: John Greer, Kurt Orban, Hidde Leegstra, Ray Wittelsberger, Bob Shans, Larry Marcoplos, Herman Van Nouhuys, Kurt Ucko, John Rote, Bill Stude, Hank Clifford, Gerry Kruize, Felix Ucko, Jim Jongeneel, Stan Harris, Newbold Black

Moscow 1980 Olympic Games

1980 U.S. Women's Olympic Games Team

Not in Order: Head Coach Vonnie Gros, Assistant Coach Will van Beaumont, Julie Staver, Beth Anders, Jill Grant, Chris Larson, Denise Desautels, Diane Moyer, Beth Beglin, Char Morett, Leslie Milne, Gwen Cheeseman, Sheryl Johnson, Sue Marcellus, Karen Shelton, Anita Miller, Nancy White, Judy Strong

Los Angeles 1984 Olympic Games

1984 U.S. Men's Olympic Games Team

Not in Order: Manager Lee Yoder, Mohammad Barakat, Ken Barrett, Rawle Cox, Trevor Fernandes, Robert Gregg, Manzar Iqbal (c), Michael Kraus, Randy Lipscher (GK), David McMichael, Gary Newton, Michael Newton, Brian Spencer, Morgan Stebbins, Robert Stiles (GK), Andrew Stone, Nigel Traverso

1984 U.S. Women's Olympic Games Team – Bronze Medal Winners

L to R: Karen McGahey, Sheryl Johnson, Judy Strong, Julie Staver, Beth Anders, Chris Larson Mason, Anita Miller-Huntsman and Marcy Place-von Schottenstein. Standing: Marge Garinger, Manager, Gwen Cheeseman Alexander, Karen Shelton, Char Morett, Leslie Milne, Beth Beglin, Brenda Stauffer, Gina Buggy, Diane Moyer, Marge Watson, Assistant Coach, Head Coach Vonnie Gros

Seoul 1988 Olympic Games

1988 U.S. Women's Olympic Games Team

Not in Order: Patty Shea, Yolanda Hightower, Mary Koboldt, Marcia Pankratz, Cheryl Van Kuren, Diane Bracalente, Beth Beglin, Marcella Place, Sandra Vander-Heyden, Tracey Fuchs, Sheryl Johnson, Sandra Costigan, Christy Morgan, Barbara Marois, Megan Donnelly, Donna Lee, Head Coach Boudewijn Castelijn

Atlanta 1996 Olympic Games

1996 U.S. Men's Olympic Games Team

Not in Order: Head Coach Jon Clark, Tom Vano, Steve Danielson, Larry Amar, Marq Mellor, Scott Williams, Steve Jennings, Steven van Randwijck, Mark Wentges, John O'Neill, Eelco Wassenaar, Nick Butcher, Ahmed Elmaghraby, Phil Sykes, Otto Steffers, Ben Maruquin, Steve Wagner (GK)

1996 U.S. Women's Olympic Games Team

Not in Order: Head Coach Pam Hixon, Patty Shea (GK), Laurel Martin, Liz Tchou, Marcia Pankratz, Cindy Werley, Diane Madl, Kris Fillat, Kelli James, Tracey Fuchs, Antoinette Lucas, Katie Kauffman, Andrea Wieland (GK)Leslie Lyness, Barbara Marois, Jill Reeve, Pamela Bustin

Beijing 2008 Olympic Games

2008 U.S. Women's Olympic Games Team

L to R Middle: Kayla Bashore Smedley, Amy Tran Swensen (GK), Keli Smith Puzo, Angela Loy, Rachel Dawson, Carrie Lingo, Dana Sensenig, Dina Rizzo. Front: Kate Barber Kinnear, Lauren Crandall, Katelyn Falgowski, Lauren Powely, Kelly Doton, Tiffany Snow, Jesse Guy Dukes, Caroline Nichols. Head Coach: Lee Bodimeade

London 2012 Olympic Games

L to R Middle: Michelle Vittese, Michelle Kasold, Katelyn Falgowski, Shannon Taylor, Claire Laubach, Rachel Dawson, Keli Smith Puzo, Paige Selenski, Kayla Bashore Smedley, Lauren Crandall, Katie Reinprecht, Julia Reinprecht, Melissa Gonzalez Caroline Nichols, Amy Tran Swensen (GK), Katie O'Donnell Bam. Head Coach: Lee Bodimeade

Rio 2016 Olympic Games

2016 U.S. Women's Olympic Games Team – 5th Place

Katie (O'Donnell) Bam, Lauren Crandall, Rachel Dawson, Katelyn Falgowski, Stefanie Fee, Melissa Gonzalez, Michelle Kasold, Kelsey Kolojejchick, Alyssa Manley, Julia Reinprecht, Katie Reinprecht, Kat Sharkey, Caitlin Van Sickle, Michelle Vittese, Jill Witmer, Jackie (Kintzer) Briggs (GK), Head Coach: Craig Parnham

== See also ==
- United States women's national field hockey team
- United States men's national field hockey team
- NCAA Women's Field Hockey Championship
