= Iverson (surname) =

Iverson is a surname, an anglophonic variant of Iversen. Notable people of this surname include:

- Abraham Iverson, member of the Virginia House of Burgesses
- Alfred Iverson Jr. (1829–1911), American Civil War general
- Alfred Iverson Sr. (1798–1873), American politician
- Allen Iverson (born 1975), American basketball player
- Becky Iverson (born 1967), American professional golfer
- Bob Iverson (1910–1953), English professional footballer
- Brent Iverson, computer programmer
- Carl Iverson (born 1940), American football coach
- Colton Iverson (born 1989), American basketball player for Maccabi Tel Aviv of the Israeli Basketball Premier League
- David R. Iverson (born 1969), United States Air Force
- Dennis Iverson (born 1981), Australian judoka
- Don Iverson (born 1945), American professional golfer
- Donald L. Iverson (1923–1999), American politician
- Emil Iverson (1892–1960), Danish-American ice hockey coach and anthropologist
- Eric G. Iverson, pen-name for author Harry Turtledove, born 1949
- Ernest and Clarence Iverson, American radio personalities
- Ethan Iverson (born 1973), American musician
- F. Kenneth Iverson, American businessman
- Jack Iverson (1915–1973), Australian cricketer
- Jacob J. Iverson (1850–1923), American politician
- Jana Iverson, American developmental psychologist
- Jim Iverson (1930–2020), American basketball player and coach
- Joanne Iverson (born 1939), American rower and coach
- Johnathan Lee Iverson (born 1976), American circus entertainer
- Kay Iverson, Danish-born Canadian ice hockey coach
- Kenneth E. Iverson, Canadian computer scientist, inventor of APL
- Kirk Vernström Iverson, American inventor, writer, producer, media executive, investor and financier
- Khalil Iverson (born 1997), American professional basketball player
- May Iverson, fictional heroine of a series of novels by Elizabeth Jordan
- Melissa Iverson, American rower
- Peter Iverson (1944–2021), Regents Professor of History (Emeritus) at Arizona State University
- Philip Iverson (1965–2006), Canadian artist
- Samuel G. Iverson (1859–1928), American politician
- Sara Iverson, Professor of Biology at Dalhousie University
- Sherrice Iverson (1989–1997), American murder victim
- Stewart Iverson (born 1950), former Republican party member of the Iowa House of Representatives

== See also ==
- Iverson L. Harris (1805–1876), associate justice of the Supreme Court of Georgia
