= Ivarson =

Ivarson may refer to:

== People ==
- Inge Ivarson (1917–2015), Swedish film producer and screenwriter
- Per Ivarson Undi (1803–1860), Norwegian-American homesteader in the Wisconsin Territory

== Other ==
- Ivarson USA LLC, an American manufacturing company

== See also ==
- Iverson (disambiguation)
- Iversen (disambiguation)
