= Donald Hunt =

Donald Hunt may refer to:

- Donald F. Hunt, professor of chemistry and pathology
- Donald Hunt (musician) (1930–2018), English choral conductor
- Donald Hunt (sportswriter), African-American sportswriter
- Donald Hunt, a character in the TV soap opera Coronation Street
- Donald Hunt, a character in the TV series Mission: Impossible
