= Rachel Washburn =

US Army officer and cheerleader (born 1980s)

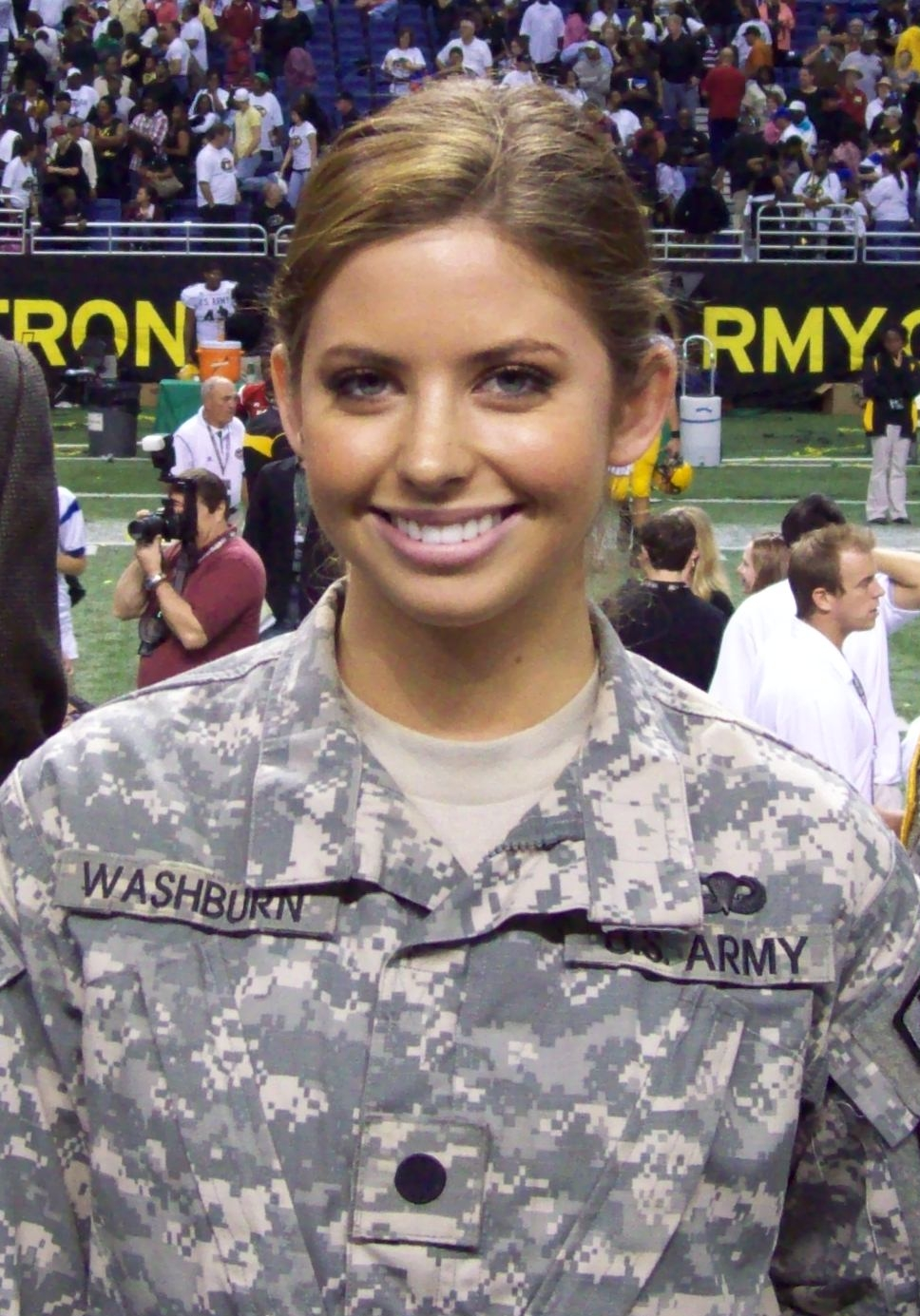
- Cadet Washburn in 2009
- Born: 1987/1988 (age 37–38)
- Education: BA, Drexel U. (2010)
- Occupations: Cheerleader; soldier; analyst
- Employers: Philadelphia Eagles (2007–10); Academy Securities (2017–)
- Military career
- Branch: United States Army
- Years: 2010–2016
- Rank: First lieutenant

Rachel Washburn (born 1987/1988) is a former United States Army officer and former cheerleader for the Philadelphia Eagles.

== Personal life ==
Born in 1987 or 1988, Rachel Washburn is a military brat who moved at least twelve times while her father flew helicopters for the US Army and fighter aircraft for the US Air Force. By 2013, though, she called Philadelphia home. In October 2019, Washburn was married to an active-duty soldier assigned to the United States Army Special Forces.

Advised by her father to accept an Air Force Reserve Officer Training Corps (ROTC) scholarship to Ohio State University, Washburn instead accepted a "lucrative " Army ROTC scholarship to Philadelphia's Drexel University. In autumn 2006, she enrolled at Drexel U. to pursue her Bachelor of Arts in history. Cadet Washburn participated in 2009's Army-sponsored All-American Bowl in San Antonio alongside Secretary of the Army Pete Geren and Sergeant Major of the Army Kenneth Preston.

== Cheerleading ==
With a childhood background in gymnastics, inspired by her friend who cheered for the Philadelphia 76ers, and with an interest in American football, Washburn was accepted by the Philadelphia Eagles Cheerleaders in spring 2007, despite having zero experience in the sport. She worked for the team for three seasons (2007–08, 08–09, and 09–10). As a cheerleader for the Philadelphia Eagles, Washburn joined the team on a goodwill tour of Iraq and Kuwait; this reignited her passion for ROTC and military service.

== US Army ==
Washburn joined the United States Army in 2010. After her commissioning as a second lieutenant, Washburn received paratrooper and intelligence training, and would be primarily tasked with the latter. Prior to her first deployments to Afghanistan, Washburn was trained as a cultural support team (CST) member: a female soldier attached to a special operations unit to liaise with Afghan women. Washburn wore a headscarf when working with local women, and even subbed for a midwife when she helped deliver an Afghan woman's baby. Washburn and other CST members were the first members of the program, and have considered writing a book on the topic.

On her second Afghan deployment (ended 17 November 2013), Washburn led an intelligence platoon. By December 2013, First Lieutenant Washburn was stationed at Fort Stewart and had received a Bronze Star Medal, an Army Commendation Medal, a Combat Action Badge, and an Air Assault Badge. Washburn left the Army in 2016.

== Civilian career ==
After working with a non-governmental relief organization as a regional director, Washburn was hired by the broker-dealer Academy Securities in 2017. In 2018, she co-authored a report, cited by Forbes warning that "Turkey as a NATO ally is no longer a given". As of October 2019, she was still with the veteran-run company. Academy Securities president Phil McConkey said of Washburn, "Rachel leads 13 admirals and generals as a junior officer. She's in charge, and she organizes all these great resources."
