= Philadelphia Sports Hall of Fame =

Nonprofit organization in Philadelphia, Pennsylvania

- Established: May 2002
- Type: Nonprofit Corporation
- Location: 2701 Grant Avenue, Philadelphia, Pennsylvania, 19114, U.S.
- President: Ken Avallon
- Website: www.phillyhall.org

The Philadelphia Sports Hall of Fame is a nonprofit organization in Philadelphia, Pennsylvania that was established in May 2002 to honor individuals and groups who are either area natives who became prominent in the field of sports or who became prominent in the field of sports in the region.

The Hall of Fame's address is 2701 Grant Avenue in Philadelphia.

From 2004 to 2010, the organization also presented an annual Pride of Philadelphia Award to a team or individual.

== Requirements ==
Individuals, Teams, Venues, Events, and Organizations are all eligible. Generally they must have gained national prominence as individuals or venues while attached to the Philadelphia region, or won a championship as a team from the Philadelphia region. Individuals are eligible for induction five years after retirement from a playing career. When an individual dies, he or she becomes immediately eligible.

An individual who was not an athlete may be inducted in the following categories: Legacy of Excellence, Lifetime Commitment, Philadelphia Medal.

== Inductees ==
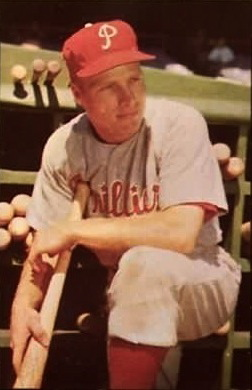
Richie Ashburn, inducted in 2004, longtime player and color commentator for the Philadelphia Phillies

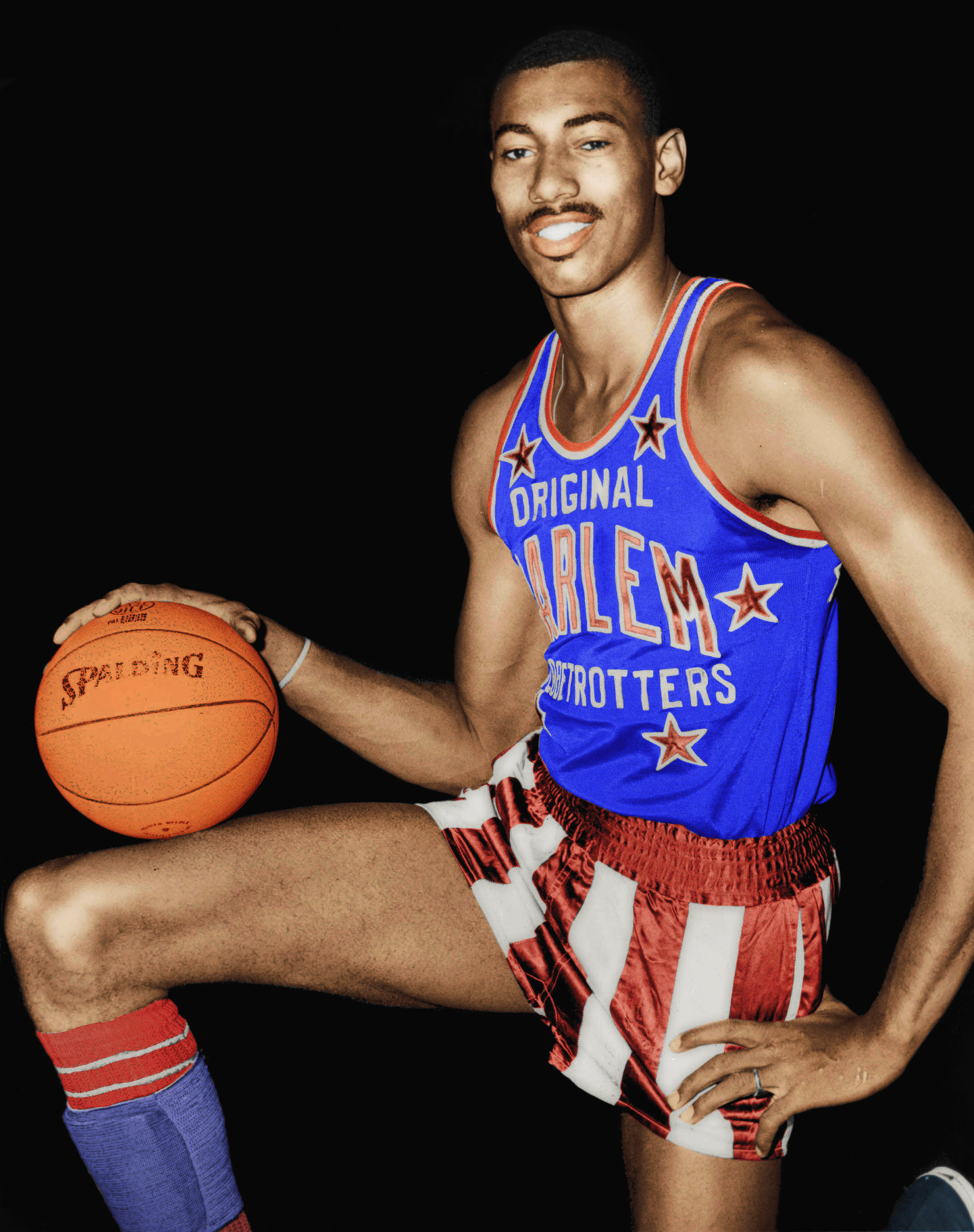
Wilt Chamberlain, an inaugural class inductee, born and raised in Philadelphia and played for the Warriors and Philadelphia 76ers

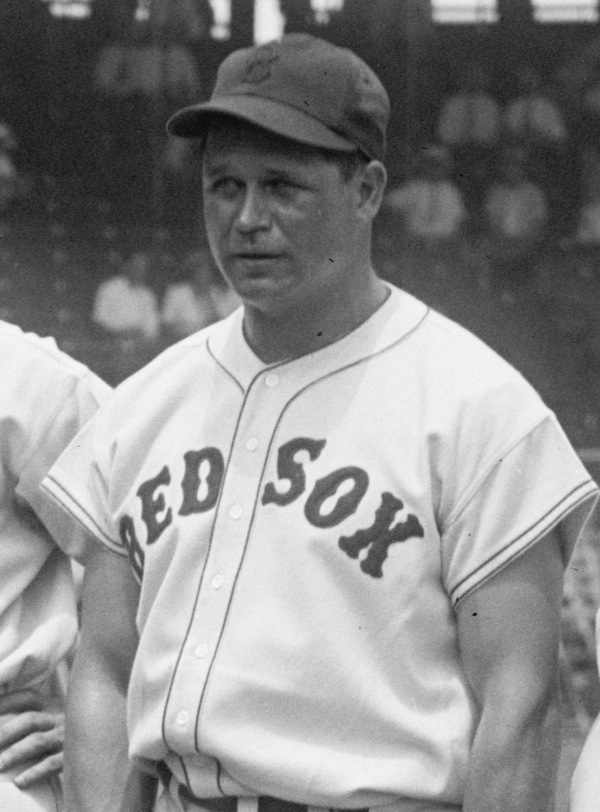
Jimmie Foxx, inducted in 2004, played for the Philadelphia Athletics

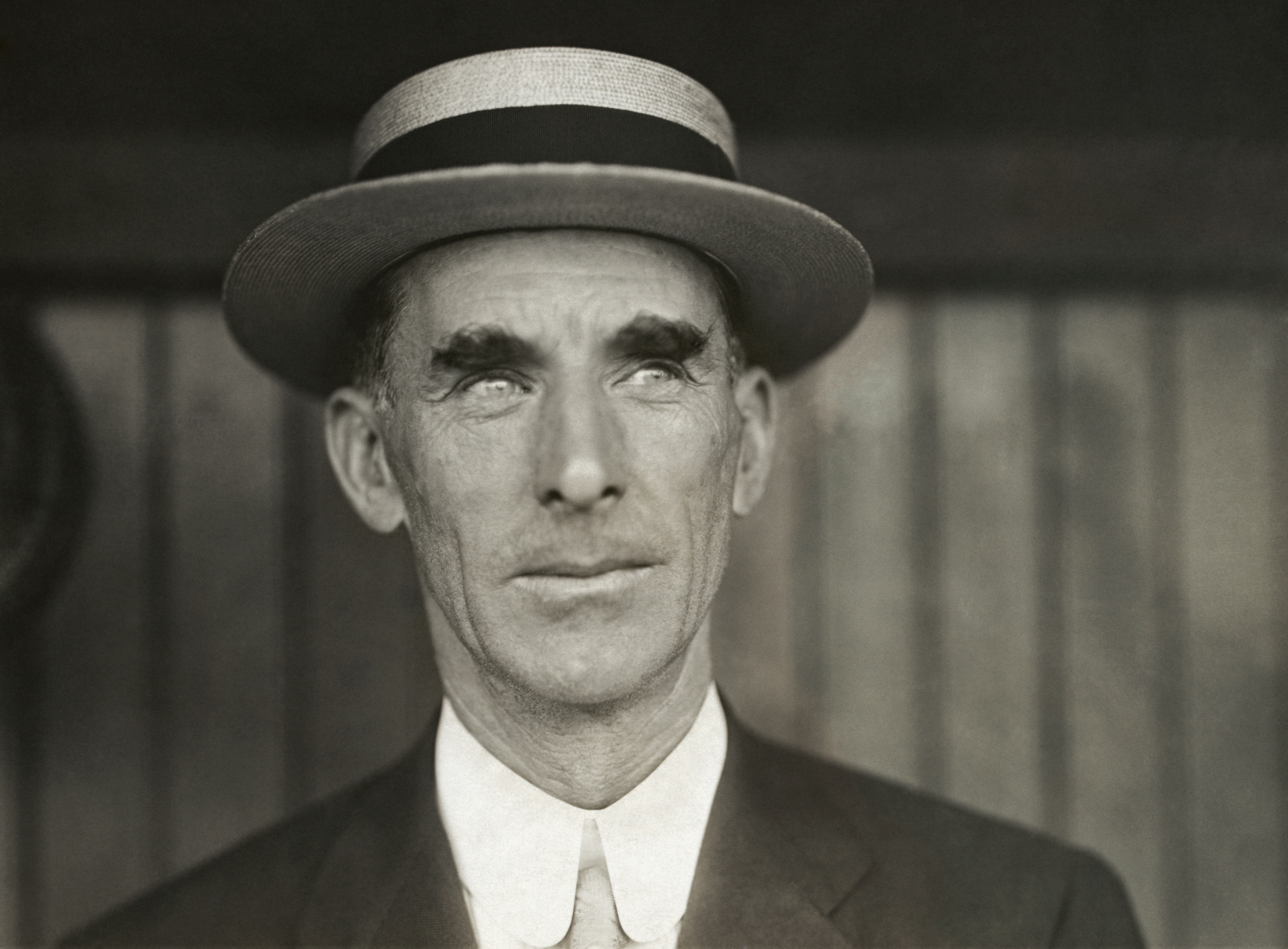
Connie Mack, longtime Manager and Owner of the Philadelphia Athletics was inducted in 2004

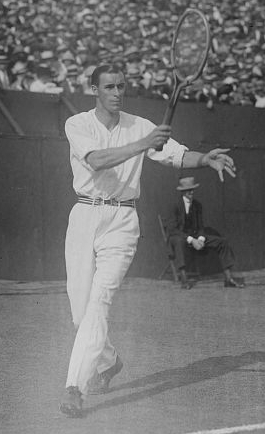
Tennis champion Bill Tilden, inducted in 2004, was born and raised in the Philadelphia area

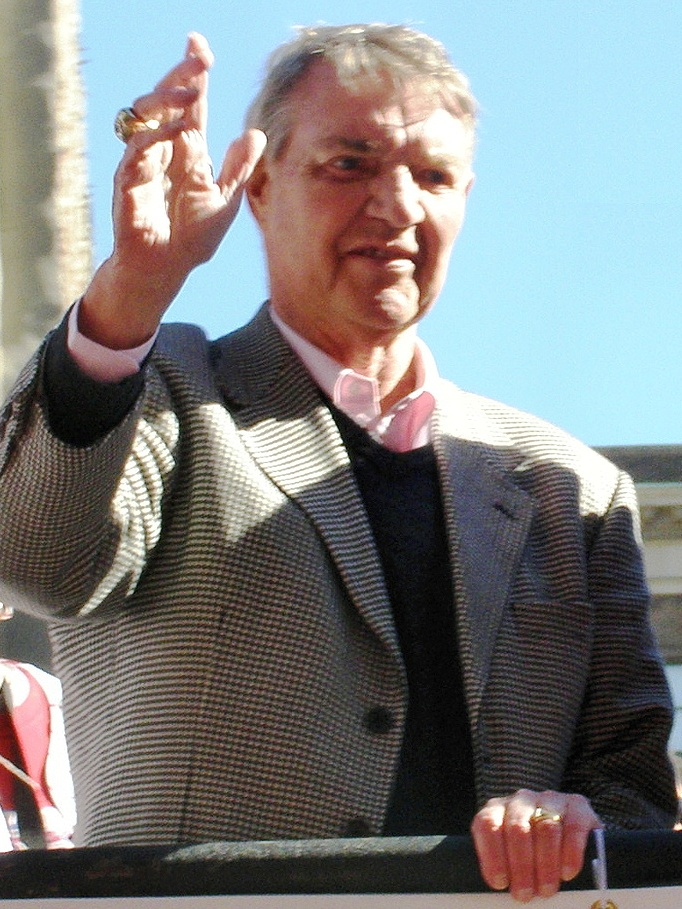
Harry Kalas, longtime Phillies broadcaster, a 2004 Legacy of Excellence inductee

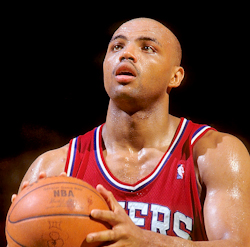
Charles Barkley, inducted in 2005, played for the Philadelphia 76ers from 1984 to 1992

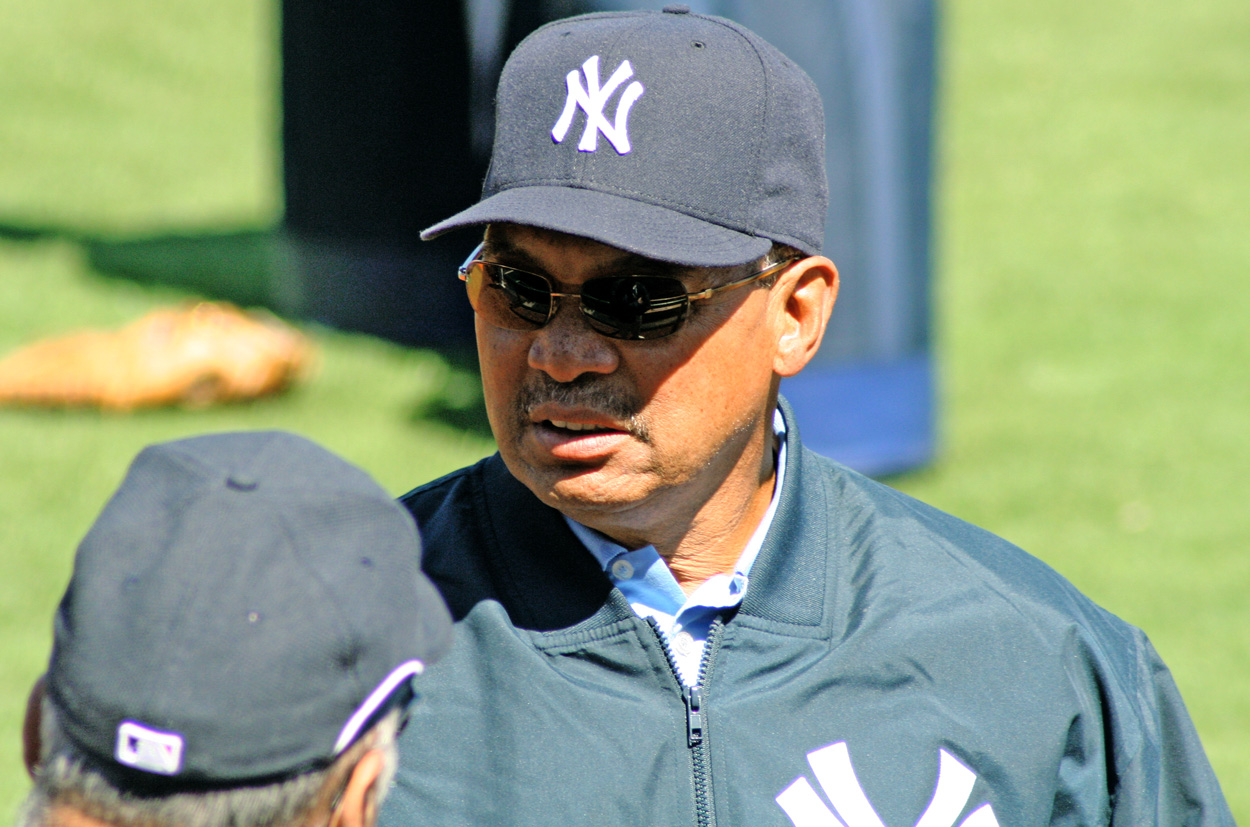
Reggie Jackson, a 2006 inductee, was born and raised in the Philadelphia area

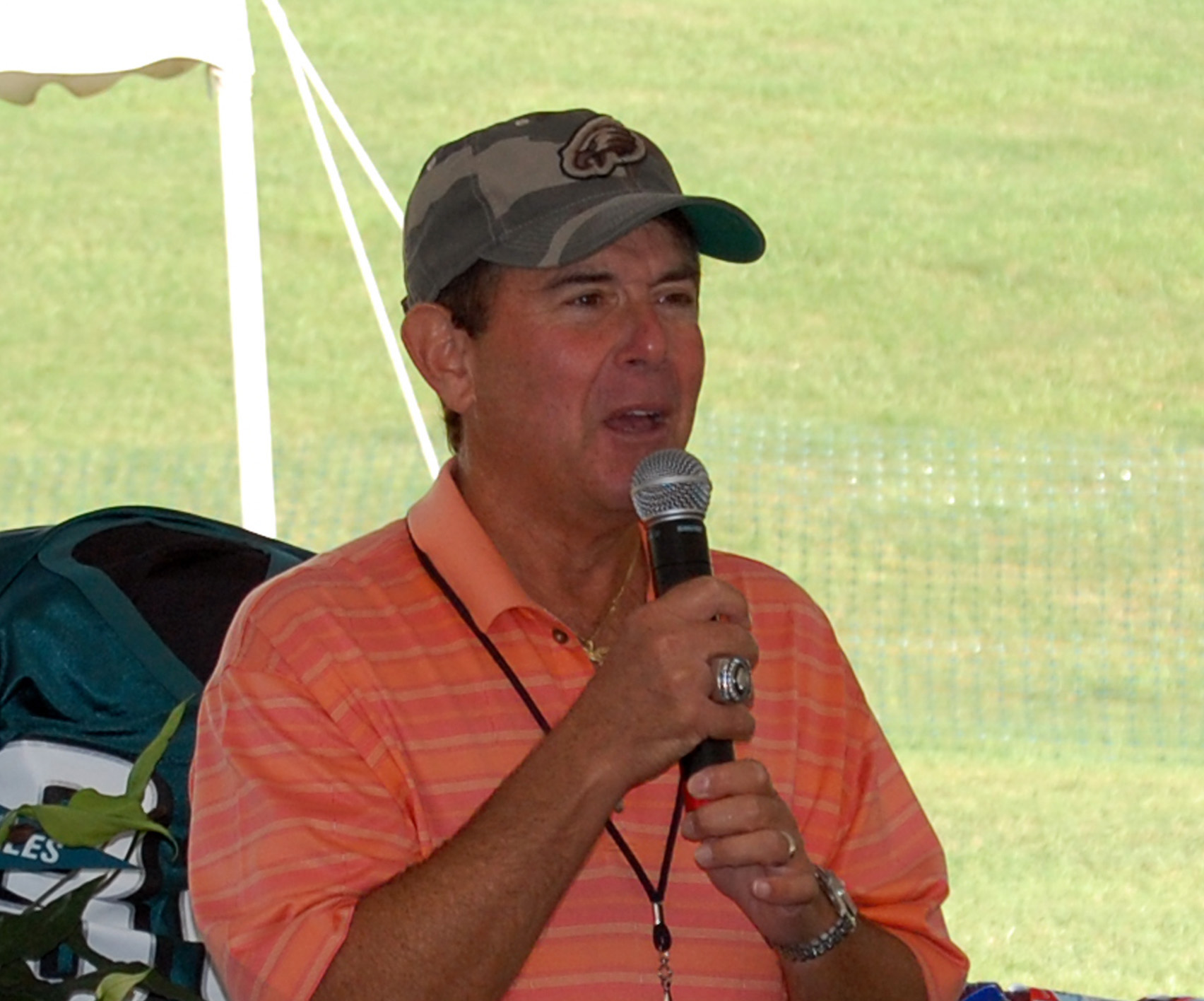
Merrill Reese, inducted in 2009, long time radio broadcaster for the Philadelphia Eagles

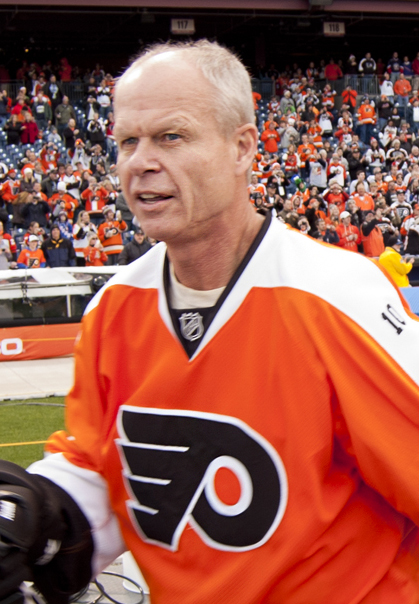
Mark Howe, inducted in 2011, played for the Philadelphia Flyers

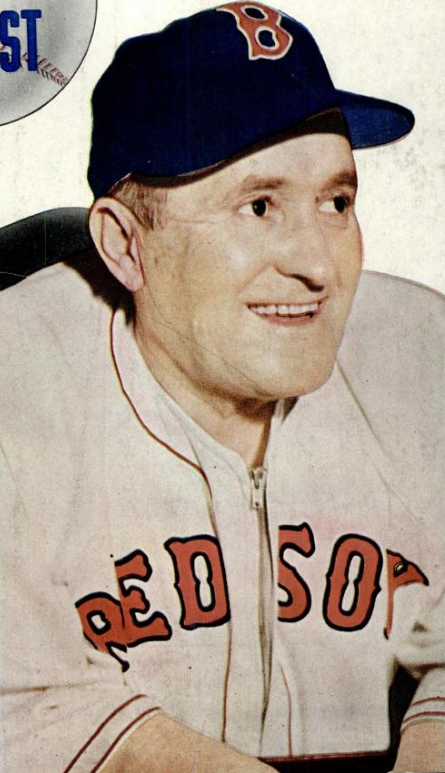
Joe McCarthy, inducted in 2011, born and raised in the Philadelphia area

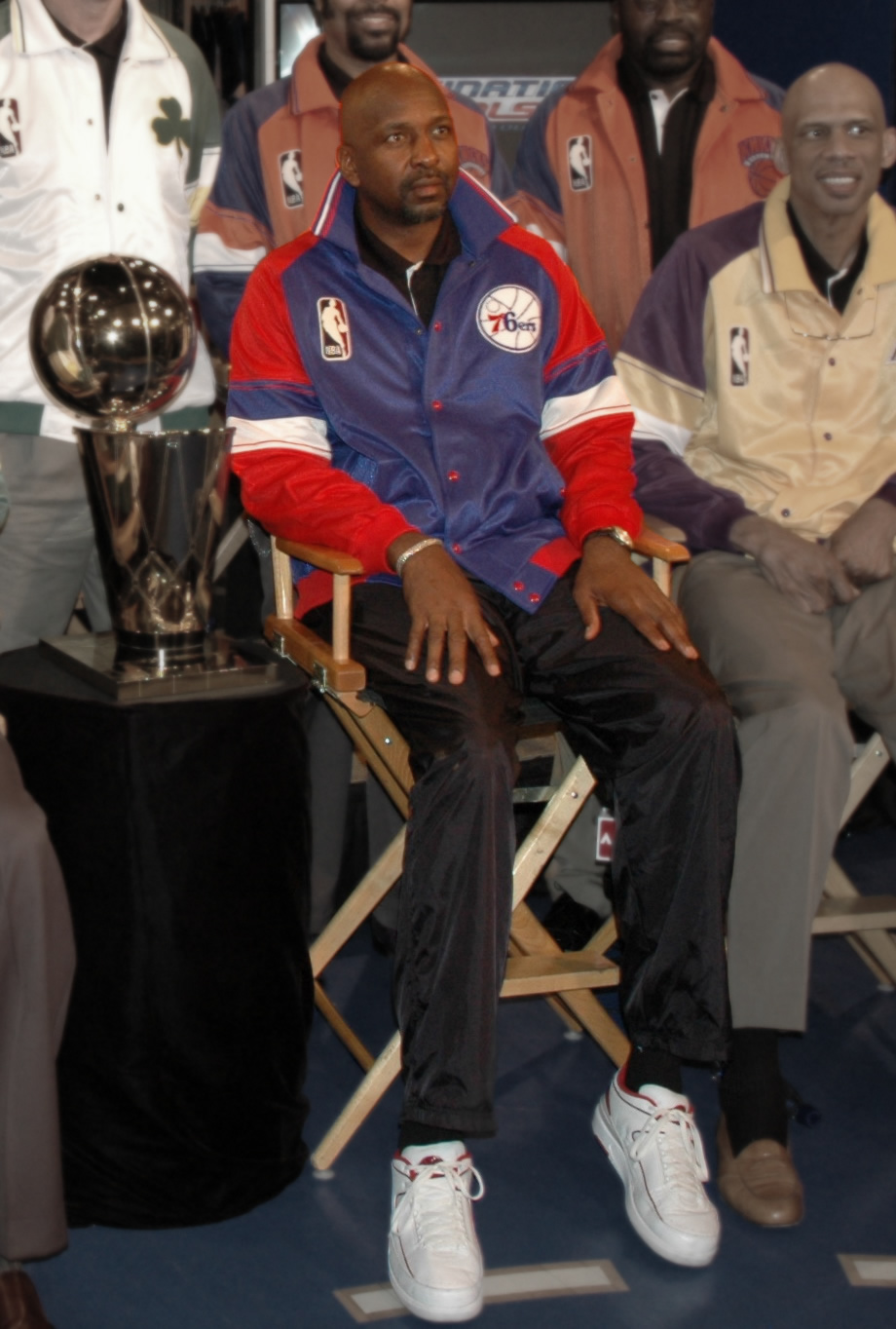
Moses Malone, played for the 76ers

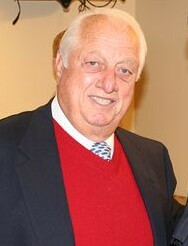
Tommy Lasorda, born and raised in Philadelphia area

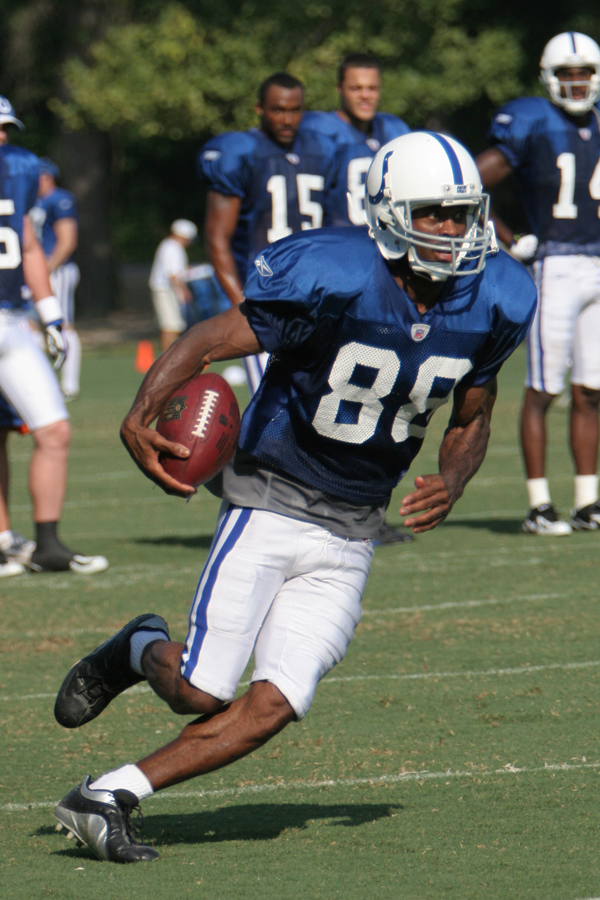
Marvin Harrison, born and raised in Philadelphia area

=== Key ===
Inducted	The year the person was inducted into the Hall.
Person	The person's name.
Sport	The sport the person was inducted in.
Organization	The organization(s) that connect the person to the Philadelphia area.
Reference	

Inducted	Person	Sport	Organization
2004	Paul Arizin	Basketball	Local, La Salle College High School, Villanova University, Philadelphia Warriors
2004	Richie Ashburn	Baseball	Philadelphia Phillies player and broadcaster
2004	Chuck Bednarik	Football	University of Pennsylvania, Philadelphia Eagles
2004	Bert Bell	Football	Local, Liberty High School, University of Pennsylvania, Philadelphia Eagles
2004	Steve Carlton	Baseball	Philadelphia Phillies
2004	Wilt Chamberlain	Basketball	Overbrook High, Philadelphia Warriors, Philadelphia 76ers
2004	Bobby Clarke	Hockey	Philadelphia Flyers
2004	Billy Cunningham	Basketball	Philadelphia 76ers
2004	Julius Erving	Basketball	Philadelphia 76ers
2004	Jimmie Foxx	Baseball	Philadelphia Athletics
2004	Joe Frazier	Boxing	Local
2004	Tom Gola	Basketball	Local, La Salle College High School, La Salle University, Philadelphia Warriors
2004	Sonny Hill	Lifetime Commitment	Local, Philadelphia 76ers, Contributor
2004	Harry Kalas	Legacy of Excellence	Philadelphia Phillies, Broadcaster
2004	John B. Kelly Sr.	Rowing	Local
2004	Connie Mack	Baseball	Philadelphia Athletics Owner/Manager
2004	Bernie Parent	Hockey	Philadelphia Flyers
2004	Robin Roberts	Baseball	Philadelphia Phillies
2004	Mike Schmidt	Baseball	Philadelphia Phillies
2004	Bill Tilden	Tennis	Local, Germantown Academy, University of Pennsylvania
2004	Steve Van Buren	Football	Philadelphia Eagles
2005	1954 La Salle University Men's Basketball	Basketball	NCAA Men's Basketball Champions
2005	Grover Cleveland Alexander	Baseball	Philadelphia Phillies
2005	Charles Barkley	Basketball	Philadelphia 76ers
2005	Bill Campbell	Legacy of Excellence	Broadcaster
2005	John Chaney	Basketball	Local, Cheyney University, Temple University
2005	Jumbo Elliott	Track and field	Local, Villanova University
2005	Eddie Gottlieb	Basketball	Local, SPHAS, Philadelphia Warriors, Philadelphia Stars
2005	Lefty Grove	Baseball	Philadelphia Athletics
2005	Carl Lewis	Track and Field	Local, Willingboro High
2005	Bob Levy	Lifetime Commitment	Contributor, Youth Sports, University of Pennsylvania
2005	Tommy McDonald	Football	Philadelphia Eagles
2005	Pete Pihos	Football	Philadelphia Eagles
2005	Harvey Pollack	Legacy of Excellence	Stat-Man Extraodinaire
2005	Guy Rodgers	Basketball	Local, Temple University, Philadelphia Warriors
2005	Cathy Rush	Basketball	Local, Immaculata College
2005	Vic Seixas	Tennis	Local
2005	Jay Sigel	Golf	Local
2005	Ed Snider	Philadelphia Medal	Owner, Sports/Entertainment Industry Leader
2005	Joe Verdeur	Swimming	Local, Northeast Catholic High, La Salle University
2006	1960 Philadelphia Eagles	Football	NFL champions
2006	Herb Adderley	Football	Local
2006	Don Bragg	Track and Field	Local, Villanova University
2006	Roy Campanella	Baseball	Local
2006	Ray Didinger	Legacy of Excellence	Local, Sportswriter, Broadcaster
2006	Bill Ellerbee	Lifetime Commitment	High School Basketball Coach, Teacher, Mentor
2006	Del Ennis	Baseball	Local, Philadelphia Phillies
2006	Joe Fulks	Basketball	Philadelphia Warriors
2006	Hal Greer	Basketball	Philadelphia 76ers
2006	Gene Hart	Legacy of Excellence	Philadelphia Flyers broadcaster
2006	Reggie Jackson	Baseball	Local
2006	Willie Mosconi	Billiards	Local
2006	The Palestra	Venue Enshrinement	Basketball
2006	Jack Ramsay	Basketball	Local, Saint Joseph's University, Philadelphia 76ers
2006	Al Simmons	Baseball	Philadelphia Athletics
2006	Anne Townsend	Field hockey	Local
2006	Helen Sigel Wilson	Golf	Local
2007	1980 Philadelphia Phillies	Baseball	World Series champions
2007	Beth Anders	Field Hockey	Local
2007	Walter Bahr	Soccer	Local
2007	Bill Barber	Hockey	Philadelphia Flyers
2007	Mickey Cochrane	Baseball	Philadelphia Athletics
2007	Chuck Klein	Baseball	Philadelphia Phillies
2007	Bill Lyon	Legacy of Excellence	Sportswriter, Philadelphia Inquirer, Author
2007	Theresa Grentz	Basketball	Local, Immaculata College
2007	Frank Kilroy	Football	Local, Temple University, Philadelphia Eagles
2007	Harry Litwack	Basketball	Local, Temple University
2007	Earl Monroe	Basketball	Local
2007	Greasy Neale	Football	Philadelphia Eagles
2007	Jack Whitaker	Legacy of Excellence	Local, Saint Joseph's University, sportscaster
2007	Reggie White	Football	Philadelphia Eagles
2008	1929 Philadelphia Athletics	Baseball	World Series Champion
2008	Leroy Burrell	Track and Field	Local
2008	Harold Carmichael	Football	Philadelphia Eagles
2008	Maurice Cheeks	Basketball	Philadelphia 76ers
2008	Ed Delahanty	Baseball	Philadelphia Phillies
2008	Stan Hochman	Legacy of Excellence	Sportswriter, Philadelphia Daily News
2008	Charles Jenkins	Track and Field	
2008	Tommy Loughran	Boxing	Local
2008	Herb Magee	Basketball	Local, Philadelphia University
2008	Dorothy Germain Porter	Golf	Local
2008	Fred Shero	Hockey	Philadelphia Flyers
2008	Lionel Simmons	Basketball	Local, La Salle University
2008	Mickey Vernon	Baseball	Local
2008	Al Wistert	Football	Philadelphia Eagles
2009	1974 & 1975 Philadelphia Flyers	Hockey	Two-time Stanley Cup champions
2009	Larry Bowa	Baseball	Philadelphia Phillies
2009	John Cappelletti	Football	Local, Monsignor Bonner High
2009	Eddie Collins	Baseball	Philadelphia Athletics
2009	Bill Conlin	Legacy of Excellence	Sportswriter, Philadelphia Daily News
2009	Joey Giardello	Boxing	Local
2009	Julius "Judy" Johnson	Baseball	Darby Hilldale Club
2009	Neil Johnston	Basketball	Philadelphia Warriors
2009	Tommy Lasorda	Baseball	Local
2009	Merrill Reese	Legacy of Excellence	Philadelphia Eagles broadcaster
2009	Pete Retzlaff	Football	Philadelphia Eagles
2009	Betty Shellenberger	Lacrosse	Local, Agnes Irwin High
2009	Mel Sheppard	Track and Field	Local
2009	Emlen Tunnell	Football	Local, Radnor High
2010	Dick Allen	Baseball	Philadelphia Phillies
2010	Hobey Baker	Hockey	Princeton University
2010	Elizabeth Becker	Swimming & Diving	Olympic Diving Champion
2010	Tom Brookshier	Football	Philadelphia Eagles
2010	Ron Hextall	Hockey	Philadelphia Flyers
2010	William Hyndman III	Golf	Local
2010	Phil Jasner	Legacy of Excellence	Philadelphia Daily News
2010	Bobby Jones	Basketball	Philadelphia 76ers
2010	Leroy Kelly	Football	Local; Simon Gratz High, Cleveland Browns
2010	Lighthouse Boys Club	Lifetime Commitment	Local
2010	Tug McGraw	Baseball	Philadelphia Phillies
2010	Jim Phelan	Basketball	Local; La Salle University, Philadelphia Warriors, Mount St. Mary's University
2010	Mike Quick	Football	Philadelphia Eagles
2010	Bobby Shantz	Baseball	Philadelphia Athletics
2010	Marianne Stanley	Basketball	College basketball
2010	Jersey Joe Walcott	Boxing	Local
2011	Bill Bergey	Football	Philadelphia Eagles
2011	Jimmy Dykes	Baseball	Philadelphia Athletics
2011	Mark Howe	Hockey	Philadelphia Flyers
2011	Biz Mackey	Baseball	Hall of Fame Negro league catcher
2011	Moses Malone	Basketball	Philadelphia 76ers
2011	Joe McCarthy	Baseball	Local, Hall of Fame Manager
2011	Al Meltzer	Legacy of Excellence	Sportscaster
2011	Ted Meredith	Track & field	Local, Gold Medal Winning Track Star
2011	Wilbert Montgomery	Football	Philadelphia Eagles
2011	Speedy Morris	Basketball	La Salle University, Saint Joseph's Preparatory School
2011	Ed and Steve Sabol	Football	Local, NFL Films
2011	Curt Simmons	Baseball	Philadelphia Phillies
2011	Dawn Staley	Basketball	Local, Whitehall High School, Philadelphia Phillies
2011	Ora Washington	Tennis	Local
2011	Penn Relays	Special enshrinement	Legendary Track Meet and Carnival
2012	Dan Baker	Baseball/Football	Philadelphia Phillies/Philadelphia Eagles public address announcer
2012	Debbie Black	Basketball	Local
2012	Doug Collins	Basketball	Philadelphia 76ers
2012	Eddie Plank	Baseball	Philadelphia Athletics
2012	Eric Lindros	Hockey	Philadelphia Flyers
2012	Gertrude Dunn	Baseball, Field Hockey, Lacrosse	Local
2012	Harold Johnson	Boxing	Local
2012	Horace Ashenfelter	Track and Field	Local
2012	Joe Klecko	Football	Local
2012	Johnny Callison	Baseball	Local, Philadelphia Phillies
2012	John McDermott	Golf	Local
2012	Maxie Baughan	Football	Philadelphia Eagles
2012	Mike Piazza	Baseball	Local
2012	Tommy Thompson	Football	Philadelphia Eagles
2012	Wali Jones	Basketball	Local, Philadelphia 76ers
2012	Legacy Youth and Tennis Education	Special Enshrinement	Tennis
2013	Andrew Toney	Basketball	Philadelphia 76ers
2013	Bob Brown	Football	Philadelphia Eagles
2013	Bucky Walters	Baseball	Local, Philadelphia Phillies
2013	Carl Robie	Swimming	Local
2013	Dave Robinson	Football	Local
2013	Eddie George	Football	Local
2013	Ernie Beck	Basketball	Local, Philadelphia Warriors
2013	Geno Auriemma	Basketball	Local
2013	Greg Luzinski	Baseball	Philadelphia Phillies
2013	Joe Burk	Rowing	Local, University of Pennsylvania
2013	Joe Hand, Sr.	Legacy of Excellence	Boxing
2013	John LeClair	Hockey	Philadelphia Flyers
2013	Linda Page	Basketball	Local
2013	Michael Brooks	Basketball	Local
2013	Pat Williams	Legacy of Excellence	Local, Philadelphia 76ers General Manager
2013	Shag Crawford	Baseball	Local
2013	Tina Sloan Green	Lacrosse	Local, Temple University
2014
2014	Bobby Walston	Football	Philadelphia Eagles
2014	Brian Propp	Hockey	Philadelphia Flyers
2014	By Saam	Legacy of Excellence	Broadcaster
2014	Chief Bender	Baseball	Philadelphia Athletics and Phillies
2014	Chet Walker	Basketball	Philadelphia 76ers
2014	Curt Schilling	Baseball	Philadelphia Phillies
2014	Ellie Daniel	Swimming	Local
2014	Eric Allen	Football	Philadelphia Eagles
2014	Frank Dolson	Legacy of Excellence	Philadelphia Inquirer sports writer
2014	Geoff Petrie	Basketball	Local
2014	Herb Pennock	Baseball	Local, Philadelphia Athletics
2014	Jean Shiley	Track & field	Local
2014	Marvin Harrison	Football	Local
2014	Meldrick Taylor	Boxing	Local
2014	Mike Richter	Hockey	Local
2014	Paul Costello	Rowing	Local
2014	1972–1974 Immaculata University Basketball	Special Enshrinment	"The Mighty Macs", National Champions
2015
2015	Sam Thompson	Baseball	Philadelphia Phillies
2015	Garry Maddox	Baseball	Philadelphia Phillies
2015	Walt Hazzard	Basketball	Local
2015	Dick Vermeil	Football	Philadelphia Eagles
2015	Timmy Brown	Football	Philadelphia Eagles
2015	Rich Gannon	Football	Local
2015	Lou Nolan	Hockey	Flyers PA Announcer
2015	Rick MacLeish	Hockey	Philadelphia Flyers
2015	Benny McLaughlin	Soccer	Local
2015	Karen Shelton	Field Hockey	Local
2015	R. Norris Williams	Tennis	Local
2015	Bob Montgomery	Boxing	Local
2015	Cindy Timchal	Lacrosse	Local
2015	Dave Zinkoff	Legacy of Excellence	76ers and Warriors PA Announcer
2015	Billy Markward	Lifetime Commitment	Local
2016
2016	Chris Short	Baseball	Philadelphia Phillies
2016	Charlie Manuel	Baseball	Philadelphia Phillies
2016	Goose Goslin	Baseball	Local
2016	Al Severance	Basketball	Villanova Wildcats
2016	Marilyn Stephens	Basketball	Local
2016	Brian Dawkins	Football	Philadelphia Eagles
2016	Jimmy Watson	Hockey	Philadelphia Flyers
2016	George Orton	Track and Field	Local
2016	Vonnie Gros	Field Hockey	Local, West Chester University
2016	Bruce Harlan	Swimming/Diving	Local
2016	Jeff Chandler	Boxing	Local
2016	Sylvia Wene Martin	Bowling	Local
2016	Steve Fredericks	Legacy of Excellence	Sports talk radio
2016	Hermann Taylor	Legacy of Excellence	Boxing promoter
2016	Dick Weiss	Legacy of Excellence	Sportswriter
2016	1967 Philadelphia 76ers	Special Enshrinement	1967 NBA Champions
2017
2017	Granny Hamner	Baseball	Philadelphia Phillies
2017	Bob Johnson	Baseball	Philadelphia Athletics
2017	Bob Boone	Baseball	Philadelphia Phillies
2017	Rene Portland	Basketball	
2017	Ray Scott	Basketball	
2017	Mike Bantom	Basketball	
2017	Randall Cunningham	Football	
2017	Ron Jaworski	Football	
2017	Tim Kerr	Hockey	
2017	Irene Guest	Swimming/Diving	
2017	Philadelphia Jack O'Brien	Boxing	
2017	John B. Kelly Jr.	Rowing	
2017	Donald Hunt	Legacy of Excellence	
2017	Andrea Kremer	Legacy of Excellence	
2017	The Army-Navy Game	Special Enshrinement	
2018
2018	1948-49 Philadelphia Eagles	American Football	
2018	Allen Iverson	Basketball	
2018	Benny Bass	Boxing	
2018	Billy "White Shoes" Johnson	American Football	
2018	Brian Westbrook	American Football	
2018	Danny Murtaugh	Baseball	
2018	David Berkoff	Swimming/Diving	
2018	Donald Lippincott	Track and Field	
2018	Gavvy Cravath	Baseball	
2018	Jamie Moyer	Baseball	
2018	Joanne Iverson	Rowing	
2018	Louis Santop	Baseball	
2018	Muffet McGraw	Basketball	
2018	Reggie Leach	Hockey	
2018	Claire Smith	Legacy of Excellence	
2018	Mel Greenberg	Legacy of Excellence	
2019
2019	Al Cantello	Track and Field	
2019	Bill Melchionni	Basketball	
2019	Charlene Morett	Field Hockey	
2019	Clara Schroth-Lomady	Gymnastics	
2019	Donovan McNabb	American Football	
2019	Eric Desjardins	Hockey	
2019	Fran Dunphy	Basketball	
2019	Frank "Home Run" Baker	Baseball	
2019	Matthew Saad Muhammad	Boxing	
2019	Mike Scioscia	Baseball	
2019	Paul Owens	Baseball	
2019	Rasheed Wallace	Basketball	
2019	Troy Vincent	American Football	
2019	Suzy Kolber	Legacy of Excellence	
2019	Jayson Stark	Legacy of Excellence	
2020
2020	1910-13 Philadelphia Athletics	Baseball	
2020	Bo Ryan	Basketball	
2020	Bob Rigby	Soccer	
2020	Cy Williams	Baseball	
2020	Deron Cherry	Football	
2020	Earl Strom	Basketball	
2020	Herman Frazier	Track & Field	
2020	Jerry Sisemore	Football	
2020	Kobe Bryant	Basketball	
2020	Lisa Raymond	Tennis	
2020	Rick Tocchet	Hockey	
2020	Tim Witherspoon	Boxing	
2020	Vic Sears	Football	
2020	David Montgomery	Legacy of Excellence	
2020	J Russell Peltz	Legacy of Excellence	
2020	Ken Hamilton	Lifetime Commitment	
2021
2021	1947 Philadelphia Warriors	Basketball	
2021	Bill Bradley	Football	
2021	Bonnie Rosen	Lacrosse	
2021	Dallas Green	Baseball	
2021	Jim Katcavage	Football	
2021	"Kid" Keinath	Football	
2021	Larry Foust	Basketball	
2021	Lew Tendler	Boxing	
2021	Mark Recchi	Hockey	
2021	Mike Teti	Rowing	
2021	Olga Dorfner	Swimming	
2021	Richard "Rip" Hamilton	Basketball	
2021	Seth Joyner	Football	
2021	Yolanda Laney	Basketball	
2021	Zack Clayton	Basketball/Boxing	
2021	Gary Smith	Legacy of Excellence	
2022
2022	1983 Philadelphia 76ers	Basketball	
2022	Adele Boyd	Field Hockey	
2022	Art McNally	Football	
2022	Charles Cooper	Basketball	
2022	David Akers	Football	
2022	Ed Bolden	Baseball	
2022	Francis “Reds” Bagnell	Football	
2022	Fredia Gibbs	Mixed Martial Arts	
2022	Jimmy Rollins	Baseball	
2022	Keith Allen	Hockey	
2022	Nikki Franke	Fencing	
2022	Phil Martelli	Basketball	
2022	Rollie Massimino	Basketball	
2022	Susan Francia	Rowing	
2022	Howard Eskin	Legacy of Excellence	
2022	Ray Kelly	Legacy of Excellence	
2022	The Legendary Blue Horizon	Venue Enshrinement	
2023
2023	Al Holbert	Motor Sports	
2023	Anthony “Tony” Black	Horse Racing	
2023	Bernard Hopkins	Boxing	
2023	Bill Knecht	Rowing	
2023	Carlos Ruiz	Baseball	
2023	Carol Lewis	Track & Field	
2023	Irving Fryar	Football	
2023	Jay Wright	Basketball	
2023	Jeremiah Trotter	Football	
2023	Joe Watson	Hockey	
2023	Judy Auritt Klein	Swimming	
2023	Truxton Hare	Football	
2023	Valerie Still	Basketball	
2023	Willie Jones	Baseball	
2023	Bill Giles	Legacy of Excellence	
2023	James Isaminger	Legacy of Excellence	
2024
2024	A.W. Tillinghast	Golf	
2024	Alice Putnam Willetts	Field hockey	
2024	Andy Talley	American Football	
2024	Angelo Cataldi	Sports radio	
2024	Brendan Hansen	Swimming	
2024	Chase Utley	Baseball	
2024	Cheryl Reeve	Basketball	
2024	Eddie Stanky	Baseball	
2024	George Benton	Boxing	
2024	Jameer Nelson	Basketball	
2024	Joan Moore	Gymnastics	
2024	Lurline Jones	Basketball	
2024	Paul Westhead	Basketball	
2024	Rod Brind'Amour	Ice hockey	
2024	Ryan Howard	Baseball	
2024	Stan Walters	American football	

== Pride of Philadelphia Award ==
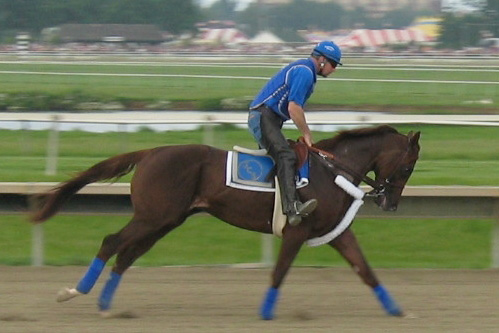
Smarty Jones, a 2004 awardee

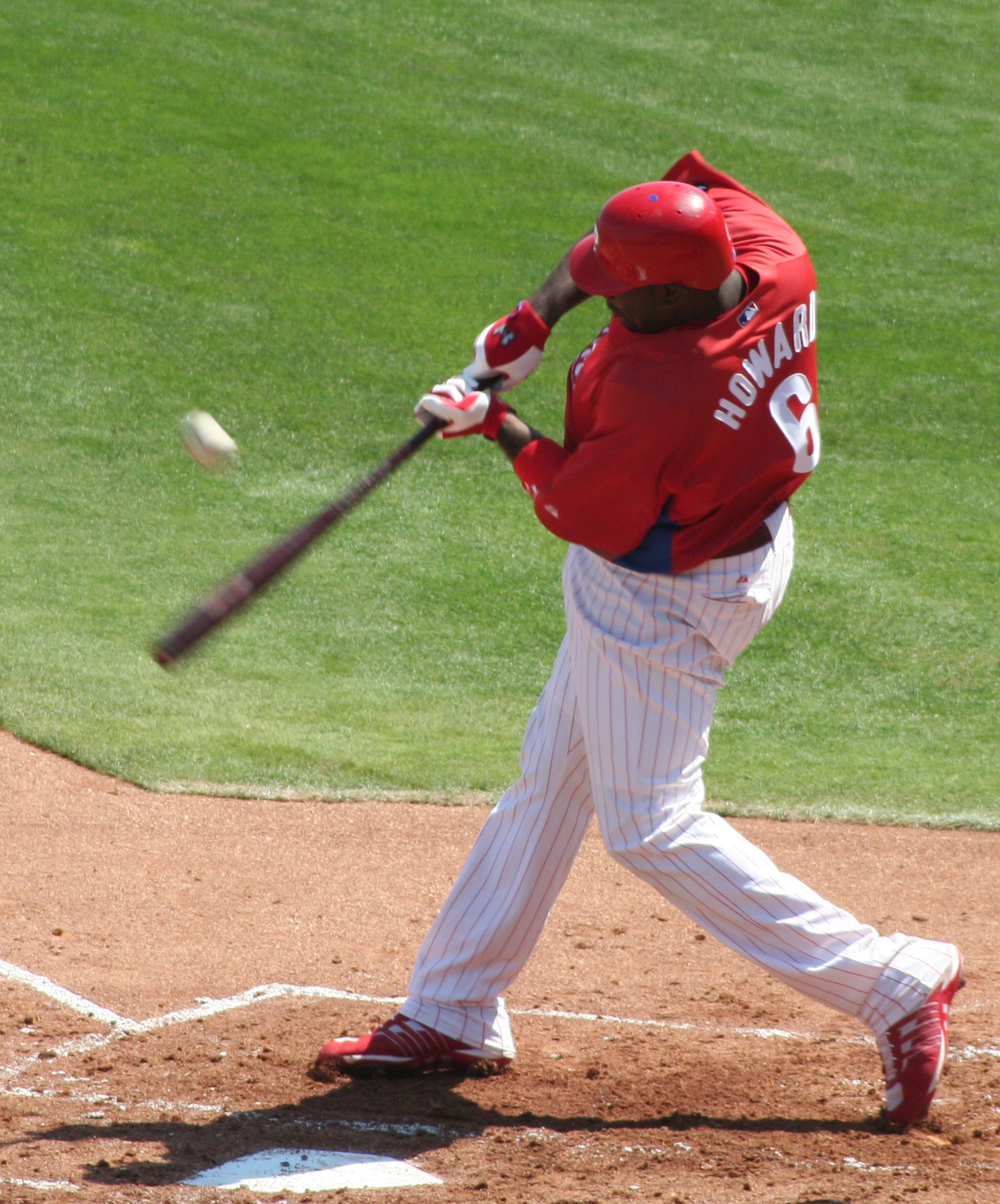
Ryan Howard, a 2006 awardee

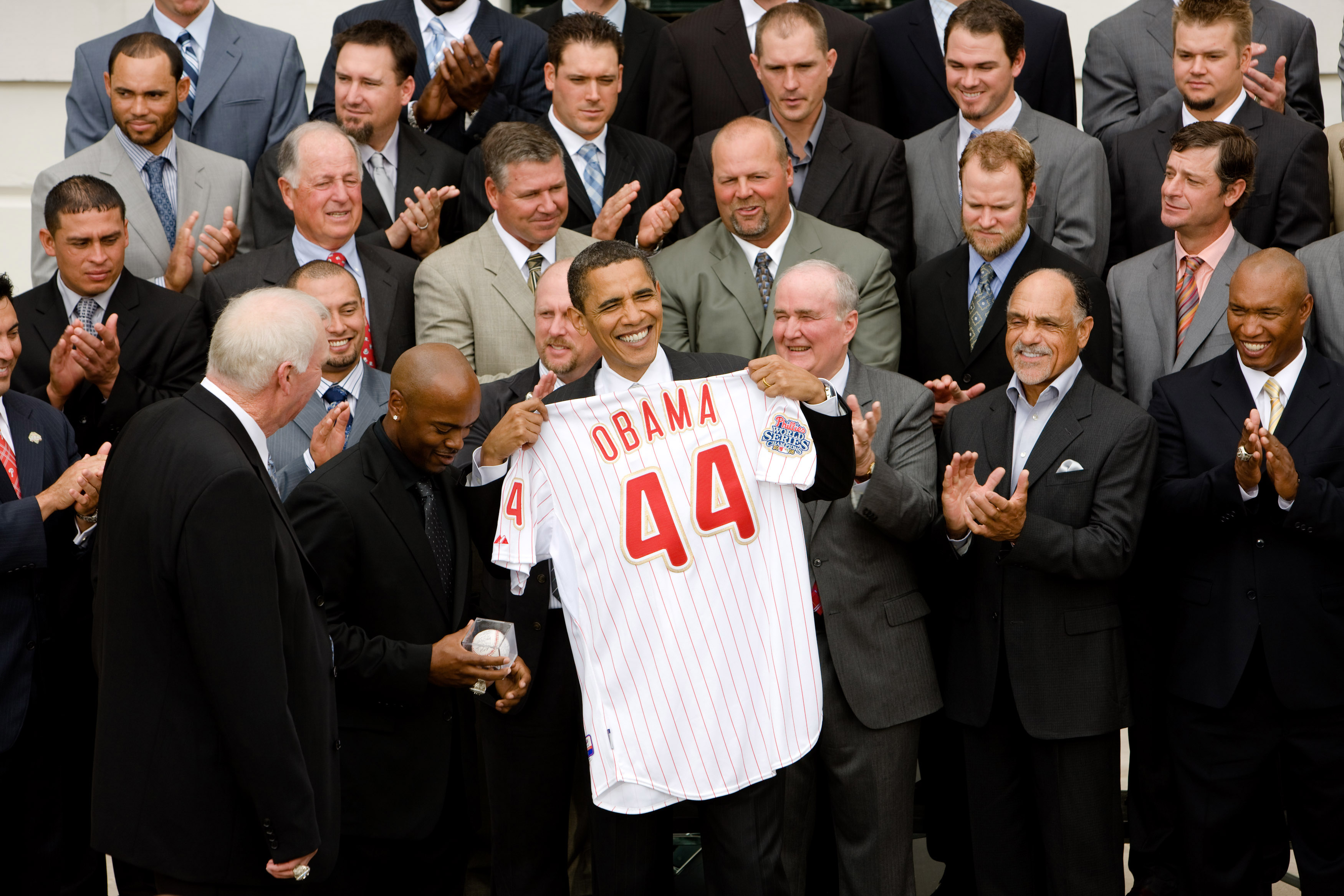
The 2008 Phillies at the White House

The Pride of Philadelphia Award is given to teams or individuals who "represented the Philadelphia area with dignity, determination, and class through athletic achievement."

2004

- Smarty Jones, winner, Kentucky Derby / Preakness Stakes
- Bernard Hopkins, Undisputed middleweight champion
- St. Joseph's Men's Basketball, Atlantic 10 East Division champions

2005

- Afleet Alex, winner, Preakness Stakes / Belmont Stakes
- Philadelphia Phantoms, Calder Cup AHL champions

2006

- Prep Charter Boys' Basketball, PIAA Class AA Basketball Champions
- Villanova Men's Basketball, Big East Regular Season co-champions
- Ryan Howard, NL MVP

2007

- Jimmy Rollins, NL MVP, Gold Glove
- Cheltenham High School Girls' Basketball, PIAA AAAA State Champions

2008

- 2008 Philadelphia Phillies, World Series champions
- Philadelphia Soul, Arena Bowl XXII Champions
- Mount Saint Joseph Academy Girls Basketball, 2008 PIAA AAA State Champions

2009

- Villanova Men's Basketball, 2009 NCAA Final Four
- Archbishop Carroll boys' and girls' basketball teams, PIAA AAA State Champions
- Miguel Cartagena, 2009 Golden Gloves Champion

2010

- Carlos Ruiz, Phillies
- Villanova football, FCS National Champions
- Mark Herzlich, Boston College linebacker

2016

- Villanova Men's Basketball, NCAA Champions

2018

- Villanova Men's Basketball, NCAA Champions
- Philadelphia Eagles, Super Bowl Champions

== Roll Call of Champions ==
The hall of fame's website has a page that honors every Greater Philadelphia team—college and professional—that won the championship in its particular sport.

== Hall of Fame Charities ==
The Foundation formed Hall of Fame Charities in 2004. It supports or has formed partnerships with organizations in the Greater Philadelphia area that promote youth sports, especially at the pre-teen, grade-school level. These organizations include: Richie Ashburn Baseball Foundation, Police Athletic League (PAL) Junior Golf, Arthur Ashe Youth Tennis and Education, Bruce Simon Southampton Summer Basketball Camp, The First Tee of Philadelphia, and Ed Snider Youth Hockey Foundation.

Hall of Fame Charities also has student and community programs.

== See also ==
- Philadelphia Eagles § Philadelphia Sports Hall of Fame
- List of Philadelphia Flyers award winners § Philadelphia Sports Hall of Fame
- List of Philadelphia Phillies award winners and league leaders § Philadelphia Sports Hall of Fame
- Philadelphia 76ers § Philadelphia Sports Hall of Fame
- Pennsylvania Sports Hall of Fame
- Philadelphia Sports Writers Association
- Sports in Philadelphia
