= Barbara Walters' 10 Most Fascinating People =

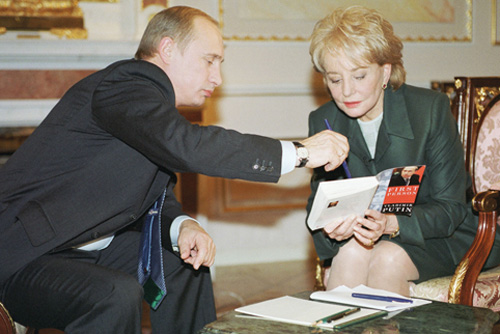
- Walters meeting with Russian president Vladimir Putin in 2001
- Presented by: Barbara Walters
- Country of origin: United States
- No. of episodes: 21

Production
- Running time: 60 minutes to 2 hours (including commercials)
- Production company: ABC News

Original release
- Network: ABC
- Release: 1993 – 2015

Barbara Walters' 10 Most Fascinating People was a televised compilation of ten public figures who are prominent names in the fields of entertainment, sports, politics, and popular culture. Hosted by Barbara Walters, the list was broadcast annually on the second Thursday of December on ABC from 1993 to 2015. Though produced by ABC News, the specials are not presented under the 20/20 banner, the network's flagship newsmagazine.

== History ==
After becoming the first woman to co-anchor an evening network newscast in 1976, Barbara Walters left the ABC Evening News in 1978 to concentrate on The Barbara Walters Specials, an occasional series of interviews with heads of state, newsmakers, sports stars, and other public figures. During the early years of the primetime 'specials', Walters secured the first joint interview with Egypt's President Anwar Sadat and Israel's Prime Minister Menachem Begin. The specials continued to air sporadically throughout the year and saw Walters conduct interviews with a plethora of public and political figures including former British Prime Minister Margaret Thatcher.

In a 1993 special, Walters compiled a list of twelve figures who defined that year. The top person for the year was Hillary Clinton. The program proved popular and led to it returning with ten figures every year except 2000 and 2001. Initially, 2013 was to be Walters' final installment of the special, which happened to end with the same person as in the debut year; however, she continued the program in both 2014 and 2015.

== Format ==
The format of the broadcast consists of ten short-form biographical profiles, often interspersed with a recently recorded interview with the subject. The profiles are introduced by Walters from a set which has a computerized backdrop and she often commentates on why the figure has been chosen to qualify for inclusion in the program.

Similar to other end-of-year annual lists like the Time 100, the ten profiles are not ranked in any order. However, since 2002, Walters has ended each show with her "Most Fascinating Person". In 2007, this honor went to author JK Rowling, who was the only one of the ten not to be interviewed for the show. In 2011, this honor was awarded posthumously to Apple founder Steve Jobs, the only person who was deceased at the time.

== Most Fascinating Persons of the Year ==
- 1993: Hillary Clinton (First Lady)
- 1994: Nelson Mandela
- 1995: Colin Powell
- 1996: Bill Clinton
- 1997: Prince William of Wales (then second in line to the British throne, later first)
- 1998: Bill Clinton
- 1999: Lance Armstrong (Tour de France winner, later revoked)
- 2002: Laura Bush (First Lady)
- 2003: Hillary Clinton (U.S. Senator)
- 2004: Karl Rove (political consultant)
- 2005: Camilla Parker Bowles (The Duchess of Cornwall, later Queen Consort)
- 2006: Nancy Pelosi (Speaker of the United States House of Representatives)
- 2007: J. K. Rowling (author)
- 2008: Barack Obama (President of the United States)
- 2009: Michelle Obama (First Lady)
- 2010: David Petraeus (U.S. Army general)
- 2011: Steve Jobs (Apple Inc. co-founder)
- 2012: David Petraeus (U.S. Army general)
- 2013: Hillary Clinton (former Secretary of State)
- 2014: Amal Clooney (Lawyer, activist, author)
- 2015: Caitlyn Jenner (former Olympian and television personality)

== Most Fascinating People per year ==
=== 1993 ===
- Maya Angelou (author)
- Connie Chung (television host)
- Hillary Clinton (First Lady)
- Barry Diller (media executive)
- Clint Eastwood (actor and film director)
- James Freed (architect)
- Jack Kevorkian (doctor)
- k.d. lang (singer)
- David Letterman (comedian and television host)
- Rush Limbaugh (radio personality)
- Shaquille O'Neal (athlete)
- Stan Winston (special effect artist)

=== 1994 ===
- Leslie Abramson (defense attorney of Lyle and Erik Menendez)
- Oksana Baiul and Viktor Petrenko (figure skaters)
- Jimmy Carter (former U.S. president)
- Tom Hanks (actor)
- Jerry Jones (owner of the Dallas Cowboys)
- Susan Lucci (actress)
- Nelson Mandela (President of South Africa)
- Rupert Murdoch (entrepreneur)
- Steven Spielberg (filmmaker)
- Barbra Streisand (singer and actress)

=== 1995 ===
- Jim Carrey (actor and comedian)
- Newt Gingrich (Speaker of the United States House of Representatives)
- John F. Kennedy Jr. (attorney and son of President John F. Kennedy)
- Courtney Love (singer)
- Oseola McCarty (philanthropist)
- Rick Nelson (Oklahoma City Bombing rescuer)
- Colin Powell (Former General)
- Christopher Reeve (actor)
- Monica Seles (athlete)
- Ted Turner (media executive)

=== 1996 ===
- Oksana Baiul (figure skater)
- Bill Clinton (President of the United States)
- Michael Crichton (author)
- Tom Cruise (actor)
- Elizabeth Dole (wife of presidential candidate Bob Dole)
- Shannon Lucid (astronaut)
- Rosie O'Donnell (actress, comedian and television host)
- Benjamin Netanyahu (Prime Minister of Israel)
- Dennis Rodman (athlete)
- Martha Stewart (television personality)
- Kerri Strug (gymnast)

=== 1997 ===
- Madeleine Albright (Secretary of State)
- Ellen DeGeneres (comedian and actress)
- Michael Flatley (choreographer)
- Kathie Lee Gifford (television personality)
- Alan Greenspan (economist and Chairman of the Federal Reserve)
- Elton John (singer and songwriter)
- Arnold Schwarzenegger (actor)
- Prince William of Wales (second in line to the British throne)
- Ian Wilmut (embryologist) (represented by Dolly)
- Tiger Woods (athlete)

=== 1998 ===
- James Cameron (film director)
- Calista Flockhart (actress)
- Bill Gates (founder of Microsoft)
- John Glenn (Astronaut and U.S. Senator)
- Tom Hanks (actor)
- Geri Halliwell (singer)
- Mark McGwire (athlete)
- Chris Rock (actor and comedian)
- Jerry Springer (television host)
- Mother Teresa

=== 1999 ===
- King Abdullah II (King of Jordan)
- Johnathan Lee Iverson (circus ringmaster)
- Monica Lewinsky (former White House intern)
- Susan Lucci (actress)
- Ricky Martin (singer)
- Sumner Redstone (multimedia tycoon)
- Joe Torre (New York Yankees manager)
- Jesse Ventura (Minnesota Governor and former pro-wrestler)
- Lance Armstrong (cyclist)

=== 2002 ===
- Robert Atkins (nutritionist)
- Halle Berry (actress)
- Laura Bush (First Lady of the United States)
- Elizabeth II (British monarch)
- Sarah Hughes (figure skater)
- Tobey Maguire (actor)
- Phil McGraw (television host and author)
- Chief Moose (law enforcement officer)
- Ozzy Osbourne (singer and actor)
- Sherron Watkins (Enron whistle-blower)

=== 2003 ===
- Ben Affleck (actor)
- Hillary Clinton (Senator and former First Lady)
- Siegfried Fischbacher and Roy Horn (stage performers)
- Tommy Franks (U.S. Army general)
- LeBron James (athlete)
- Beyoncé Knowles (singer and actress)
- Jennifer Lopez (singer and actress)
- Queer Eye for the Straight Guy hosts (Ted Allen, Kyan Douglas, Thom Filicia, Carson Kressley, Jai Rodriguez)
- Arnold Schwarzenegger (actor and California Governor)
- Martha Stewart (television host)

=== 2004 ===
- Sergey Brin and Larry Page (founders of Google)
- Mel Gibson (actor and film director)
- Paris Hilton (socialite)
- Ken Jennings (game show contestant)
- Michael Moore (film director)
- Usher Raymond (singer and actor)
- Karl Rove (political consultant)
- Curt Schilling (athlete)
- Donald Trump (Entrepreneur and television personality, future president of the United States)
- Oprah Winfrey (television host, actress and philanthropist)

=== 2005 ===
- Lance Armstrong (athlete)
- Tom Cruise (actor)
- Dakota Fanning (actress)
- Jamie Foxx (actor, comedian and singer)
- Teri Hatcher (actress)
- Beth Holloway-Twitty (mother of Natalee Holloway)
- Thomas Mesereau (attorney)
- Camilla Parker Bowles (The Duchess of Cornwall)
- Condoleezza Rice (Secretary of State)
- Kanye West (rapper)

=== 2006 ===
- Andre Agassi (athlete)
- Sacha Baron Cohen (actor and comedian)
- Patrick Dempsey (actor)
- Joel Osteen (evangelist)
- Steve Irwin and Terri Irwin (television personalities)
- Jay-Z (rapper and businessman)
- Nancy Pelosi (Speaker of the United States House of Representatives)
- Brad Pitt and Angelina Jolie (actors)
- John Ramsey (father of JonBenét Ramsey)
- Anna Wintour (fashion editor)

=== 2007 ===
- Tom Anderson and Chris DeWolfe (entrepreneur)
- David Beckham and Victoria Beckham (supercouple)
- Hugo Chavez (President of Venezuela)
- Bill Clinton (42nd President of the United States)
- Katherine Heigl (actress)
- Jennifer Hudson (singer and actress)
- Don Imus (radio host and writer)
- J.K. Rowling (author)
- Justin Timberlake (singer and actor)

=== 2008 ===
- Thomas Beatie (transgender man)
- Tom Cruise (actor)
- Miley Cyrus (singer and actress)
- Frank Langella (actor)
- Rush Limbaugh (radio talk show host)
- Barack Obama (President-elect of the United States)
- Sarah Palin (politician, author, and speaker)
- Tina Fey (comedian, actress, writer, and producer)
- Michael Phelps (swimmer)
- Will Smith (actor and rapper)

=== 2009 ===
- Glenn Beck (radio and television host)
- Brett Favre (football quarterback)
- Lady Gaga (singer and actress)
- Kate Gosselin (television personality)
- The children of Michael Jackson
- Adam Lambert (singer)
- Michelle Obama (First Lady of the United States)
- Sarah Palin (politician, author, and speaker)
- Tyler Perry (actor, director, and author)
- Jenny Sanford (First Lady of South Carolina, heiress, and investment banker)

=== 2010 ===
- Tiger Woods (athlete)
- Sandra Bullock (actress)
- LeBron James (athlete)
- The cast of Jersey Shore (reality television stars)
- Jennifer Lopez (actress and singer)
- Kate Middleton (now The Princess of Wales, spouse of William, Prince of Wales)
- Sarah Palin (politician)
- David Petraeus (U.S. Army general)
- Betty White (actress)
- Mark Zuckerberg (creator of Facebook)

=== 2011 ===
- Steve Jobs (former Apple CEO)
- Simon Cowell (television personality)
- Jesse Tyler Ferguson & Eric Stonestreet (actors)
- Derek Jeter (New York Yankees baseball player)
- Donald Trump (business magnate)
- Katy Perry (singer)
- Pippa Middleton (socialite & sister of Catherine, Princess of Wales)
- Amanda Knox (acquitted of murder)
- Herman Cain (businessman/politician)
- The Kardashian family (socialites & reality television stars)

=== 2012 ===
- Prince Harry (fourth in the line of succession to the British throne)
- Ben Affleck (actor and director)
- Honey Boo Boo (reality show star)
- Chris Christie (Governor of New Jersey)
- Hillary Clinton (Secretary of State)
- Gabrielle Douglas (Olympic gold medal gymnast)
- E.L. James (author)
- Seth MacFarlane (actor, animator, director, and singer)
- One Direction (pop music band)
- David Petraeus (U.S. Army general)

=== 2013 ===
- Jennifer Lawrence (actress)
- Robin Roberts (news anchor)
- Edward Snowden (former NSA contractor and leaker)
- Prince George (third in the line of succession to the British throne)
- The Robertson Family (reality television stars)
- Kim Kardashian (reality television star and socialite)
- Kanye West (rapper)
- Miley Cyrus (singer)
- Pope Francis (266th Pope of the Catholic Church)
- Hillary Clinton (politician)

While previews of the show listed swimmer Diana Nyad, she was not included in the final broadcast.

=== 2014 ===
Broadcast date: December 14, 2014

- Scarlett Johansson (actress)
- Chelsea Handler (comedian)
- Neil Patrick Harris (actor/host)
- David H. Koch (businessman, philanthropist, political figure)
- Oprah Winfrey (former television host)
- Elon Musk (businessman and engineer/inventor)
- Michael Strahan (former NFL player and television host)
- George R. R. Martin (author)
- Taylor Swift (singer)
- Amal Clooney (lawyer, activist, and author)

=== 2015 ===
Broadcast date: December 17, 2015 (third Thursday of December)

- Amy Schumer (comedian, actress)
- Donald Trump (businessman, TV host, political figure, candidate for President of the United States)
- Tracy Morgan (comedian, actor)
- Misty Copeland (ballet dancer)
- Ronda Rousey (mixed-martial-arts fighter)
- Donna Karan (fashion designer)
- Bernie Sanders (U.S. Senator)
- Jeff Bezos (businessman)
- Bradley Cooper (actor, producer)
- Caitlyn Jenner (Olympic decathlete, TV personality)

== Milestones ==
- First Person to be featured on two lists: Tom Hanks in 1994 and 1998
- First Person to be featured on three lists and four lists: Hillary Clinton in 1993, 2003, 2012 and 2013
- First Person to be featured consecutively on the Most Fascinating list: Sarah Palin in 2008, 2009 and 2010

=== Multiple inclusions ===
4 times

- Hillary Clinton

3 times

- Sarah Palin
- Donald Trump

2 times

- Ben Affleck
- Lance Armstrong
- Oksana Baiul
- Tom Cruise
- Miley Cyrus
- Tom Hanks
- Kim Kardashian (once as "The Kardashian Family" in 2011 and as an individual in 2013)
- Rush Limbaugh
- Jennifer Lopez
- Susan Lucci
- David Petraeus
- Martha Stewart
- Kanye West
- Tiger Woods
- Oprah Winfrey
- Caitlyn Jenner (once as "The Kardashian Family" in 2011 and as an individual in 2015)
