= Donald Hunt (sportswriter) =

American sportswriter

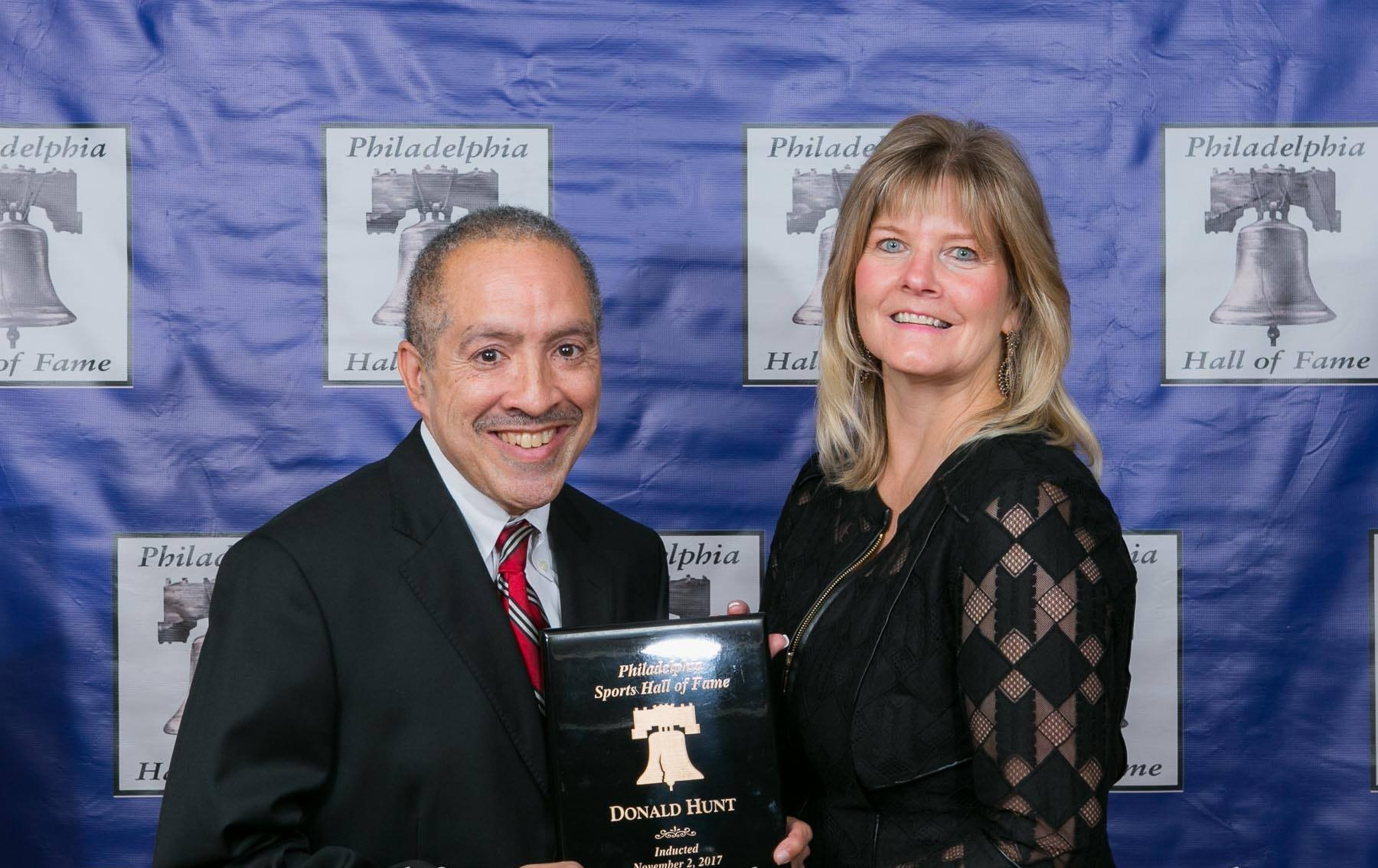
- Born: Darby, Pennsylvania, U.S.
- Education: B.A., 1977, Lincoln University
- Occupation: Journalist
- Spouse: Patricia (married)
- Children: 2

Donald Hunt is an American sportswriter for the Philadelphia Tribune. He became the first African-American sportswriter to enter the Philadelphia Sports Hall of Fame.

== Career ==
After graduating from Lincoln University, Hunt began his journalism career in the 1980s where he wrote for the News of Delaware County. He was eventually recruited by Herm Rogul to join the Philadelphia Tribune in 1983.

In 2008, Hunt led a campaign to earn Wilt Chamberlain his own commemorative U.S. postage stamp. As part of his campaign, Hunt dedicated a section in the Tribune for Chamberlain and started a petition. A few years later, Hunt was named the 2011 “Journalist of the Year” by the National Association of Black Journalists in honor of his sportswriting career.

In 2016, Hunt was inducted into the Philadelphia Black Basketball Hall of Fame for his contributions to the game of basketball in Philadelphia. The following year he became the first African-American sportswriter to enter the Philadelphia Sports Hall of Fame.

== Personal life ==
Hunt and his wife Patricia have a daughter together who was named a Philadelphia Eagles Cheerleader in 2019.
