= Iverson =

Iverson may refer to:

== Computing ==
- Iverson Award, an ACM honour for APL contributions
- Iverson bracket, a mathematical notation
- Iverson Notation, the syntactic basis of APL (programming language)

== Other uses ==
- Iverson Movie Ranch, Chatsworth, California
- "White Iverson", Post Malone's debut single
- Iverson, a bicycle brand of Stelber Cycle Corp

== People named Iverson ==
- Iverson (surname), people with the surname
- Iverson L. Harris (1805–1876), American judge
- Iverson Molinar (born 1999), Panamanian basketball player

== See also ==
- Iversen (disambiguation)
