= Olga Dorfner =

American swimmer (1898–1983)

- Dorfner wearing a hat circa 1920

Personal information
- Full name: Olga F. Dorfner -Shoenhut
- Nationality: American
- Born: May 30, 1898 Philadelphia, Pennsylvania, U.S.
- Died: May 7, 1983 (aged 84) Philadelphia, Pennsylvania
- Spouse: Harry E. Shoenhut (m. 1920)

Sport
- Sport: Swimming
- Events: 25-300 yard freestyle distances Held many records
- Strokes: Freestyle
- Club: Turngemeinde Club; Philadelphia, PA
- Coach: Noah Marks, Fred Cady (Turngemeinde)

Olga Dorfner (May 30, 1898 in Philadelphia – May 7, 1983) also known her married name Olga Dorfner Schoenhut by 1920, was an American competitive swimmer who set both world and American freestyle records primarily at sprint distances. She swam and trained with Philadelphia's Turngemeinde Club, where she was coached by Fred Cady, who coached several U.S. Olympic diving teams.

== Early life ==
Dorfner was born May 30, 1898, one of around five siblings in greater Philadelphia to father Anton Louis and mother Emilie V. Dorfner. Her father Anton, who lived in Margate City, New Jersey after 1922, owned and managed the company Anton Dorfner and Sons, a Philadelphia-based firm specializing in dyeing and cleaning. Showing swimming skills by the age of 11, around 1910, she equaled the women's record for the 25-yard freestyle event, and generally excelled at shorter distance events in her career. She did much of her training for the strong athletic and swimming program at greater Philadelphia's Turngemeinde Club. By the age of 13, she was tutored in swimming by Noah Marks at the Turgenmeinde Pool. At the Turngemeinde, Dorfner was coached by Fred Cady, a highly accomplished local coach, who mentored 1924-1928 Olympian Betty Becker, an accomplished swimmer and diver, and Gertrude Artelt, who held several national swimming records. Cady later coached at the University of Southern California.

From 1910-20, Dorfner equaled or broke nearly every women's swimming record for distances under 300 yards. She would have likely made the 1916 Olympics, but they did not take place due to the First World War.

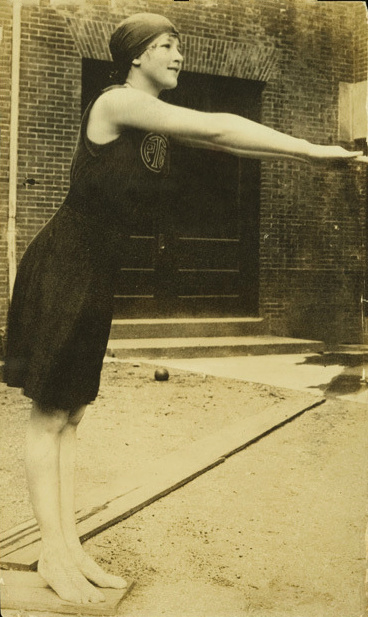
Olga Dorfner, circa 1917

For winning the national championships of 1916 she won a vase that featured her image as a portrait. She donated the vase to the International Swimming Hall of Fame after her induction in 1970.

A case of measles in July, 1918 sidelined her for several weeks from national swimming competition, though she had continued to achieve as a swimmer that year.

== International records ==
In 1918 she became the first American woman to break a swimming world record, accomplishing the feat in the 200 meter freestyle and the 100 yard (91 m) freestyle swims. Her time in the 100-yard sprint was 1:06, and in the 220 freestyle event 2:56, both considered international records at the time.

In 1918, she was selected as a swimmer of the year in a newspaper pole.

== National records ==
As of 1918, her record in 100 yards was 1:06.2. She held American records in the 40 yd, 50 yd, 60 yd, 80 yd and 220 yd and was a US champion in the 50 yd (1916), 100 yd (1916–1918), 220 yd (1917) yd and 440 yd (1917) freestyle events. She did not participate in Summer Olympics due to World War I, and then due to childbirth in 1920.

== Red Cross spokesperson ==
By 1916, she worked and appeared at Red Cross benefits with Olympian Duke Kahanamoku.

== Marriage ==
Dorfner married Harry Edison Shoenhut, around 1919-2020. Shoenhut was a successful Philadelphia area manufacturer, largely of toys, and owner and manager of the A. Shoenhut Company. The couple had around two children. Dorfer had officially announced her retirement from swimming by the time of her marriage.

After 1947, she lived with her family in Staunton, Virginia, though she returned to Philadelphia in her later years.

Olga Dorner Shoenhut died at 84 on March 7, 1983 at Jenkintown's Rydal Park just North of Philadelphia. Memorial services were held March 10, at greater Philadelphia's Rydel Park Auditorium, and she was buried at Westminster Cemetery. She was predeceased by her husband Harry in 1952 and was survived by a son, a daughter, and four grandchildren.

== Honors ==
In 1970 Dorfner was inducted to the International Swimming Hall of Fame as the first woman member. She became a member of the Philadelphia Sports Hall of Fame in 2021.

== See also ==
- List of members of the International Swimming Hall of Fame
