= Jana Iverson =

Developmental psychologist

- Occupation: Professor of Psychology
- Awards: Chancellor's Distinguished Research Award from the University of Pittsburgh (2007)

Academic background
- Education: Bryn Mawr College, University of Chicago

Jana Marie Iverson is a developmental psychologist known for her research on the development of gestures and motor skills in relation to communicative development. She has worked with various populations including children at high risk of autism spectrum disorder (ASD), blind individuals, and preterm infants. She is currently a professor of Physical Therapy at Boston University.

Iverson received the Chancellor's Distinguished Research Award from the University of Pittsburgh in 2007 for her work on autism.

Iverson co-edited with Susan Goldin-Meadow the book The nature and functions of gesture in children’s communication. The book discusses how gesture and speech become intertwined over the course of development, and gesture development in clinical populations, such as individuals diagnosed with ASD.

== Biography ==
Iverson attended Bryn Mawr College, where she received an A.B. in Psychology in 1991. Subsequently, Iverson attended the University of Chicago, where she earned an M.A. in psychology in 1994, and a Ph.D. in psychology in 1996, under the supervision of Susan Goldin-Meadow. Iverson's dissertation examined the spontaneous gestures of congenitally blind youth (9 to 18 year-olds) and compared them with the gestures of individuals with sight (half of whom were blindfolded during tasks). Iverson completed a postdoctoral fellowship at Indiana University (1997-1999), where she worked with Esther Thelen. She worked at University of Missouri from 1999 to 2003 before joining the faculty of the University of Pittsburgh in 2003. She then joined the faculty at Boston University in 2022.

Iverson participates in the Baby Siblings Research Consortium, a multinational project involving research teams in the United States, Canada, Israel, and the United Kingdom that aims to identify behavioral and biological markers associated with ASD risk by studying infant siblings of children previously diagnosed with ASD. Research to date found that siblings with high genetic risk for ASD exhibited lower developmental functioning (i.e., higher rates of developmental delay) at 3 years of age than children at low risk, even when dataset excluded children who met ASD diagnostic criteria.

Iverson's current research, funded by the National Institutes of Health, studies the development of walking and locomotor exploration in infants at high risk of being diagnosed with ASD, due to the presence of an older sibling with ASD. The study aims relate motor development to growth in infants' social communicative skills with caregivers from 6 to 36 months of age, and infants known to be at heightened risk for motor and communicative delays to infants at low risk.

== Research ==
Iverson's early research explored the role of gesturing in communicative development in individuals who were blind from birth and aimed to answer the question of why people gesture. Iverson and Susan Goldin-Meadow tested two possibilities that were not mutually exclusive. First, speakers may gesture simply because they see others gesture, and learn from this model to move their hands as they talk. To test this, they studied spontaneous gestures in congenitally blind children and adolescents and a control group of sighted children and adolescents. Second, speakers may gesture because they understand that gestures can convey useful information to the listener. To test this, they examined whether speakers gestured even when talking to a listener known to be blind, and thus obviously unable to profit from information conveyed by gesture. The researchers found that gesturing did not depend on either a model or an observer and appeared to be essential to the speaking process itself. Their findings suggest that the gestures that accompany speech may reflect or even facilitate the thinking that underlies speaking.

In a longitudinal study of children at ages 10 to 24 months old, Iverson and Goldin-Meadow examined how children's early gestures support their acquisition of first words and the transition to two-word speech. Using video-recordings of naturalistic observation of caregiver-child interaction, the researchers coded instances of speech or gesture, or a combination of the two. They found that children often referred to objects using gestures prior to acquiring the corresponding words. The child's identification of a referent through gesture both preceded and predicted their learning of its name. Iverson and Goldin-Meadow also found that children's use of a gesture in combination with a word (e.g., pointing at bird while saying "nap") predicted their subsequent production of two-word combinations, such as "bird nap", when the gesture provided information that supplemented the meaning of the word. These findings suggested that gestures and words are tightly linked in early communicative development.

With Esther Thelen, Iverson explored how gestures and other body movements may serve as a foundation for language development. They found that hand and mouth are mutually activated by spontaneous hand/mouth reflexes in newborn infants. Further, by the time they are 16 to 18 months old, infants produce meaningful words and gesture combinations in synchrony. Building on work by David McNeill that views gesture and speech as generated by a unified system for communicating, Iverson traced the developmental origins of the gesture–speech system through studies of vocal–motor coordination. She and a colleague focused on 6- to 9-months infants and how certain gestures of the upper extremities might underlie the coordination of speech and gesture apparent in adults. They found associations between rhythmic movements of the arms (especially the right arm) and increased rates of babbling. The authors suggested that "When an infant is engaged in an intense bout of rhythmic limb activity, for example, the level of activation in the motor system may spill over into the vocal system and entrain its activity." Thus, on account of manual control developing more rapidly than vocal articulation, voluntary limb movements may serve to help infants gain voluntary control over their vocalizations.

== Selected publications ==
- Iverson, J. M. (2010). Developing language in a developing body: The relationship between motor development and language development. Journal of Child Language, 37(2), 229–261.
- Iverson, J. M., & Goldin-Meadow, S. (2005). Gesture paves the way for language development. Psychological Science, 16(5), 367–371.
- Iverson, J. M., & Goldin-Meadow, S. (1998). Why people gesture when they speak. Nature, 396(6708), 228.
- Iverson, J. M., Northrup, J. B., Leezenbaum, N. B., Parladé, M. V., Koterba, E. A., & West, K. L. (2018). Early gesture and vocabulary development in infant siblings of children with Autism Spectrum Disorder. Journal of Autism and Developmental Disorders, 48(1), 55–71.
- Iverson, J. M., & Thelen, E. (1999). Hand, mouth and brain. The dynamic emergence of speech and gesture. Journal of Consciousness Studies, 6(11-12), 19–40.
