= Philadelphia Eagles Cheerleaders =

NFL cheerleader squad

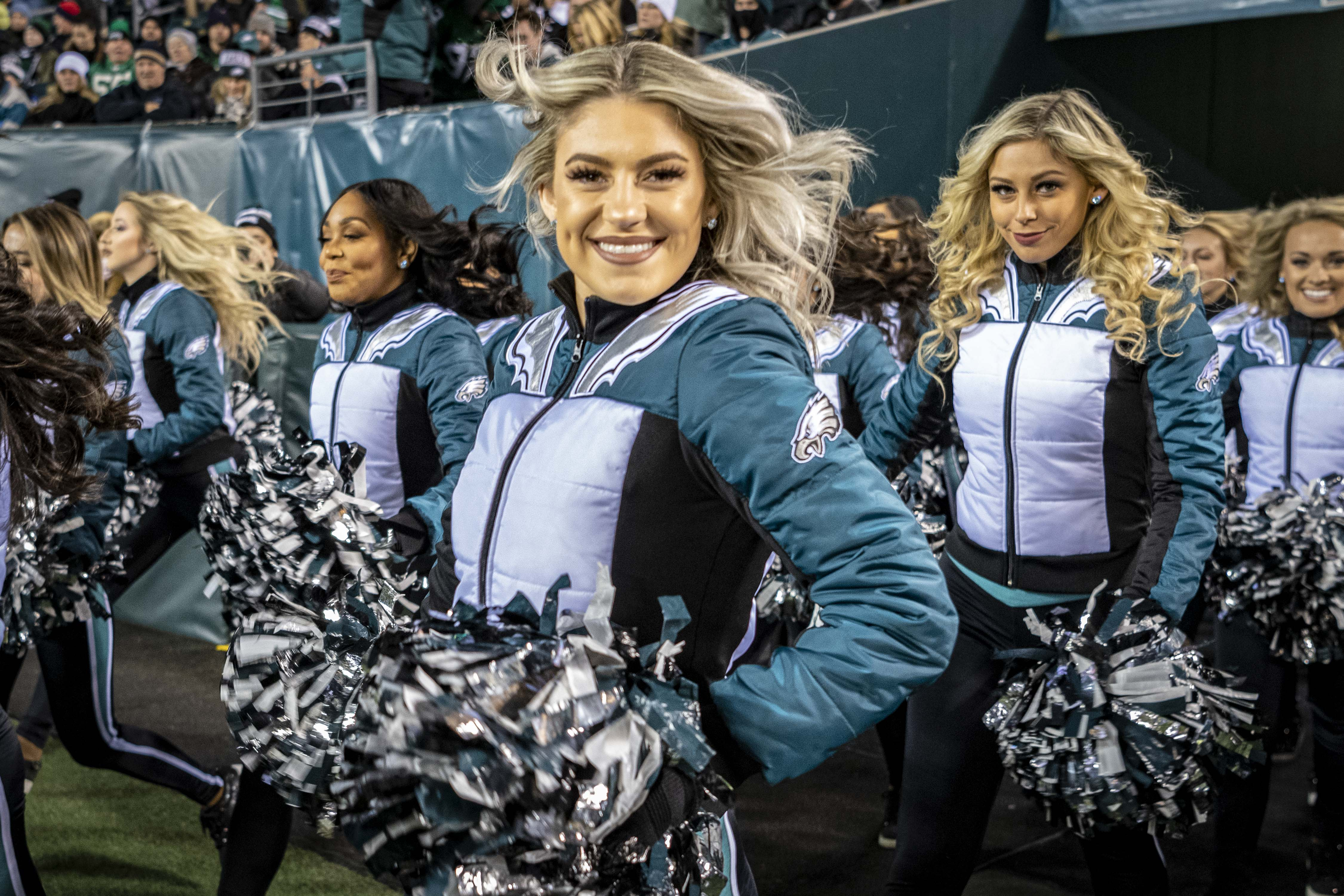
- The Philadelphia Eagles Cheerleaders during a game in 2021
- Established: 1948; 78 years ago (debut)
- Members: 32
- Director: Barbara Zaun
- Affiliations: Philadelphia Eagles
- Website: Official website
- Formerly called: 1948–1970s Eaglettes; 1970s–1980s Liberty Belles; 1980s–present Philadelphia Eagles Cheerleaders

The Philadelphia Eagles Cheerleaders are the cheerleading squad of the Philadelphia Eagles, who plays in the NFL. The squad for the 2025 NFL season features 32 members. The squad debuted in 1948 as the Eaglettes, and became the Liberty Belles in the 1970s, and became the Philadelphia Eagles Cheerleaders in the 1980s. In April, the squad holds annual auditions at the Kimmel Center, with the final auditions being aired on PhiladelphiaEagles.com. The squad, was unique in that it released a swimsuit calendar, but the Eagles Cheerleaders have also released it on Android, as well as iOS for $1.99. Today, the Eagles Cheerleaders releases a booklet about the squad. The squad's director, Barbara Zaun, was a titleholder for Miss USA and Miss America, and also coordinated the Eagles Cheerleaders for Super Bowl XXXIX, the Pro Football Hall of Fame Game, as well as various photo shoots. The squad also makes off-field appearances. The squad has also made an appearance at the 2012 Senior Bowl in Mobile, Alabama. The Philadelphia Eagles Cheerleaders also act as advocates of female empowerment in the Philadelphia area and act as mentors to young girls and women.

== Notable members ==
- Beverly Lynne (1998–2000), adult film actress
- Rachel Washburn (2007–2008), 1st lieutenant in United States Army and Bronze Star Medal recipient.

== Gallery ==
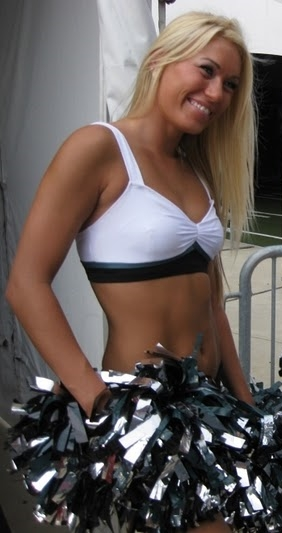

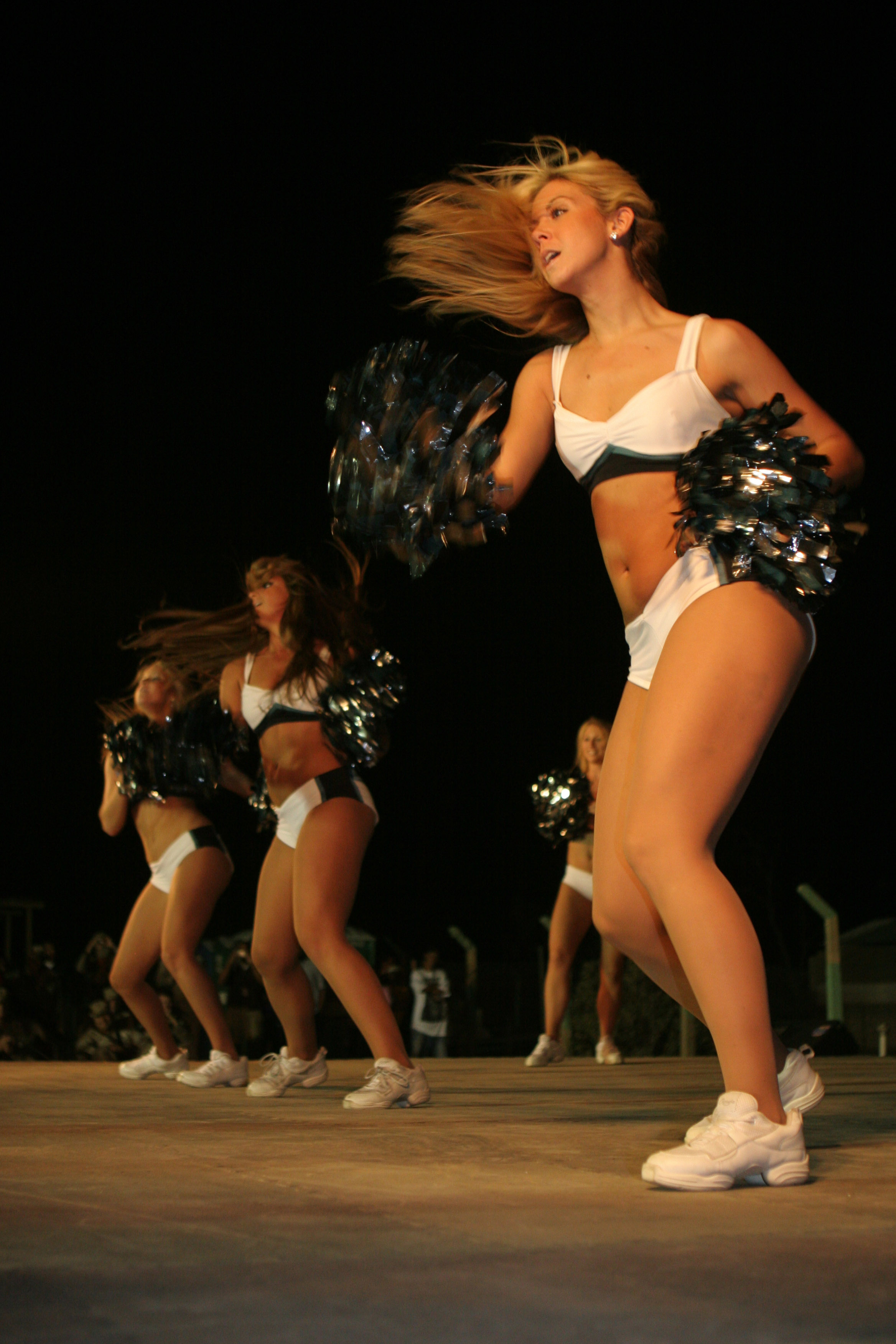

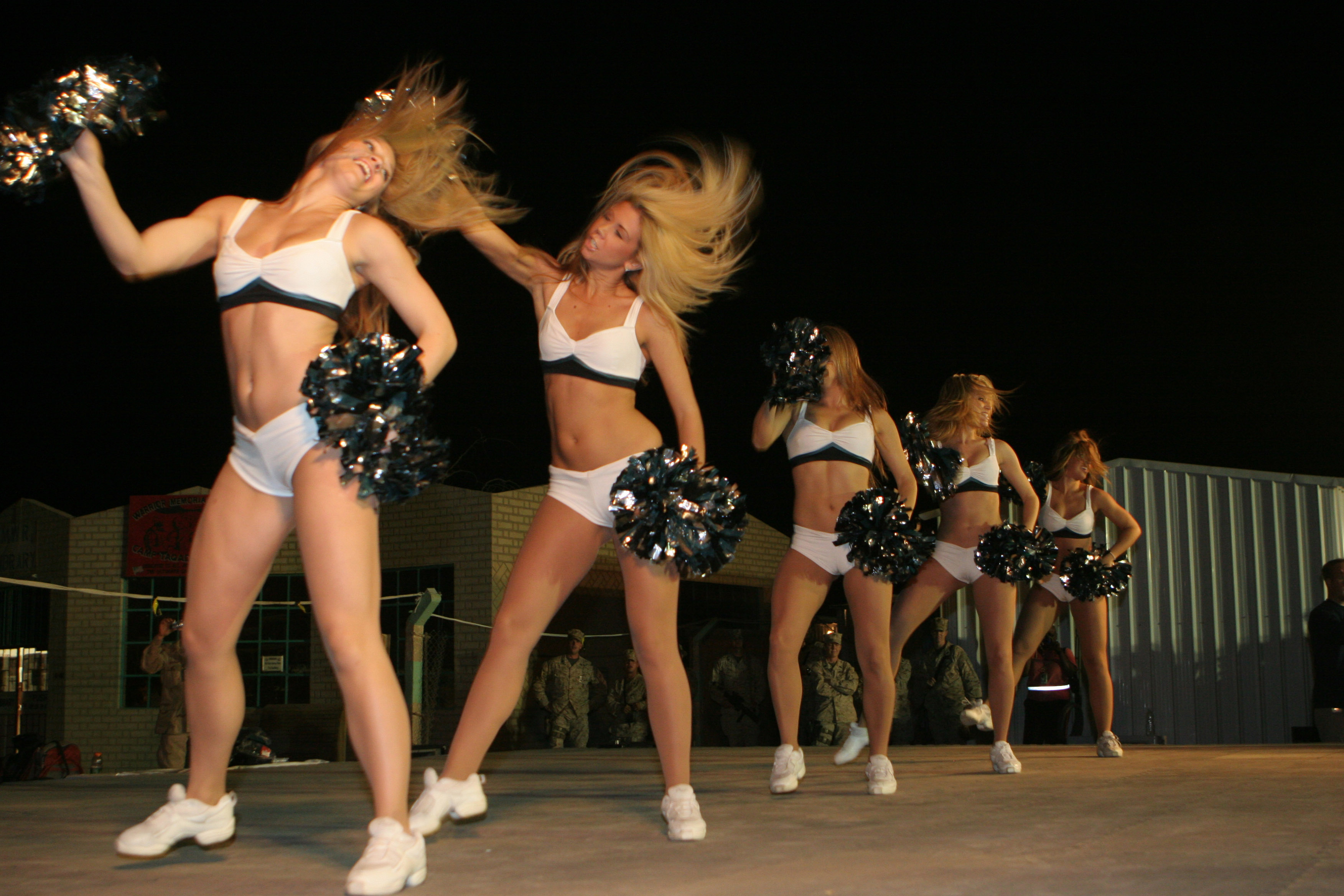

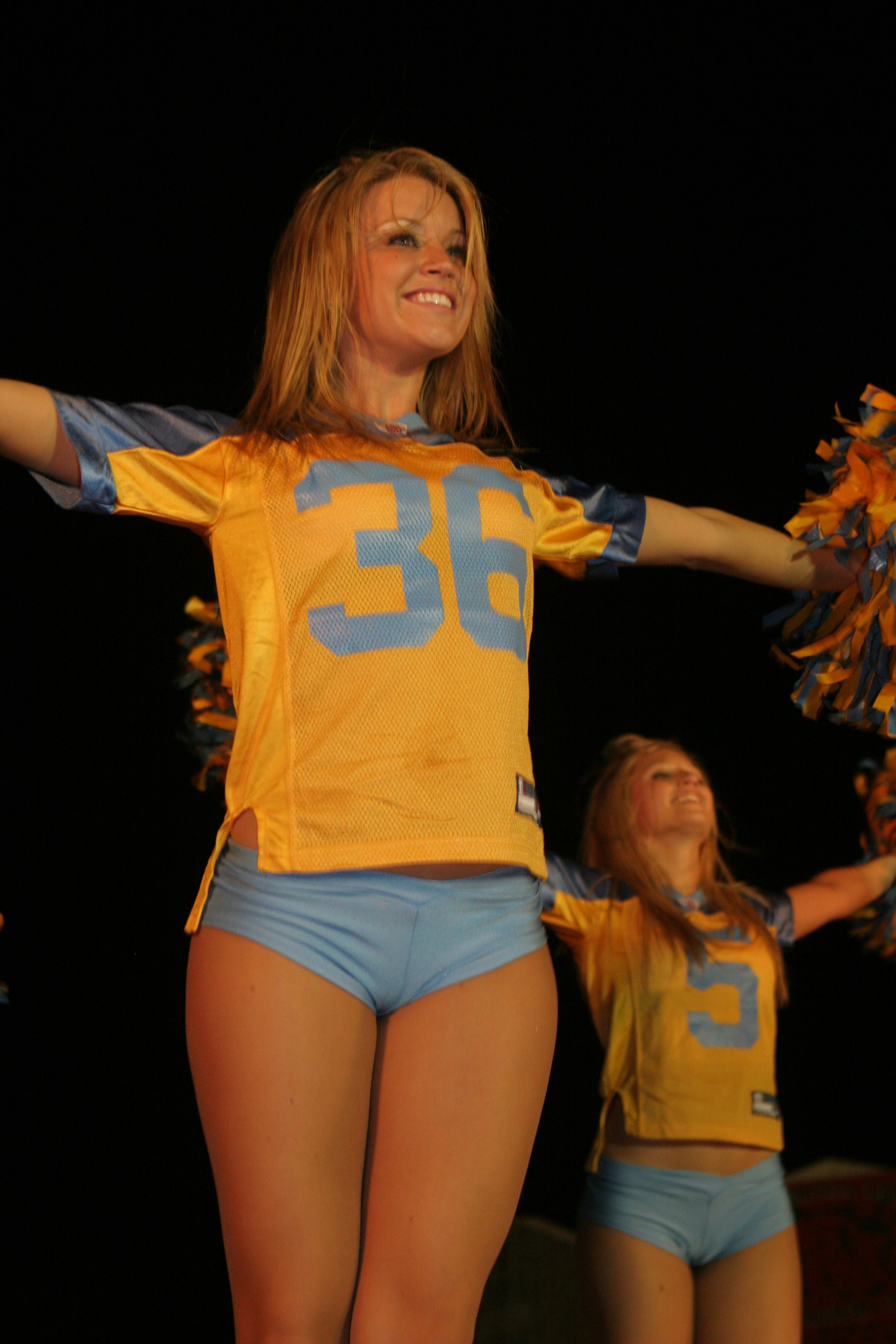

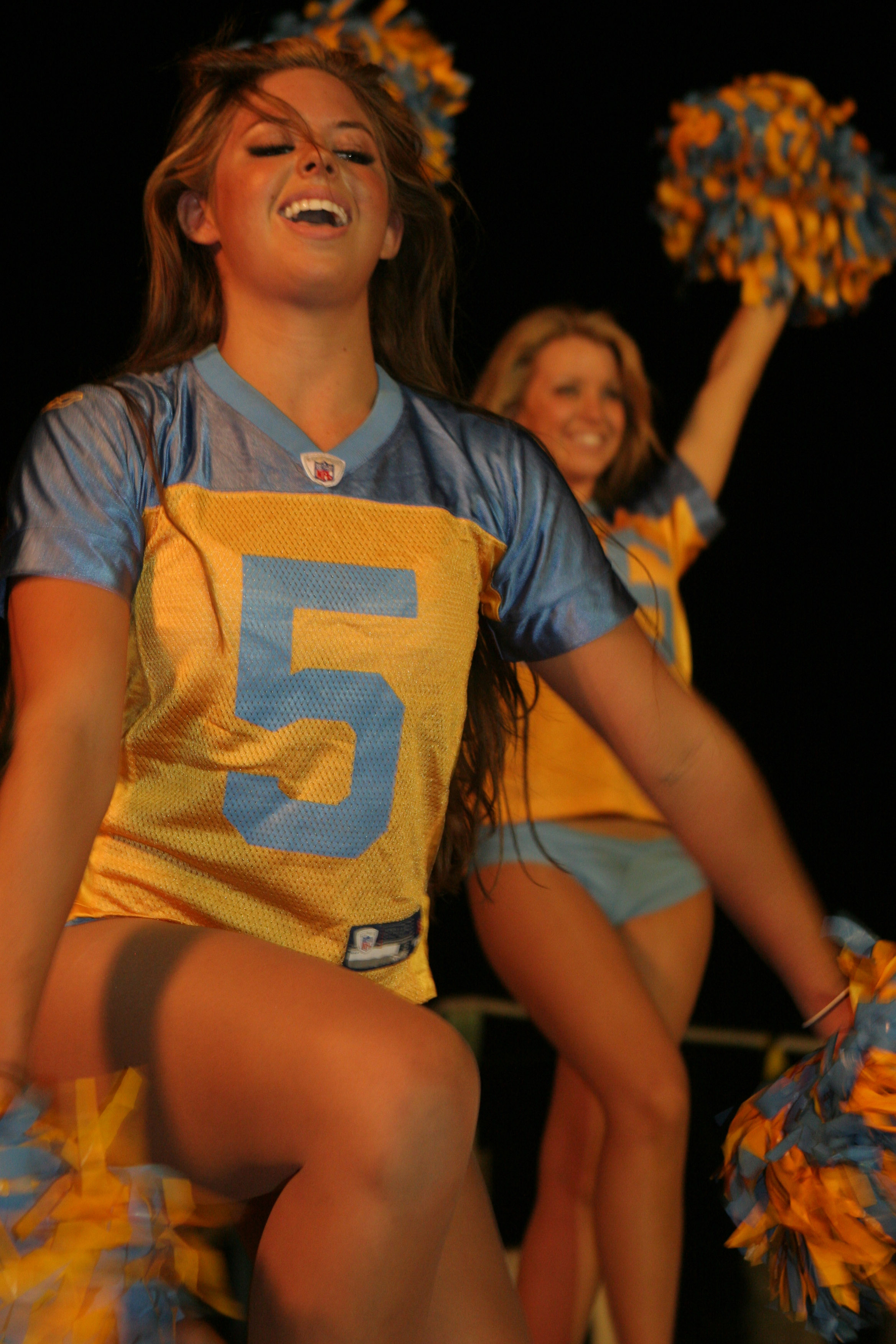

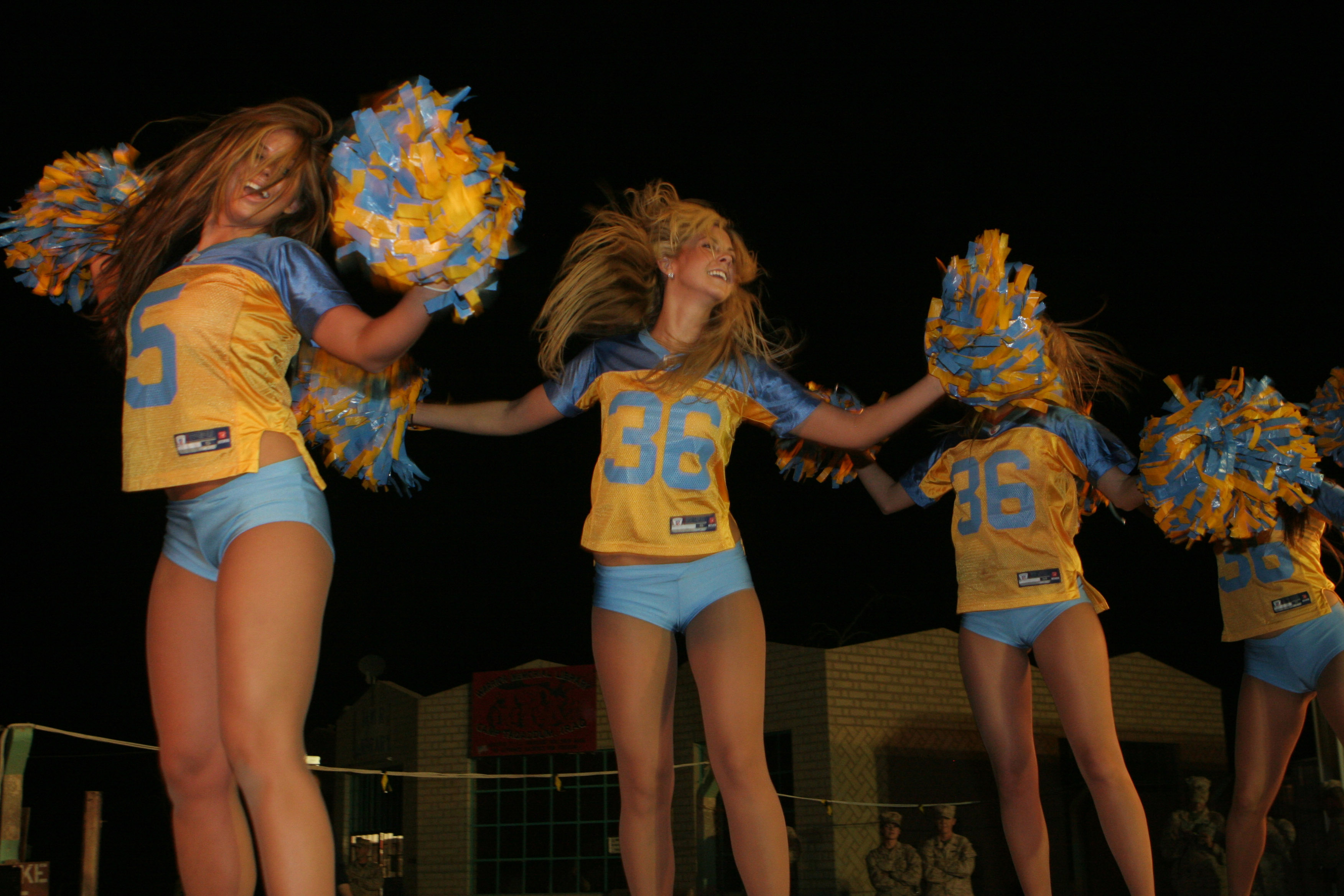

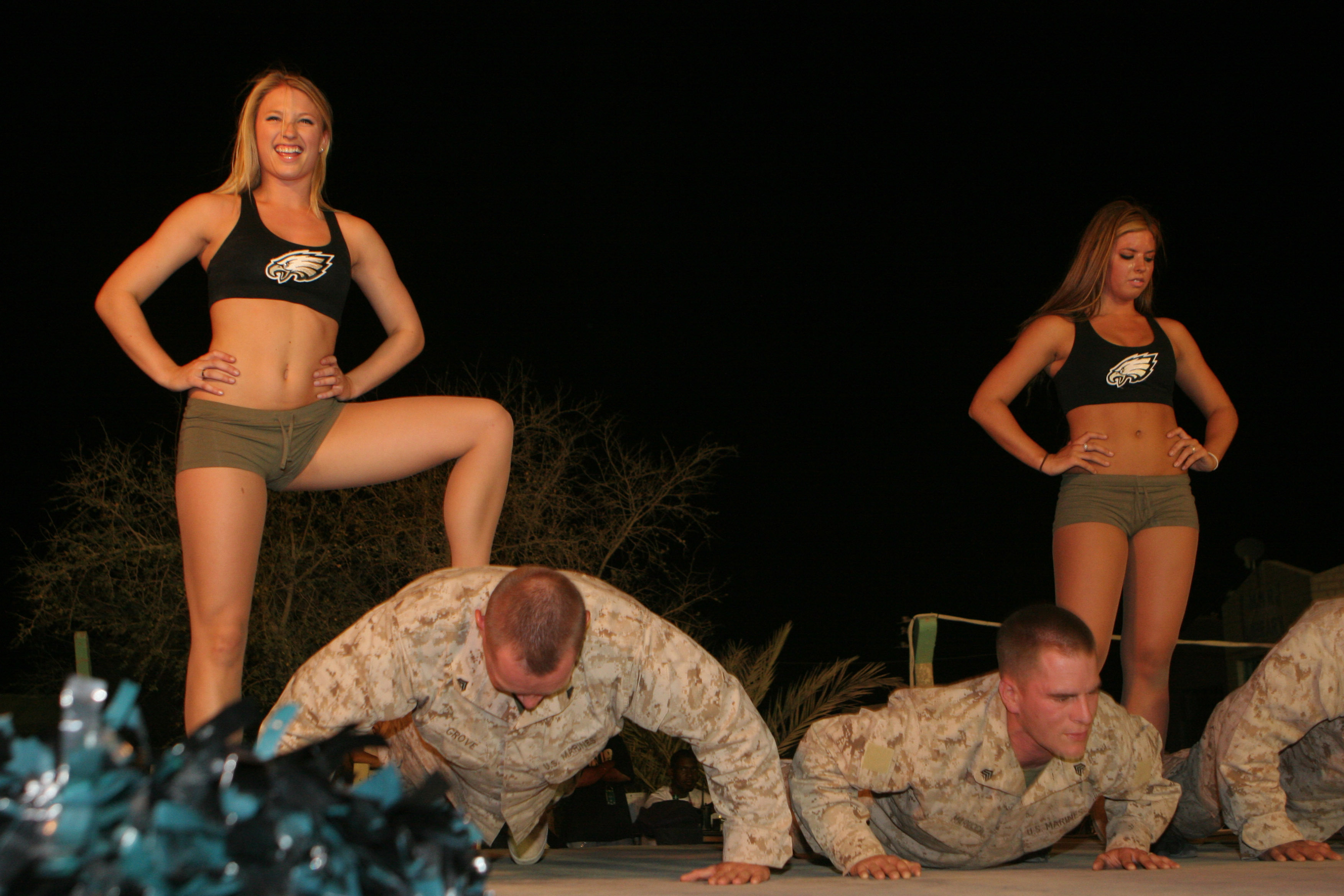

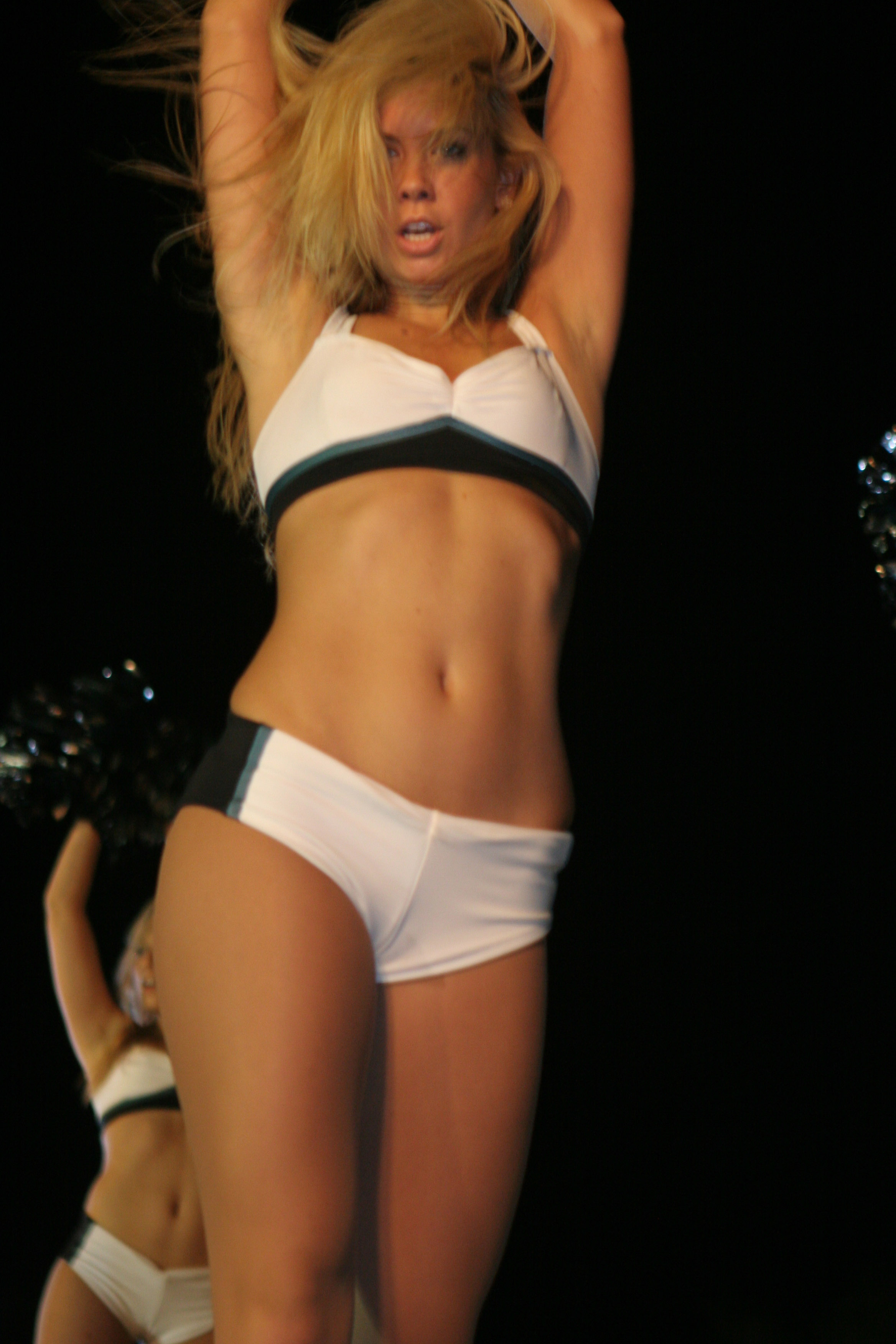
