= Abraham Iverson =

American planter and politician

Member Virginia House of Burgesses
- In office 1653–1653

Personal details
- Occupation: Planter, Politician

Abraham Iverson, shown in some records, including land patents, as Abraham Iveson was a member of the Virginia House of Burgesses, the elected lower house of the colonial Virginia General Assembly, from Gloucester County, in 1653.

On October 17, 1636, James Vanerit acquired 1,000 acres of land in Elizabeth City County, Virginia, now Norfolk, Virginia, from one Stafferton. Stafferton was owed the land for providing the transportation of 20 colonists, including "Abr. Iveson" to Virginia.

A bill of lading of Joseph Clifton, a London merchant shows goods conveyed on the Tristan & Jane of London, April 26, 1637, to "Abraham Iveson, planter", among others.

"Mr. Abraham Iveson" acquired 655 acres of land on the southwest side of the North River in "Mockjack" (or Mobjack) Bay in Gloucester County in a patent dated June 10, 1651.
