= Iversen =

Iversen (Danish pronunciation: [ˈiˀvɐsn̩]) is a Danish-Norwegian patronymic surname meaning "son of Iver", from the Old Norse personal name Ívarr. The Old Norse personal name is composed of the two elements: either ív meaning "yew tree", "bow" or Ing (an old Germanic God); and the element ar meaning "warrior" or "spear". Scandinavian immigrants to English-speaking countries often changed the spelling to Iverson in order to accommodate English orthographic rules.

== People ==
- Baard Iversen (1836–1920), Norwegian businessperson and politician
- Berthel Michael Iversen (1906–1976), Danish architect in Malaysia
- Bjarne Iversen (1912–1999), Norwegian cross country skier
- Bjørn Iversen (born 1953), Norwegian politician
- Daniel Iversen (born 1997), Danish football player
- Duke Iversen (1920–2011), American football player
- Egil Monn-Iversen (1928–2017), Norwegian composer
- Egil Iversen, Norwegian orienteering competitor
- Felix Iversen (1887–1973), Finnish mathematician and pacifist
- Ivar Iversen (1914–2012), Norwegian sprint canoer
- Jan Iversen (1916–1999), Norwegian politician
- Johannes Iversen (1904–1972), Danish palaeoecologist and plant ecologist
- Jon Iversen (1889–1964), Danish actor and director
- Jørgen Iversen Dyppel (1638–1683), Danish governor of St. Thomas in the Danish West Indies
- Julius Iversen (1823–1900), Russian phalerist (scholar of medals)
- Kristen Iversen, American author
- Kræsten Iversen (1886–1955), Danish artist
- Leif Iversen (1911–1989), Norwegian politician
- Niels Kristian Iversen (born 1982), Danish motorcycle speedway rider
- Odd Iversen (1945–2014), Norwegian football player
- Ole Iversen (1884–1953), Norwegian gymnast
- Ragnvald Iversen (1882–1960), Norwegian linguist
- Sindre Iversen (born 1989), Norwegian snowboarder
- Steffen Iversen (born 1976), Norwegian football player
- Sverre Iversen (1879–1967), Norwegian trade unionist, civil servant and politician
- Trond Iversen (born 1976), Norwegian cross country skier
- Turid Iversen (1934–2026), Norwegian politician

== See also ==
- Ivarson (disambiguation)
