= Johnathan Lee Iverson =

American ringmaster (born 1976)

Johnathan Lee Iverson (born January 30, 1976) is an American ringmaster who is the first African-American ringmaster of a major U.S. circus, the Ringling Bros. and Barnum & Bailey Circus.

== Early life and education ==
Iverson grew up in the Central Park West neighborhood of New York City. He attended the Fiorello H. LaGuardia High School of Music & Art and Performing Arts. Later, he graduated from the Hartt School of the University of Hartford, where he received training to become an opera singer.

Iverson began his career with the Boys Choir of Harlem.

== Career ==
=== Ringmaster ===
In 1998, at the age of 22, Iverson joined Ringling Bros. and Barnum & Bailey Circus. He was the first African American ringmaster, as well as the youngest ringmaster at the company. Ebony magazine said of him, "The instant he appears out of the darkness and into the spotlight…the audience is rapt." The San Francisco Examiner stated, "Now imagine mesmerizing the crowd with a powerful voice and the bearing of a superstar." The Times-Picayune described him as, "Tall and self assured…he works a crowd like a three ring evangelist." And a syndicated columnist, Liz Smith expressed her admiration saying, "I…liked six foot [five] youngest ringmaster ever, Johnathan Lee Iverson, who is commanding enough to be noticed in the melee, and he can sing."

In 1999, Iverson was recognized as one of Barbara Walters’ 10 Most Fascinating People. His historical tenure with the Greatest Show On Earth was featured in Black First: 4, 000 Ground-Breaking and Pioneering Historical Events by Jessie Carney Smith, African-American First by Joan Potter, Live Life! Be Young, Black, and Successful by Quincy Benton, and Beat of a Different Drum: The Untold Stories of African-Americans Forging Their Own Paths in Work and Life by Dax-Devlon Ross.

Iverson joined the 129th edition of Ringling Bros. and Barnum & Bailey Presents The Living Carousel in 1998 and continued to perform until Ringling Bros. and Barnum & Bailey closed in 2017. After the circus' closure, he worked as a ringmaster at Circus Vargas and also assumed the role of chairman of the board for Omnium: A Bold New Circus. He was also a founding member of the American Circus Alliance. And in 2021, he worked as a ringmaster for Omnium Circus' world debut.

=== Theater ===
In 2022, Iverson starred in a production of Trav’lin: A 1930s Harlem Musical Romance in Winter Park, Florida.

== Personal life ==
While working with Barnum & Bailey Circus, Iverson married a fellow performer, Priscilla, and the couple had two children, Matthew and Lila, who also performed at Ringling.
