= Joanne Iverson =

American rower and coach (born 1939)

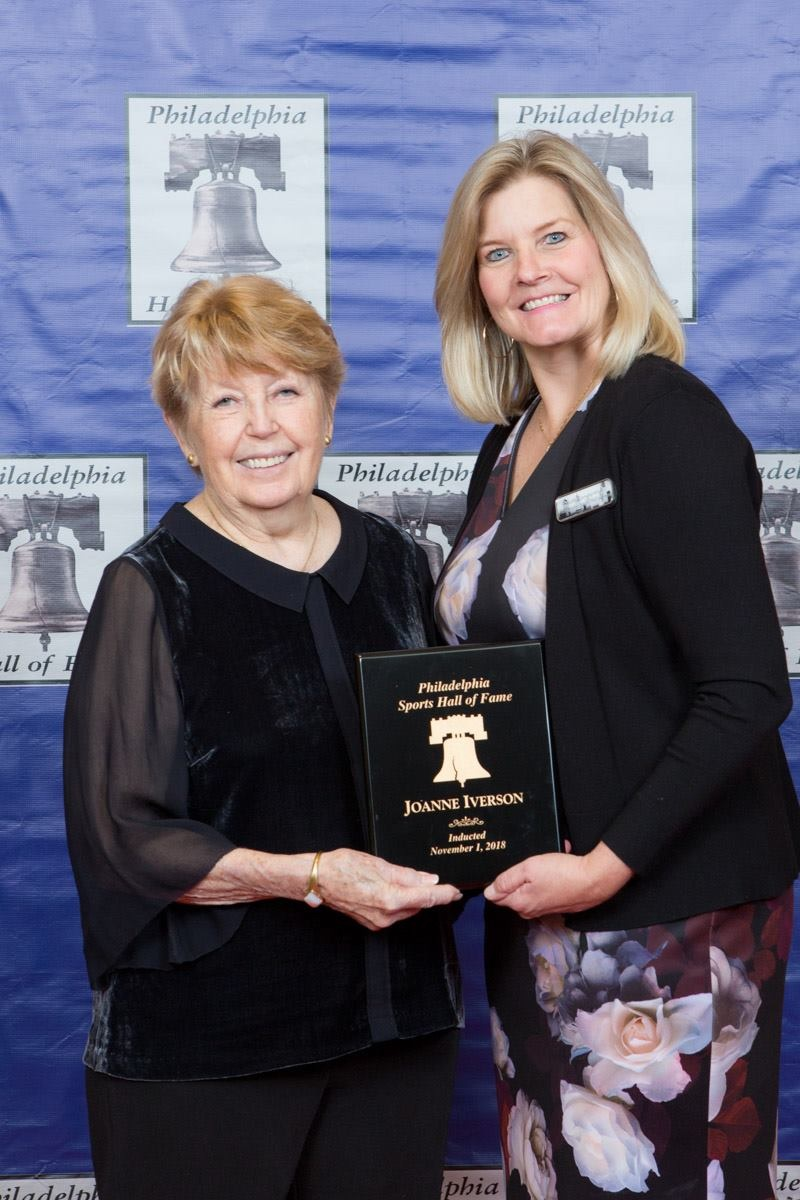
Iverson (left) is inducted into the Philadelphia Sports Hall of Fame in 2018

Joanne Wright Iverson (born September 23, 1939) is an American rower and coach. She was the first coach of women's rowing at the University of Pennsylvania, and was inducted into the Collegiate Rowing Coaches Association Women's Rowing Hall of Fame in 2007. In 2016, she was inducted into the National Rowing Foundation's Hall of Fame for "17 years championing the inclusion of women in Olympic rowing culminating in her managing the women 1976 Olympic Team."

In 1963, Joanne W. Iverson co-founded the National Women's Rowing Association (NWRA) with fellow rowers Ted Nash (Lake Washington Rowing Club) and Ed Lickiss (Lake Merritt Rowing Club).

Her continued promotion of equality in the sport helped to introduce women's rowing into the Olympic Games in Montreal in 1976, where she was a member of the initial United States Women's Olympic Rowing Committee. As Manager of the 1976 women's Olympic rowing team, she helped the team win a bronze medal in the eight and a silver medal in the single sculls.

Iverson was subsequently appointed to President Gerald Ford's Commission on Olympic Sports, serving with Rafer Johnson.

Having begun rowing in 1959, Iverson was named the recipient of USRowing's Ernestine Bayer Award in 2010, for her lifelong efforts and her continued dedication to the sport of rowing.

Iverson's book, An Obsession With Rings: How Rowing Became an Olympic Sport for Women in the United States, was written with Margaret O. Kirk and autobiographically catalogues her efforts to found the NWRA and to introduce women's rowing into the Olympics.

Iverson serves as the President of Vesper Boat Club in Philadelphia, Pennsylvania.
