= Philip Iverson =

Canadian artist (1965–2006)

- Born: 26 January 1965; Fredericton, New Brunswick, Canada
- Died: 13 August 2006 (aged 41); Montreal, Quebec, Canada
- Known for: painter

Philip Iverson (26 January 1965 – 13 August 2006) was a Canadian expressionist painter who gained national attention for his artistry.

He was born in Fredericton, New Brunswick and graduated from Mount Allison University with a Bachelor of Fine Arts degree in 1990. In addition to his painting, he was an art instructor at the New Brunswick College of Craft and Design and after his move to Montreal in 2001, he taught at the Saidye Bronfman Centre. Iverson painted a beautiful picture of trains, which is still today hung in Fredericton High School, the high school from which he graduated.

Iverson died in Montreal at age 41 from brain cancer.
