= Sports in the United States =

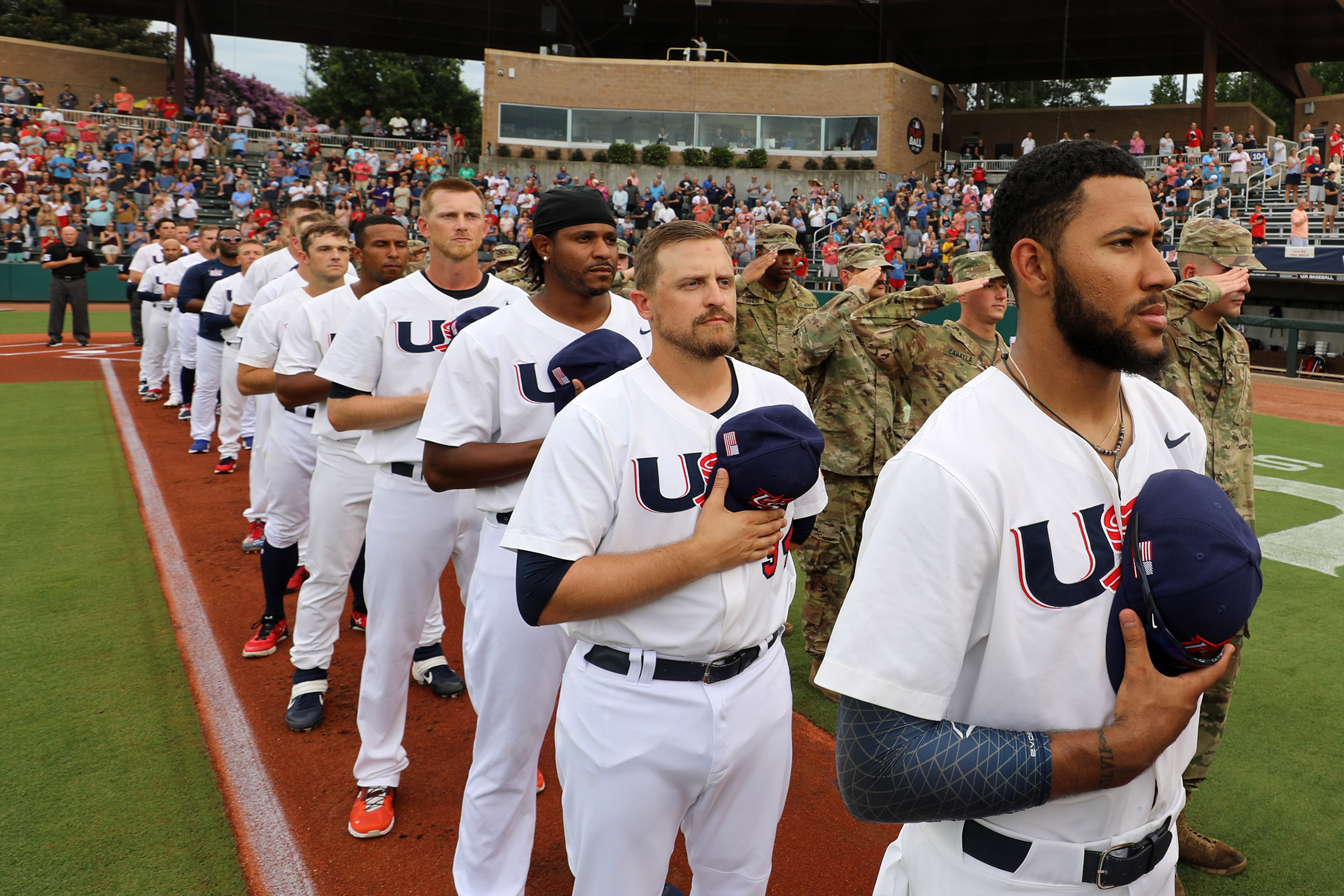
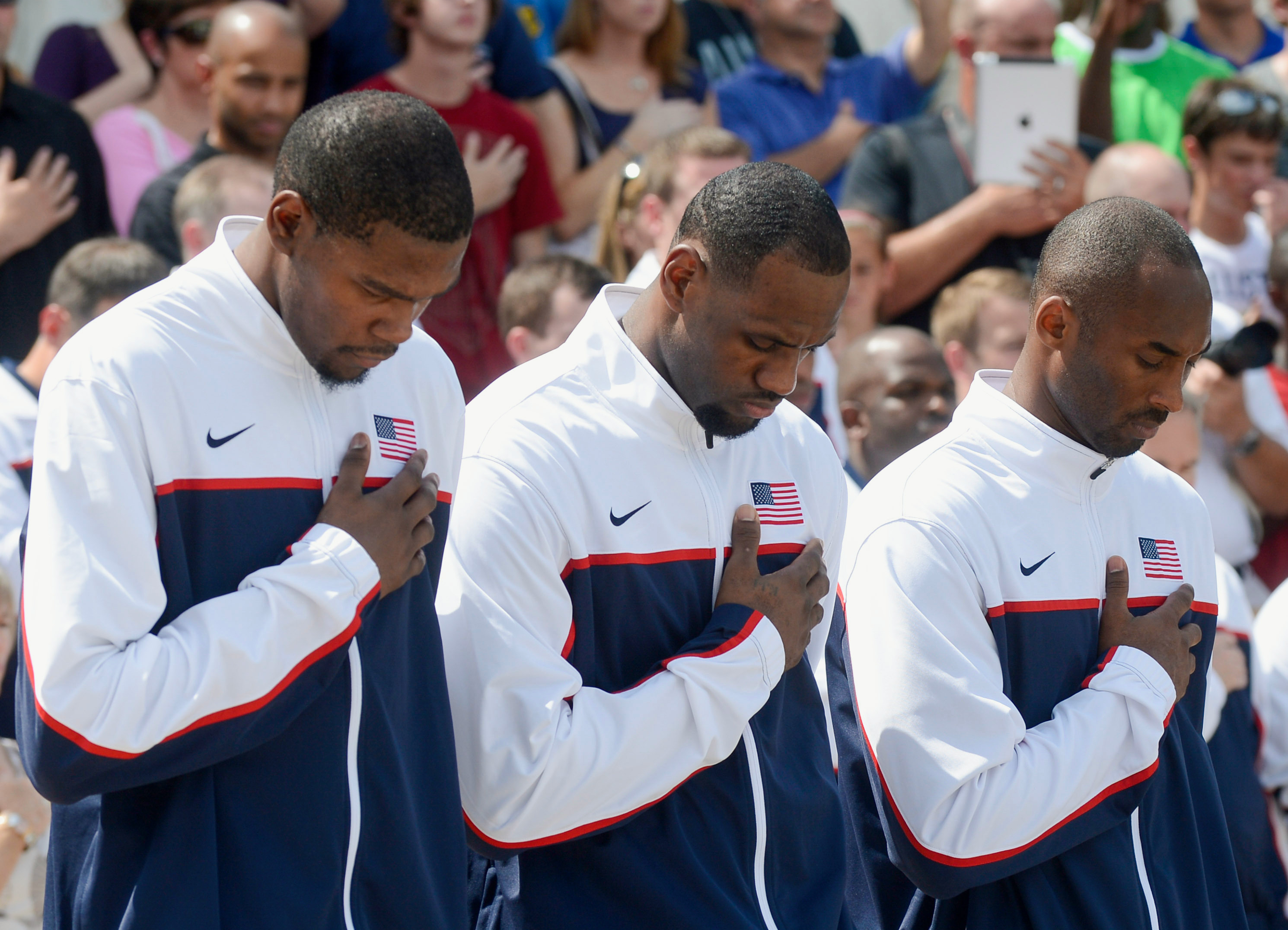
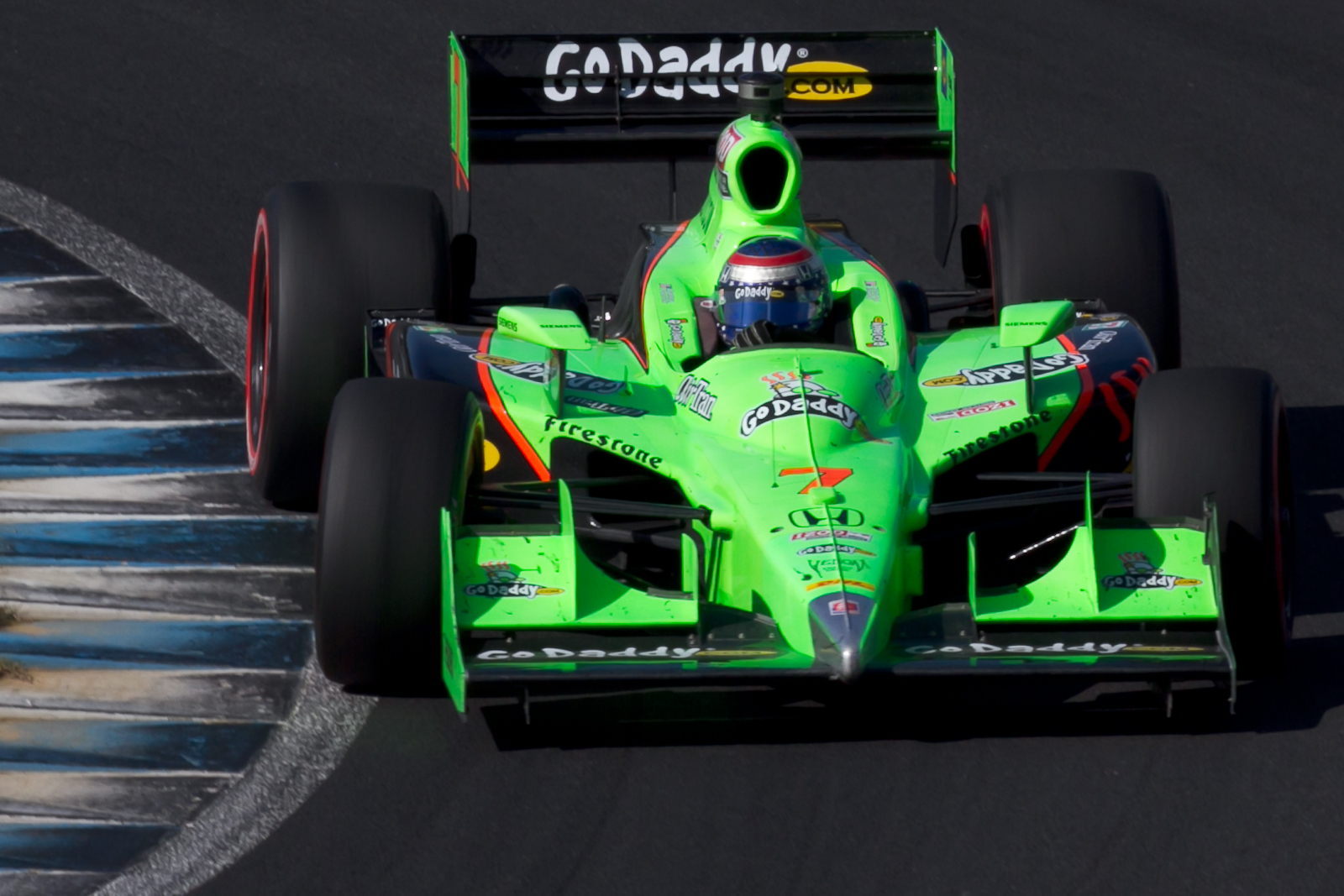
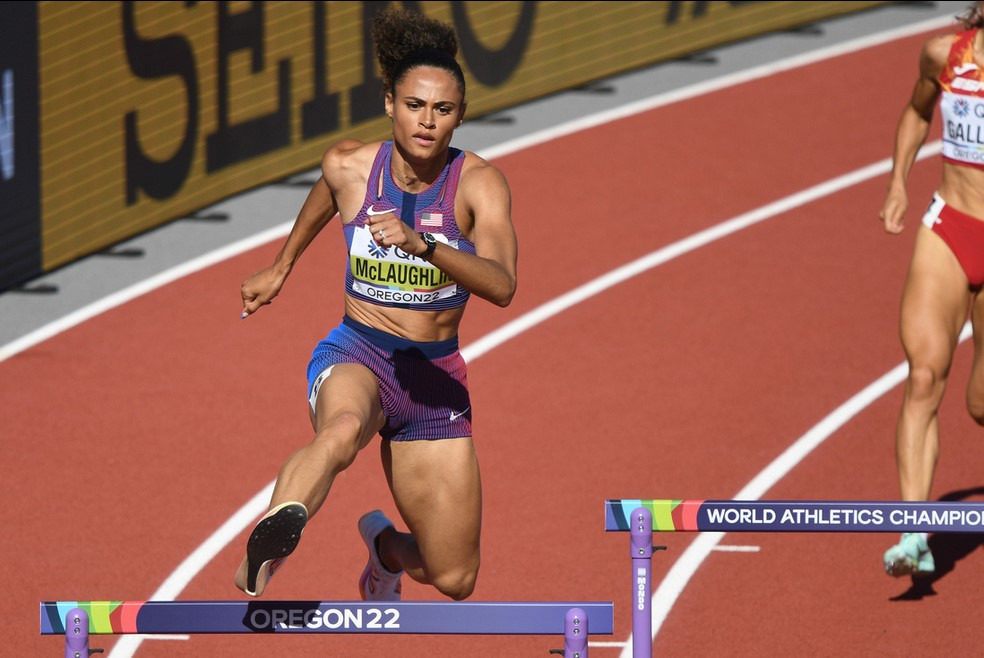
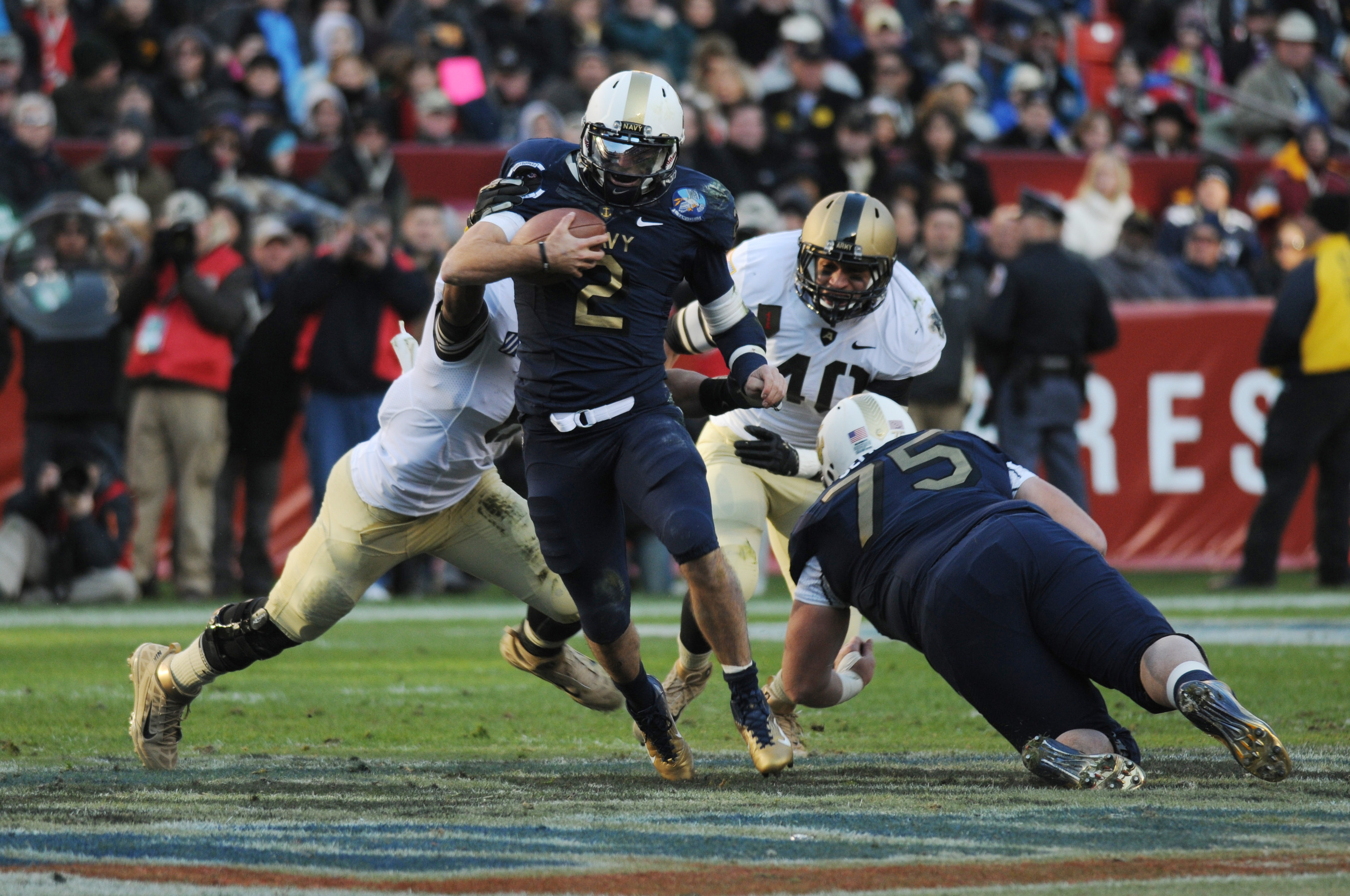
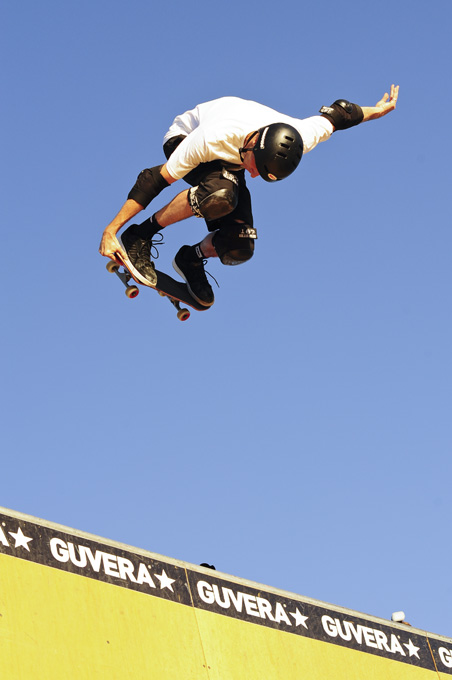
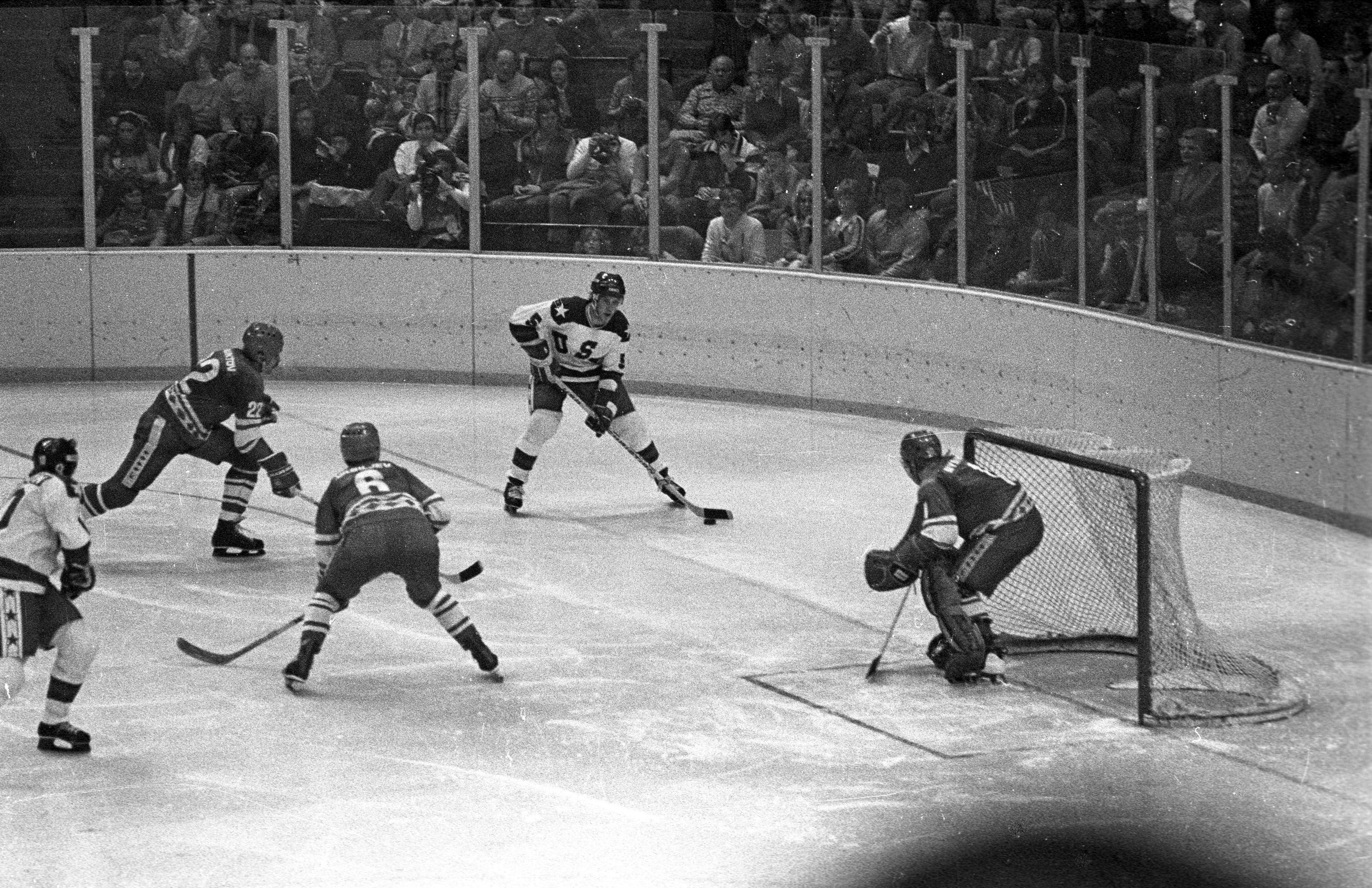
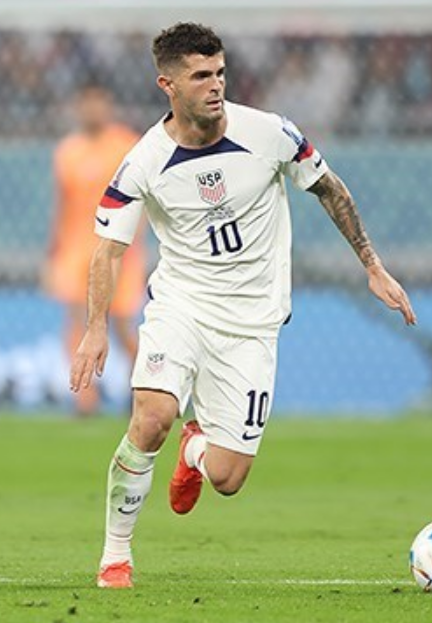
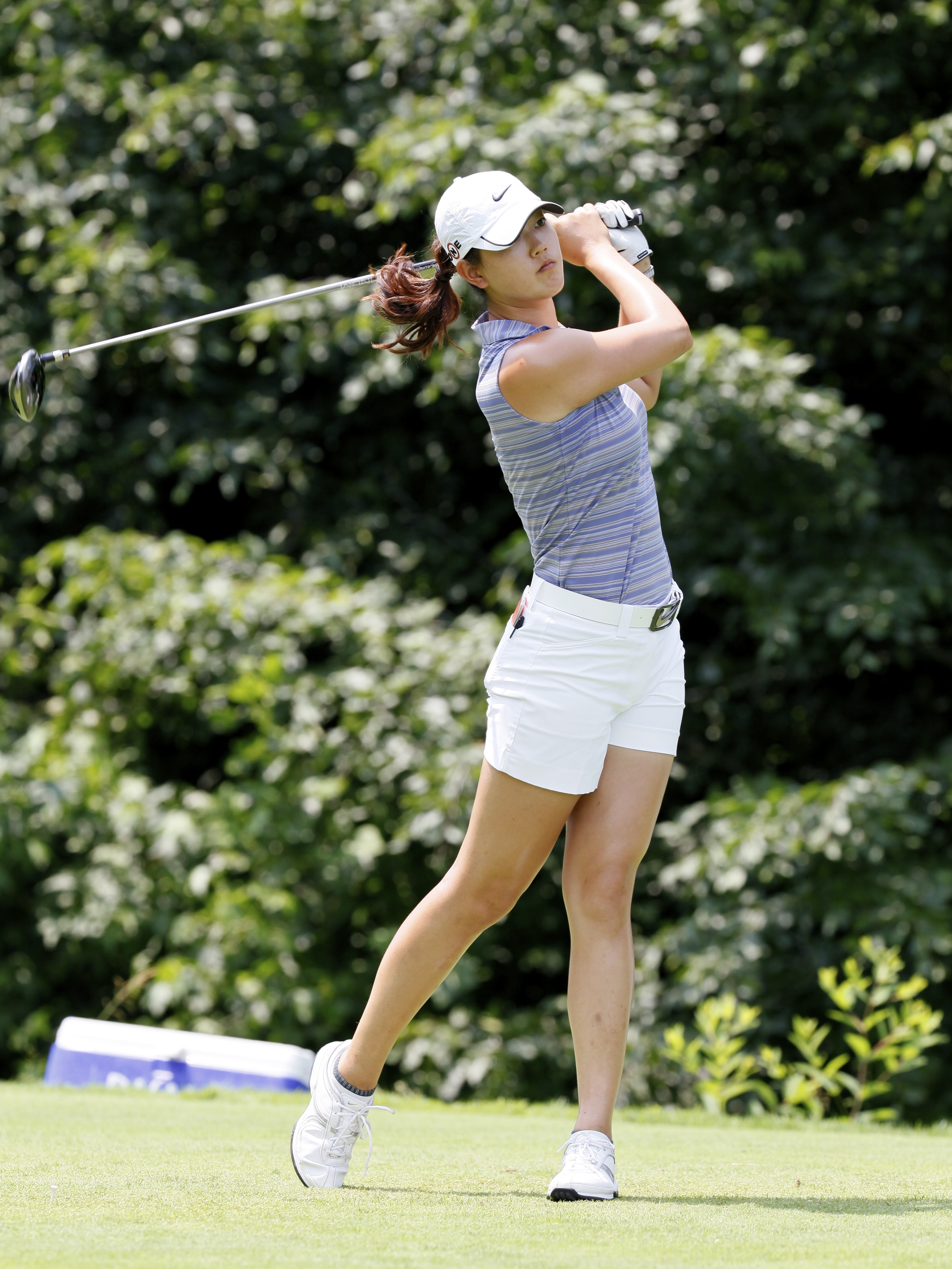
From top, left to right: U.S. baseball team, U.S. men's basketball team, Danica Patrick driving at the IndyCar Series, Sydney McLaughlin, American football Army–Navy Game, the skateboarder Tony Hawk, the 1980 Miracle on Ice hockey game, Christian Pulisic as part of the U.S. men's soccer team, the start of the 2015 Daytona 500, and golfer Michelle Wie West.

Sports in the United States are a significant aspect of the nation's culture. Historically, the most popular sport has been baseball; however, since the mid-20th century American football has slowly become the most popular spectator sport. Additionally, basketball and ice hockey saw a significant growth during this period due to the advent of television. Soccer has emerged as the fourth-most-popular sport in the 21st century, surpassing ice hockey.

In the first half of the 20th century boxing, college rowing, and college football were among the most popular sports after baseball. Golf, tennis, and college basketball are other spectator sports with longstanding popularity. Tennis is currently considered to be the sixth most popular sport in the United States. Most recently, mixed martial arts has been breaking records in attendance and broadcast viewership for all combat sports.

Roughly 27% of United States-based sports fans show an interest in soccer, compared to a global average of 40%. By contrast, American football is the most popular sport in the United States with 52%. Basketball with 43% and baseball with 37% are further behind. Approximately 17% of the people in the United States follow ice hockey.

Based on revenue, the major professional sports leagues in the United States comprise the following: Major League Baseball (MLB), the National Basketball Association (NBA), the National Football League (NFL), the National Hockey League (NHL), and Major League Soccer (MLS).

Just in the year 2024, the NFL generated over $23 billion, making them the most valued professional sports league in the United States and the world. With the addition of multiple TV/Streaming contracts that have been recently signed, the revenue is only expected to increase.

The market for professional sports in the United States is about $69 billion as of 2013, roughly 50% larger than that of all of Europe, the Middle East, and Africa combined. All these leagues enjoy wide-ranging domestic media coverage and, except for MLS, all are considered the preeminent leagues in their respective sports in the world. Although American football does not have a substantial following in other nations, the NFL does have the highest average attendance (67,254) of any professional sports league in the world. MLB has the second highest average attendance of any sports league in the United States (29,293), followed by MLS, the NBA, and the NHL. Of these five American-based leagues, all but the NFL have at least one team in Canada.

Professional teams in all major sports in the United States operate as franchises within a league, meaning that a team may move to a different city if the team's owners believe there would be a financial benefit, but franchise moves are usually subject to some form of league-level approval. All major sports leagues use a similar type of regular-season schedule with a post-season playoff tournament, instead of crowning as champions the team with the best won/loss record against all the other teams. Significantly, in all the major sports leagues in the United States (MLB, NBA, NFL, NHL, and MLS), the teams which set the best regular season record in the history of their respective leagues did not go on to win the championship, even as many low-seeded teams in the playoffs have in fact gone on to win the title. These are factors which are cited as adding to the excitement and relevance of the post-season, and justifying all teams' attempts throughout the regular season to at least qualify for the postseason even as wild cards.

In addition to the major league–level organizations, several sports also have professional minor leagues, active in smaller cities across the country. But as in Canada and Australia, sports leagues in the United States do not practice promotion and relegation, unlike most sports leagues in Europe.

Another notable distinction is that most sports fans in the United States tend to follow more than one team sport, depending on the time of year, unlike the case in many parts of the world where fans might avidly follow only one team sport such as soccer or baseball. Thus, it is possible for an American sports fan who follows multiple sports to spend practically every single day of the year watching professional sports, since there is no time of year when all the major professional leagues would be off-season.

Furthermore, sports are particularly associated with education in the United States, with most high schools and universities having organized sports, while college sports competitions play a very important role in the American sporting culture. In fact, college basketball and college football are more popular than professional sports in some parts of the country, a unique sporting feature in the United States. The major sanctioning body for college sports is the National Collegiate Athletic Association (NCAA). Colleges collectively receive billions of dollars from TV deals, sponsorships, and ticket sales. In 2019, the total revenue generated by NCAA athletic departments added up to $18.9 billion.

Based on the Olympic Games, world championships, and other major competitions in respective sports, the United States is the most successful nation in the world in baseball, basketball, athletics, swimming, lacrosse, beach volleyball, figure skating, tennis, golf, boxing, diving, shooting, rowing and snowboarding, and is one of the top five most successful nations in ice hockey, wrestling, gymnastics, volleyball, speed skating, alpine skiing, bobsleigh, equestrian, sailing, cycling, weightlifting and archery, among others. This makes the United States the most successful sports nation in the world. The United States has been referred to by some as "the hegemon of world sports". The United States has placed first in the Summer Olympic medal table 19 times out of 30 Summer Olympics and 29 appearances. Unlike most other nations, the United States government does not provide funding for sports nor for the United States Olympic & Paralympic Committee. The United States Olympic contingent is additionally the only Olympic contingent in the world to receive no government funding; neither training and development costs nor prize money are provided by the U.S. national government.

With recent American sporting achievements including winning the Summer Olympic medal table 4 straight times (2012, 2016, 2020 and 2024) and in 7 of the 8 Summer Olympics between 1996–2024, winning the 2015 and 2019 FIFA Women's World Cups and making the 2011 FIFA Women's World Cup final, making the semifinals in 8 of the 9 FIFA Women's World Cups, the finals in 5 of the 9 Women's World Cups, winning 4 of them, and winning 5 of the 8 women's Olympic soccer tournaments (where full teams compete), winning the last 5 straight men's Olympic basketball tournaments, from 2008–2024, and the last 8 straight women's Olympic basketball tournaments from 1996–2024, winning the men's and women's Olympic ice hockey gold medals in 2026, winning a record amount of gold medals (12) in the 2026 Winter Olympics, winning the 2018 women's Olympic ice hockey gold, as well as the 1996 World Cup of Hockey (a best on best tournament), winning the 2012, 2016 and 2020 women's Olympic water polo gold medals, winning the last 6 straight all-around gymnastic Olympic gold medals from 2004–2024, winning the most gold medals in swimming in each of the last 9 Summer Olympics (1992–present), winning the most gold medals in athletics in each of the last 11 Summer Olympics (1984–present), winning 11 of the 14 World Lacrosse Championships, winning the most all time Olympic gold medals in figure skating (19), including the 2026 team and women's singles gold medals, winning the most all time Olympic gold medals in snowboarding (17), and the most golds in 6 of the 7 Olympics it was held, winning 3 women's tennis Grand Slam singles titles since 2023 (2023 US Open, 2025 Australian Open, 2025 French Open), having a women's Grand Slam singles winner in 20 of the 29 years from 1998–2026, and making 2 of the last 3 US Open men's tennis finals (2024 and 2026), winning 27 of the last 39 men's major golf championships since 2017, while having a sizable portion of their athletic pool playing American football, there is a question about whether the United States is currently in a sporting golden age, or if American dominance in sports is the norm.

According to the American Time Use Survey, 23.4 percent of the civilian population age 15 and older participated in sports, exercise, or recreation on an average day in 2025. The rate was 25.7 percent for men and 21.1 percent for women, and participants spent an average of 1.47 hours on those activities on days when they participated.

== History ==
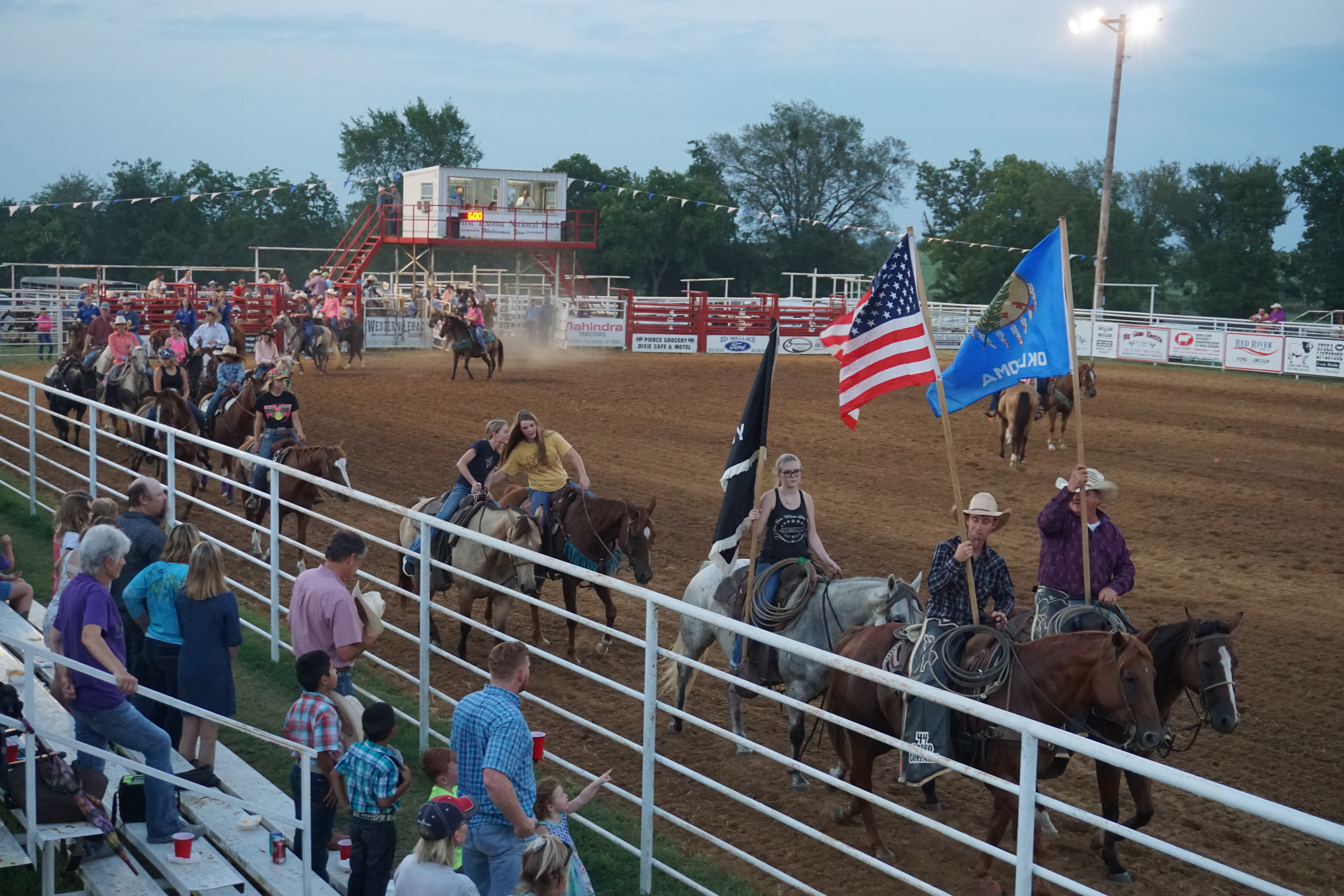
A Grand entry at the 2018 Boswell FFA Rodeo in Boswell, Oklahoma.

Lacrosse developed among the Indigenous peoples of the Eastern Woodlands and the Great Lakes region as far back as 1100 AD, making it the first sport played on the American continent. American football, arena football, baseball, softball, and indoor soccer evolved out of older British (Rugby football, British baseball, rounders, and association football) sports. Basketball, volleyball, beach volleyball, racquetball, pickleball, skateboarding, snowboarding, ultimate, windsurfing, and water skiing are fully American inventions, some of which have become popular in other countries and worldwide.

Up until the American Civil War, cricket was a somewhat popular sport in the United States, with presidents such as George Washington and Abraham Lincoln having played or watched the game. However, cricket at the time was a sport played over several days, and during the Civil War, troops preferred to play the newly rising game of baseball, which was much shorter in duration and did not require a special playing surface to be played.

== Olympics ==
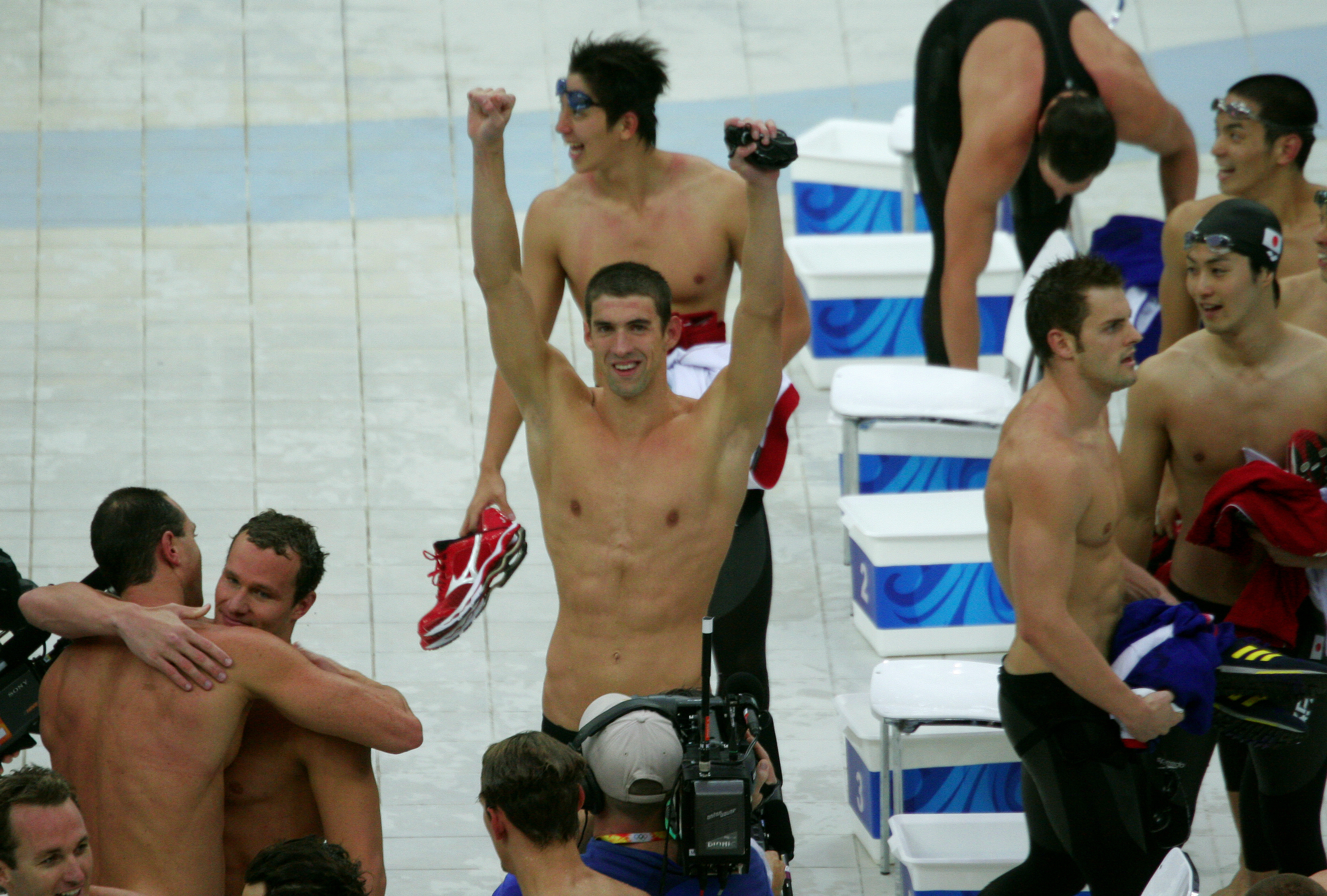
Michael Phelps celebrates after winning his eighth gold medal in the 2008 Summer Olympics

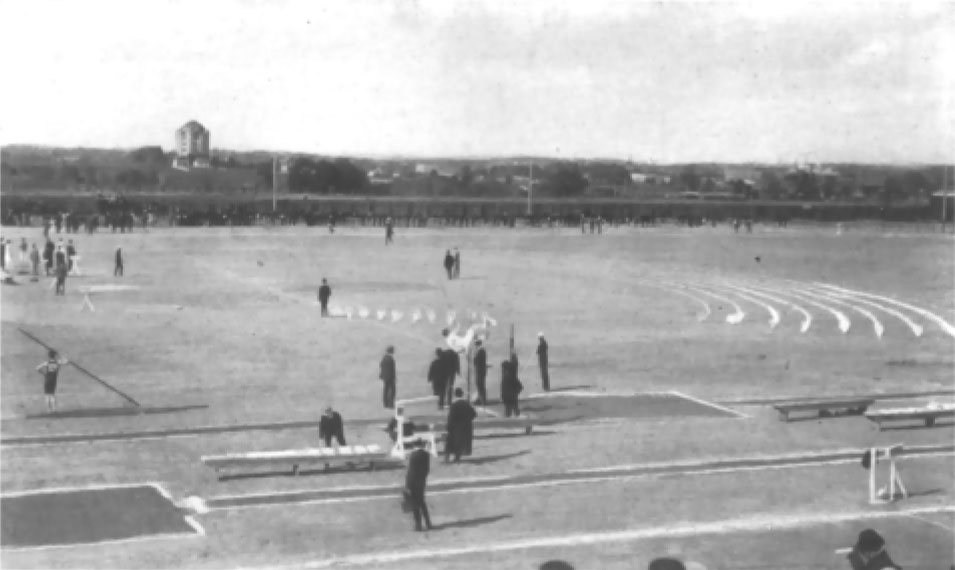
Francis Olympic Field of Washington University in St. Louis, site of the 1904 Olympic Games

American athletes have won a total of 2,764 medals (1,105 of them gold) at the Summer Olympic Games and another 330 (114 of them gold) at the Winter Olympic Games, making the United States the most prolific medal-winning nation in the history of the Olympics. The U.S. is ranked first in the all-time medal table even if all the incarnations of Russia and Germany are combined, leading the second-placed Russians by 430 gold and 957 total medals. These achievements are even more impressive considering the fact that the American Olympic team remains the only in the world to receive no government funding.

The United States hosted both Summer and Winter Games in 1932, and has hosted more Games than any other country – eight times, four times each for the Summer and Winter Games:

- The 1904 Summer Olympics in St. Louis, 1932 Summer Olympics and 1984 Summer Olympics in Los Angeles; and the 1996 Summer Olympics in Atlanta;
- The 1932 Winter Olympics and 1980 Winter Olympics in Lake Placid, New York; the 1960 Winter Olympics in Squaw Valley, California; and the 2002 Winter Olympics in Salt Lake City, Utah.

Los Angeles will host the Summer Olympics for a third time in 2028. Salt Lake City will host the Winter Olympics for a second time in 2034, marking the tenth Olympics hosted in the United States.

The United States has won the most gold and overall medals in the Summer Olympic Games, even if the medal totals of the Soviet Union/CIS and Russia are combined, and has topped the medal table 19 times. The country has won the second most gold and overall medals in the Winter Olympic Games, behind Norway, but has topped the medal table only one time, in 1932. If all of Germany's and Russia's incarnations are combined, the United States slips to fourth in the all-time Winter Olympic Games table.

== Individual sports ==
=== Golf ===
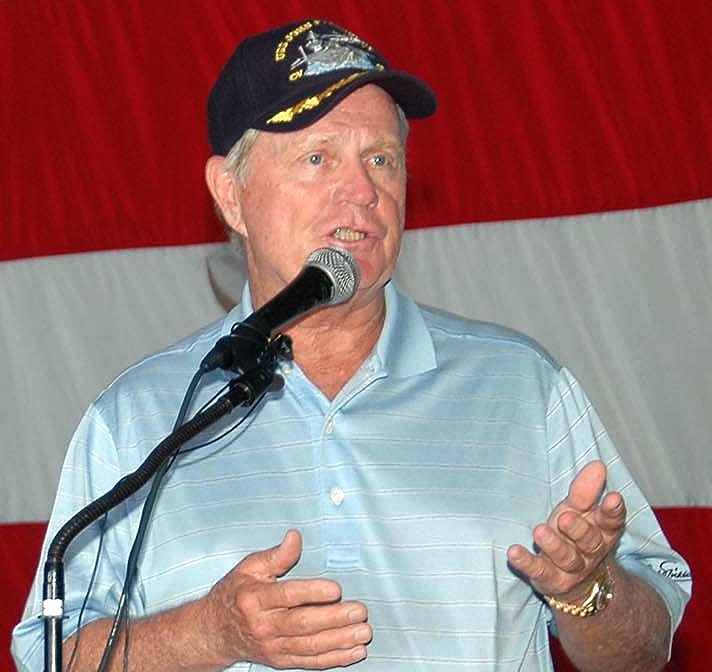
Jack Nicklaus is widely regarded as the greatest golfer of all time, winning a total of 18 career major championships.

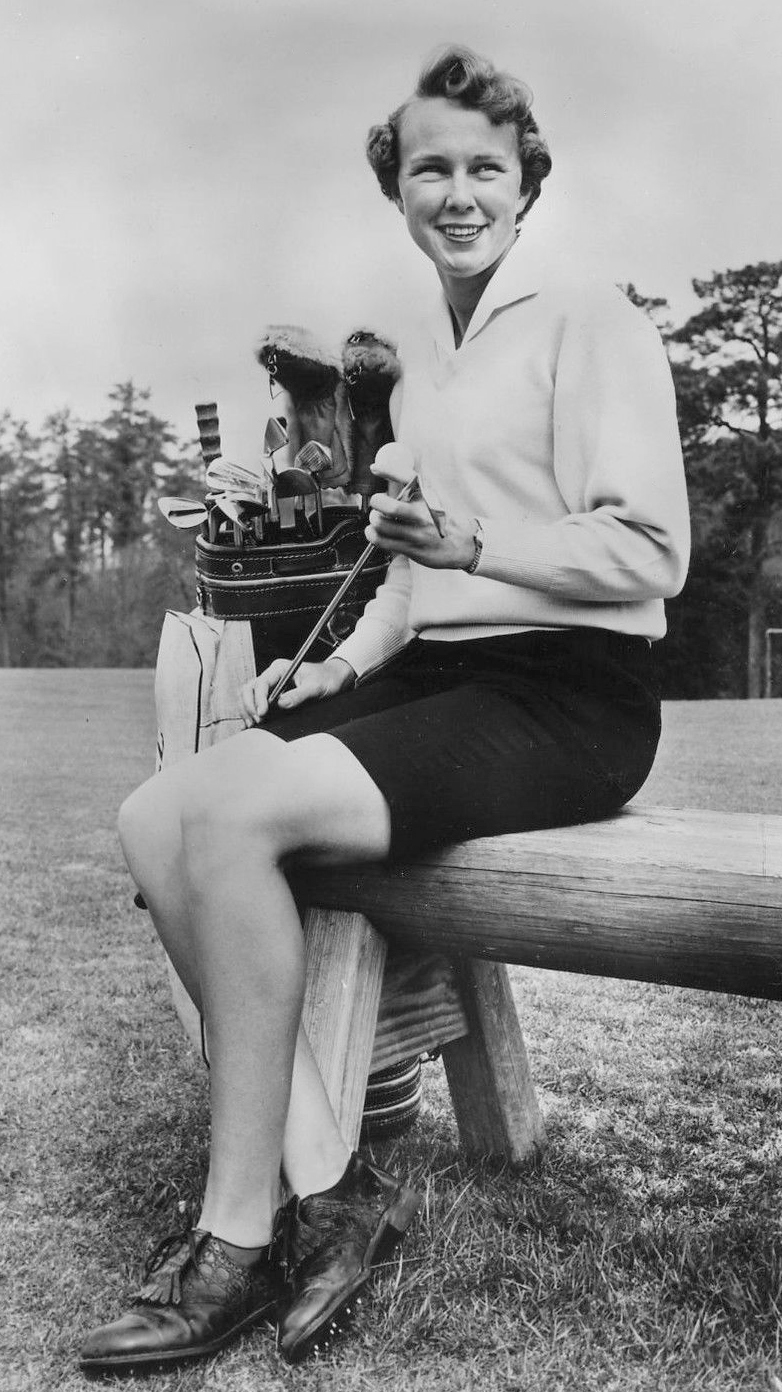
Mickey Wright, often regarded as one of the most dominant players in the history of women's golf

Golf is one of the most popular participation sports in the United States, with approximately 24 million people playing golf on a regular basis as of 2023. Golf's origins can be traced back to 15th century Scotland, where players would hit a pebble around sandy dunes using a stick or primitive club. The game has evolved over centuries into the version played today, which involves hitting a small, dimpled ball into each hole on a course in as few strokes as possible.

Introduced to America in the late 19th century, it quickly gained favor among the upper class. The United States Golf Association was founded in 1894 to establish rules. Iconic courses like Augusta National and Pebble Beach have hosted legendary tournaments.

Since the 1970s, the landscape of golf in the United States has seen significant advancements, particularly in the recognition of female players. This has been highlighted by increased support for women's golf programs, the expansion of women's tournaments, and greater representation of female golfers at all levels of the sport.

In 2020, nearly 25 million people or around 8% of the total population of the U.S., played golf on a golf course in the United States, according to the National Golf Foundation.

=== Boxing ===
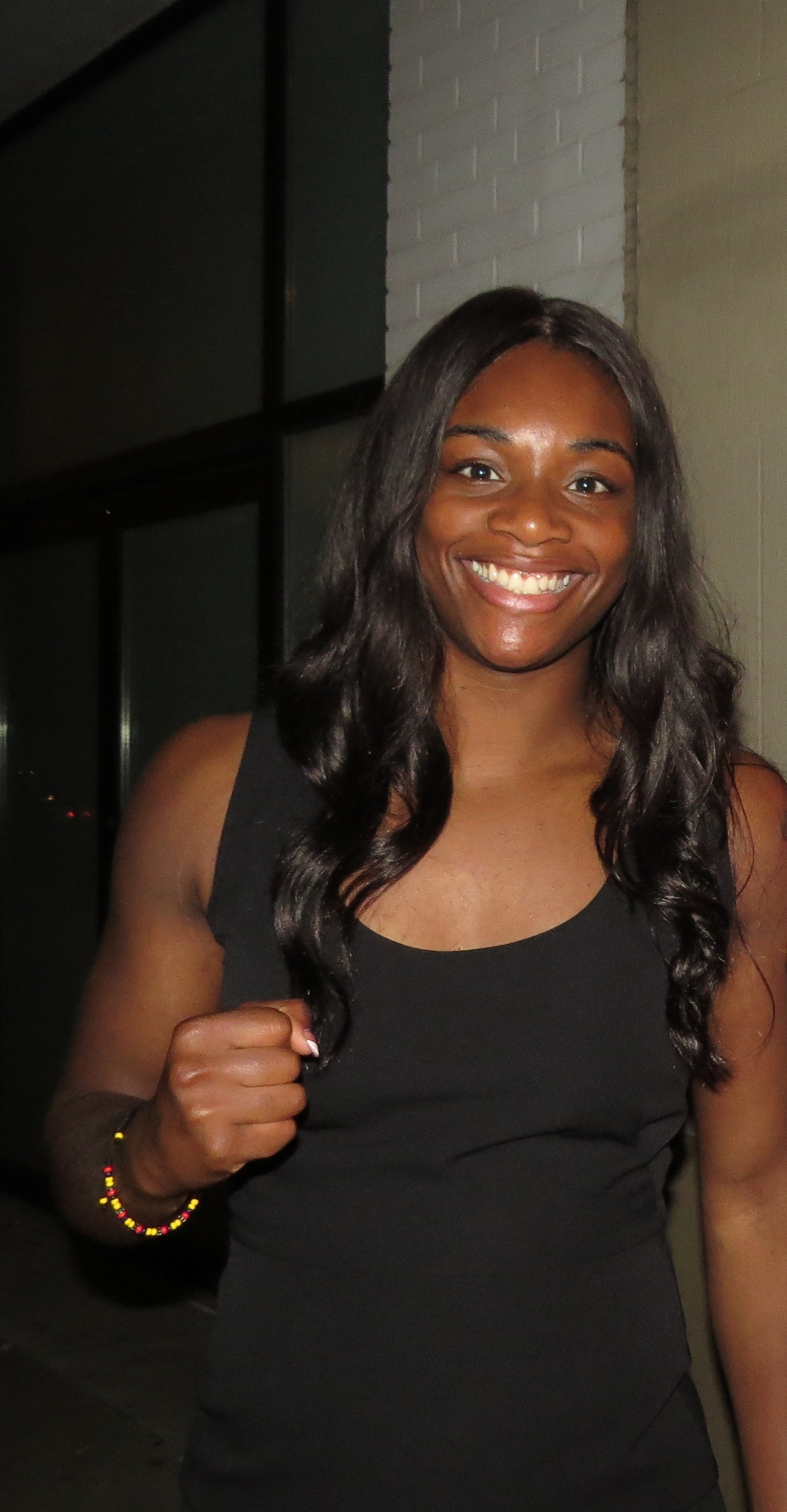
Claressa Shields, professional boxer and professional mixed martial artist.

The United States became the center of professional boxing in the early 20th century. The National Boxing Association was founded in 1921 and began to sanction title fights. Joe Louis was an American professional boxer who competed from 1934 to 1951. He reigned as the world heavyweight champion from 1937 to 1949, and is widely considered to be one of the greatest heavyweight boxers of all-time. Louis is widely regarded as the first person of African-American descent to achieve the status of a nationwide hero within the United States, and was also a focal point of anti-Nazi sentiment leading up to and during World War II. Since the late 1990s, boxing has declined in popularity.

As of 2021, boxing participation in the United States reached approximately 6.7 million people, indicating a robust growth in the sport's popularity.

== Popular team sports ==
=== Overview ===
The most popular team sports in the United States are American football, baseball, basketball, ice hockey, and soccer. All five of these team sports are popular with fans, are widely watched on television, have a fully professional league, are played by millions of Americans, enjoy varsity status at many NCAA Division I universities, and are played in high schools throughout the country.

Location of the franchises (teams) of the major professional leagues in the United States and Canada.

Sport	Favorite spectator sport	TV viewing record (since 2010)^{1}	Major professional league	Participants (millions)	NCAA DI Teams (men + women)	States (HS)^{2}
Football	41%	127.7 million	NFL	8.9 million	249 (249M + 0W)	51
Baseball	10%	40.0 million	MLB	11.5 million	589 (298M + 291W)	49
Basketball	9%	30.8 million	NBA	24.4 million	698 (351M + 349W)	51
Soccer	5%	29.3 million	MLS	13.6 million	531 (205M + 332W)	51
Ice hockey	4%	43.6 million	NHL	3.1 million	102 (61M + 41W)	20

1. TV viewing record measures the game with the most TV viewers in the U.S. since 2005 for each sport: 2025 Super Bowl, 2016 NBA Finals Game 7, 2016 World Series Game 7, 2014 FIFA World Cup Final, and 2010 Winter Olympics Gold medal ice hockey game.
2. The column titled "States (HS)" represents the number of states that sponsor the sport at the high school level. For the purpose of this table, Washington, D.C. is counted as a state.

=== American football ===
Football has the most participants of any sport at both high school and college levels, the vast majority of its participants being male. Millions watch college football throughout the fall months, and some communities, particularly in rural areas, place great emphasis on their local high school football teams. The popularity of college and high school football in areas such as the Southern United States (Southeastern Conference) and the Great Plains (Big 12 Conference and Big Ten Conference) stems largely from the fact that these areas historically generally did not possess markets large enough for a professional team. Nonetheless, college football has a rich history in the United States, predating the NFL by decades, and fans and alumni are generally very passionate about their teams.

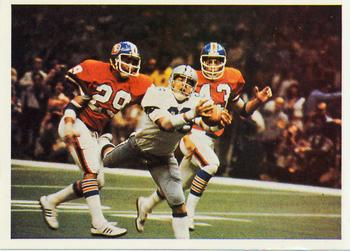
The Dallas Cowboys playing against the Broncos in Super Bowl XII.

The National Football League (NFL) has the highest average attendance (67,591) of any professional sports league in the world and has the highest revenue out of any single professional sports league. The NFL has two conferences, the AFC and the NFC. The AFC has 4 divisions (AFC East, AFC North, AFC South, and AFC West). The NFC also has 4 divisions (NFC East, NFC North, NFC South, and NFC West.) Each division has 4 teams, with a total of 32 teams in the NFL.

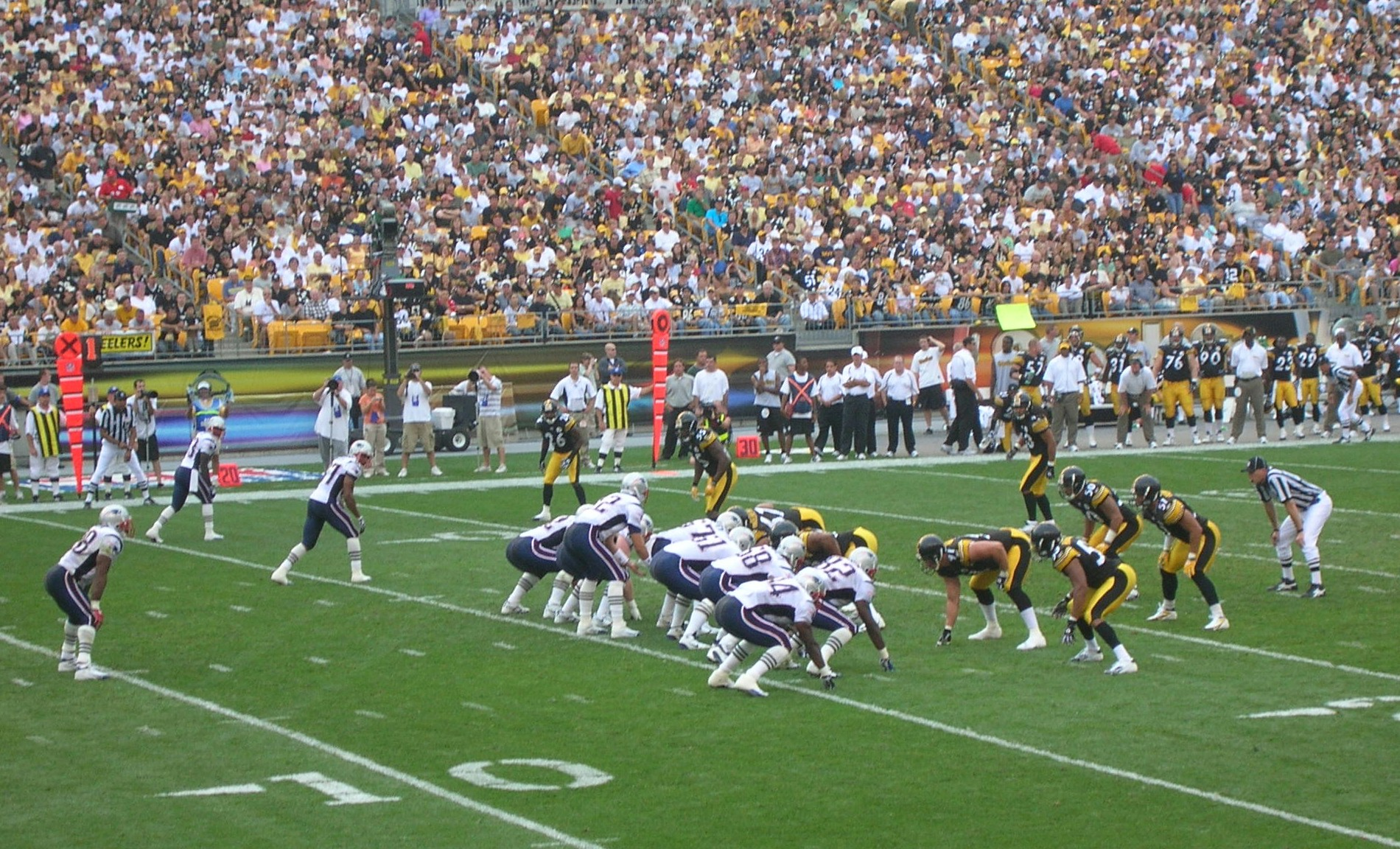
The NFL's New England Patriots vs. the Pittsburgh Steelers.

=== Basketball ===
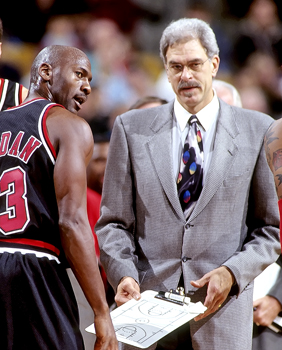
Chicago Bulls Michael Jordan and Phil Jackson 1997

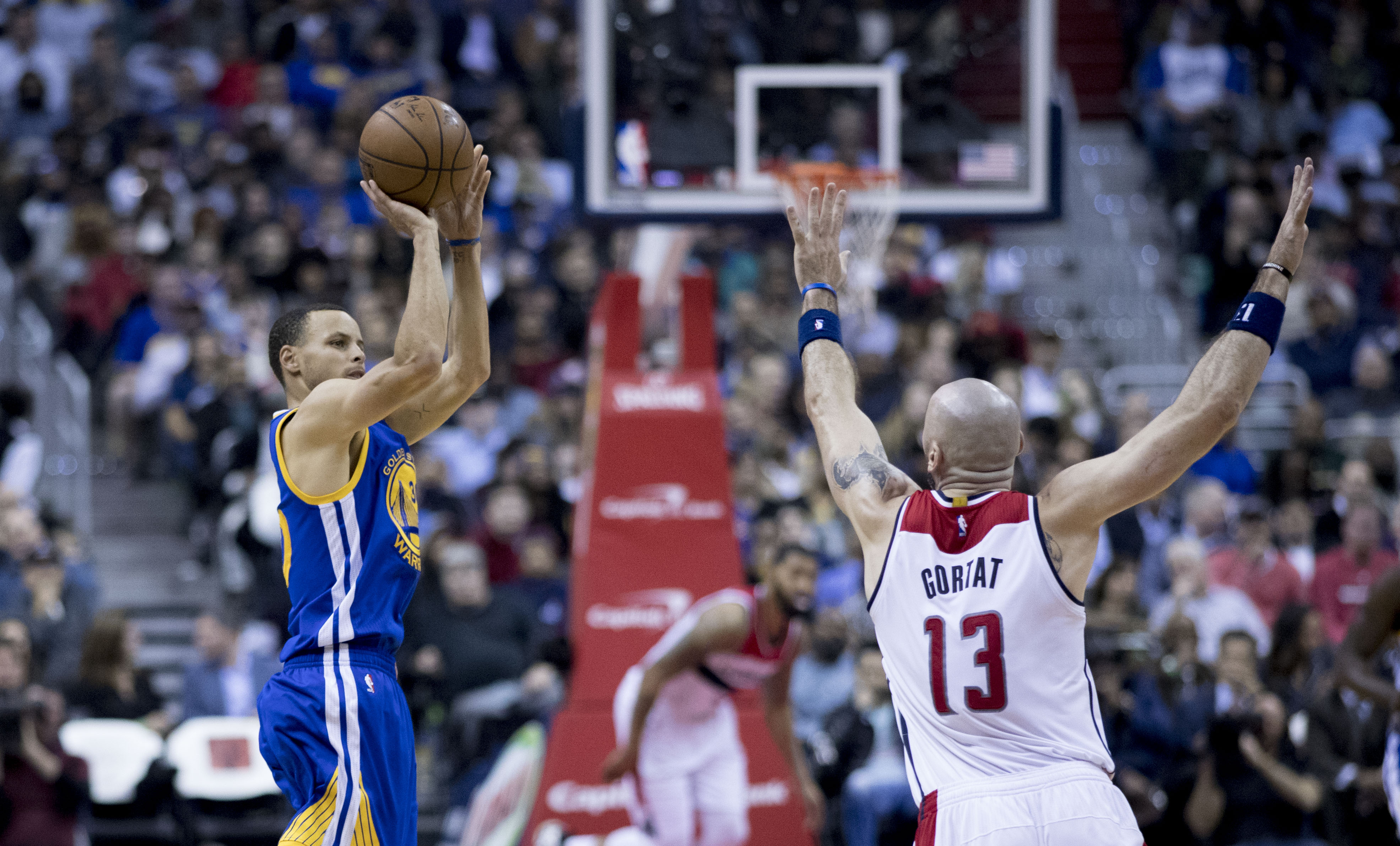
Many players and analysts have called Stephen Curry the greatest shooter in NBA history.

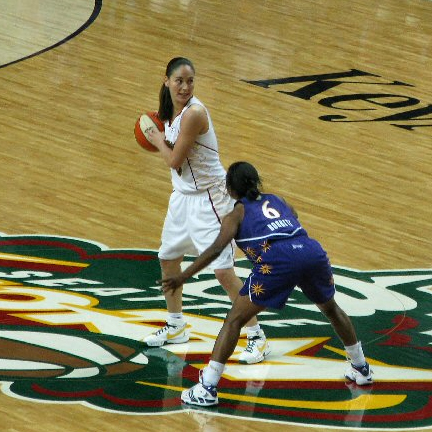
Sue Bird, a member of the All-Decade and Top 15 teams from the WNBA.

In high school basketball, Indiana has 10 of the 12 largest high school gyms in the United States, and is famous for its basketball passion, known as "Hoosier hysteria".

Of those Americans citing their favorite sport, basketball is ranked second (counting amateur levels) behind football. However, in regards to revenue the NBA is ranked third in popularity. More Americans play basketball than any other team sport, according to the National Sporting Goods Association, with over 26 million Americans playing basketball. Basketball was invented in 1891 by Canadian physical education teacher James Naismith in Springfield, Massachusetts.

The National Basketball Association (NBA) is the world's premier professional basketball league and one of the major professional sports leagues of North America. It contains 30 teams (29 teams in the U.S. and 1 in Canada) that play an 82-game season from October to June. After the regular season, eight teams from each conference compete in the playoffs for the Larry O'Brien Championship Trophy. Professional basketball is most followed in cities where there are no other sports teams in the four major professional leagues, such as in the case of the Oklahoma City Thunder, the Sacramento Kings, the San Antonio Spurs, the Memphis Grizzlies, or the Portland Trail Blazers.

The Women's National Basketball Association (WNBA) is the main professional women's basketball league in the United States. It consists of 12 teams and runs from May to September. Notable players include Diana Taurasi, Sue Bird, Lisa Leslie, and Maya Moore. Although historically lower-paying than the NBA, the WNBA has seen improvements in player salaries and sponsorships in recent years; particularly with the arrival of Caitlin Clark in the WNBA in 2024; Clark's arrival brought with her a "Caitlin Clark effect" of a large fanbase that substantially increased ticket sales and television viewership compared to the league's baseline.

=== Baseball ===
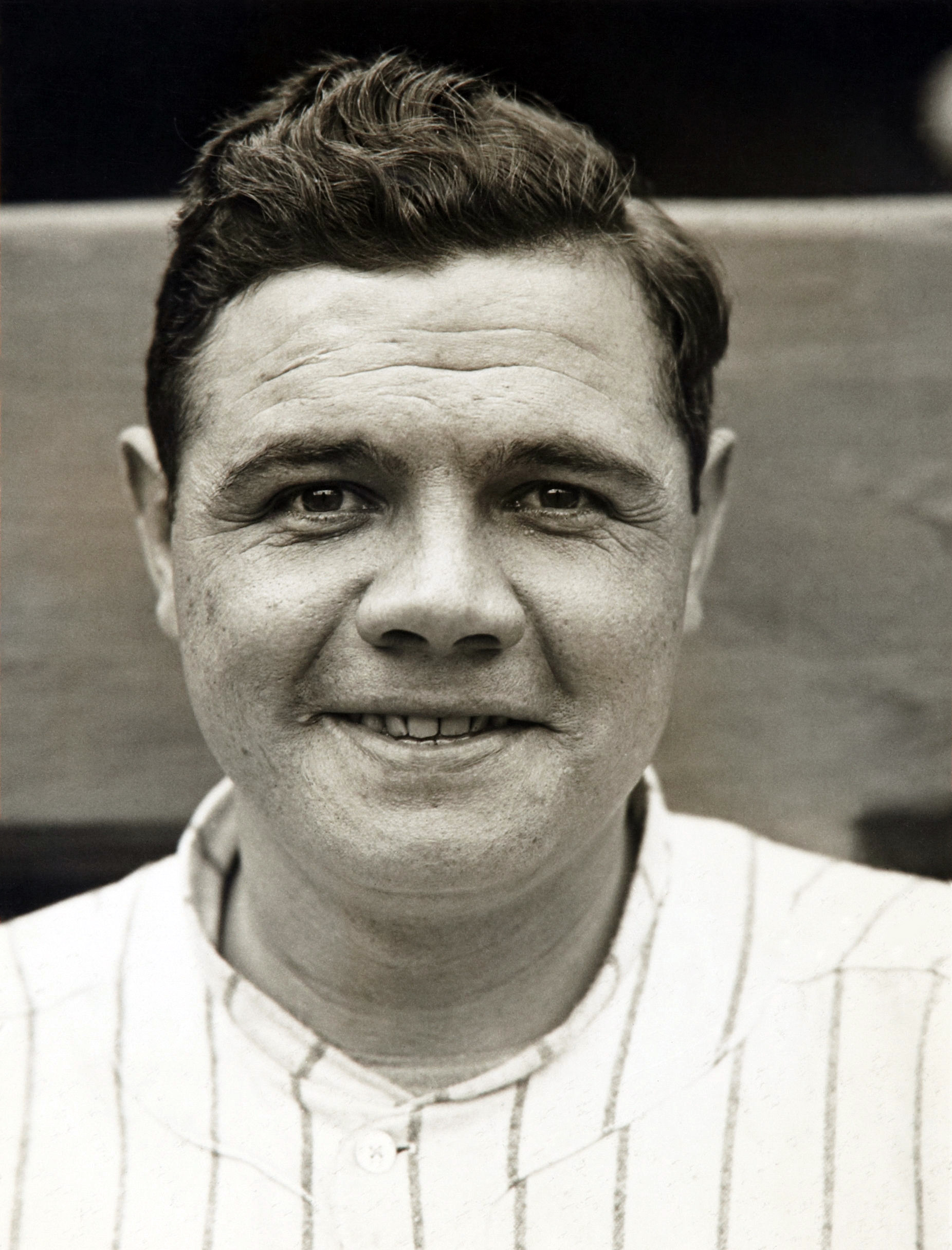
Babe Ruth, circa 1920. He achieved his greatest fame as a home run batter for the New York Yankees

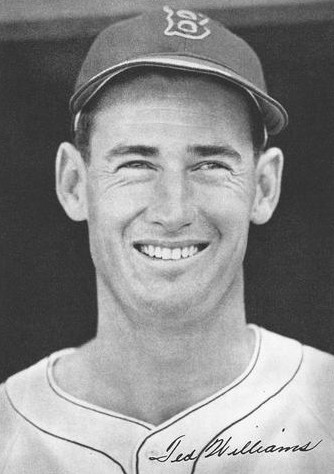
Ted Williams, widely considered one of the greatest hitters in baseball history

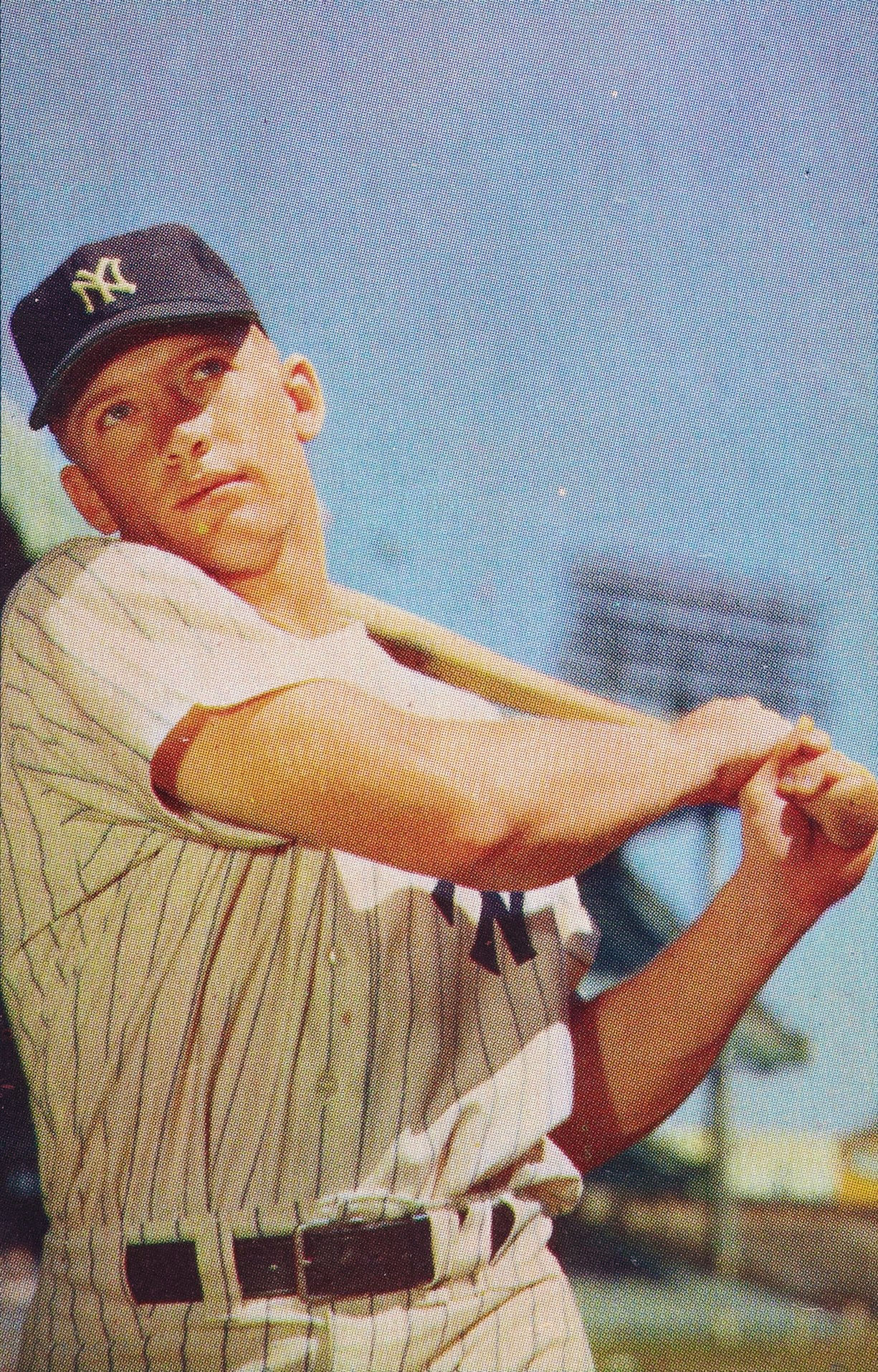
Mickey Mantle, New York Yankees centerfielder, in 1953.

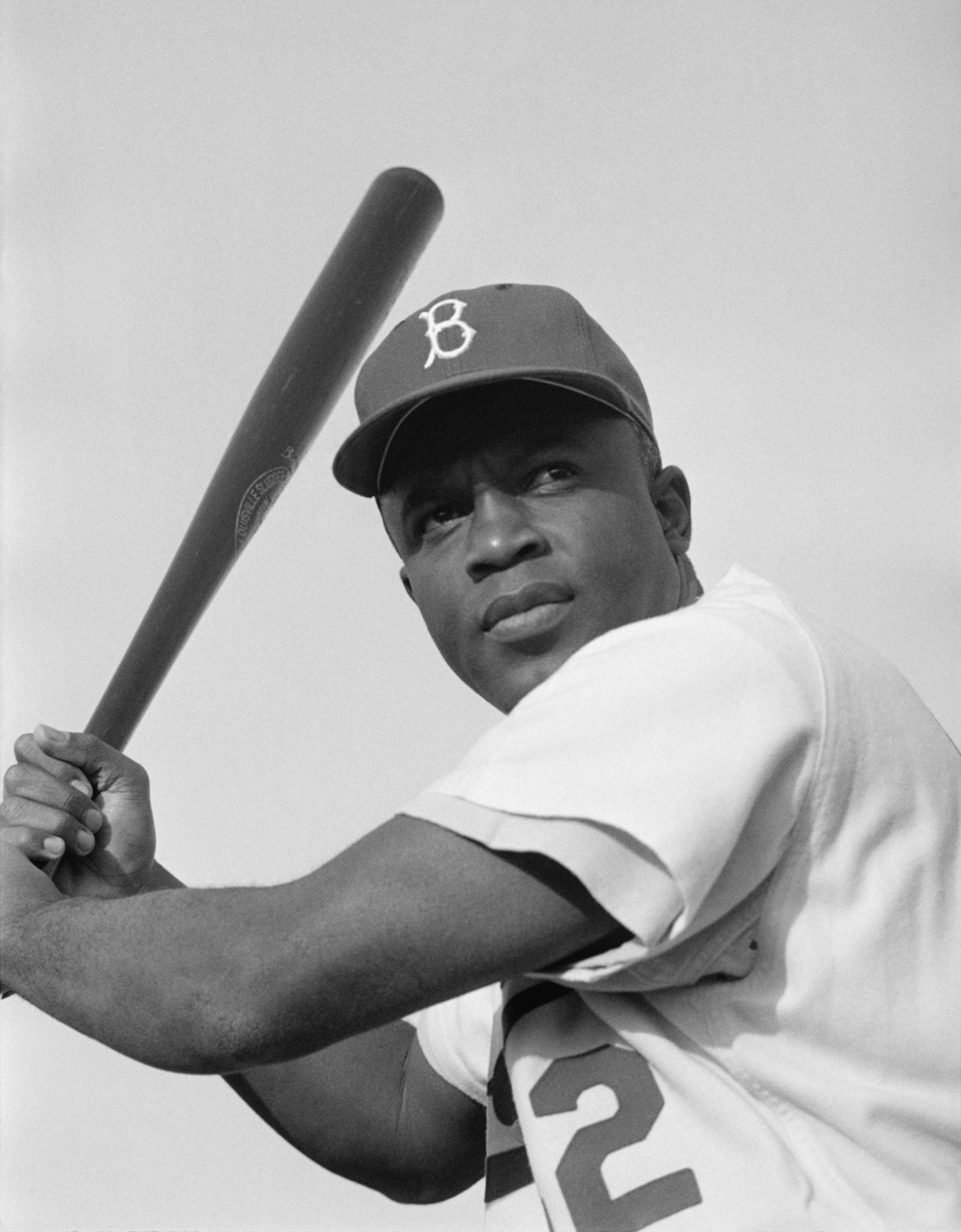
Jackie Robinson became the first African American to play in Major League Baseball (MLB) in the modern era.

Baseball and a variant, softball, are popular participatory sports in the U.S. Baseball was the first professional sport in the United States. The highest level of baseball in the U.S. and the world is Major League Baseball (MLB). There are a total of 30 MLB teams. The World Series of Major League Baseball is the culmination of the sport's postseason each October. It is played between the winner of each of the two leagues, the American League and the National League, and the winner is determined through a best-of-seven playoff.

With 27 World Series, the New York Yankees have won more titles than any other U.S. major professional sports franchise. The Yankees' chief rivals, the Boston Red Sox, also enjoy a following in Boston and throughout New England. The Philadelphia Phillies of the National League are the oldest continuous, one-name, one-city franchise in all of professional American sports, and have a fanbase throughout Philadelphia and the Delaware Valley, dubbed as the "Meanest Fans in America".

Every four years in March, the World Baseball Classic is held, which is the most prestigious international baseball competition.

=== Soccer ===
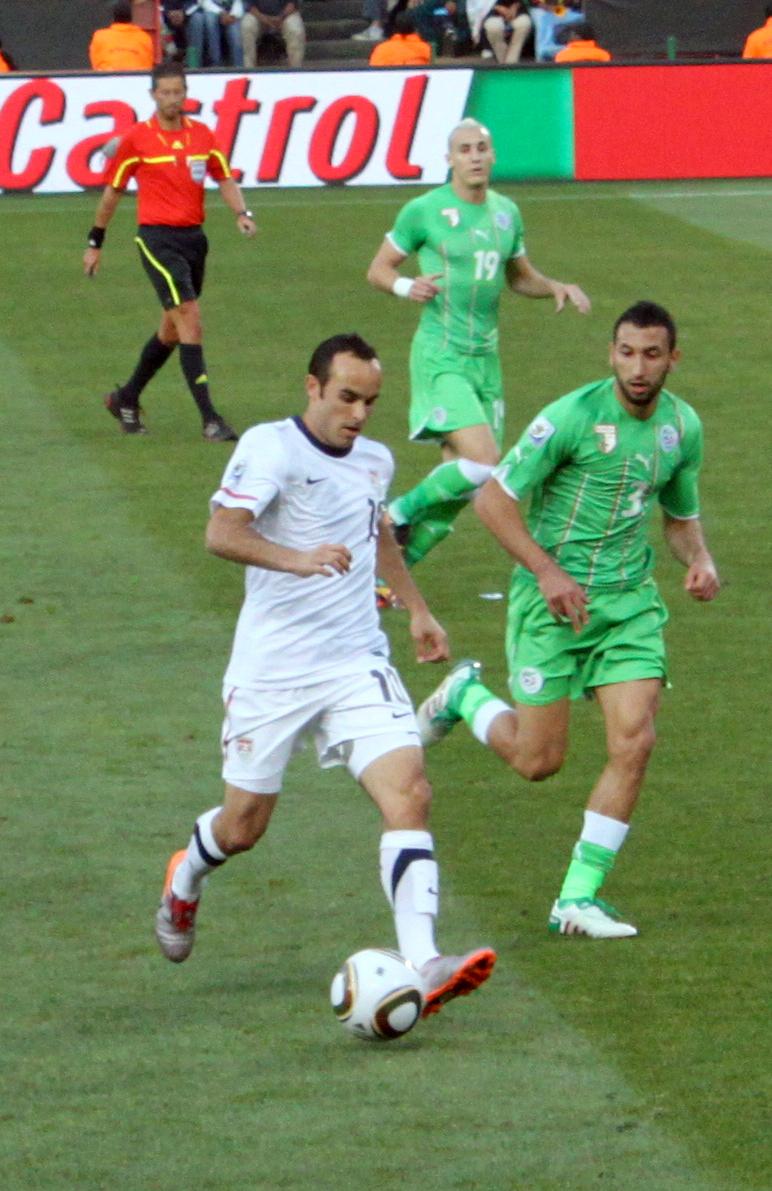
Landon Donovan representing the U.S. at the 2010 World Cup.

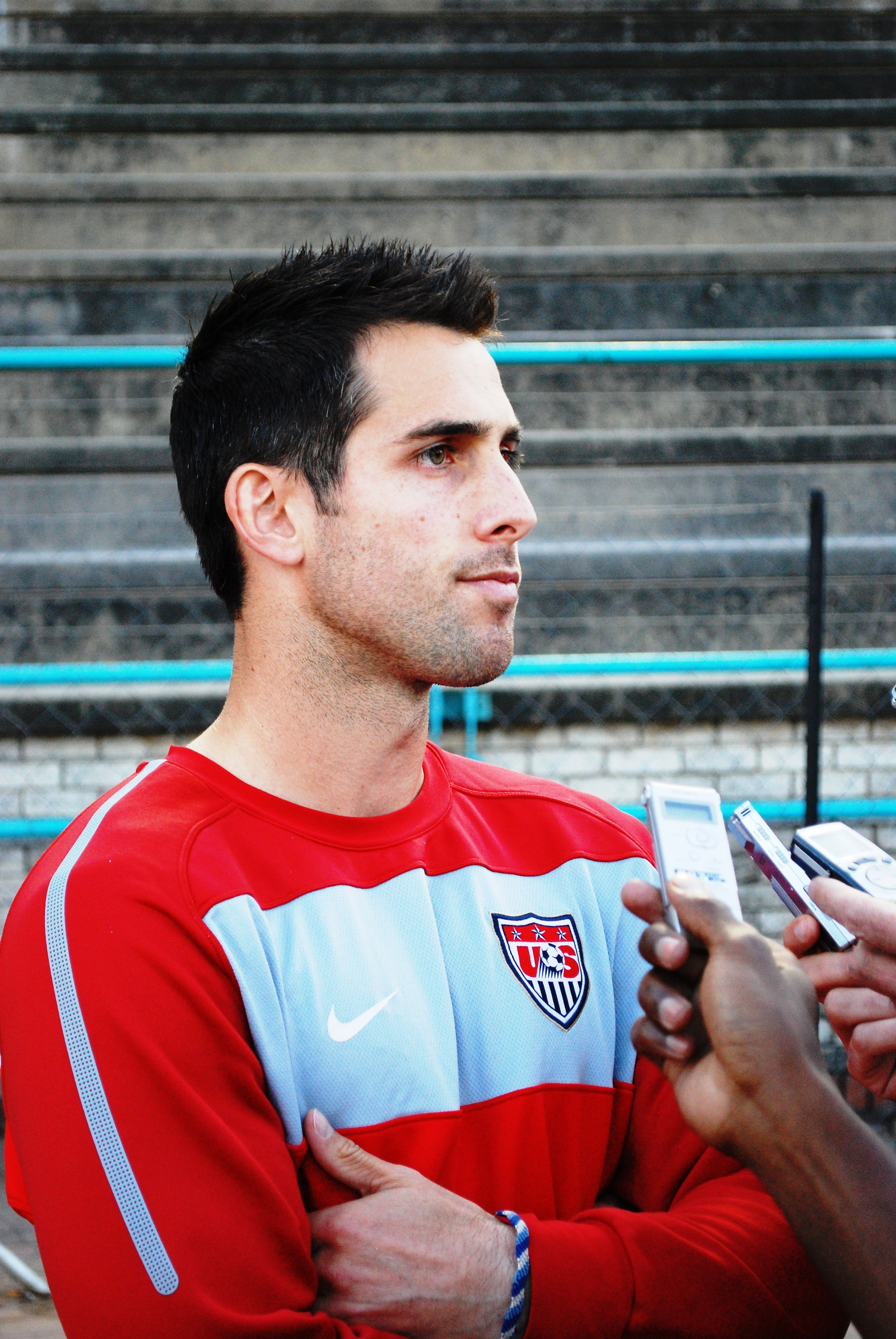
Carlos Bocanegra with the United States men's national soccer team in 2010.

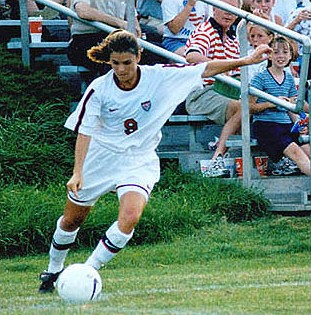
Mia Hamm takes a corner kick

With an average attendance of over 21,000 per game (prior to COVID-19), Major League Soccer has the third-highest average attendance of any sports league in the U.S. after the National Football League (NFL) and Major League Baseball (MLB), and is the ninth-highest attended professional soccer league worldwide.

The NWSL most recently expanded to 14 teams in 2024 and is expected to add a 15th team in 2026.

In 2024, the NWSL received competition as a top-level league with the launch of the USL Super League (USLS), which started play with 8 teams. Shortly before its first season, USLS received Division I sanctioning from the U.S. Soccer Federation, placing it at the same level as the NWSL. Unlike most U.S. soccer leagues, USLS is playing a fall-to-spring season, in line with most European leagues and the sport's international calendar.

The Major Arena Soccer League (MASL) is a North American professional indoor soccer league. MASL is the highest level of arena soccer in North America and the world.

In 2026, soccer was reported as America's third favorite sport.

=== Ice hockey ===
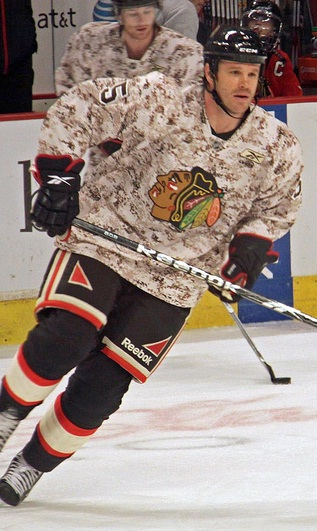
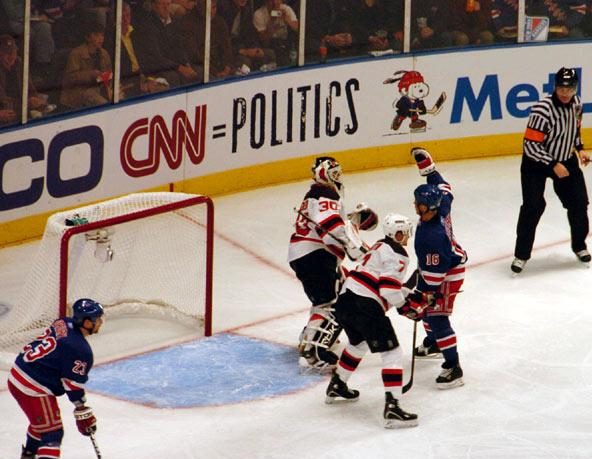
Left: The Blackhawks have donned Camouflage practice jerseys for Veterans Day to show support for servicemen since 2009.
Right: The New York Rangers attempt to distract during the 2008 Stanley Cup playoffs. The playoff series was the fifth to feature the Devils–Rangers rivalry.

The U.S. now has more youth hockey players than all other countries, excluding Canada, combined. USA Hockey is the official governing body for organized ice hockey in the United States. The United States Hockey Hall of Fame is located in Eveleth, Minnesota.

The U.S.-based National Hockey League is the premier hockey league in the world. Historically, the vast majority of NHL players had come from Canada, with a small number of Americans. As late as 1969–70, Canadian players made up 95 percent of the league.

However, the modern NHL has a much larger percentage of American players. At the start of the 2023–24 NHL season, American players made up 29.1 percent of the league, compared to 41.7 percent from Canada and 29.2 percent from various European countries.

=== Calendar of the major men's and women's professional sports leagues in the U.S. ===
January	February	March	April	May	June	July	August	September	October	November	December
NFL (Football)								NFL (Football)			
		MLB (Baseball)									
NBA (Basketball)									NBA (Basketball)		
	MLS (Soccer) (Note: League schedule valid only for the year 2026. On November 13, 2025, MLS announced that it will transition to a summer-to-spring schedule, beginning in 2027. The regular season will begin in mid-July, a winter break will take place from mid-December to early or mid-February, and the MLS Cup playoffs will occur in May. As part of the transition process, the league will play an abbreviated 2027 season in early 2027, followed by the 2027–28 season in July.)										
NHL (Ice hockey)									NHL (Ice hockey)		

January	February	March	April	May	June	July	August	September	October	November	December
				WNBA (Basketball)							
		NWSL (Soccer)									
					AUSL (Softball)						
PWHL (Ice hockey)											PWHL (Ice hockey)

=== Current American Champions (Major Professional Team Sports) ===
Sport	Champion
Baseball	Milwaukee Brewers
Basketball (Men's)	New York Knicks
Basketball (Women's)	Golden State Valkyries
Football	Seattle Seahawks
Ice Hockey (Men's)	Carolina Hurricanes
Ice Hockey (Women's)	Montreal Victoire
Soccer (Men's)	Inter Miami
Soccer (Women's)	Kansas City Current
Softball	Utah Talons

== Other team sports ==
=== Overview ===
The following table shows additional sports that are played by over 500,000 people in the United States.

Sport	Participants (millions)	NCAA teams (men + women)	Pro league(s)	Attendance record^{1}	TV Viewership record^{2}	Olympic sport
Volleyball	10.7 million	1,122 (155M + 1,067W)	LOVB; MLV	92,003	794,000	Yes
Rugby union	1.4 million	over 600 (go to college rugby)	MLR	61,500	9,000,000	Yes
Lacrosse	0.7 million	921 (397M + 524W)	NLL; PLL; WLL	52,004	476,000	Yes

1. Attendance record measures highest single-game attendances. Attendance records are: Volleyball: 2023 Volleyball Day in Nebraska at Memorial Stadium, Lincoln; Rugby: 2014 New Zealand vs. Ireland in Chicago; and Lacrosse: 2007 NCAA Division I men's championship semifinals.
2. TV viewership records are: Volleyball: 2010 NCAA women's championship on ESPN2; Rugby: 2018 Rugby World Cup Sevens on NBC; Lacrosse: 2016 NCAA championship on ESPN2

=== Lacrosse ===
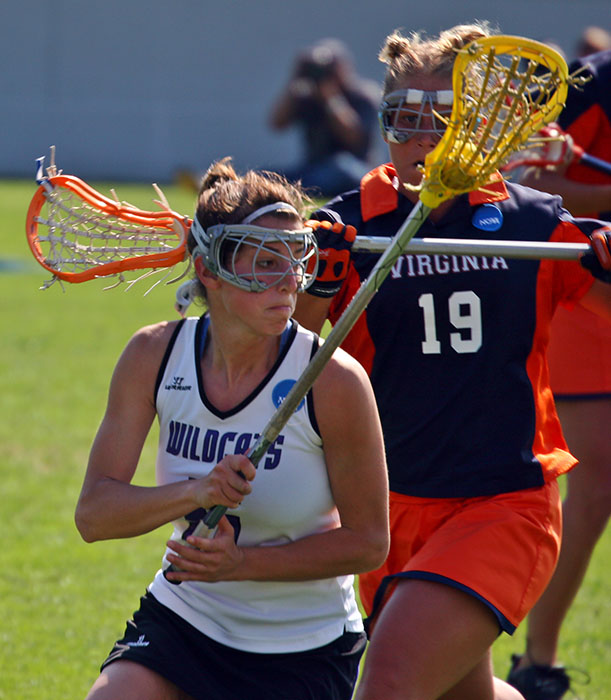
Women playing lacrosse.

Lacrosse is a team sport that is believed to have originated with the Iroquois and the Lenape. The sport is most popular in the East Coast area from Maryland to New York. While its roots remain east, lacrosse is currently the fastest growing sport in the nation. The National Lacrosse League is the professional box lacrosse league, while the Premier Lacrosse League is the professional field lacrosse league. Major League Lacrosse was a semi-professional field lacrosse league that was operating nationally before merging into PLL in 2020.

=== Volleyball ===
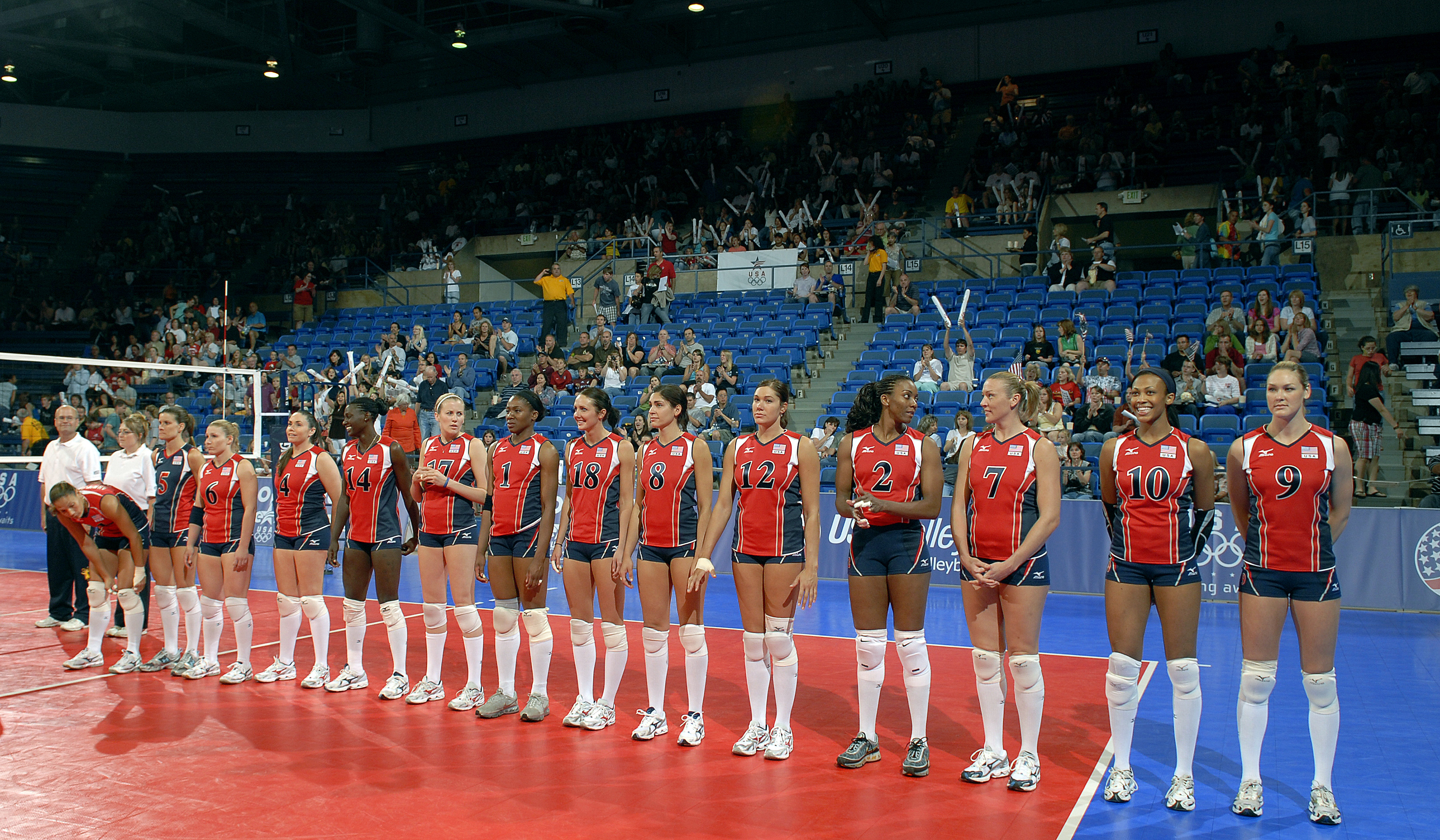
The U.S. Women's Volleyball team in 2008.

Volleyball is played in the United States, especially at the college and university levels. Unlike most Olympic sports which are sponsored widely at the collegiate level for both sexes, the women's college volleyball teams are more common than men's college volleyball teams. In the 2011–12 school year, over 300 schools in NCAA Division I alone (the highest of three NCAA tiers) sponsored women's volleyball at the varsity level, while fewer than 100 schools in all three NCAA divisions combined sponsored varsity men's volleyball, with only 23 of them in Division I. Men's volleyball has grown at the non-scholarship NCAA Division III level in the 21st century, with a national championship established in 2012. As of the most recent 2022 season (2021–22 school year), 113 schools sponsor the sport at that level. At the same time, 26 D-I and 31 D-II members sponsored men's volleyball at the National Collegiate level, defined for the purposes of that sport as the combination of Divisions I and II. (Note: The NCAA officially labels all championship events that are open to members of more than one NCAA division as "National Collegiate" championships. The only exception to this rule is in men's ice hockey, whose championship event remains branded as the "Division I" championship because the NCAA formerly sponsored a D-II championship in that sport.) The National Volleyball Association is the professional men's volleyball league, while the Pro Volleyball Federation is the professional women's volleyball league.

=== Rugby union ===
A scrum showing the body positions of the forwards, as well as both scrum-halves and the referee.

Rugby union participation in the U.S. has grown significantly in recent years, growing by 350% between 2004 and 2011. A 2010 survey by the National Sporting Goods Manufacturers Association ranked rugby union as the fastest-growing sport in the U.S.

Rugby union is the fastest growing college sport and sport in general in the United States.

=== Minor sports ===
- Australian rules football in the United States
- Bandy in the United States
- Cricket in the United States
- Field hockey in the United States
- Handball in the United States
- Rugby league in the United States

== Organization of American sports ==
=== College sports ===
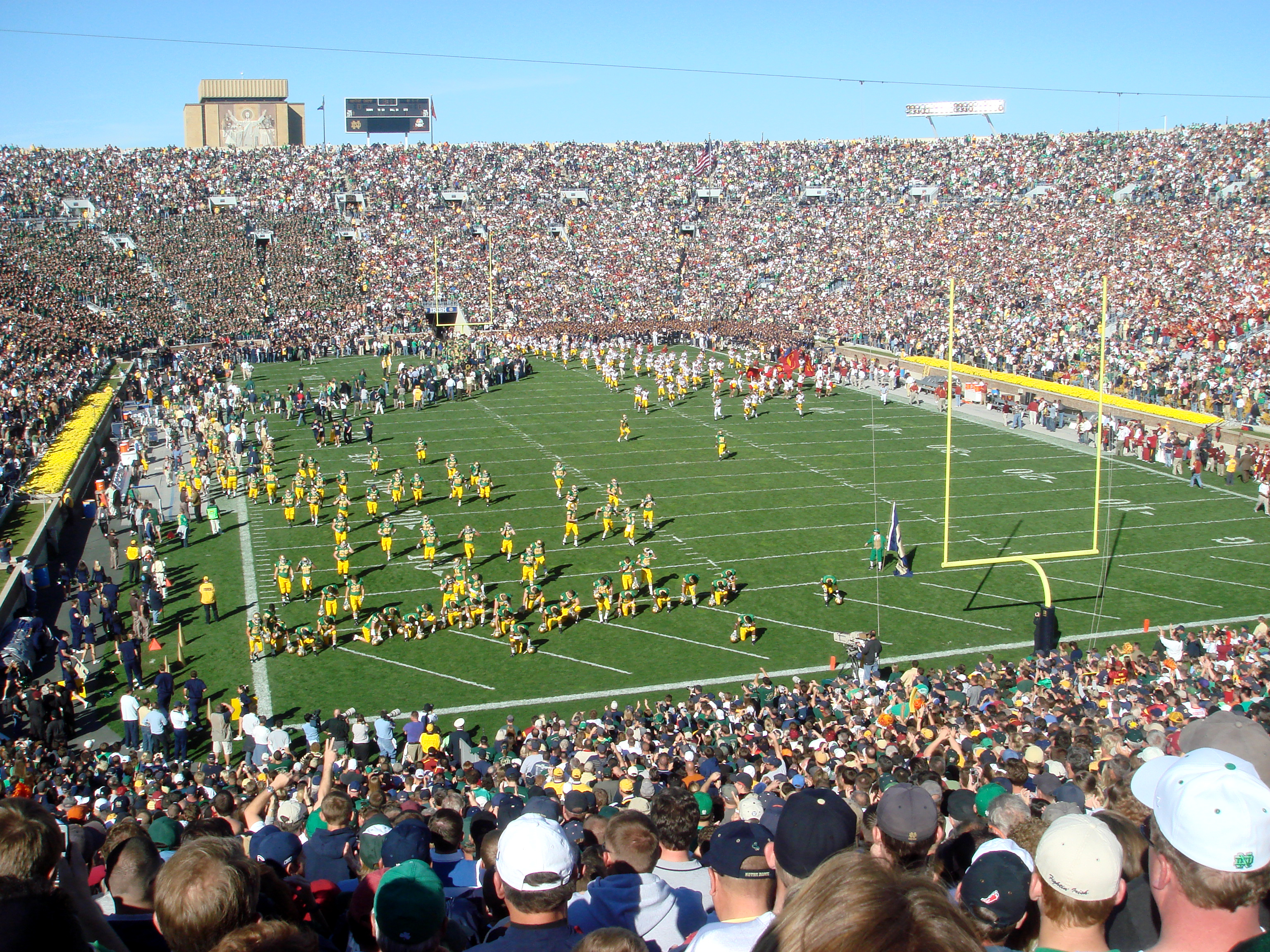
University of Notre Dame and University of Southern California take the field in the 79th edition of the rivalry.

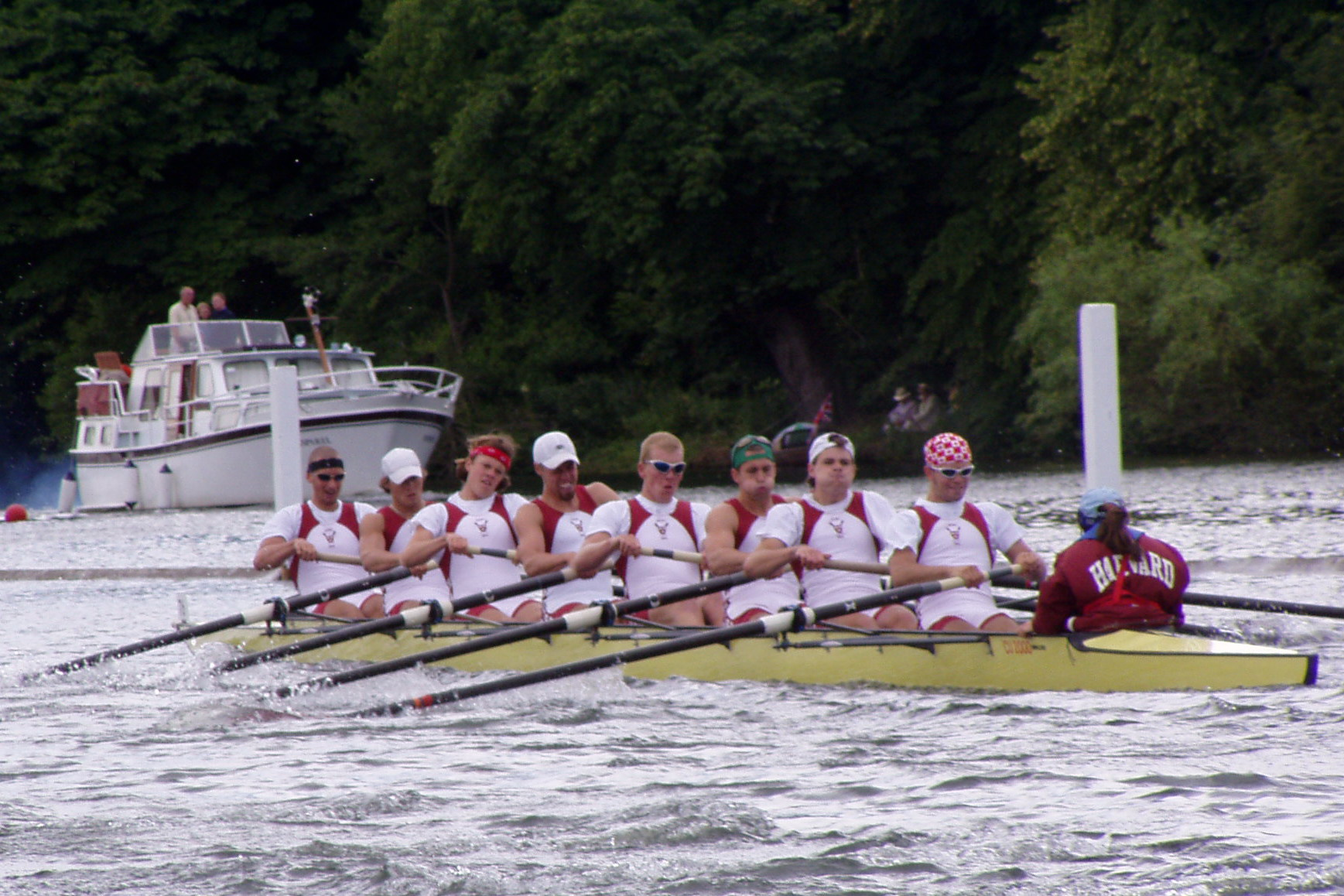
Harvard men's eight at Henley, 2004

The most practiced college sports, measured by NCAA reporting on varsity team participation, are: (1) football (64,000), (2) baseball/softball (47,000), (3) track and field (46,000), (4) soccer (43,000), (5) basketball (32,000), (6) cross-country running (25,000), and (7) swimming/diving (20,000). The most popular sport among female athletes is soccer, followed closely by track and field.

=== High school sports ===
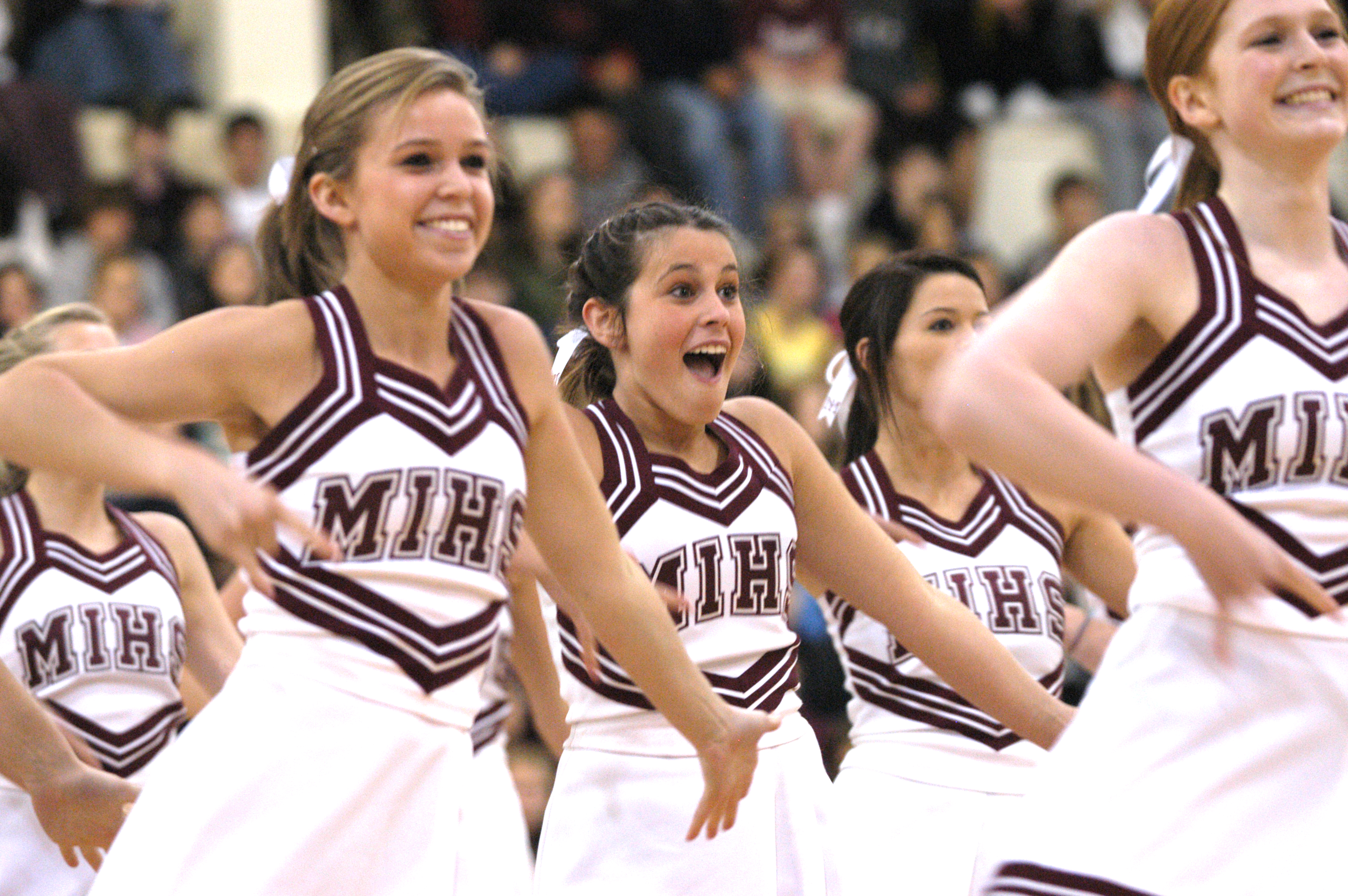
High school cheerleaders. Whether cheerleading constitutes an actual sport is a major source of contention in the U.S.

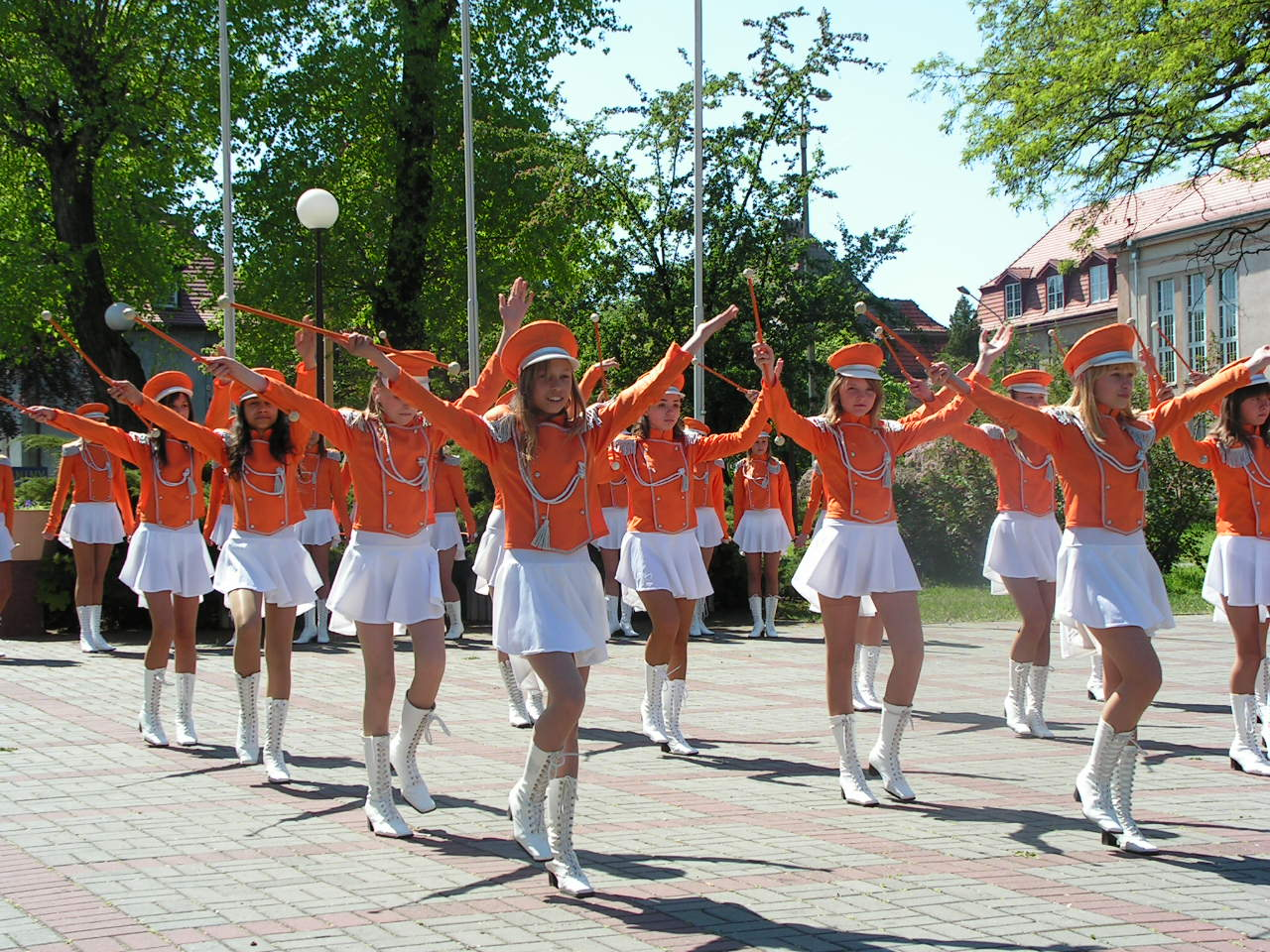
Majorette.

Most public high schools are members of their respective state athletic association, and those associations are members of the National Federation of State High School Associations (NFHS). Some states have separate associations for public and non-public high schools.

The 2018–19 school year was the first in 30 years to see a decrease in high school sports participation. Increases through the previous decades had been largely driven by growth in girls' participation. The high school sports with the highest number of participants for 2018–19 are:

Team sports

1. Football (Note: 11-man football only. An additional 31,421 students played in variants with reduced team sizes (6-man, 8-man, 9-man).) – 1,008,417
2. Basketball – 939,836
3. Baseball/Softball (Note: Softball totals include fast-pitch and slow-pitch variants, with more than 98% of all softball players participating in fast-pitch.) – 854,859
4. Soccer – 853,182
5. Volleyball – 516,371

Individual sports

1. Track & field (outdoor) – 1,093,621
2. Cross country – 488,640
3. Tennis – 348,750
4. Swimming & diving – 309,726
5. Wrestling – 268,565

Notes

Popular high school sports in various regions of the U.S. include the Texas High School football championships, the Indiana basketball championships, and ice hockey in Minnesota. The Minnesota State High School Hockey Tournament is the largest high school sporting event in the country, with average attendance to the top tier, or "AA", games over 18,000.

== Sports media in the United States ==
Half time show at the game between Frisco High vs. Centennial football game.

Sports have been a major part of American broadcasting since the early days of radio. Today, television networks and radio networks pay millions (sometimes billions) of dollars for the rights to broadcast sporting events. Contracts between leagues and broadcasters stipulate how often games must be interrupted for commercials. Because of all of the advertisements, broadcasting contracts are very lucrative and account for the biggest chunk of major professional teams' revenues. Broadcasters also covet the television contracts for the major sports leagues (especially in the case of the NFL) in order to amplify their ability to promote their programming to the audience, especially young and middle-aged adult males.

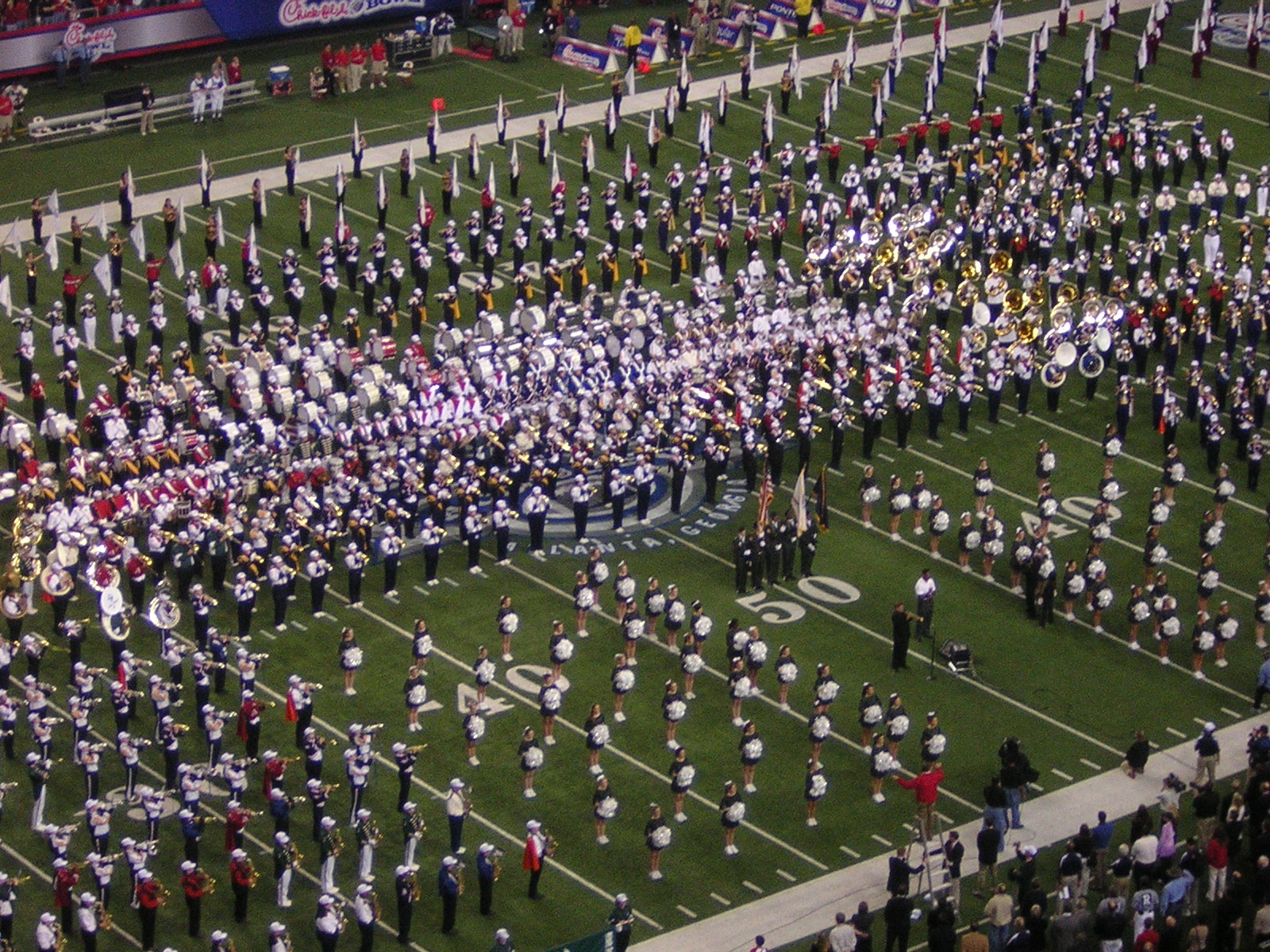
A group of high school marching bands performs at the halftime show of the 2006 Chick-fil-A Bowl.

The advent of cable and satellite television has greatly expanded sports offerings on American TV. ESPN, the first all-sports cable network in the U.S., went on the air in 1979. It has been followed by several sister networks and competitors. Some sports television networks are national, such as CBS Sports Network and Fox Sports 1, whereas others are regional, such as NBC Sports Regional Networks, Bally Sports and Spectrum Sports. General entertainment channels like TBS, TNT, and USA Network also air sports events. Some sports leagues have their own sports networks, such as NFL Network, MLB Network, NBA TV, NHL Network, Big Ten Network, ACC Network and SEC Network. Some sports teams run their own television networks as well.

Sports are also widely broadcast at the local level, ranging from college and professional sports down to (on some smaller stations) recreational and youth leagues. Internet radio and webcasting has allowed these broadcasts to reach a worldwide audience.

American TV sports rights
Sports rights	Sport	National TV contract	Total Revenues	Revenues per year	Ref
National Football League (NFL)	American football	CBS, Fox, NBC, ESPN, YouTube, Verizon, Amazon	$56 billion	$7 billion	
National Basketball Association (NBA)	Basketball	ABC/ESPN, TNT/Max	$24 billion	$2.7 billion	
Major League Baseball (MLB)	Baseball	Fox, ESPN, TBS/Max, Peacock	$12 billion	$1.6 billion	
March Madness	Basketball	CBS, Turner/Max	$8.8 billion	$1.1 billion	
Big Ten Conference (Big Ten or B1G)	College sports	Fox, NBC, CBS	$7.0 billion	$1.0 billion	
NASCAR	Auto racing	NBC/USA, Fox, TNT/Max, Amazon	$8.2 billion	$820 million	
Olympic Games	Multi-sport	NBC	$7.8 billion	$705 million	
College Football Playoff	American football	ESPN, TBS/TNT/Max	$5.6 billion	$470 million	
National Hockey League (NHL)	Ice hockey	ABC, ESPN, TNT/Max	$4.445 billion	$635 million	
Pac-12 Conference (Pac-12)	College sports	Fox	$3.0 billion	$250 million	
Atlantic Coast Conference (ACC)	College sports	ESPN	$0.8 billion	$55 million	
Big 12 Conference (Big 12)	College sports	Fox, ESPN	$2.6 billion	$200 million	
Major League Soccer (MLS)	Soccer	Apple TV, Fox	$2.5 billion	$250 million	
U.S. Open (golf)	Golf	NBC	$1.1 billion	$93 million	
FIFA World Cup	Soccer	Fox, Telemundo	$1.0 billion	$125 million	
English Premier League	Soccer	NBC	$1.0 billion	$167 million	
Southeastern Conference (SEC)	College sports	ESPN, ABC	$0.8 billion	$55 million	
US Open (tennis)	Tennis	ESPN	$0.8 billion	$70 million	
World Baseball Classic (WBC)	Baseball	Fox	N/A	N/A	
IndyCar Series	Auto Racing	Fox, Tubi	N/A	N/A	

== Most popular sports in the United States ==
In the broadest definition of sports—physical recreation of all sorts—the United States Census Bureau, in 2007, found the four most popular sports among the general population of the United States are exercise walking (90 million), exercising with equipment (53 million), swimming (52 million) and camping (47 million). The most popular competitive sport (and fifth most popular recreational sport) is bowling (43 million). Other popular sports included fishing (35 million), bicycling (37 million), weightlifting (33 million), aerobics (30 million), and hiking (28 million).

According to a January 2018 poll by Gallup, 37% of Americans consider football their favorite spectator sport, while 11% prefer basketball, 9% baseball, and 7% soccer. There is some variation by viewer demographics. Men show a stronger preference for football than women, conservatives a stronger preference than liberals, and those over 35 a stronger preference than those under 35. In all groups, however, football is still the most popular. Basketball and soccer are more popular among liberals than conservatives.

For three years in a row, 2021, 2022 and 2023 pickleball was named the fastest growing sport in the United States by the Sports and Fitness Industry Association (SFIA). Between 2019 and 2023, the SFIA estimated the number of US players increased almost 223% to 13.6 million. In March 2023 the Association of Pickleball Players estimated the number of US pickleball players in the previous 12 months had surpassed 48 million.

== Sports leagues in the United States ==
The following table shows the major sports leagues, professional and collegiate, which average over 15,000 fans per game and that have a national TV contract that pays rights fees.

Major professional leagues

League	Sport	Teams	National TV contract	Average Attendance	Total Annual Attendance	Ref
Major League Baseball (MLB)	Baseball	30	NBC; Fox/FS1; ESPN; TBS/TruTV; MLB Network	28,187	68,494,752	
National Basketball Association (NBA)	Basketball	30	ABC/ESPN/Disney+ NBC/NBCSN/Peacock; Amazon Prime Video; NBATV	17,857	21,964,447	
National Football League (NFL)	American football	32	CBS/Paramount + Fox/Tubi; NBC/Peacock; ABC/ESPN/Hulu/Disney+ Amazon Prime Video/Twitch; Netflix; YouTube; NFL Network	67,100	17,177,581	
National Hockey League (NHL)	Ice hockey	32	ABC/ESPN/Hulu/Disney+ TNT/TBS/Max; NHL Network	17,500	21,525,777	
Major League Soccer (MLS)	Soccer	30	Apple; Fox/FS1	22,111	10,900,804	

College football

League	Sport	Teams	National TV contract	Average Attendance	Total Annual Attendance	Ref
Southeastern Conference (SEC)	American football	16	ABC, ESPN	77,334	7,501,356	
Big Ten Conference (B1G)	American football	18	CBS, NBC, Fox	66,788	6,344,869	
Big 12 Conference (XII)	American football	16	ESPN, Fox	54,394	5,004,208	
Atlantic Coast Conference (ACC)	American football	17	ABC, ESPN	49,130	4,519,993	
Pac-12 Conference (PAC)	American football	2	ABC, ESPN, Fox	48,633	3,842,002	
American Athletic Conference (The American)	American football	14	ABC, ESPN	23,820	2,096,138	
Mountain West Conference (MW)	American football	12	CBS, Fox Sports	23,223	1,741,746	
Sun Belt Conference (Sun Belt)	American football	14	ESPN	20,837	1,771,134	
Conference USA (CUSA)	American football	10	CBS-SN, ESPN	15,860	872,274	

== See also ==
- Race and sports in the United States
- Women's sports in the United States
- Youth sports in the United States
- Homosexuality in sports in the United States
- Sports Museum of America
- Sports in the United States by state
  - Professional sports in the Western United States
- Record attendances in United States club soccer
- Western sports
  - Sports in Canada
  - Sport in the United Kingdom
