= Constance Applebee =

US-based British field hockey player (1873–1981)

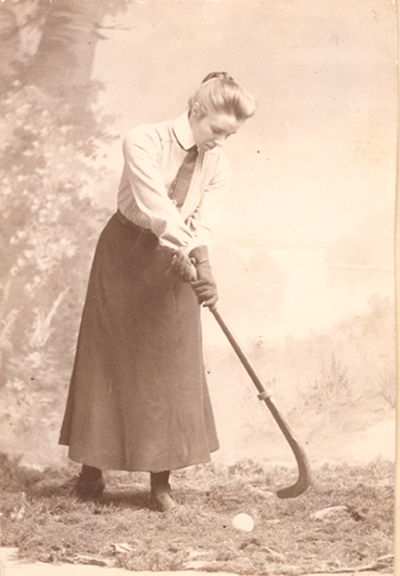
- Applebee demonstrating field hockey, circa 1903
- Born: Constance Mary Katherine Applebee; June 4, 1873; Chigwell, Essex, England
- Died: January 26, 1981 (aged 107); New Milton, Hampshire, England
- Known for: Introducing field hockey in the United States

Constance Mary Katherine Applebee (June 4, 1873 – January 26, 1981) is best known for introducing field hockey in the United States. She was a co-founder of the American Field Hockey Association and served as its head for 20 years. She also founded Sportswoman magazine and was the athletic director at Bryn Mawr College for 24 years.

Applebee graduated from the British College of Physical Education in 1899. In 1901, she came to America and took a course in anthropometry at Dudley Allen Sargent's Summer School of Physical Training at Harvard University. After a discussion among her classmates and instructors regarding the British sport of field hockey, she took them to a courtyard behind the Harvard gymnasium and gave a demonstration of the game.

In the autumn of 1901 she embarked on a tour of women's colleges in the northeastern United States, introducing field hockey and giving coaching and instruction regarding the sport to the students and faculty at each stop. She was invited to Vassar College by Harriet Ballintine, the school's athletic director, and also visited Wellesley College, Bryn Mawr College, Smith College, Mount Holyoke College and Radcliffe College, and Wheaton Female Seminary. She made return visits to each of those schools and the Boston Normal School of Gymnastics to coach field hockey through the spring of 1904. In 1904 she was hired as full-time athletic director at Bryn Mawr College, where she served in that capacity through 1928.

In September 1922, Applebee established an annual three-week camp for intensive field hockey instruction at Mount Pocono, Pennsylvania, on the grounds of Camp Tegawitha. The camp was in business for more than 70 years before finally closing after the 1994 season.

In 1924 she founded The Sportswoman, initially a field hockey magazine that eventually focused on all women's sports

She was more commonly known by her nickname, "The Apple", and on January 26, 1981, she died at 107 at a New Milton, Hampshire, England nursing home. She is buried at St John the Baptist Church at Burley in the New Forest. As well as a grave she is commemorated within the church in one of the stained glass windows.

She was also active in establishing lacrosse as a women's sport in the United States of America. The U. S. Women's Lacrosse Association was founded at her camp in the summer of 1931. The USWLA governed the sport on the collegiate and club levels until 1981, when the NCAA inaugurated its national championship tournament for women.

Applebee was inducted into the International Women's Sports Hall of Fame in 1991.
