= Harriet Isabel Ballintine =

American teacher and professor

- Harriet Ballintine from the 1917 Vassar College yearbook
- Born: December 23, 1864; Le Roy, New York, United States
- Died: February 9, 1951 (aged 86)
- Education: Ingham University, Sargent School of Physical Training
- Occupation(s): teacher, professor
- Known for: leader in the development of physical education for women
- Notable work: athletic director at Vassar College

Harriet Isabel Ballintine (December 23, 1864 – February 9, 1951) was the athletic director at Vassar College from 1891 to 1930 and was a leader in the development of physical education for women.

== Biography ==
Harriet Isabel Ballintine was born December 23, 1864, in Le Roy, New York, a small town in Genesee County. She graduated from Ingham University in 1888, just four years before the institution, sometimes touted as the first University in the United States exclusively for women, was closed due to financial problems. The next year she attended the first class in athletics for women at Harvard Summer School. After studying in Europe, and graduating from the Sargent School of Physical Training in Cambridge, Massachusetts, she returned briefly to Ingham as a teacher. She also taught at Lasell Seminary. In 1891, she moved on to Vassar College where she was first appointed Director of the Gymnasium, and was later named assistant professor. She taught in the Department of Physical Education until her retirement in 1930. Ballintine was responsible for organizing the first collegiate track and field event for women (1895) and also established field hockey not only at Vassar but made it an acceptable sport for women at several institutions in the Northeast.

Ballintine served as an instructor at the Harvard Summer School in 1901 and 1902. It was there in 1901 that she met Constance Applebee and invited the Englishwoman to demonstrate field hockey at Vassar. Later that year, Ballintine and Applebee helped to found the American Field Hockey Association, which governed the sport in the United States for 20 years.

In 1933, the trustees of Vassar College named the campus hockey field and the adjoining road Ballintine Field and Ballintine Road, respectively, after her.

== Writings ==
- "The Value of Athletics to College Girls," American Physical Education Review 6 (June 1901): 151-153.

== Sources ==
- Obituary, The New York Times, 10 February 1951, p. 11
- Obituary, Vassar Miscellany News, 21 February 1951
- Harriet Isabel Ballintine file, Vassar College Biographical Files, Vassar College Archives and Special Collections Library
