= Field hockey in the United States =

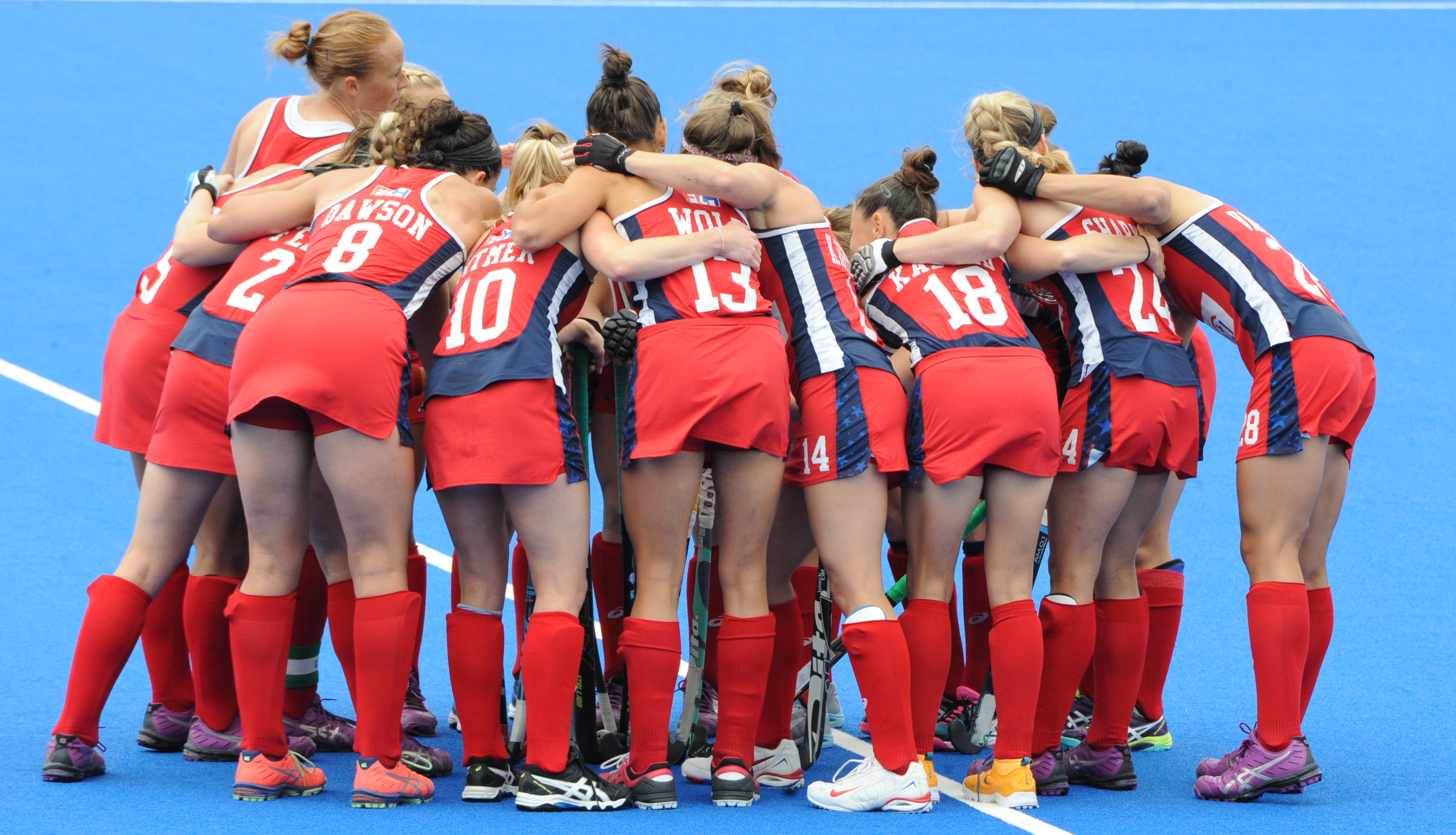
- Players of the US women's team in 2016
- Country: United States
- Governing body: USA Field Hockey
- National teams: Men's national team Women's national team

International competitions
- Summer Olympics; FIH Hockey World League; Pan American Cup; Pan American Games; Indoor Hockey World Cup; Hockey World Cup

Field hockey in the United States is a sport which has only limited popular support. In the United States, the sport used to be female dominated as opposed to Europe's male dominant leagues. However, in the United States of America, there are few field hockey clubs, most play taking place between high school or college sides, almost entirely of females. The strength of college field hockey reflects the impact of Title IX which mandated that colleges should fund men's and women's sports programmes comparably. Pennsylvania is a hotbed for field hockey in the United States.

== History ==
The modern game of field hockey originated in Europe, and grew due to the growth of public schools. Springfield College started playing the game when Dr. James Huff McCurdy composed a set of rules for American Field Hockey, and it continued to grow.

Constance Applebee founded the United States Field Hockey Association (USFHA), after noticing a growing popularity in the sport. The Field Hockey Association of America (FHAA) was created six years later to govern men's field hockey in the United States. The USFHA and FHAA combined April 1993, and the United States Field Hockey Association emerged. The name eventually changed to USA Field Hockey, as we know it today.

The game consists of 11 players, with two opposing teams. Curved sticks are used to move a ball across a 100 yard field, with the objective of scoring goals. It can be played both outdoors and indoors, with slightly different rules for each.

== National board ==
In the United States, it is called Field Hockey to distinguish it from Ice Hockey. It did not have serious competition until the 1970s. The first Women's World Cup took place in 1974 and the US women first competed in Olympic field hockey in 1984 in Los Angeles

The training base for the women's national team used to be Chula Vista, California and was relocated to Lancaster, Pennsylvania. In February, 2020 the announcement was made that the US Women's National Team would no longer be training at Spooky Nook in Lancaster.

== National team ==
USA Field Hockey women's team has competed in the Olympics in 1984, 1988, 1996, 2008, 2012, and 2016. The 1984 Olympics the women's team made their first appearance, and earned bronze. At the 2016 Olympics, Team USA closely lost to Germany in the quarterfinals.

One high scoring member of the USA team is Kathleen Sharkey, who attended Princeton University. She managed to lead Division 1 field hockey with most goals scored from 2010 to 2012. She was named two time Ivy League Offensive Player of the Year. The men's national team has achieved limited success in international tournaments in comparison to their female counterparts.

== See also ==
- USA Field Hockey
