= June 1913 =

Month of 1913

| << | June 1913 | | | | | >> |
| Su | Mo | Tu | We | Th | Fr | Sa |
| 1 | 2 | 3 | 4 | 5 | 6 | 7 |
| 8 | 9 | 10 | 11 | 12 | 13 | 14 |
| 15 | 16 | 17 | 18 | 19 | 20 | 21 |
| 22 | 23 | 24 | 25 | 26 | 27 | 28 |
| 29 | 30 |

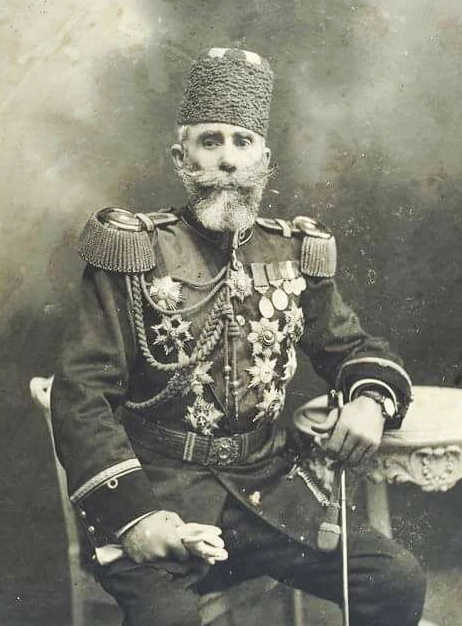
June 11, 1913: Ottoman Grand Vizier Shefket Pasha assassinated in drive-by shooting

June 8, 1913: British suffragette leader Emily Davison killed in Epsom Derby accident

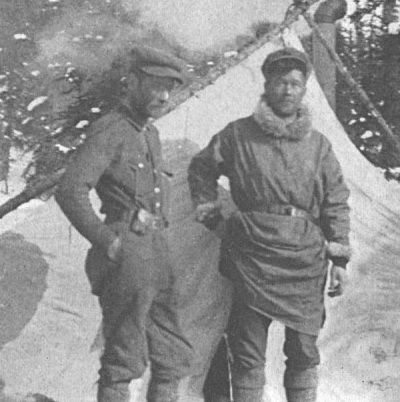
June 7, 1913: Four-man team becomes first to climb to the top of North America's highest mountain

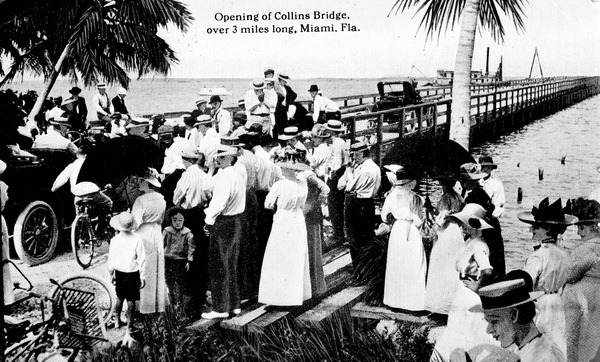
June 12, 1913: New bridge transforms Miami, Florida, into world-famous tourist attraction

The following events occurred in June 1913:

== June 1, 1913 (Sunday) ==
- Greece and Serbia signed an alliance to attack their former Balkan League ally, Bulgaria.

== June 2, 1913 (Monday) ==
- After U.S. President Woodrow Wilson warned the public about the money being spent by lobbyists to fight tariff reform, the United States Senate ordered its Judiciary Committee to prepare a report with "the names of all lobbyists attempting to influence such pending legislation and the methods that they have employed to accomplish their ends." Over the next six days, the 96 Senators were required to appear before a special subcommittee and to state, under oath, whether they had a financial interest in the outcome of any pending bills.
- The first Canadian Pacific Railway train crossed the newly built High Level Bridge in Edmonton, which spanned a length of 777 m (2,549 ft) across the North Saskatchewan River. Street car service was added on August 11.
- Passenger service was opened to rail stations Copperas Hill, Lowca, Micklam, Moss Bay, and Rose Hill in Cumbria, England.
- A rail station opened west of Dover, England to serve the South Eastern Main Line. It was closed in 1994.
- A Confederate monument, nicknamed Silent Sam, was unveiled at University of North Carolina at Chapel Hill. The statue was pulled down by protesters in 2018.
- The town of Winona Lake, Indiana, was incorporated.
- Born:
  - Barbara Pym, English writer, as Mary Crampton, known for her novels Excellent Women and Quartet in Autumn; in Oswestry, Shropshire (d. 1980)
  - Elsie Tu, British activist, supporter of Hong Kong independence from Great Britain; as Elsie Hume, in Newcastle upon Tyne, Northumberland, England (d. 2015)
- Died: Alfred Austin, 78, British poet, Poet Laureate of the United Kingdom from 1896 to 1913 (b. 1835)

== June 3, 1913 (Tuesday) ==
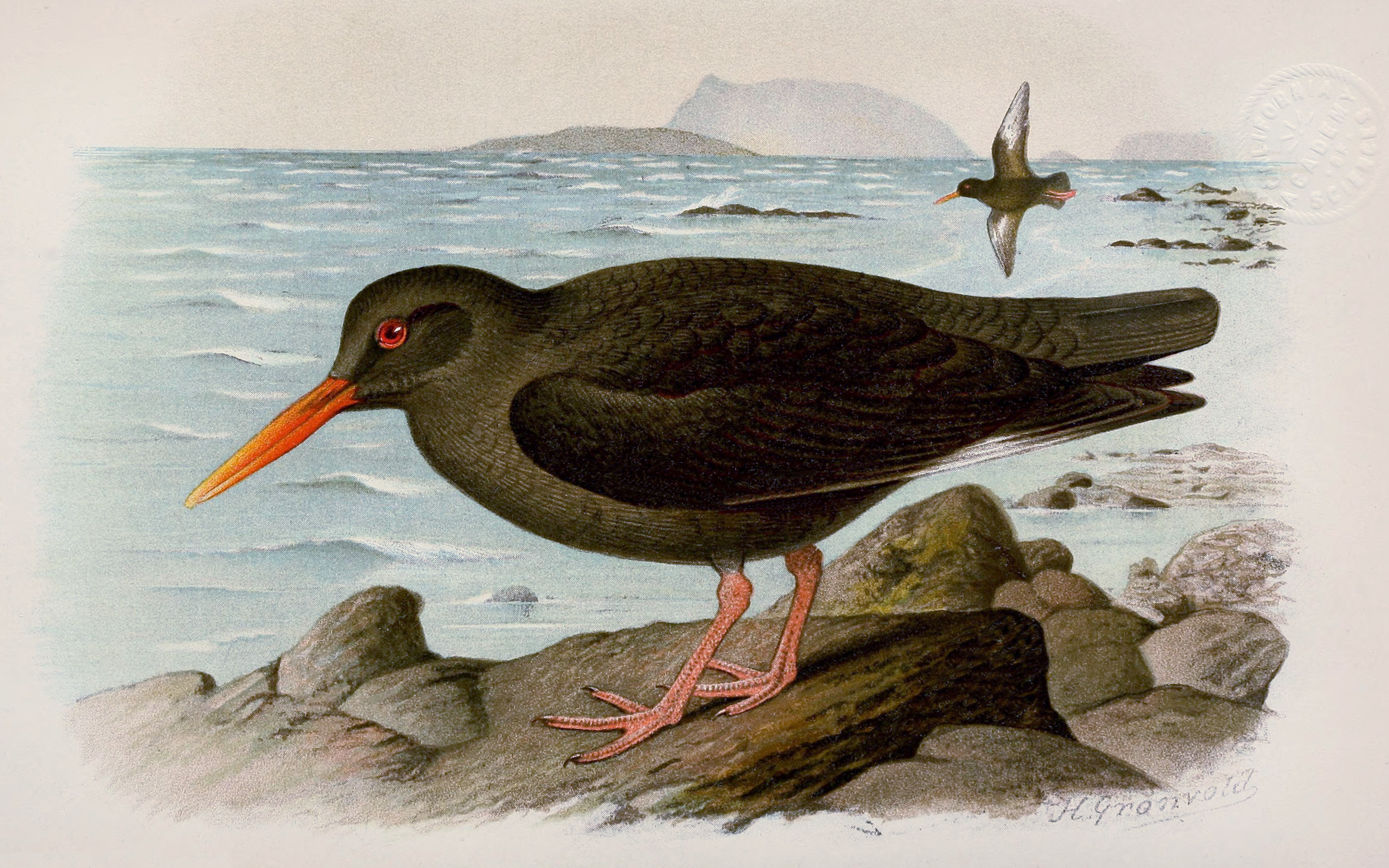
The Canarian Oystercatcher, now extinct

- The last known specimen of the Canary Islands oystercatcher (Haematopus meadewaldoi) was caught, then released, by British ornithologist David Armitage Bannerman. Possible sightings were reported as late as the 1960s, but the bird is considered extinct.
- Mexican rebels, commanded by General Lucio Blanco, captured Matamoros, Tamaulipas, Mexico across the Rio Grande from Brownsville, Texas.
- Russian composer Igor Stravinsky and his wife Yekaterina ate oysters for dinner, and then fell ill with typhus and were incapacitated for more than a month.
- Born:
  - Charles H. Fairbanks, American archaeologist, known for research into Georgia's Ocmulgee Mounds; in Bainbridge, New York (d. 1984)
  - George Hourani, British philosopher, best known for his work in Islamic philosophy; in Manchester (d. 1984)
- Died:
  - James Hamilton, 2nd Duke of Abercorn, British politician, who served as Lord High Constable of Ireland at the 1911 coronation of George V, in London (b. 1838)

== June 4, 1913 (Wednesday) ==
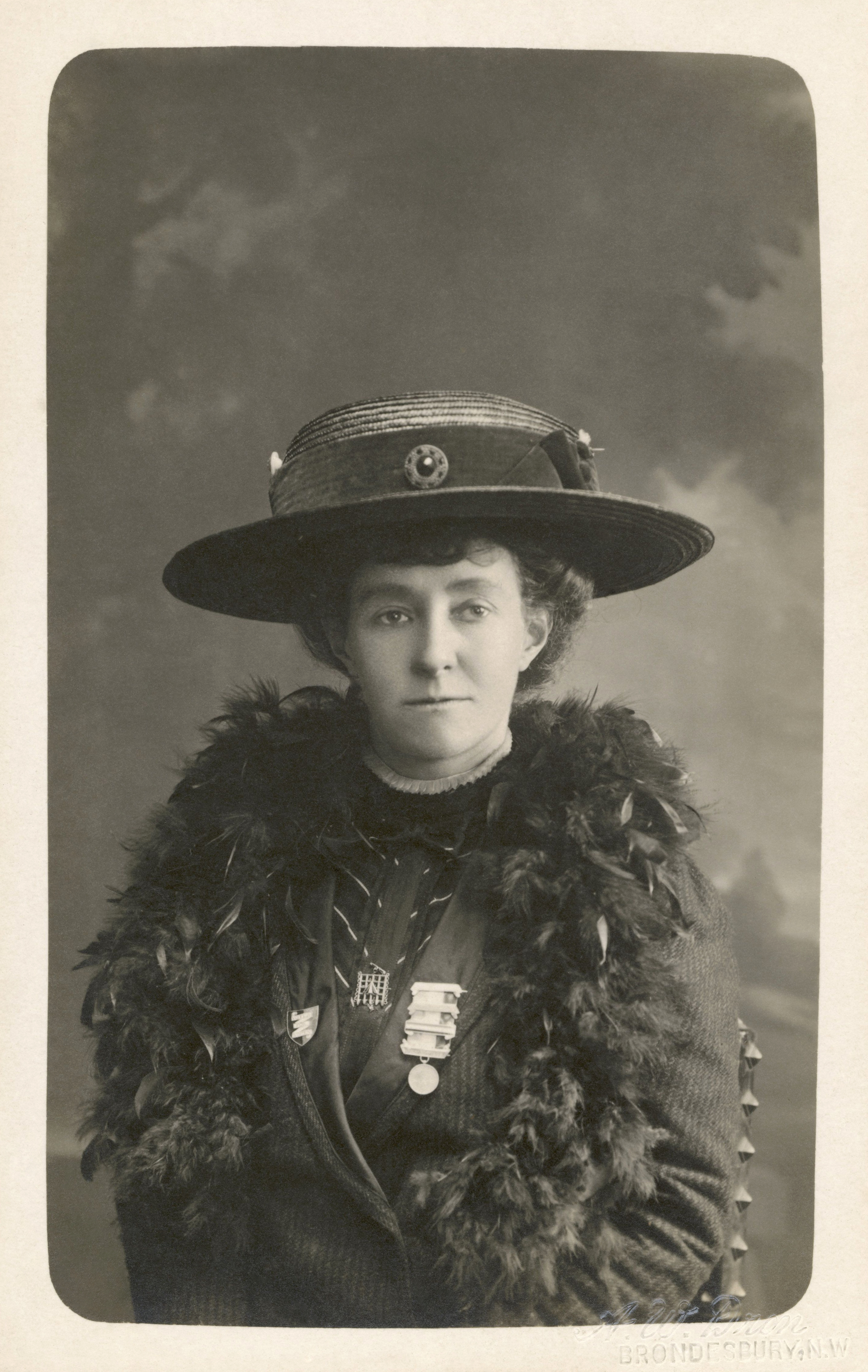
Emily Wilding Davison

- Suffragette Emily Davison was fatally injured when she ran in front of Anmer, the racehorse owned by King George, in the running of the Epsom Derby. Davison came from out of the stands, ducked under a railing and past police, and ran out in front of the horse, who was in last place. Herbert Jones, who was riding Anmer, was thrown and knocked unconscious for two hours, while Davison was trampled by the horse and never woke up. She died four days later.
- The Epsom Derby was won by Aboyeur, who had 100 to 1 odds against him and had finished in second place behind the favorite, Cragonour. After Cragonour was announced as the winner, an objection was raised by race stewards, because American jockey Johnnie Reiff had bumped other horses on the way to the finish.
- Prime Minister László Lukács of Hungary and his cabinet resigned. István Tisza was asked by Austro-Hungarian Emperor Franz Joseph to form a new cabinet.
- German battleship Markgraf was launched by AG Weser in Bremen as one of four ships in her class that would participate in the Battle of Jutland in 1916.
- In Chicago, world heavyweight boxing champion Jack Johnson was sentenced to one year and one day in prison at Joliet, Illinois, after being found guilty of violating the Mann Act. He was also given two weeks to seek a reconsideration.
- Shoeless Joe Jackson, at that time a player for the Cleveland Indians, in a game against the New York Yankees, hit what was believed to be "the longest home run ever hit in the major leagues up to that time."
- The opera Julien by composer Gustave Charpentier premiered at the Opéra-Comique in Paris.
- Al Jolson made his first song recording with "You Made Me Love You (I Didn't Want to Do It)", by James V. Monaco and Joseph McCarthy, through Columbia Records. Jolson had already popularized the song in the Broadway show The Honeymoon Express, and the recording became one of the biggest song hits of the year.

== June 5, 1913 (Thursday) ==
- Ambassadors Theatre opened on West Street, Westminster, London.
- The opera Khovanshchina by composer Modest Mussorgsky premiered at the Théâtre des Champs-Élysées in Paris.
- Spanish pianist and partner Ricardo Viñes performed in public Descriptions automatiques by French composer Erik Satie during a concert at Salle Érard in Paris.
- Died: Chris von der Ahe, 61, German-born American sports executive, founder and owner of the St. Louis Brown Stockings (now the St. Louis Cardinals); from cirrhosis (b. 1851)

== June 6, 1913 (Friday) ==
- Prince Albert Frederick George, the 17-year-old son of King George V, and the future King George VI, made his first visit to the United States, crossing the border from Canada into Niagara Falls, New York. Prince Albert, who was in Canada with 60 cadets from HMS Cumberland, was not immediately recognized in the crowd, but told reporters later that "This is my first trip to the continent and the first time I have stood under the Stars and Stripes on American soil."
- Stoneyetts Hospital opened in Moodiesburn, Scotland. Originally intended for the treatment of patients with epilepsy, it later cared for those with intellectual disabilities and mental disorders. It operated until 1992.
- Born: Carlo L. Golino, Italian-born American scholar, best known for his research and promotion of Italian literature in the United States; in Pescara (d. 1991)

== June 7, 1913 (Saturday) ==
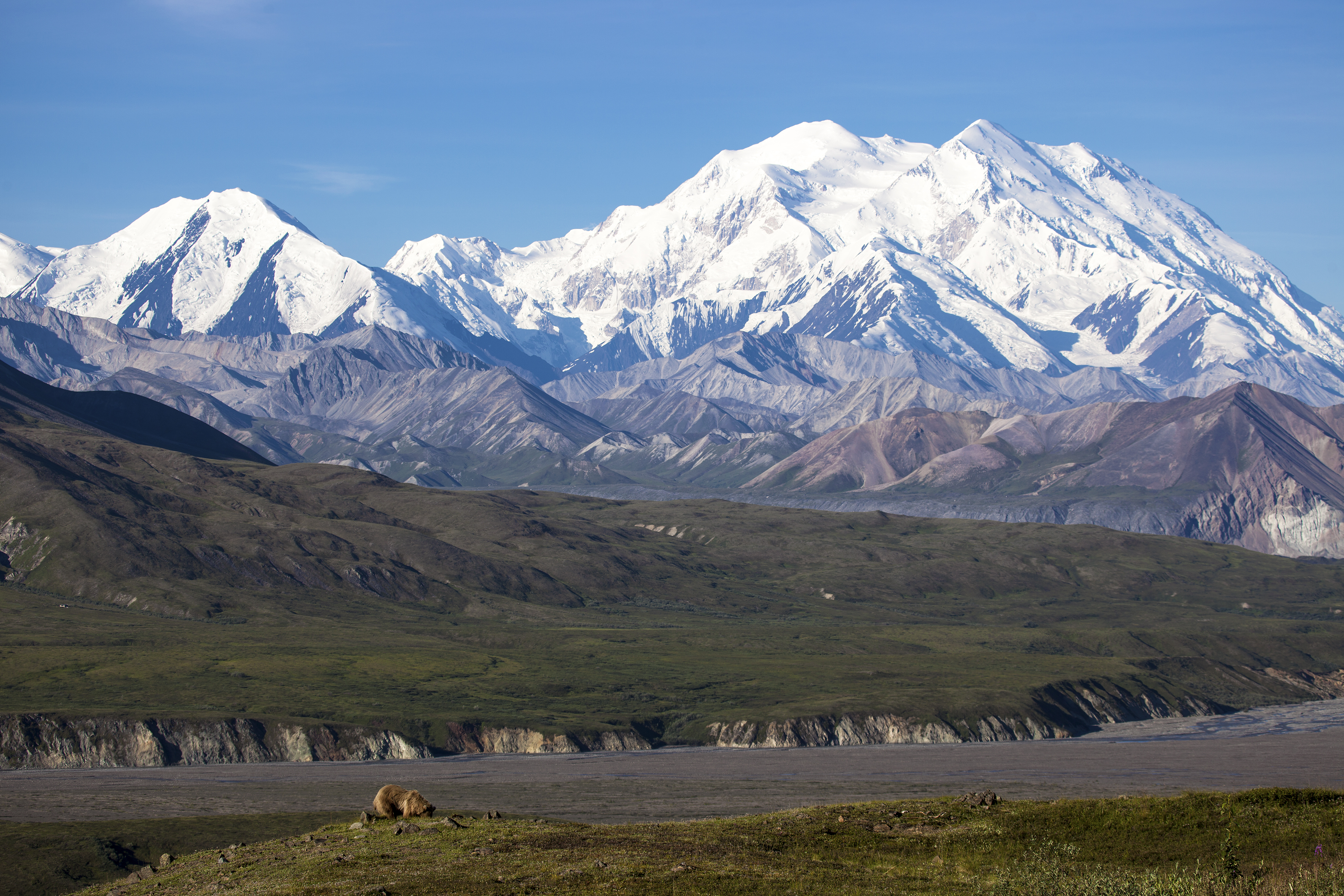
Denali, formerly known as Mount McKinley

- Archdeacon Hudson Stuck and a team of mountaineers (Harry Karstens, Robert Tatum and Walter Harper) became the first persons to reach the top of North America's highest mountain, the 20,310 feet (6,190 m) high Mount McKinley (now Denali) in Alaska. Harper, born in Alaska and son of an Athabaskan mother, was the first of the group to reach the summit. The feat was reported on June 20.
- United Mine Workers president John Phillip White and 18 other union officials were indicted by a federal grand jury in Charleston, West Virginia on charges of violating the Sherman Antitrust law.
- The world's largest swimming pool, as wide as a city block (400 feet, 120 m) and twice as long (600 feet, 180 m), opened at Palisades Amusement Park in New Jersey. The pool, made of cement, was constructed by park owners and brothers Nicholas and Joseph M. Schenck.

== June 8, 1913 (Sunday) ==
- Thirty thousand German athletes attended the dedication of the Deutsches Stadion at Grunewald, near Berlin, which was scheduled to host the 1916 Summer Olympics. Due to World War I, the Games would not take place.
- Died:
  - Emily Davison, 40, British activist, prominent member of the Women's Social and Political Union (b. 1872)
  - Charles Augustus Briggs, 72, American theologian, early proponent of Liberal Christianity (b. 1841)

== June 9, 1913 (Monday) ==
- St. Bridget College was established in Batangas City, Philippines.
- John Maynard Keynes, whose theories of economics would have worldwide impact, published his first book, Indian Currency and Finance.
- Born: Patrick Steptoe, British physician who pioneered in vitro fertilisation with Robert Edwards; in Oxford, Oxfordshire (d. 1988)

== June 10, 1913 (Tuesday) ==
- The Supreme Court of the United States upheld the constitutionality of the law requiring newspapers to publish statements of circulation and ownership, and to mark advertising plainly.
- Anna Johnson of Colfax, Wisconsin became the first blind graduate of the Wisconsin School for the Deaf at Delavan, Wisconsin. Miss Johnson, who was blind, deaf and mute "with the further handicap of being minus one lower limb" had achieved honors in literature and history, and planned to attend Gallaudet College.
- Tsar Nicholas dedicated the opening of the Kronstadt Naval Cathedral specific to the Russian Navy in Kronstadt, Saint Petersburg.
- The football club Colțea București was established in Bucharest.
- Born:
  - Tikhon Khrennikov, Soviet Russian composer, known for works including his operas Into the Storm, four-time recipient of the Order of Lenin and the Order of the Red Banner of Labour; in Yelets, Russian Empire (d. 2007)
  - Wilbur J. Cohen, U.S. Secretary of Health Education and Welfare 1968 to 1969; in Milwaukee, United States (d. 1987)

== June 11, 1913 (Wednesday) ==
- Turkish Grand Vizier Mahmud Shevket Pasha was assassinated in Istanbul. Shefket Pasha was being driven from the Ministry of War in a car, when another car pulled alongside him and ten shots were fired. Said Halim Pasha, the Foreign Minister, was appointed as his successor. Twelve "real or alleged plotters" were arrested, and hanged on June 24.
- The five-day long Battle of Bud Bagsak started in the Philippines when United States Army General John J. "Black Jack" Pershing lead a combined force of American soldiers, Philippine Scouts and the Philippine Constabulary against a contingent of 500 Moro warriors. Chiefs Naquib Amil, Jami and Sahipa sent word that they would not surrender.
- Spanish gunboat Cañonero General Concha ran aground due to dense fog in hostile Moroccan territory near Alhucemas, Spanish Morocco where they were set upon by Kabyle rebels. The crew of 53 held off the rebels for 15 hours before they were rescued by the Spanish Navy, afterwards the boat was shelled and sunk. In the wreck and ensuing fight, the crew suffered 16 dead, 17 injured and 11 taken prisoner.
- A record of 36 hours underwater was set by the Cage, a submarine invented by John Milton Cage Sr., who had taken the boat down at 5:00 am the day prior, along with five other men.
- The German ocean liner SS Imperator, largest in the world at the time, was launched from Hamburg.
- The football club Santanense was established in Santana do Livramento, Brazil.
- Born:
  - Vince Lombardi, American football coach, two-time Super Bowl champion as head coach for the Green Bay Packers; as Vincent Lombardi, in New York City (d. 1970)
  - Risë Stevens, American opera singer, known for her collaborations with Metropolitan Opera including Carmen; as Risë Steenberg, in New York City (d. 2013)

== June 12, 1913 (Thursday) ==
- Even as both nations were preparing to go to war with each other, Serbia and Bulgaria agreed to Russian arbitration of their dispute over the territories captured during the First Balkan War.
- Klaus Berntsen resigned as Prime Minister of Denmark.
- Said Halim Pasha was appointed as the new Ottoman Grand Vizier, serving until February 3, 1917.
- Billed as "the longest wooden bridge in the world", the 2.5 mile long Collins Bridge opened, turning the small town of Miami, Florida (1910 population 5,471) into a premier resort area by making Miami Beach more accessible to tourists. Previously, the beach could only be reached from the mainland by ferry boat and was impractical as an investment.
- John Randolph Bray, an American animator, premiered the innovative cartoon The Artist's Dream, which an author would later say was "the forerunner of the cartoon vogue" as the first popular animated film.

== June 13, 1913 (Friday) ==
- The United States Senate Committee on Woman Suffrage reported favorably on a proposed amendment to the U.S. Constitution providing that the right to vote shall not be denied because of gender.
- The U.S. government successfully broke up the monopoly held by gunpowder manufacturer E.I. du Pont de Nemours and Company. The corporation was split into three competing companies, DuPont (which would diversify into chemical manufacturing), Hercules Powder Company and Atlas Powder Company. On the same day, the DuPont Cellophane Company, of which DuPont had 52% ownership of, was formed in partnership with a French consortium for the American manufacturing of transparent cellophane sheets.
- L.G. Balfour Company was established initially as a jewelry design company in Attleboro, Massachusetts.
- Attorney Walton J. Wood began work as the first public defender in the United States, earning $200 a month as an employee of Los Angeles County, California, to represent persons who could not afford a lawyer.
- The Danish Sailing Association was established in Copenhagen.
- Community newspaper The Enterprise began publication in Katoomba, New South Wales, Australia.
- Born: Ralph Edwards, American television personality, host of the television game show Truth or Consequences and This Is Your Life; in Merino, Colorado (d. 2005)
- Died: Camille Lemonnier, 69, Belgian writer, member of the La Jeune Belgique literary society and founding member of Société Libre des Beaux-Arts (b. 1844)

== June 14, 1913 (Saturday) ==
- Eleven construction workers for the Bradley Contracting Company were killed in the cave-in of new subways underneath Fifty-sixth Street in New York City.
- The German battlecruiser Derfflinger, first of its class and the most powerful German battleship up to that time, was launched. Moments after it was christened by the wife of General August von Mackensen, the ship moved only fifteen inches down the skids before it came to a halt, jammed because of a defect in one of the sledges.
- The South African government passed the Immigration Act, which restricted the immigration of people from India.
- The funeral procession for Emily Davison, an English suffragette who was trampled by a horse while protesting at the Epsom Derby on the 4th of June 1913, was held. Thousands of suffragettes marched from Buckingham Palace Road to St George's Church where Miss Davison's body was laid to rest.
- The Connaught Park Racetrack began hosting thoroughbred horse racing in Aylmer, Quebec, with former Canadian Prime Minister Wilfrid Laurier in attendance. The racetrack switched to standardbred horse racing in 1954, but eventually closed in 2009.
- A monument to the American Civil War was dedicated in front of the Old Sedgwick County Courthouse in Wichita, Kansas.
- Born: Stanley Black, British composer, best known for his scores for television and film including The Goon Show and Laughter in Paradise; as Solomon Schwartz, in London (d. 2002)

== June 15, 1913 (Sunday) ==
- Driven out by shelling from American and Philippine troops during the Battle of Bud Bagsak, the 500 Moro defenders made a charge against the firepower of the Pershing contingent's artillery, and were killed. Pershing's troops sustained 27 casualties. The uneven battle brought an end to the Moro resistance with the deaths of 2,000 Moro defenders, including women and children, as well as the death of 340 American troops.
- American schooner Paul Palmer caught fire while en route to Newport News, Virginia. The crew was forced to abandon ship before she sank.
- The Walsh Island Dockyard and Engineering Works was established in Newcastle, New South Wales, Australia.

== June 16, 1913 (Monday) ==
- Kaiser Wilhelm celebrated the 25th anniversary of his ascension to the throne in 1888. "Twenty-five years of peace," the Kaiser told American industrialist and peace delegate Andrew Carnegie, "and I hope there will be twenty-five more." The German Empire would enter World War I less than fourteen months later. Half a million people lined the streets of Berlin to cheer the Kaiser and the Kaiserin. The Kaiser proclaimed an amnesty for "those whose misdeeds were committed through poverty or while in a state of irresponsibility," and for Army and Navy men punished for most violations of regulations.
- The Lewisburg and Tyrone Railroad in Pennsylvania foreclosed a second time, but reformed for a final time in 1915 before it became subsidiary of Pennsylvania Railroad.
- Died:
  - Della Fox, 42, American actress and singer, best known for her collaborations with DeWolf Hopper (b. 1870)
  - Mary Seney Sheldon, 49, American music executive, first female president of the New York Philharmonic (b. 1863)

== June 17, 1913 (Tuesday) ==
- The first round of elections in the Netherlands began for 54 of the 100 seats in the Tweede Kamer. The other 46 would be decided the following Sunday.
- The Welsh Church Act was passed on its second reading, by the British House of Commons, after having been reintroduced following rejection in the House of Lords. The Act, which would become law in 1914, provided for the Church of England to be disestablished in Wales in favor of a separate Church in Wales.
- The College of the Holy Spirit Manila was established in Manila as an all-female school until 2005.

== June 18, 1913 (Wednesday) ==
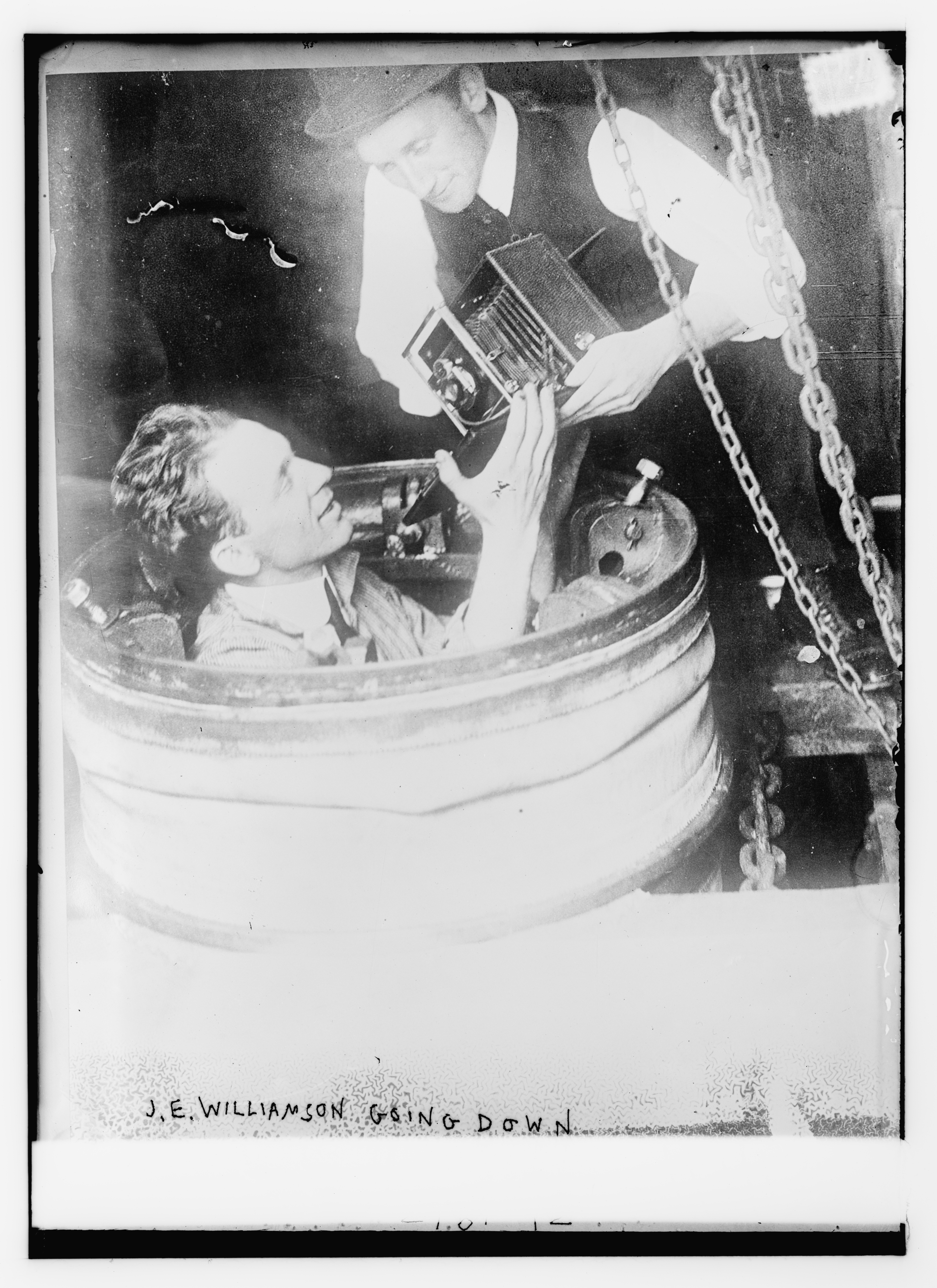
Williamson taking his camera undersea

- The Arab Congress opened in Paris, during which Arab nationalists meet to discuss desired reforms under the Ottoman Empire.
- Governor-General Charles Lutaud abolished the requirement for natives to obtain travel permits within French Algeria, or from Algeria to mainland France.
- Royal Navy submarine AE2 was launched by Vickers Limited in Barrow-in-Furness, England to serve in the Royal Australian Navy during World War I but was scuttled in 1915 during naval operations in the Dardanelles campaign.
- John Ernest Williamson, whose father had invented a transparent diving bell called the "photosphere", became the first person to take photographs from beneath the ocean surface, by taking a camera with him and snapping pictures while underwater inside the bell.
- The Hamburg-American ocean liner Imperator, the largest ship in the world, arrived safely in New York on its maiden transatlantic voyage.
- Born:
  - Sylvia Porter, American economist and journalist, best known for her financial columns for the New York Post and the New York Daily News; as Sylvia Feldman, in Patchogue, New York (d. 1991)
  - Sammy Cahn, American songwriter, four-time recipient of the Academy Award for Best Original Song, known for hit songs including "Come Fly with Me" and "Let It Snow! Let It Snow! Let It Snow!"; as Samuel Cohen, in New York City, United States (d. 1993)
  - Robert Mondavi, American winemaker, promoter of Californian wines in the Napa Valley to international markets; in Virginia, Minnesota, United States (d. 2008)
  - Oswald Teichmüller, German mathematician, best known for his work in differential geometry; as Paul Julius Oswald Teichmüller, in Nordhausen, Thuringia, German Empire (present-day Germany) (killed in battle, 1943)
- Died: Thomas Allibone Janvier, 63, American historian and writer, known for short stories and articles including In the Sargasso Sea (b. 1849)

== June 19, 1913 (Thursday) ==
- The Parliament of South Africa passed the Natives Land Act, defining which areas could be owned by white South Africans, and which by black South Africans. Black South Africans were barred from purchasing or owning white persons' property.
- The British House of Commons voted 346–268 to acquit Attorney General Rufus Isaacs and Chancellor of the Exchequer David Lloyd George on charges of malfeasance arising from ownership of shares in the Marconi Wireless Telegraph Company of America.
- Thirteen people were killed in the collision of two trains near Vallejo, California.
- Italian occupation forces fought a fierce battle against the Arab residents of Ettangi, Tripolitania. Libya.
- The Army's Auxiliary Aerial Militia Squadron, precursor to the Mexican Air Force, was established.
- French pilot Maurice Prévost set a new airplane speed record, averaging 117 miles per hour in a flight of over 217 miles, in a circular course near Paris.

== June 20, 1913 (Friday) ==
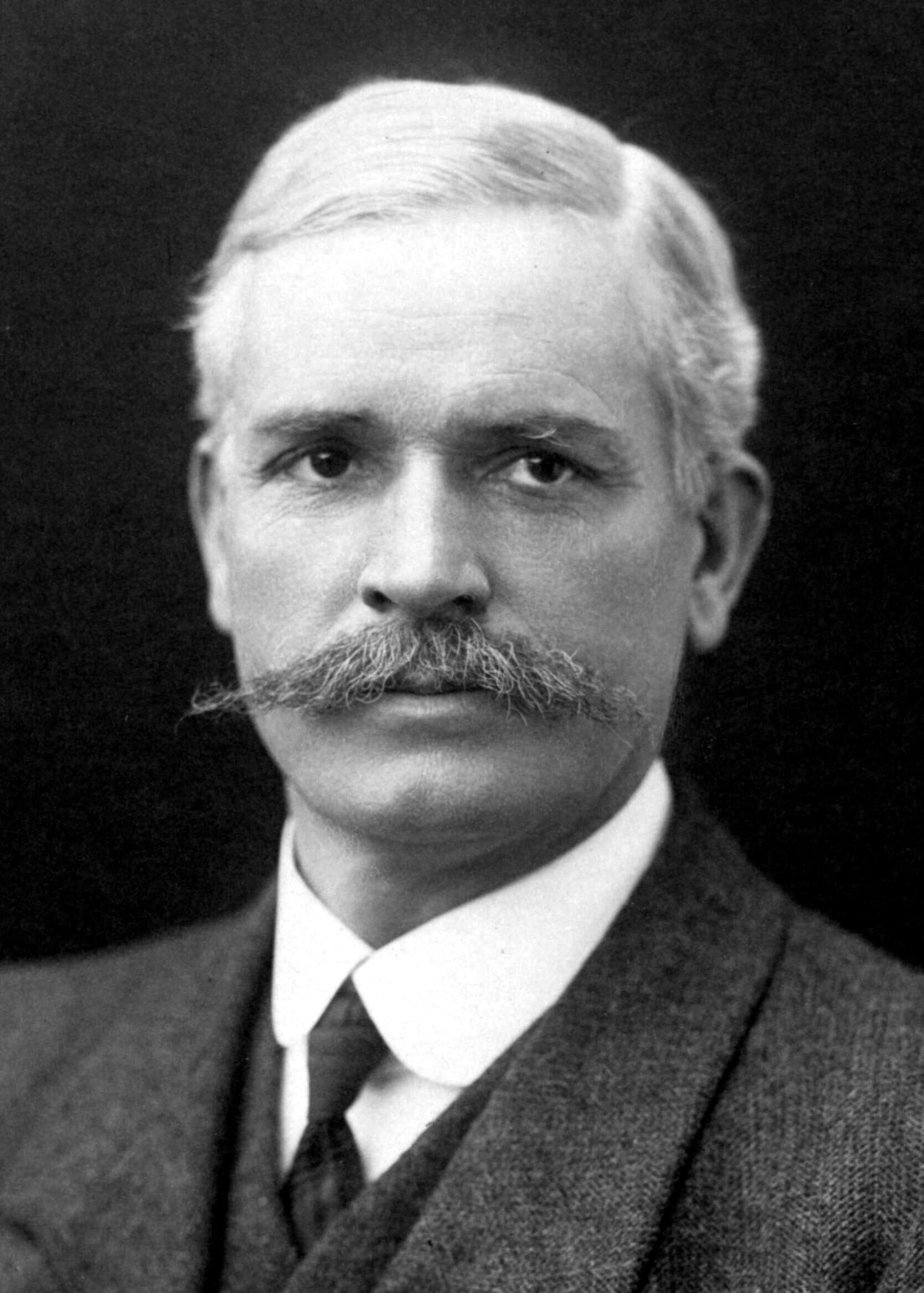
Former Prime Minister Andrew Fisher

- Andrew Fisher resigned as Prime Minister of Australia after the defeat of the Australian Labor Party in parliamentary elections.
- Romania mobilized its armed forces in preparation for an invasion of Bulgaria.
- Football club Lovćen was established in Cetinje, Montenegro and remains one of the oldest clubs in Southeast Europe.
- Born:
  - Juan de Borbón y Battenberg, pretender to the Spanish throne, head of the Spanish royal family during exile, son of King Alfonso, father to King Juan Carlos; in Real Sitio de San Ildefonso (d. 1993)
  - Lilian Jackson Braun, American mystery writer, best known for the "Cat Who series", starting in 1966 with The Cat Who Could Read Backwards; as Lilian Jackson, in Chicopee, Massachusetts (d. 2011)
- Died:
  - Sydenham Elnathan Ancona, 88, U.S. Representative for Pennsylvania from 1861 to 1867, the last surviving member of Congress to have participated in the voting on the American Civil War in 1860 (b. 1824)
  - Frederick Johnstone, 71, British politician, Member of Parliament and horse trainer whose horses won the Epsom Derby 1883 and 1892 (b. 1841)

== June 21, 1913 (Saturday) ==
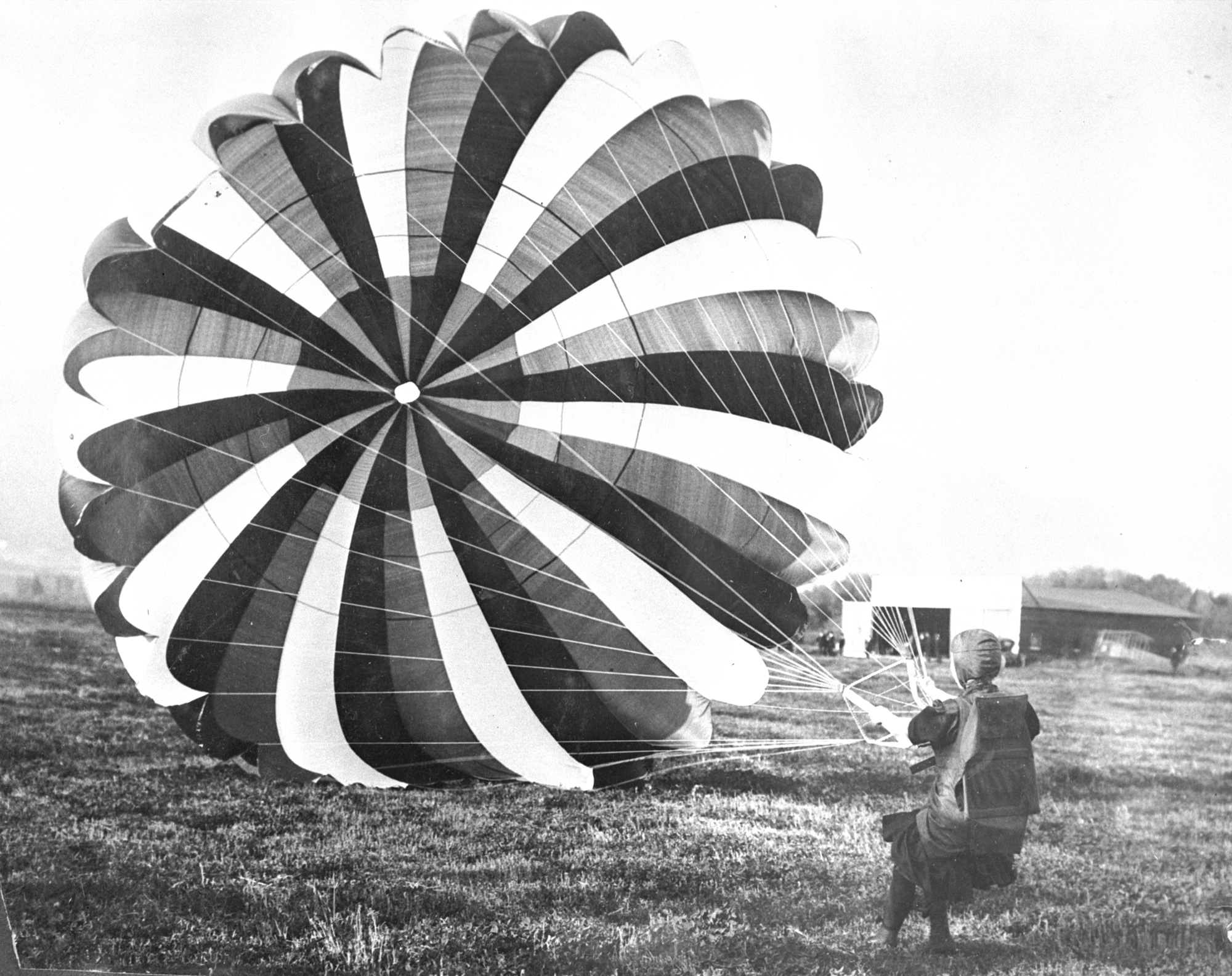
A safe landing by Tiny Broadwick

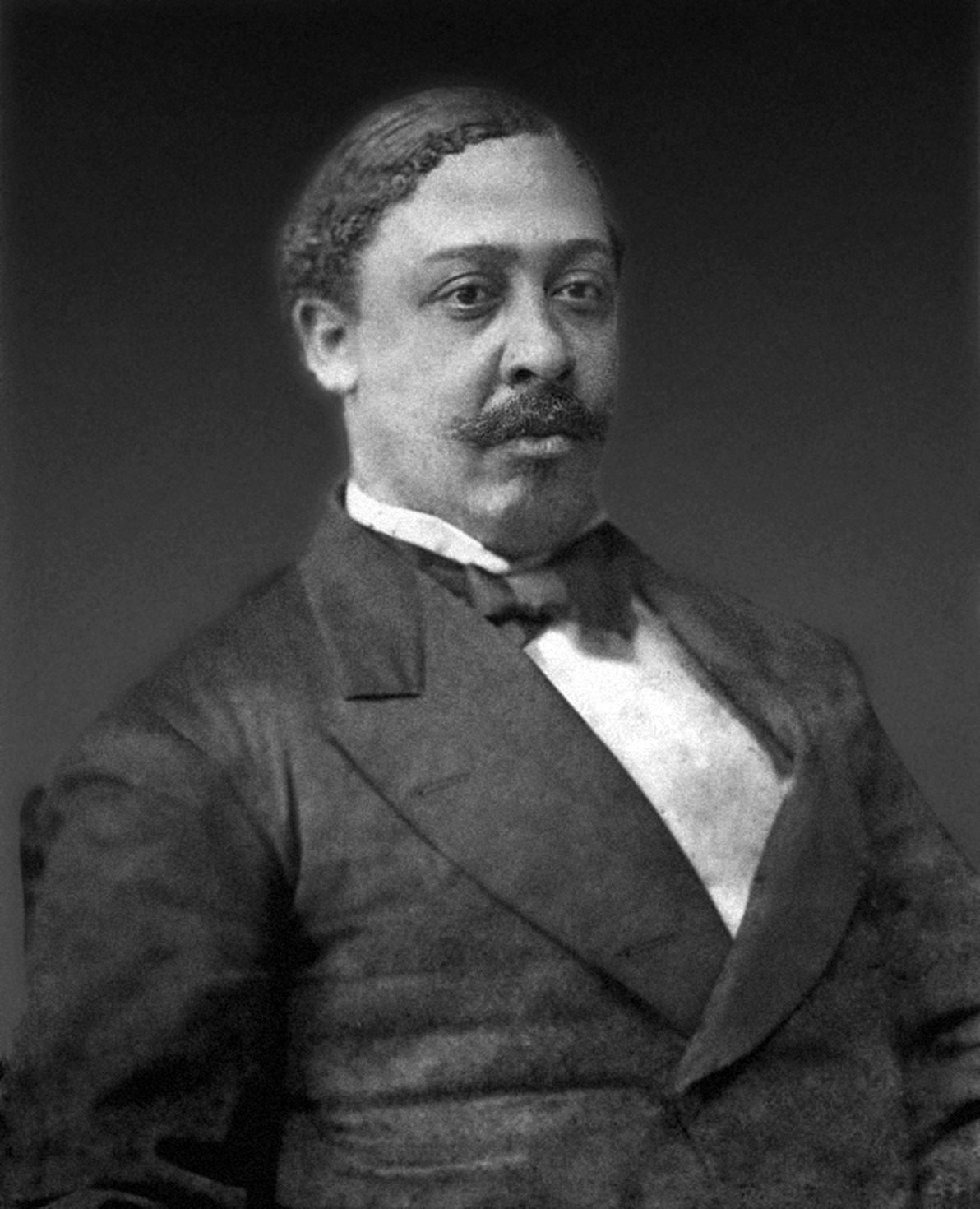
Charles E. Nash, U.S. Congressman

- Carl Theodor Zahle, who previously had served as Prime Minister of Denmark, formed a new cabinet to succeed Klaus Berntsen.
- Georgia Thompson "Tiny" Broadwick became the first woman to parachute from an airplane, jumping from a plane piloted by aviator Glenn L. Martin over Los Angeles. Broadwick had volunteered to test Martin's invention of a "trap seat" that would allow people to bail out of an airplane more quickly.
- "First Lady of Texas" Ima Hogg established the Houston Symphony orchestra.
- Born:
  - Jim Cavanagh, Australian politician, Senator for South Australia from 1962 to 1981, cabinet minister of the Gough Whitlam administration; as James Cavanagh, near Adelaide, (d. 1990)
  - Luis Taruc, Philippine leader of the communist guerrilla group Hukbalahap; in San Luis, Pampanga, Insular Government of the Philippine Islands (d. 2005)
  - Kid Azteca, Mexican boxer and one of only a few boxers to win more than 50 bouts by knockout; as Luis Villanueva Páramo, in Mexico City, Mexico (d. 2002)
- Died: Charles E. Nash, 69, African-American U.S. Representative for Louisiana from 1875 to 1877 during the Reconstruction era and first person of color represent the state in the United States Congress (b. 1844)

== June 22, 1913 (Sunday) ==
- Serbia's Prime Minister Nikola Pašić and his cabinet resigned because of the nation's lack of progress in negotiating with Bulgaria, after which the Serbian minister left Sofia. Pašić formed a new government when the Second Balkan War broke out days later.
- Born: Álvaro Alsogaray, Argentine politician, cabinet minister for the José María Guido administration; in Esperanza, Santa Fe (d. 2005)
- Died: Henry Cox Jones, 92, American politician, last surviving member of the Provisional Congress of the Confederate States, having served as a Representative for Alabama from 1861 to 1862 (b. 1821)

== June 23, 1913 (Monday) ==
- U.S. President Woodrow Wilson addressed a joint session of Congress on his support of the McAdoo-Owen-Glass Banking Bill, and the need to create a federal reserve system for banking. The legislation would pass at the end of the year as the Federal Reserve Act.
- The first of 32 men were hanged for the assassination of Grand Vizier Mahmud Shevket Pasha.
- The predecessor of the Aldi store chain was opened by Anna Siepmann (later Anna Albrecht) in Schonnebeck, a suburb of Essen in Germany. In the 1920s, after marrying a coal miner, she would give birth to two sons, Karl and Theo Albrecht, who would, on July 10, 1946, create the discount grocery store called Albrecht Diskont, before using the first two syllables to coin the name (in 1962) to Aldi.
- Born:
  - William P. Rogers, United States Secretary of State 1969-1973 and Attorney General 1957-1961; in Norfolk, New York (d. 2001)
  - Carlos A. Cooks, Dominican Republic-born American activist, leader of the Universal Negro Improvement Association and African Communities League after Marcus Garvey; in Santo Domingo (d. 1966)
  - Nathan Abshire, American Cajun musician, early promoter of the Cajun style of accordion music; in Gueydan, Louisiana, United States (d. 1981)
  - Helen Humes, American jazz and blues singer, known for her collaborations with Count Basie; in Louisville, Kentucky, United States (d. 1981)
  - Jacques Rabemananjara, Malagasy poet, promoter of négritude literature in Madagascar; in Maroantsetra, French Madagascar (present-day Madagascar) (d. 2005)
- Died: Nicolás de Piérola, 74, President of Peru from 1879 to 1881 and 1895 to 1899 (b. 1839)

== June 24, 1913 (Tuesday) ==
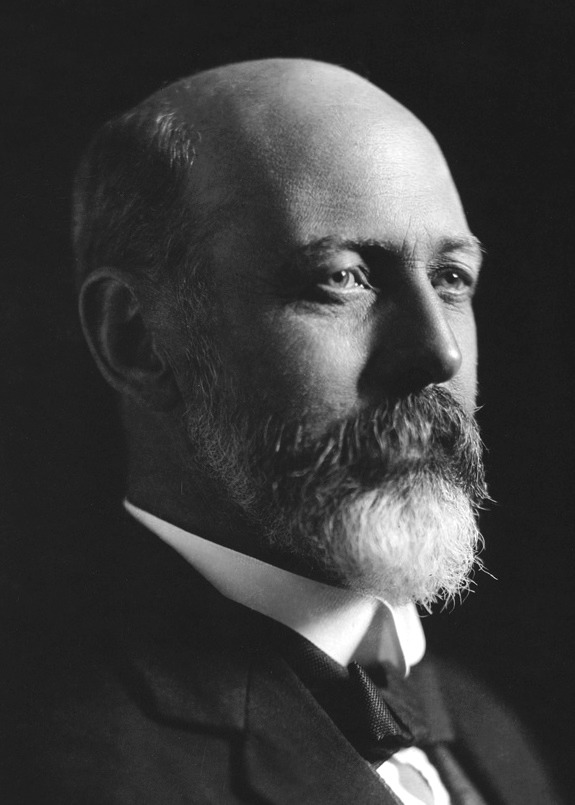
Joseph Cook, Prime Minister of Australia

- Joseph Cook was sworn in as the sixth Prime Minister of Australia after being requested by Governor-General Thomas Denman to form a new government, replacing the ninth Australian Government led by Andrew Fisher.
- The explosion of a grain elevator at Buffalo, New York killed 17 men and injured 50 others.
- Prime Minister Carl Theodor Zahle announced in the Rigsdagen (Danish Parliament) that he would lobby for women's suffrage in Denmark.
- Born: Vincent Ferrini, American poet, known for his poetry collections including the Know Fish series; as Venanzio Ugo Ferrini, in Saugus, Massachusetts (d. 2007)

== June 25, 1913 (Wednesday) ==
- Less than a month after they had fought as allies in the First Balkan War, Bulgaria and Serbia battled each other at Zletovo, North Macedonia.
- The results of Dutch elections showed that the Liberal Party had obtained a 55-45 majority in the Chamber of Deputies.
- The Reichstag in Berlin passed the German nationality law.
- Astronomer Henry Norris Russell of Princeton University announced his discovery of a correlation between the total radiation of a star and its temperature.
- The statue of colonial settler Jacob Leisler, designed by Solon Borglum, was installed in New Rochelle, New York.
- Born: Cyril Fletcher, British comedian, best known for his comedic segments on the BBC television series That's Life!; in Watford, Hertfordshire (d. 2005)

== June 26, 1913 (Thursday) ==
- The Washington Senators hosted the Philadelphia Athletics for a baseball doubleheader, and batted first in the second game at Washington, D.C., a departure from the rule that the visitors start off the game at bat. The Athletics won 10–3. The oddity would not happen again for 94 years, until September 26, 2007, in Washington state, when the Seattle Mariners hosted the Cleveland Indians and batted first, in a game which Cleveland would win 12–4.
- The city of Avalon, California, was incorporated.
- Born:
  - Aimé Césaire, French Martinican poet, author of Une Tempête and Discourse on Colonialism; in Basse-Pointe, Martinique (d. 2008)
  - Maurice Wilkes, British computer scientist, developer of the EDSAC computer; in Dudley, Worcestershire, England (d. 2010)
  - Rudolf Brazda, German-born French activist, survivor of the Holocaust interned at the Buchenwald concentration camp for his homosexuality; in Brossen (d. 2011)
- Died: Cromartie Sutherland-Leveson-Gower, 61, British noble referred to as the "largest landowner in Europe except the Czar," with 1,385,000 acres of land, or more than 2,100 square miles (b. 1851)

== June 27, 1913 (Friday) ==
- Theo Heemskerk resigned as Prime Minister of the Netherlands.
- The replacement for the Moreton Bay Pile Light house was officially lit in Moreton Bay, Australia.
- Born:
  - Willie Mosconi, American pool player, won the World Straight Pool Championship 15 times in the row; as William Mosconi, in Philadelphia) (d. 1993)
  - Richard Pike Bissell, American author known for 7½ Cents, in Dubuque, Iowa (d. 1977)
  - Elton Britt, American country singer; as James Britt Baker, in Marshall, Arkansas (d. 1972)
  - Philip Guston, Canadian-born American artist, member of the New York School; as Philip Goldstein, in Montreal (d. 1980)
- Died: Philip Sclater, 83, British biologist known for his discovery and research on the blue-eyed black lemur and the erect-crested penguin (b. 1829)

== June 28, 1913 (Saturday) ==
- The United States and Japan renewed their arbitration treaty in an event attended by United States Secretary of State William Jennings Bryan and Japanese Ambassador Chinda Sutemi.
- The nine-mile long Lötschberg Tunnel through the Alps, linking Switzerland and Italy, was formally opened.
- Rhaetian Railway completed the Bever–Scuol-Tarasp railway in Switzerland with stations Ardez, Guarda, La Punt, Lavin, Scuol-Tarasp, Susch, and Zuoz serving the line.
- The merger of the Union Pacific Railroad and Southern Pacific Railroad was dissolved in order to settle the antitrust lawsuit brought by the United States Department of Justice.
- The Philadelphian cricket team played its final match against the Australia national cricket team at the Merion Cricket Club in Philadelphia before dissolving like many other American cricket clubs that year due to the rising popularity of baseball as a spectator sport in the United States.
- Born: Franz Antel, Austrian filmmaker, known for his films Casanova & Co. and Der Bockerer; in Vienna, Austria-Hungary (d. 2007)
- Died: Manuel Ferraz de Campos Sales, 72, President of Brazil 1898 to 1902 (b. 1841)

== June 29, 1913 (Sunday) ==
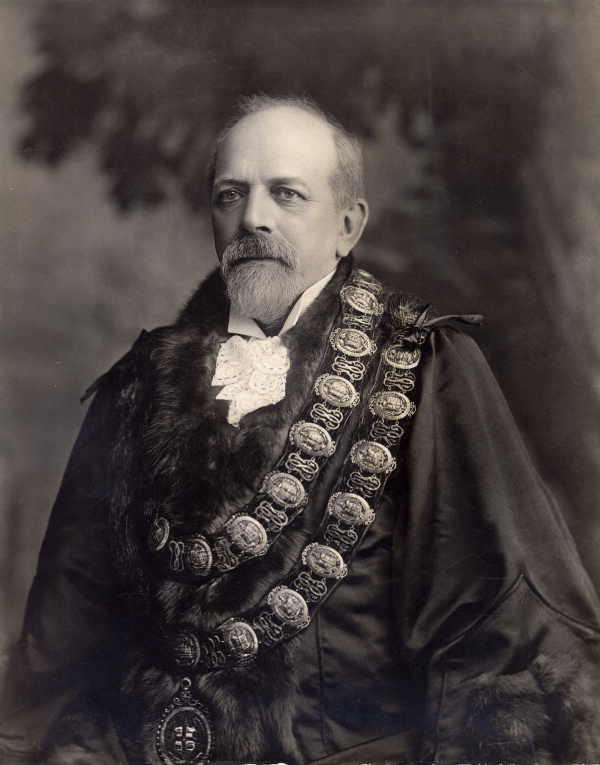
Former Mayor of Melbourne, Samuel Gillott

- The Second Balkan War formally began with a surprise attack by Bulgaria on the armies of Serbia (at Slatovo) and Greece at Salonika. The war would last for six weeks, ending with Bulgaria's defeat. On August 10, 1913, Bulgaria would sign a treaty at Bucharest, ceding territory to Romania, Greece and Serbia.
- Australian leader James McGowen dissolved the 35th ministry of the Government of New South Wales and resigned as Premier of New South Wales. He was replaced by William Holman whose administration remained in office for the next seven years.
- In a baseball game between the Chicago Cubs and the Cincinnati Reds, only one baseball was necessary for the entire game.
- The football Juventude was established in Caxias do Sul, Brazil.
- Died:
  - Samuel Gillott, 74, Australian politician, Mayor of Melbourne (b. 1838)
  - Alfred H. Love, 82, American peace activist, founder and President of the Universal Peace Union (b. 1830)

== June 30, 1913 (Monday) ==
- The Reichstag voted to increase the size of the army in Germany by 136,000 officers and men.
- The city of Guaymas, Mexico fell to rebels.
- Lawrence bathhouse tragedy – Eleven boys in Lawrence, Massachusetts drowned when the pier they were on that led to a floating bathhouse in the Merrimack River suddenly collapsed. About forty young men were stomping their feet while waiting for the doors to open, causing the pier to break apart.
- The Great Trial Stakes horse racing competition was held for the last time at the Sheepshead Bay Race Track in Sheepshead Bay, New York.
- Born:
  - Alfonso López Michelsen, President of Colombia 1974 to 1978; in Bogotá (d. 2007)
  - Harry Wismer, American sports executive, owner of the New York Titans from 1960 to 1962; in Port Huron, Michigan (killed in car accident, 1967)
- Died: Henri Rochefort, 82, French journalist and activist, founder of L'Intransigeant (b. 1831)
