= Robert Tatum =

American mountain climber and Episcopal priest

Personal information
- Nationality: American
- Born: August 20, 1891 Knoxville, Tennessee
- Died: January 27, 1964 (aged 72)

Climbing career
- Major ascents: Denali (Mount McKinley) (June 7, 1913)

Robert George Tatum (August 20, 1891 – January 27, 1964) was an American mountain climber and Episcopal priest. He, along with Hudson Stuck, Harry Karstens, and Walter Harper made up the expedition that was the first to successfully climb Denali, the tallest mountain in North America, on June 7, 1913.

== Early life ==
Tatum was born on August 20, 1891, in Knoxville, Tennessee, the son of George, a photographer, and Emma Tatum. He grew up in Knoxville, and went to Sewanee: The University of the South. In June 1911 he moved to Nenana, Alaska, to visit his brother Howard, who was working at an Army outpost. That summer, Robert worked as a surveyor for the government; after that, he taught at an Episcopalian mission school.

== Denali expedition ==
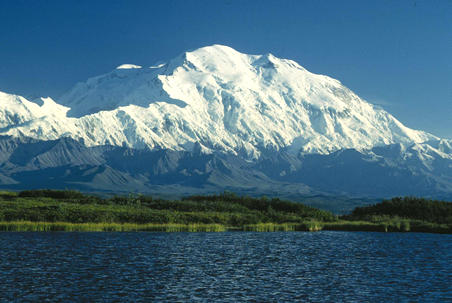
Denali from the north

Episcopalian archdeacon Hudson Stuck, who would later become the expedition leader, first met Tatum during a regular visit to the mission school. Stuck asked Tatum if he would join him in ascending Denali (Mount McKinley) for the first time; he immediately accepted. In preparation for the climb, Tatum hiked about 1,200 miles (1,900 km), including a trip to Tanana Crossing with other missionaries to establish a new mission.

On March 17, 1913, the expedition left Nenana to climb McKinley. Besides Stuck and Tatum (who was the cook), the party consisted of Harry Peter Karstens, who led the expedition with Stuck; Walter Harper, an Alaska Native who had been Stuck's travelling companion for three years; and two Gwich'in teenagers, Johnny Fredson and Esaias George, who helped at base camp and brought the dog teams back down before the summit.

On June 6, they arrived at their final camp after three months of sometimes very dangerous climbing.

Early the next morning, the party set off to reach the summit. Around noon, they finally reached the top of Mount McKinley, at an elevation of 20,310 feet (6,190 m). During the hour and a half they spent on the summit, Tatum planted a flag he had made earlier out of handkerchiefs and other miscellaneous items. He compared the view to "looking out of a window of heaven." They began the descent, which only took two days to get back to base camp. They returned to Tanana on June 20, just over three months since they left.

== Later life ==
During World War I, Tatum served as a Corporal in the US Army.

On June 7, 1922, Tatum was ordained an Episcopal priest in Nenana, but he soon returned to his hometown of Knoxville, where he ministered until his death on January 27, 1964.

== Legacy ==
Mount Tatum was named by Bradford Washburn in about 1945 for Tatum. The 11,053-foot-high (3,369 m) mountain is located in the Carpe Ridge between the Muldrow and Traleika Glaciers, about 10 miles (16 km) away from Denali.
