= Mount Koven (Alaska) =

Mountain in Alaska, United States

- Location within Alaska

Highest point
- Elevation: 12,142 ft (3,701 m)
- Prominence: 1,260 ft (380 m)
- Coordinates: 63°08′01″N 150°53′44″W

Geography
- Location: Denali Borough, Alaska, United States
- Parent range: Alaska Range
- Topo map: USGS Mount McKinley A-2

Mount Koven is a 12,142-foot (3,701 m) mountain in the Alaska Range, in Denali National Park and Preserve. Mount Eldridge lies to the northeast of Denali on Karstens Ridge, with Mount Carpe to the northeast on the Carpe Ridge extension of Denali's northeast buttress. Mount Koven overlooks the Great Icefall of Muldrow Glacier, with the west fork of Traleika Glacier to the east. It was named for Theodore G. Koven, whose partner, Allen Carpé (for whom Mount Carpe is named) died in a crevasse fall on the Muldrow while the two were doing research for the Rockefeller Cosmic Ray Expedition in May 1932. Attempting to help, Koven apparently fell into the same crevasse, and though he managed to climb out he too died, and was found frozen not far away.

== See also ==
- Mountain peaks of Alaska
