= Harry Karstens =

American mountain climber (1878–1955)

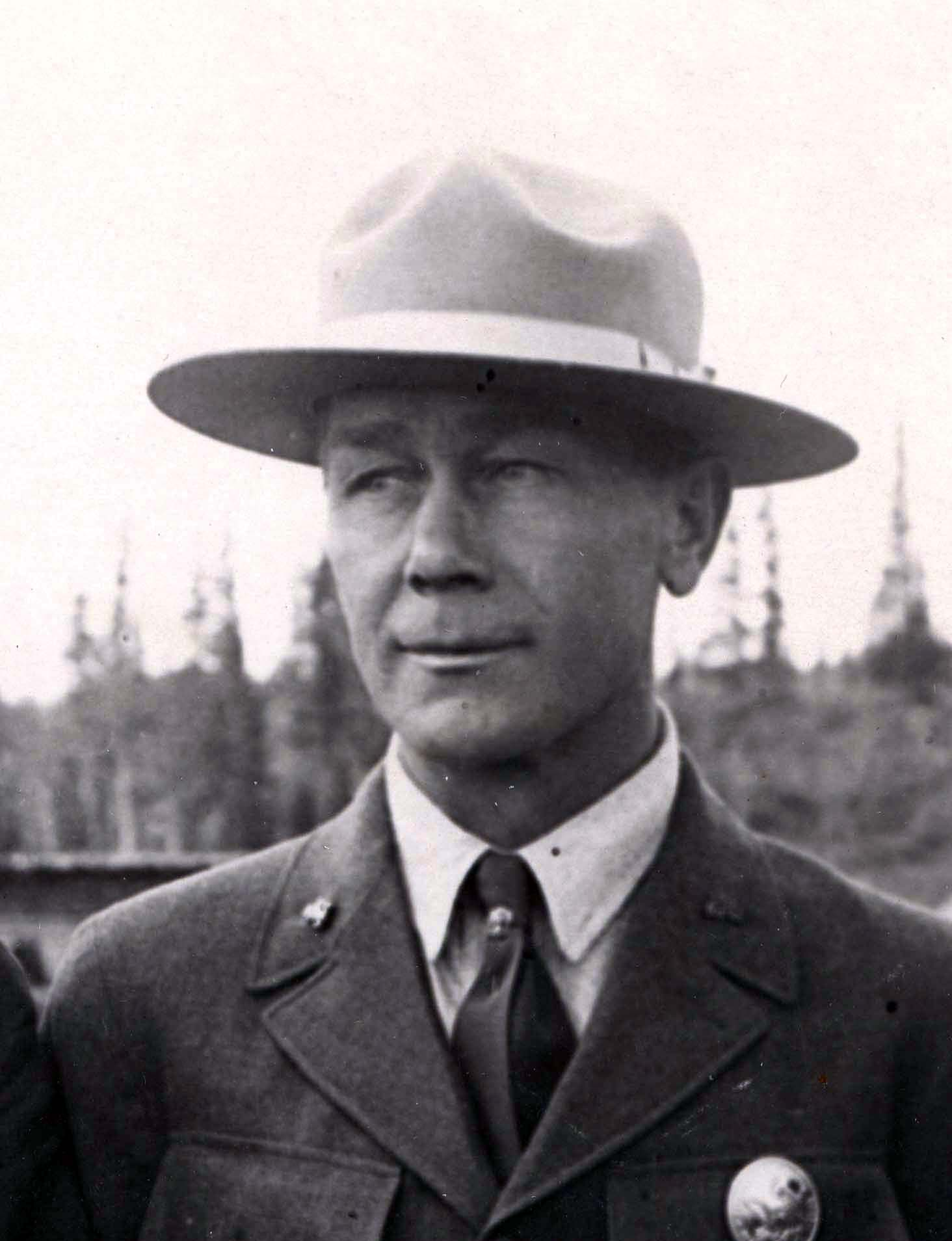
- Harry Karstens in 1927 as superintendent of Mount McKinley National Park.

Personal information
- Nationality: American
- Born: September 2, 1878 Chicago, Illinois
- Died: November 28, 1955 (aged 77) Fairbanks, Alaska

Climbing career
- Major ascents: Denali (June 7, 1913)

Henry Peter Karstens (September 2, 1878 – November 28, 1955) was the first superintendent of Denali National Park, from 1921 to 1928. He was the guide and climbing leader of the first complete ascent of Denali in 1913, with expedition members Hudson Stuck, Walter Harper and Robert Tatum. John Fredson and Esaias George were two young Gwich'in Alaska Natives who supported the party.

== Early life ==
Harry Karstens was born in Chicago, Illinois on September 2, 1878. His parents were Emma Terveen and John Jacob Karstens, an immigrant from the Duchy of Holstein. His father owned a feed store and livery. Harry was the fifth born of seven children in his family.

== Career ==
Like many young men, Karstens went North for adventure to Dawson City, Canada during the Klondike Gold Rush in 1897; he was nineteen. There, he mined on Seventymile Creek and helped lay out the town of Eagle, Alaska. He also carried freight and mail with Charles McGonagall via dog teams among the frontier towns of Fairbanks, Valdez and Kantishna, being paid $75 per month. He gained his nickname as the "Seventymile Kid" after working for the post office.

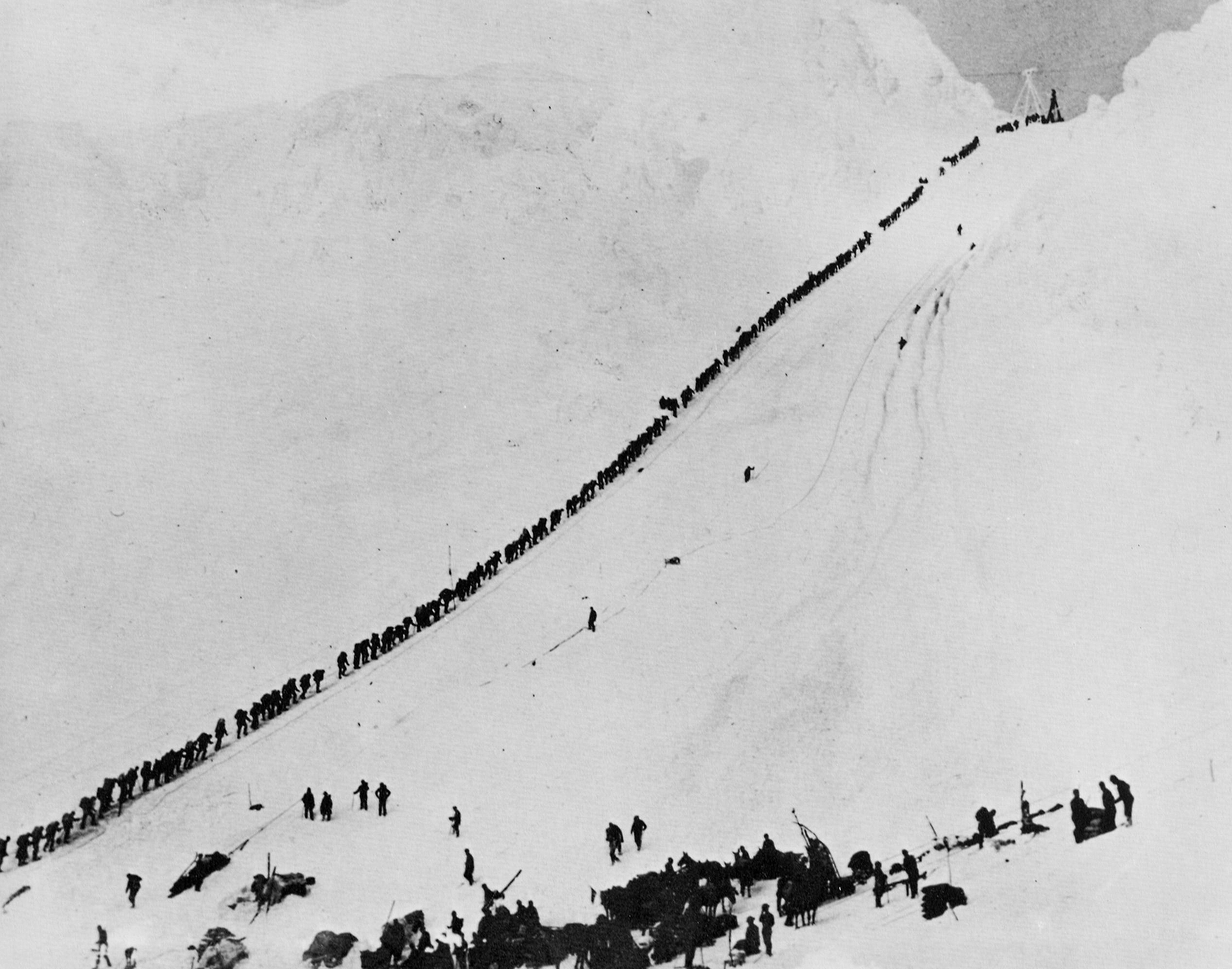
Miners and packers climb 1500 ice steps at Chilkoot Pass, September 1898

He also worked as a packer, hauling miners' supplies over the Chilkoot Pass on his back, usually in 50-pound packs. In winter, the ice leading to the summit was cut into 1500 steps, which travelers climbed in single file. Authorities required each "stampeder" (the persons intending to stay and mine) to bring in two tons of supplies to provide for himself for a year in the camps.

Karstens ran dog teams on the frontier, as well as riverboats when the rivers were navigable.

Drawing on his skills developed on the frontier, from 1906 to 1908, Karstens accompanied Charles Sheldon, a hunter, conservationist, and naturalist, on hunting trips into the Toklat River region. Sheldon, the chairman of the influential Boone and Crockett Club, successfully campaigned with Congress to have the area set aside as a national park. In 1917, Denali National Park was established as Mount McKinley National Park.

=== Denali expedition ===
On March 27, 1912, Hudson Stuck, Episcopal Archdeacon of the Yukon, sent Karstens a letter inviting him to join an expedition to climb Denali. Stuck emphasized the financial value of the trip, saying, "if we succeed in the ascent, the expedition will not be without the likelihood of financial value, and that there will be return to you for the time and labour." Karstens accepted.

While Stuck had been traveling in Alaska for several years for his work and had experience mountain climbing, Karstens had the greater experience, which he applied as guide to the small expedition. Its other members were Walter Harper and Robert Tatum, both 21 at the time. In addition, two Gwich'in youths from Stuck's mission school, Johnny Fredson and Esias George, supported the party by managing its dog teams, and in base camp by hunting for meat and organizing supplies. (Fredson later became the first Alaska Native to graduate from college and was a lifelong leader of the Gwich'in people, founding their Venetie Indian Reserve in 1941).

The expedition party left from Nenana on March 17, 1913, and proceeded up the Tanana River valley. The first day, they hiked 30 miles (48 km) up the Tanana with two sleds of supplies pulled by fourteen dogs. The 110-mile (180 km) trip up the river to Eureka took eight days; there, they replenished supplies and celebrated Easter.

After leaving Eureka, the terrain became rougher, and the expedition's pace slowed to about 10 miles (16 km) a day. At an elevation of 2,000 feet (610 m), the party established base camp near the tree line of the mountain, where they encountered temperatures as low as −46 °F (−43 °C). They set off again, up the crevasse-filled, steep Muldrow Glacier. While they were camping at the top of the glacier, a tent full of supplies and food was accidentally burned. It took three weeks for Harper and Fredson to go to and return from base camp to replace their supplies.

The next step was the northeast ridge (later named the Karstens Ridge in the guide's honor). A previous expedition had called it "step [sic], but practicable," so Karstens and Stuck were surprised to find huge chunks of rocks and ice in their path. These had been upturned by an earthquake the previous summer. The expedition's progress slowed considerably while they maneuvered under, over, or sometimes through the debris. They camped on the ridge for three days, where temperatures ranged from 50 °F (10 °C) during the day to −21 °F (−29 °C) at night. It took them three weeks to dig a road three miles long through the blockage of materials in their path. The party the year before had passed this area easily before the earthquake.

After that, they climbed the upper glacier. Looking at the North Summit through field glasses, they saw a flagstaff set up by Thomas Lloyd and three other men; his party had reached it three years earlier. Known as the "Sourdough Expedition", Lloyd's party had found their achievement doubted because others had not witnessed it.

On June 6, the Karstens-Stuck party made their final camp at an elevation of 18,000 feet (5,500 m). At the time, it was the highest camp ever established in North America. At 4:00 the next morning, the group left camp for their final attempt at the summit. Around noon, they stopped briefly in a small shelter. The remaining 1,000 feet (300 m) went very slowly because the thin air made breathing difficult; they had to stop every few steps to catch their breath. At about 1:30 P.M., they reached the summit of Denali, an elevation of 20,310 feet (6,190 m). They spent an hour and a half on the summit, during which Robert Tatum planted the American flag he had made earlier from red, white, and blue handkerchiefs. Tatum said, "The scenery was of indescribable beauty...It was like looking out of a window of heaven."

After reading their instruments and calculating the altitude, they began their descent. In contrast to the 50-day journey up the mountain, the trip back to base camp took only two days. The expedition returned to Tanana on June 20, three months and four days after they left. While they were still at base camp, Stuck sent out a messenger to announce their success, claiming credit as leader of the expedition, and it was published in The New York Times on June 21. According to Tom Walker's 2013 biography of Karstens, he and Stuck had a falling out a short time after the climb was completed, and cut off relations, Karstens even calling him an "absolute paresite [sic] & liar." Karstens' role in the expedition became obscured, and Stuck received most of the publicity.

== Later life ==
Highly recommended by Charles Sheldon, Karstens was appointed as the first superintendent of the newly established Denali National Park, serving from 1921 to his resignation in October 1928. The park received no funds for administration until that year. During his tenure, Karstens developed improved infrastructure, such as roads in the park. He organized ranger patrols with sled dogs to reduce poaching of game. He also supervised the construction of cabins for use by the rangers, of which the Riley Creek Ranger Cabin No. 20 is an example. Built in 1931 after Karstens had left, it has been listed on the National Register of Historic Places. In 1923 he joined President Warren G. Harding during his visit to the park.

== Legacy ==
- In 1913, Stuck named the Karstens Ridge in the guide's honor. It is located in Denali National Park, 4.5 miles (7.2 km) east of the summit of Denali.
- In 1946, climber Bradford Washburn named the Karstens Col in his honor. The 10,930-foot (3,330 m) high pass is located between Mount Koven and the Karstens Ridge.
