= Mount Tatum =

Mountain in Alaska, U.S.

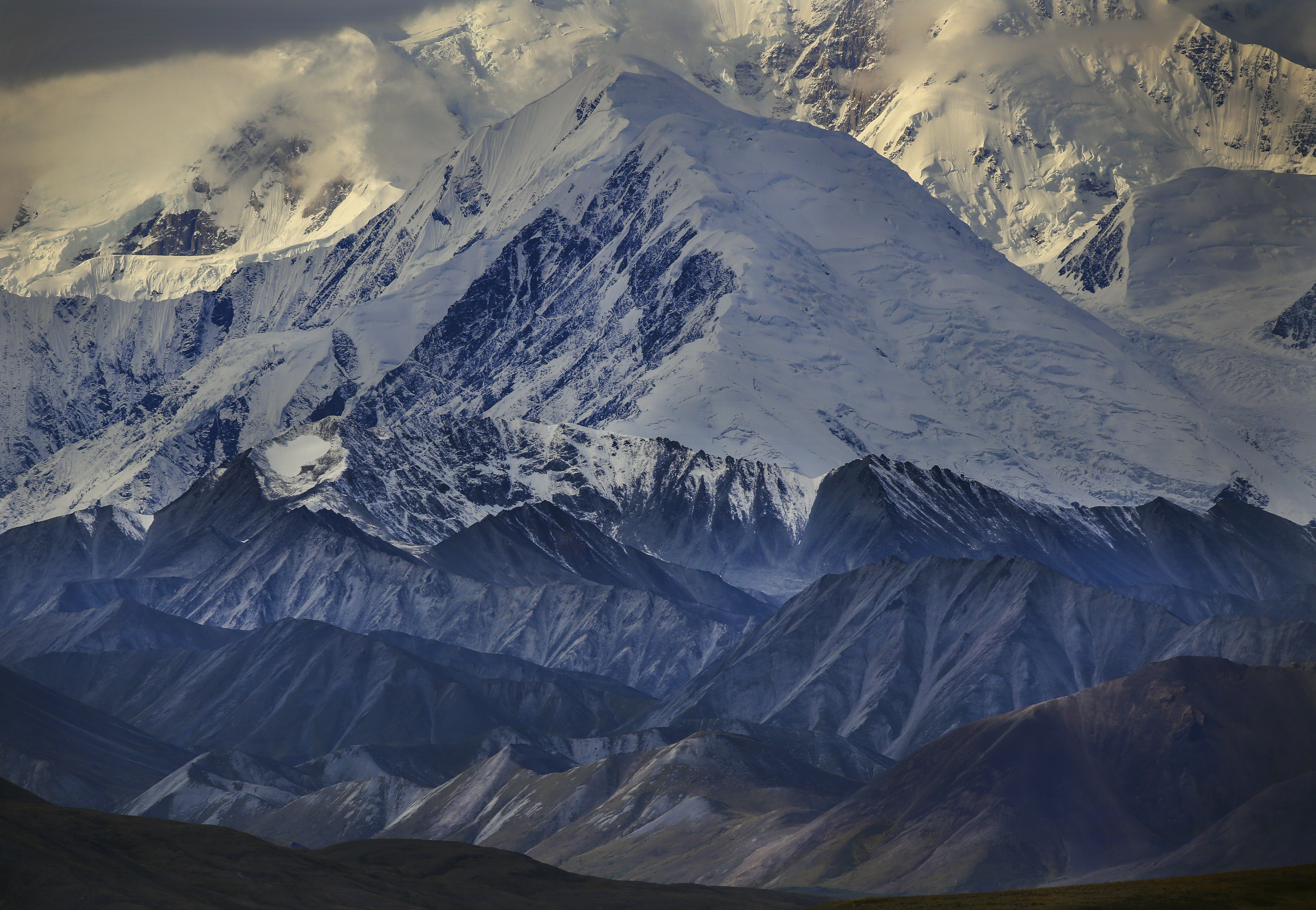
- Tatum in front of Carpe with Denali in back

Highest point
- Elevation: 11,140 ft (3,395 m)
- Prominence: 1,440 ft (439 m)
- Parent peak: Mount Carpe
- Coordinates: 63°10′49″N 150°48′28″W

Geography
- Location within Alaska
- Location: Denali Borough; Alaska, United States
- Parent range: Alaska Range
- Topo map: USGS Mount McKinley A-2

Climbing
- Easiest route: Southeast ridge

Mount Tatum is an 11,140-foot (3,395 m) mountain summit in the Alaska Range, in Denali National Park and Preserve. Mount Tatum lies to the northeast of Denali on Carpe Ridge with Muldrow Glacier to the west and Traleika Glacier to the east. Mount Tatum was named about 1945 by Bradford Washburn for Robert G. Tatum, a participant in the first ascent of Mount McKinley, reaching the South Peak on June 1, 1913.

== Gallery ==
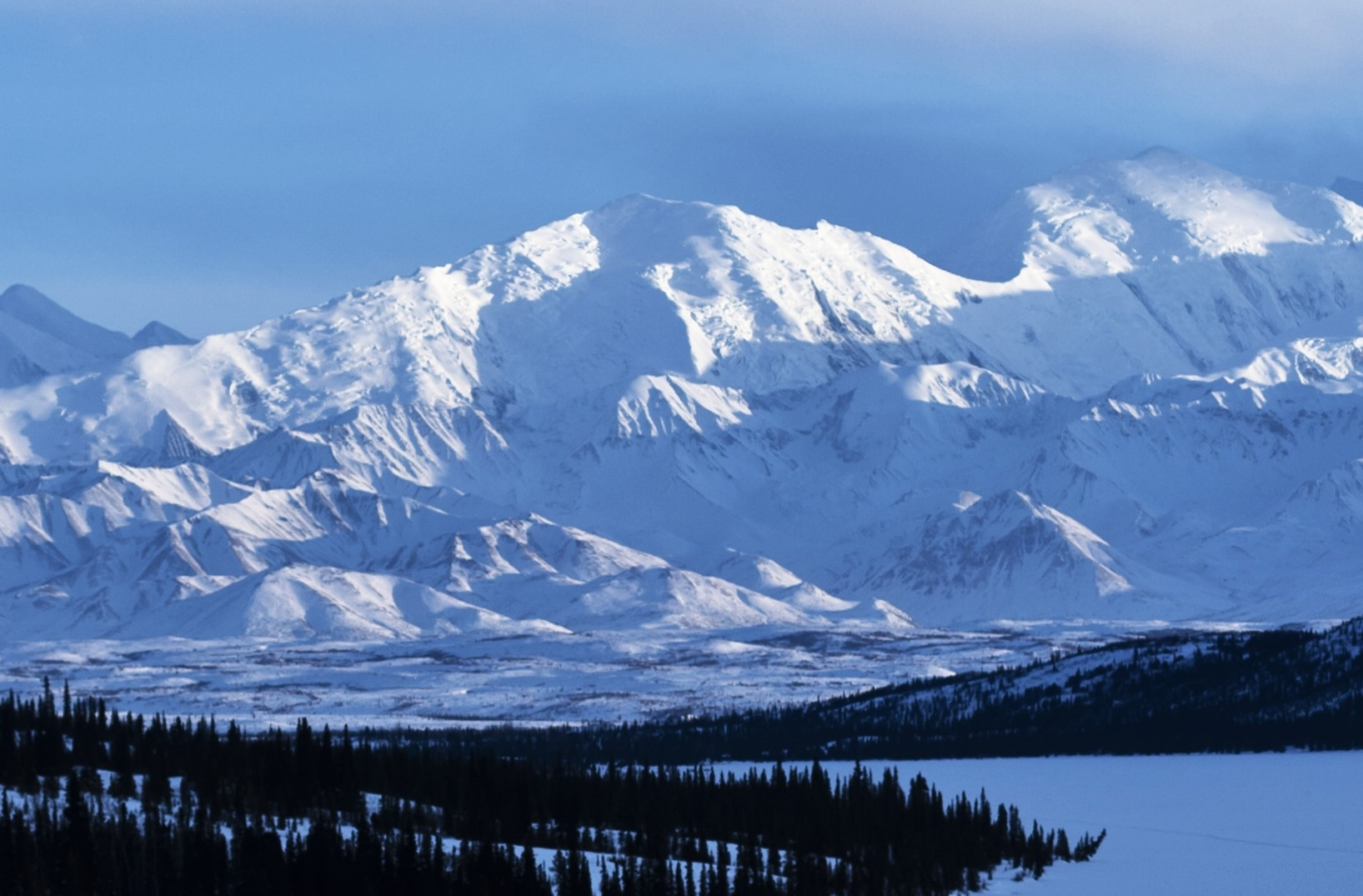
North aspect

== See also ==
- Mountain peaks of Alaska
