= Mount Fairweather =

Highest mountain in British Columbia, Canada

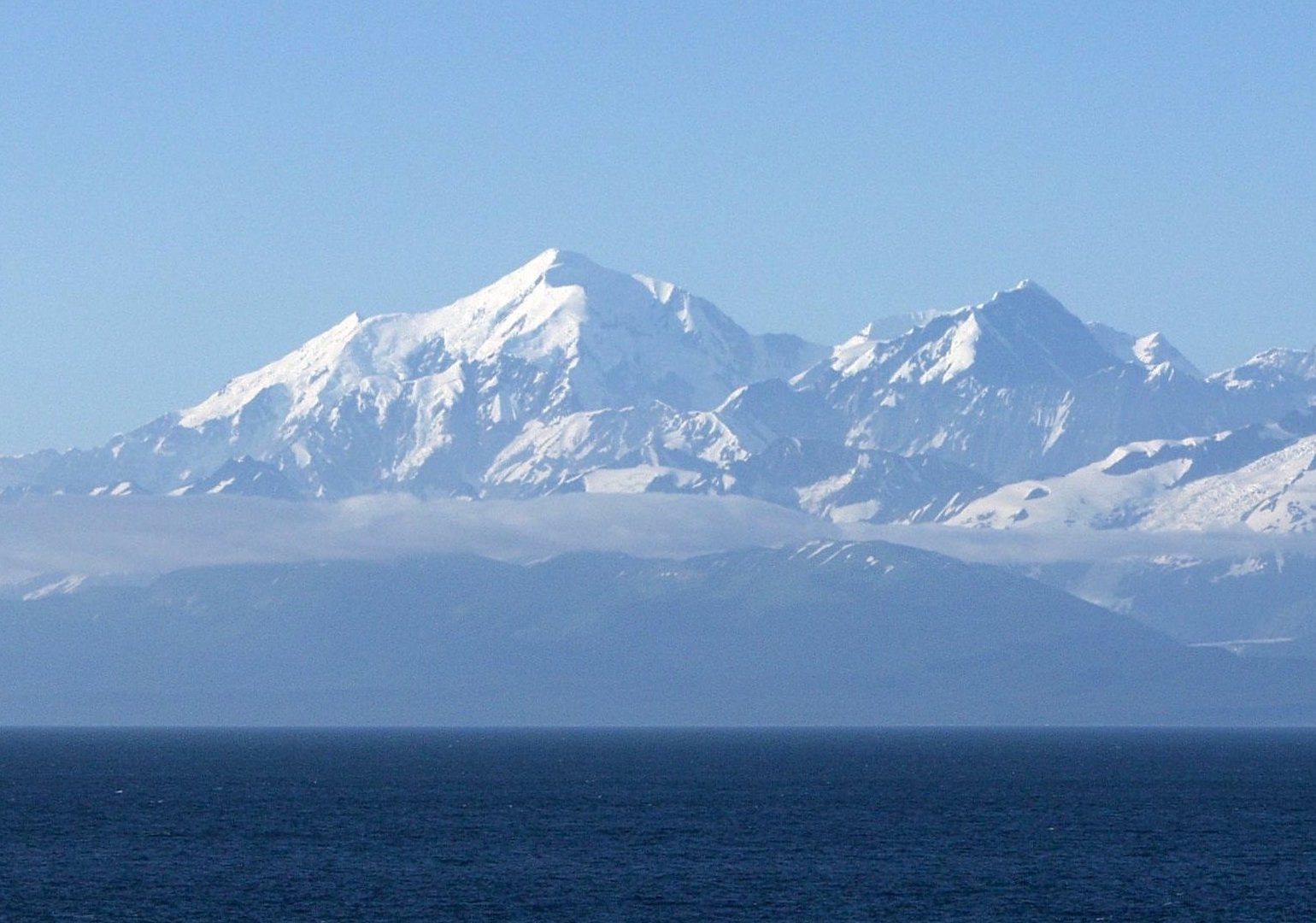
- Mount Fairweather (left) with Mount Quincy Adams (right) from the Pacific Ocean, 2001.

Highest point
- Elevation: 4,671 m (15,325 ft); NAVD88
- Prominence: 3,951 m (12,963 ft); Ranked 26th
- Isolation: 200 km (120 mi)
- Listing: Mountains of British Columbia 1st; North America highest peaks 18th; North America prominent peaks 6th; North America isolated peaks 106th; Canada highest major peaks 9th; US highest major peaks 7th; Canadian subnational high points 2nd
- Coordinates: 58°54′23″N 137°31′36″W

Geography
- Location within Alaska Location within British Columbia
- Interactive map of Mount Fairweather
- Location: Glacier Bay National Park and Preserve, Alaska / Stikine Region, British Columbia
- Parent range: Fairweather Range
- Topo map: NTS 114I13

Climbing
- First ascent: June 8, 1931 by Allen Carpé and Terris Moore
- Easiest route: glacier/snow/ice climb

Mount Fairweather (Note: Officially gazetted as Fairweather Mountain in Canada, also designated as Boundary Peak 164 or US/Canada Boundary Point #164.) is a mountain located 20 km (12 mi) east of the Pacific Ocean on the Canada–United States border. With an elevation of 4,653 metres (15,266 ft), it is the tallest mountain in British Columbia and the seventh-tallest mountain in both Alaska and the United States.

Fairweather is part of the Saint Elias Mountains and mostly lies within Glacier Bay National Park and Preserve, though the summit borders Tatshenshini-Alsek Provincial Park. After a failed attempt in 1926, Fairweather was first climbed in 1931 by Allen Carpé and Terris Moore.

== Naming ==
The name for the mountain came from Captain James Cook, on May 3, 1778 apparently for the unusually good weather encountered at the time.

The mountain has also gained several names from different languages:

- "Mt. Beautemps" by La Perouse (1786, atlas)
- "Mte. Buen-tiempo" by Galiano (1802, map 3)
- "Gor[a]-Khoroshy-pogody" on Russian Hydrographic Dept. Chart 1378 in 1847
- "G[ora] Fayerveder" by Captain Tebenkov (1852, map 7), Imperial Russian Navy
- "Schönwetterberg" by Constantin Grewingk in 1850
- "Schönwetter Berg" by Justus Perthes in 1882

== Geography ==
Mount Fairweather is located right above Glacier Bay in the Fairweather Range of the Saint Elias Mountains. Mount Fairweather also marks the northwest extremity of the Alaska Panhandle.

Like many peaks in the St. Elias Mountains, Mount Fairweather has great vertical relief due to its dramatic rise from Glacier Bay. However, due to often inclement weather in the area, this effect is usually obscured with the clouds which often hides the summit from view.

== Weather ==
Despite its name, Mount Fairweather has generally harsh weather conditions, especially in the winter months, affected by intense North Pacific low pressure systems arriving from the Gulf of Alaska. It receives over 100 inches (250 cm) of precipitation each year (mostly snow) and sees temperatures of around −50 °F (−46 °C).

== Climbing history ==
No documented attempt at climbing the mountain had been successful until 1931.

- 1926 Allen Carpe, Andy Taylor and W.S. Ladd reached 2,890 m (9,480 ft) on the West Ridge, but were forced back due to a steep notch in the ridge that made ferrying supplies very difficult.
- 1930 Bradford Washburn also made an attempt on the West Ridge but traveling conditions forced a retreat at 2,040 metres (6,690 ft).
- 1931 Allen Carpe and Terris Moore summited via the Southeast Ridge on June 8, 1931
- 1958 Paddy Sherman and 7 other Canadians reached the summit via the SE Ridge on June 26, 1958.
- 1968 West Ridge, Loren Adkins, Walter Gove, Paul Myhre, John Neal and Kent Stokes – summit reached June 12, 1968
- 1973 Southwest Ridge, Peter Metcalf, Henry Florschutz, Toby O'Brien and Lincoln Stoller. Summit reached on July 10, 1973.
- 1981 Southeast Ridge from the ocean, Gary Clark, Kim Grandfield, David Lunn. 19 days from Sea Otter Beach and back, Summit reached on May 31, bivouac in crevasse under summit.
- 1989 East-Southeast Ridge, Jim Haberl, Kevin Haberl, Michael Down, Alastair Foreman. Summit reached on May 26.

=== First documented ascent ===
After failing to reach the summit in 1926 due to terrain difficulty on their chosen route, Allen Carpe, W.S. Ladd, Andy Taylor returned in 1931 along with a new member Terris Moore. In early April the group began their approach by boat but stormy weather delayed them rounding Cape Fairweather until April 17. They reached Lituya Bay and unloaded their supplies on the beach. Backtracking 21 kilometres (13 mi) along the coast, they made their way to the Fairweather Glacier. From base camp in a spot they called Paradise Valley, they decided to attempt the mountain from the south rather than via the west ridge. Due to deep snow, they realized that skis and snowshoes would be of great help so Carpe and Moore made the 80 km (50 mi) round trip to fetch them from Lituya Bay.

They ascended the glacier from base camp and set up camp at 1,520 m (4,987 ft) on the mountain's south face. On May 25, they established high camp at 2,740 m (8,990 ft) after making significant progress up a ridge on a rare day of good weather. However, the weather turned and they were forced to descend after an overnight coating of snow. After waiting out the snowstorm for six days at lower camp, they made their way back up to high camp on June 2. They left for the summit at 1:30 am on June 3 and having reached the southeast shoulder by mid-morning, they were feeling so confident that they left the willow wands behind. However, higher altitude and the weeks of hard effort slowed their progress and then the weather changed. By 1 pm not far from the summit, they decided to retreat and had to descend without the wands to guide them. They managed to reach the tents by 4 pm. Ladd and Taylor volunteered to descend due to dwindling supplies at high camp with the hope that Carpe and Moore would be able to make another attempt in good weather. The storm raged for four days before it finally cleared in the evening on June 7. At 10 pm, Carpe and Moore set out for the summit and with no further difficulties made it to the top.

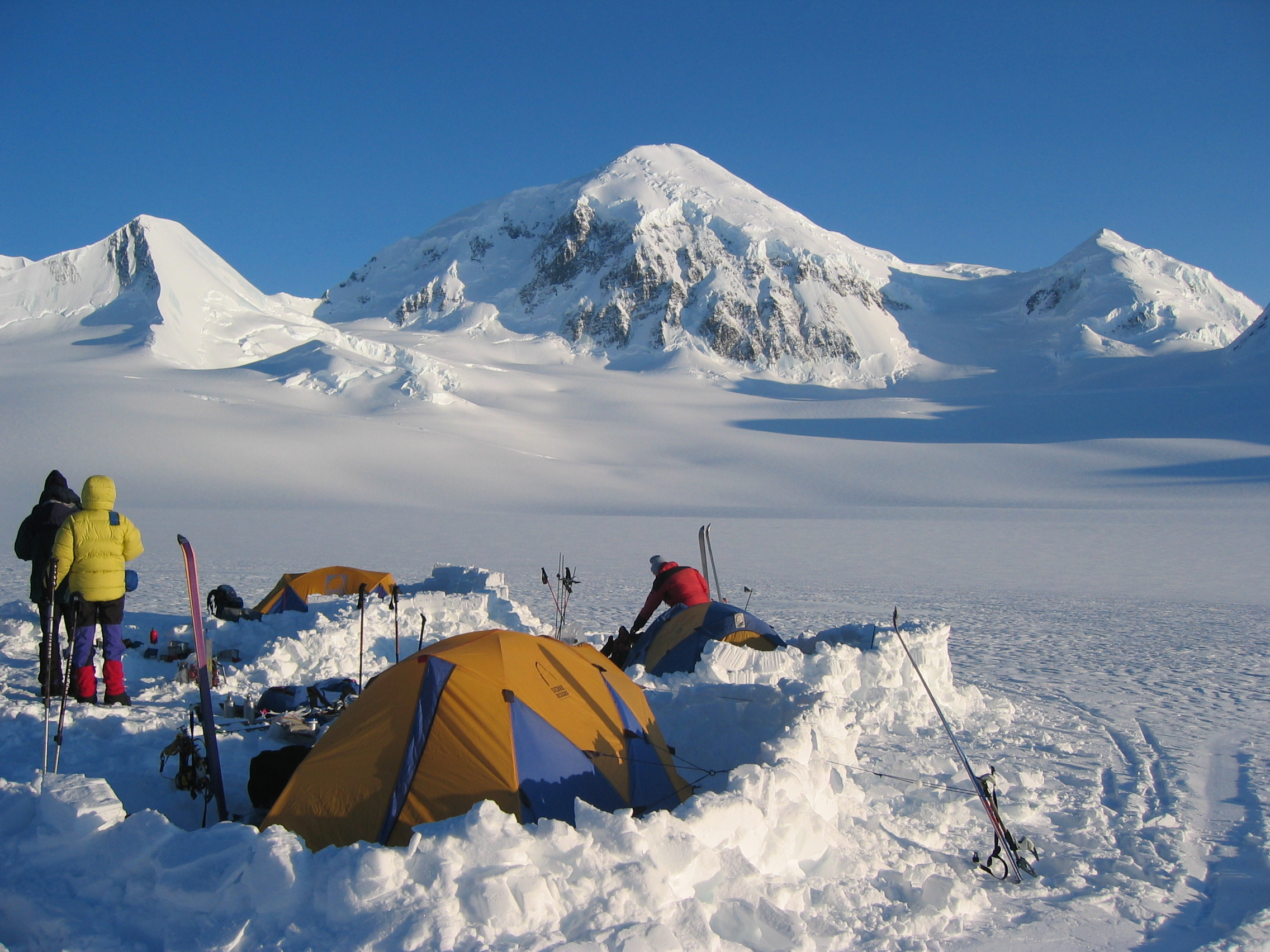
North face of Mt. Fairweather (centre)

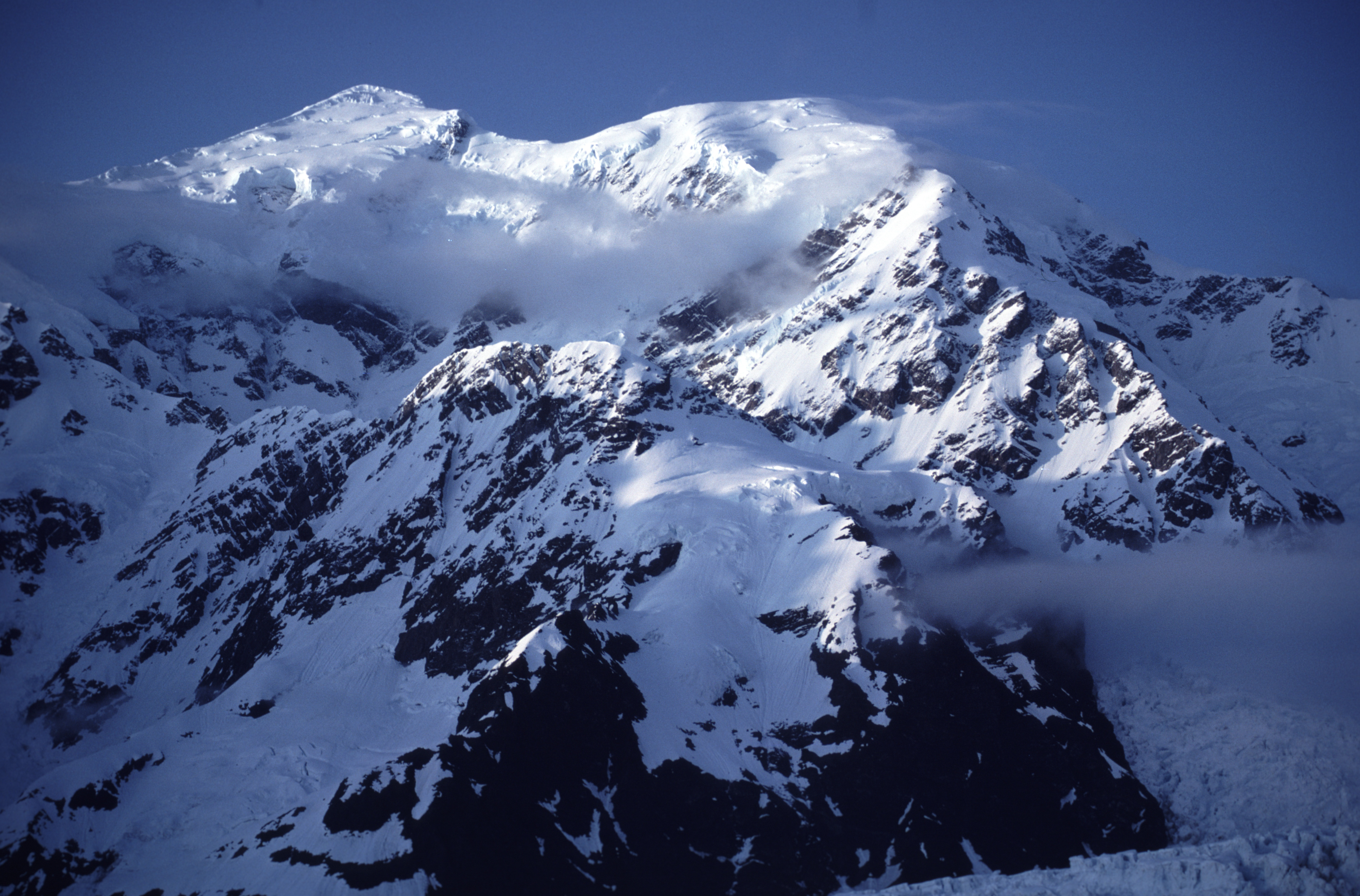
Southeast ridge (Carpé) rises from right side of photo

== See also ==
- List of mountain peaks of North America
  - List of mountain peaks of Canada
  - List of mountain peaks of the United States
- List of Boundary Peaks of the Alaska–British Columbia/Yukon border
- NOAA Ship Fairweather
