= Mount Bona =

Mountain in the U.S. state of Alaska

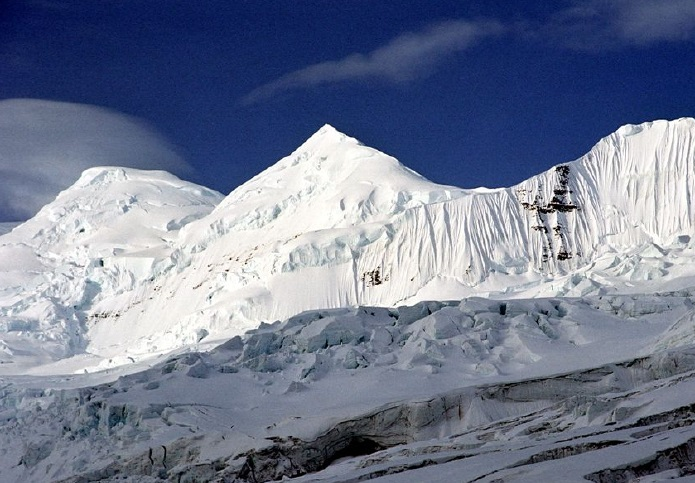

Highest point
- Elevation: 16,550 ft (5,040 m); NAVD88
- Prominence: 6,900 ft (2,100 m)
- Isolation: 49.7 mi (80.0 km)
- Listing: North America highest peaks 10th; North America prominent peak 84th; US highest major peaks 4th; Alaska highest major peaks 4th
- Coordinates: 61°23′08″N 141°44′55″W

Geography
- Location within Alaska
- Interactive map of Mount Bona
- Location: Wrangell–St. Elias National Park and Preserve, Alaska, U.S.
- Parent range: Saint Elias Mountains
- Topo map: USGS McCarthy B-2

Geology
- Mountain type: Stratovolcano
- Last eruption: 847 AD

Climbing
- First ascent: July 2, 1930 by Allen Carpé, Terris Moore, Andrew Taylor
- Easiest route: Glacier climb (Alaska Grade 2)

Mount Bona is one of the major mountains of the Saint Elias Mountains in eastern Alaska, and is the fifth-highest independent peak in the United States. (Note: This counts both the North and South Peaks of Denali (Mount McKinley), which is not a universally accepted practice. See Fourteener.) It is either the tenth- or eleventh-highest peak in North America. Mount Bona and its adjacent neighbor Mount Churchill are both large ice-covered stratovolcanoes. Bona has the distinction of being the highest volcano in the United States and the fourth-highest in North America, outranked only by the three highest Mexican volcanoes, Pico de Orizaba, Popocatépetl, and Iztaccíhuatl. Its summit is a small stratovolcano on top of a high platform of sedimentary rocks.

The mountain's massif is covered almost entirely by icefields and glaciers, and it is the principal source of ice for the Klutlan Glacier, which flows east for over 40 miles (64 km) into the Yukon Territory of Canada. The mountain also contributes a large volume of ice to the north-flowing Russell Glacier system.

Mount Bona was named by Prince Luigi Amedeo, Duke of the Abruzzi in 1897, who saw the peak while making the first ascent of Mount Saint Elias about 80 miles (130 km) to the southeast. He named it after the Bona, his racing yacht. The mountain was first climbed in 1930 by Allen Carpé, Terris Moore, and Andrew Taylor, from the Russell Glacier on the west of the peak. The current standard route is the East Ridge; a climb of nearby Mount Churchill is a relatively easy addition via this route as well.

== Elevation ==
Mount Bona's exact elevation is uncertain. USGS 1:250,000 topographical maps show an elevation of 16,421 feet (5,005 m), which was determined in 1913 by International Boundary Commission surveyors. However, USGS 1:63,360 topographical maps do not show a spot height, and their contour lines indicate a summit elevation of 16,550±50 feet (5045±15 meters). Many sources quote the latter figure.

== Gallery ==
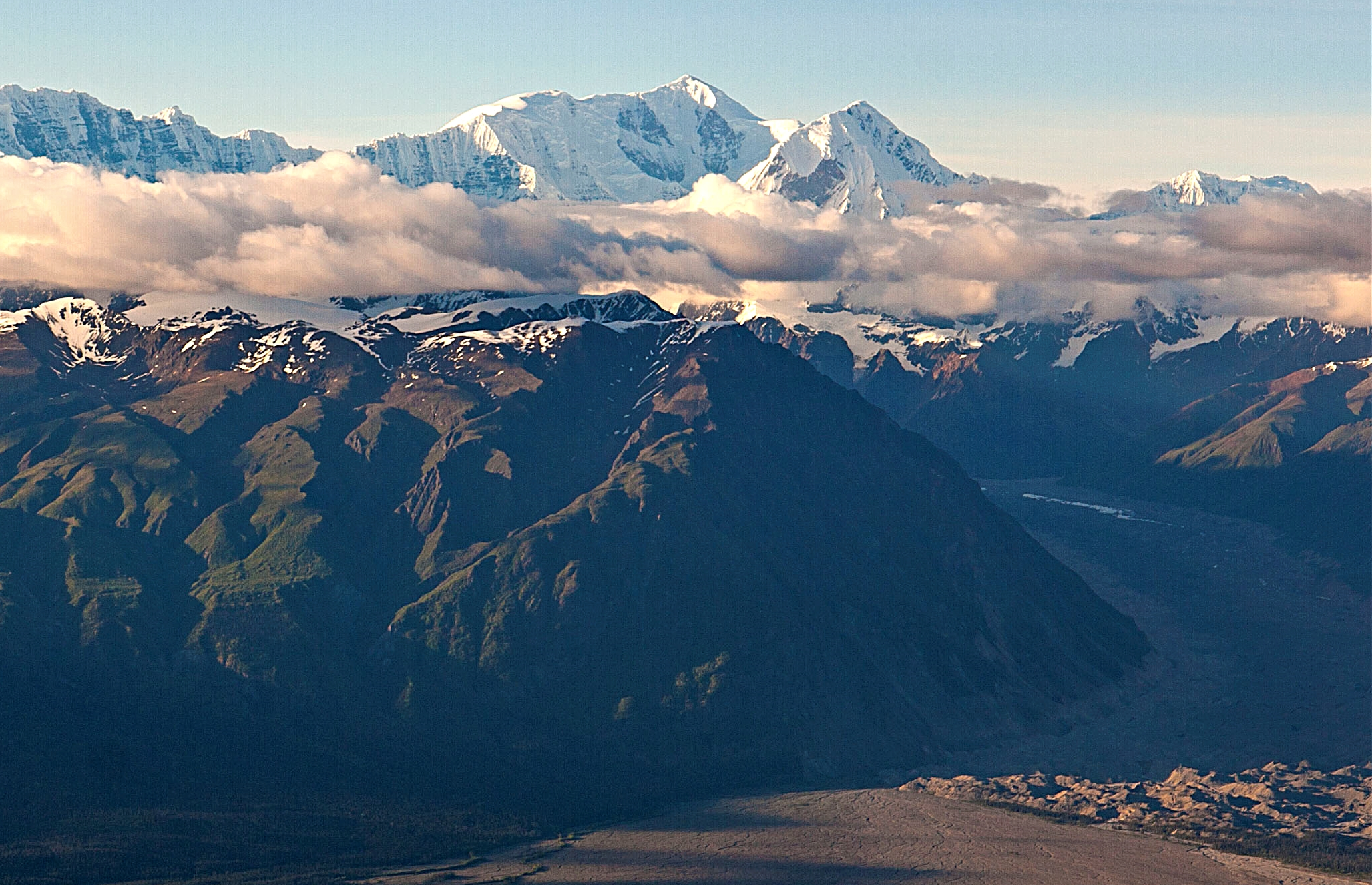
Mount Bona from the south

== See also ==
- List of mountain peaks of North America
  - List of mountain peaks of the United States
    - List of mountain peaks of Alaska
- List of the highest major summits of the United States
- List of the most prominent summits of the United States
- List of the most isolated major summits of the United States
- List of volcanoes in the United States

== References and notes ==
=== Further reading ===
- Richter, Donald H.; Rosenkrans, Danny S.; Steigerwald, Margaret J. (1995). Guide to the Volcanoes of the Western Wrangell Mountains, Alaska (PDF). USGS Bulletin 2072.
- Richter, Donald H.; Preller, Cindi C.; Labay, Keith A.; Shew, Nora B. (2006). Geologic Map of the Wrangell-Saint Elias National Park and Preserve, Alaska. USGS Scientific Investigations Map 2877.
- Winkler, Gary R. (2000). A Geologic Guide to Wrangell—Saint Elias National Park and Preserve, Alaska: A Tectonic Collage of Northbound Terranes. USGS Professional Paper 1616. ISBN 0-607-92676-7.
- Wood, Charles A.; Kienle, Jürgen, eds. (1990). Volcanoes of North America. Cambridge University Press. ISBN 0-521-43811-X.
