= Walter Harper =

American mountain climber (1893–1918)

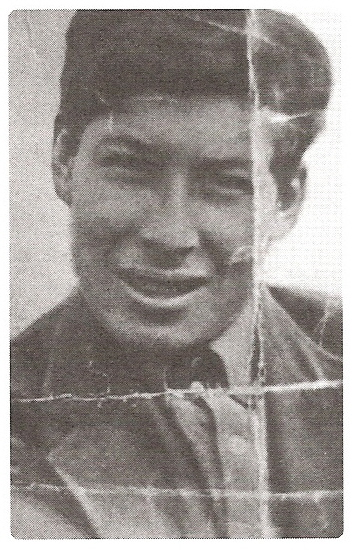
- Harper in 1913

Personal information
- Born: 1893 Tanana, District of Alaska
- Died: October 25, 1918 (aged 24–25) Lynn Canal, Territory of Alaska

Climbing career
- Type of climber: Mountain climber
- Major ascents: Denali (June 7, 1913)

Walter Harper (1893 – October 25, 1918) was a mountain climber and guide of mixed white and Alaska Native ancestry. On Saturday, 7 June 1913, he was the first person to reach the summit of Denali (Mount McKinley), the highest mountain in North America. He was followed by the other members of the small expedition team, guide Harry Karstens, Episcopal archdeacon Hudson Stuck, who had organized the effort, and Episcopal missionary Robert Tatum.

After gaining more formal education, Harper married in 1918 and planned to attend medical school in Philadelphia. He and his wife took the steamer SS Princess Sophia from Skagway to Seattle for their honeymoon before setting off cross-country. The ship ran aground on a reef in a snowstorm, and was broken up in a gale, sinking on October 25. All 268 passengers and 75 crew were lost.

== Early life and education ==
The youngest of eight children, Walter Harper was born in 1893 as the son of Arthur Harper, an immigrant from County Antrim, Ireland, and Jennie Seentahna (née Bosco) Harper, of the Koyukon people from the Koyukuk region. They married in 1874 when Harper was 39 and Jennie was 14, at Koyukuk. Harper and his partner Al Mayo founded a trading post in Tanana, near the Athabascan site of Nuklukayet. Harper also did some mining there, after years of experience in California and British Columbia. Mayo married Margaret, a cousin of Jennie.

The couple separated permanently in 1895, and Arthur Harper left the area. He died of tuberculosis in 1897. Jennie reared Walter as a Koyukon. All the older Harper children had been sent for education to boarding schools "Outside", mostly in San Francisco, California. Harper's partners also adopted this practice for their mixed-race children.

At the age of 16, Walter Harper started attending Tortella School, an Episcopal boarding school associated with St. Marks Mission in Nenana, Alaska. There he met Hudson Stuck, Episcopal archdeacon of the Yukon, who served a large area of the Interior as a missionary. Stuck was impressed by Harper's intelligence, manners, and skills in fishing, tracking, trapping, fire-building, and dog handling. He hired him to work as his interpreter, guide, and dog driver. He also encouraged him to continue with his formal education.

== Denali expedition ==
Stuck invited Harper, then 20, to be part of his 1913 expedition to climb Denali. Others in the party were the chief guide and co-director Harry Peter Karstens; Robert Tatum, an Episcopal missionary, who served as cook; and two Gwich'in teenagers, Johnny Fredson and Esaias George, who helped prepare and maintain the base camp. This pair also brought the dog teams down when the terrain became too rough for their use.

On March 17, 1913, the expedition left from Nenana to climb Denali. The first day, they hiked 30 miles (48 km) along the Tanana River valley with two sleds of supplies, pulled by fourteen dogs. The 110-mile (180 km) journey up the river to Eureka took eight days; there, they replenished supplies and celebrated Easter.

It took them several weeks to reach their final camp; their journey had been much longer than expected. They had made it through the steep, crevasse-filled Muldrow Glacier, and endured a tent fire. It then took them three weeks to get through the Karstens Ridge, where the trail was blocked by huge rocks and blocks of ice thrown up by an earthquake the year before. They also survived a 50-foot (15 m) icefall. On June 6, they arrived at their final camp at an elevation of 18,000 feet (5,500 m), the highest camp ever established in North America.

At 4:00 a.m. the next morning, the climbers left camp for their final summit attempt. At 1:30 p.m., the party reached the top of Denali, an elevation of 20,310 feet (6,190 m). Harper was the first to gain the summit. The team spent an hour and a half on the summit, during which Tatum planted a flag he had made earlier from handkerchiefs. He compared the view to "looking out of a window of heaven". Stuck ensured they also put up a six-foot cross.

After taking readings from their instruments to establish the height of the mountain, the party began the descent. Compared to the 50-day journey up the mountain, it took them just two days to make it back to base camp. The expedition returned to Tanana on June 20, three months and four days after they'd left.

== Later life ==
Encouraged by Stuck, at age 21 Harper entered Mount Hermon School where he studied for two years, leaving in 1916. He continued his education in Alaska while continuing to work on the frontier, and planned to attend medical school in Philadelphia. On September 1, 1918, he married Frances Wells in Fort Yukon, with Archdeacon Stuck officiating. For their honeymoon, the couple took the SS Princess Sophia from Skagway to Seattle. From there, they would travel to Philadelphia, where Harper had been admitted to medical school, and his wife planned to join the Red Cross. They embarked on October 23 at Skagway, and the four-year-old Scottish steamer left at 10:00 that night.

A day later, as the ship was passing through Lynn Canal en route to Juneau, it encountered a strong gale and heavy snow. Princess Sophia went 1 mile (1.6 km) off course and ran aground on Vanderbilt Reef, the flat, rocky tip of an underwater mountain. Initially the sea was calm, but soon another gale began. The ship asked by radio for help, but neither ships nor small boats could get close enough to rescue the people aboard because of the dangerous conditions. After about 40 hours, Princess Sophia broke apart and sank on October 25, killing all 268 passengers and 75 crew, a total of 343 persons lost, including Walter and Frances.

After the Harpers' bodies were recovered, the couple was buried side by side in Juneau.

== Legacy ==
- In 1913, Archdeacon Stuck named Harper Glacier after the first man to reach the summit. The 4-mile-long (6.4 km) glacier runs from Denali Pass on Denali to the Great Icefall before becoming Muldrow Glacier. It was also named for Walter's father Arthur.
- On June 7, 2012, the 99th anniversary of the first ascent, Alaskan Senator Lisa Murkowski introduced bill S. 2273, to "designate the Talkeetna Ranger Station in Talkeetna, Alaska, as the Walter Harper Talkeetna Ranger Station."
- In 2020, Alaska State Senator Click Bishop introduced and saw passed Alaska SB 144, to have June 7 annually designated Walter Harper Day.
- On July 19, 2022, the Walter Harper Project unveiled a life-sized bronze statue of Walter Harper in downtown Fairbanks, Alaska.
