= Terris Moore =

American mountain climber (1908–1993)

- Born: April 11, 1908; Haddonfield, New Jersey
- Died: November 7, 1993 (aged 85); Cambridge, Massachusetts
- Education: Williams College; Harvard Business School
- Occupations: Explorer and mountaineer

Terris Moore (April 11, 1908 – November 7, 1993) was an explorer, mountaineer, light plane pilot, and the second president of the University of Alaska.

== Early years and education ==
Moore attended schools in Haddonfield, Philadelphia and New York, and was a graduate of Williams College in Massachusetts. He then received an MBA and the degree of Doctor of Commercial Science from the Harvard School of Business Administration. He taught at UCLA for two years, then returned to Boston to author textbooks on taxes and work as a financial consultant.

== Early career ==
Moore's career as a mountaineer started early, with an ascent of Chimborazo and the first ascent of Sangay, both in the Andes of Ecuador, in 1927. In the early 1930s, he made the first ascents of Mount Bona and Mount Fairweather, both major Alaskan peaks, with Allen Carpé, and he also made the first unguided ascent of Mount Robson in the Canadian Rockies.

== Most famous climb ==
These ascents led to his most famous climb, the first ascent (with Richard Burdsall) of Minya Konka, a 7,556 metres (24,790 ft) peak in Sichuan, China. Their small party (also including Arthur Emmons and Jack Young) also carefully surveyed the peak and settled a controversy about its height. In making the ascent the summit pair climbed a mountain thousands of feet higher than any other Americans had previously succeeded.

== Consultant and other work ==
During World War II Moore served as a consultant to the U.S. military on arctic and mountain conditions, and as a member of the Alaskan Test Expedition in 1942. In that capacity he made the third ascent of Denali. After the war, he was president of the New England Society of Natural History, which was deeply enmeshed with the Boston Museum of Science, headed by Bradford Washburn, also a noted climber of Alaskan peaks.

Moore served three years as the president of the University of Alaska, starting in 1949, and during that time he also established records for high-altitude airplane landings. Moore Residence Hall, which along with Bartlett Hall are two 8-story buildings anchoring the upper dorm complex on the Fairbanks campus, was named for him. Student radio station KSUA has its transmitter and tower atop Moore Hall.
