= Mount Carpe =

Mountain in Alaska, United States

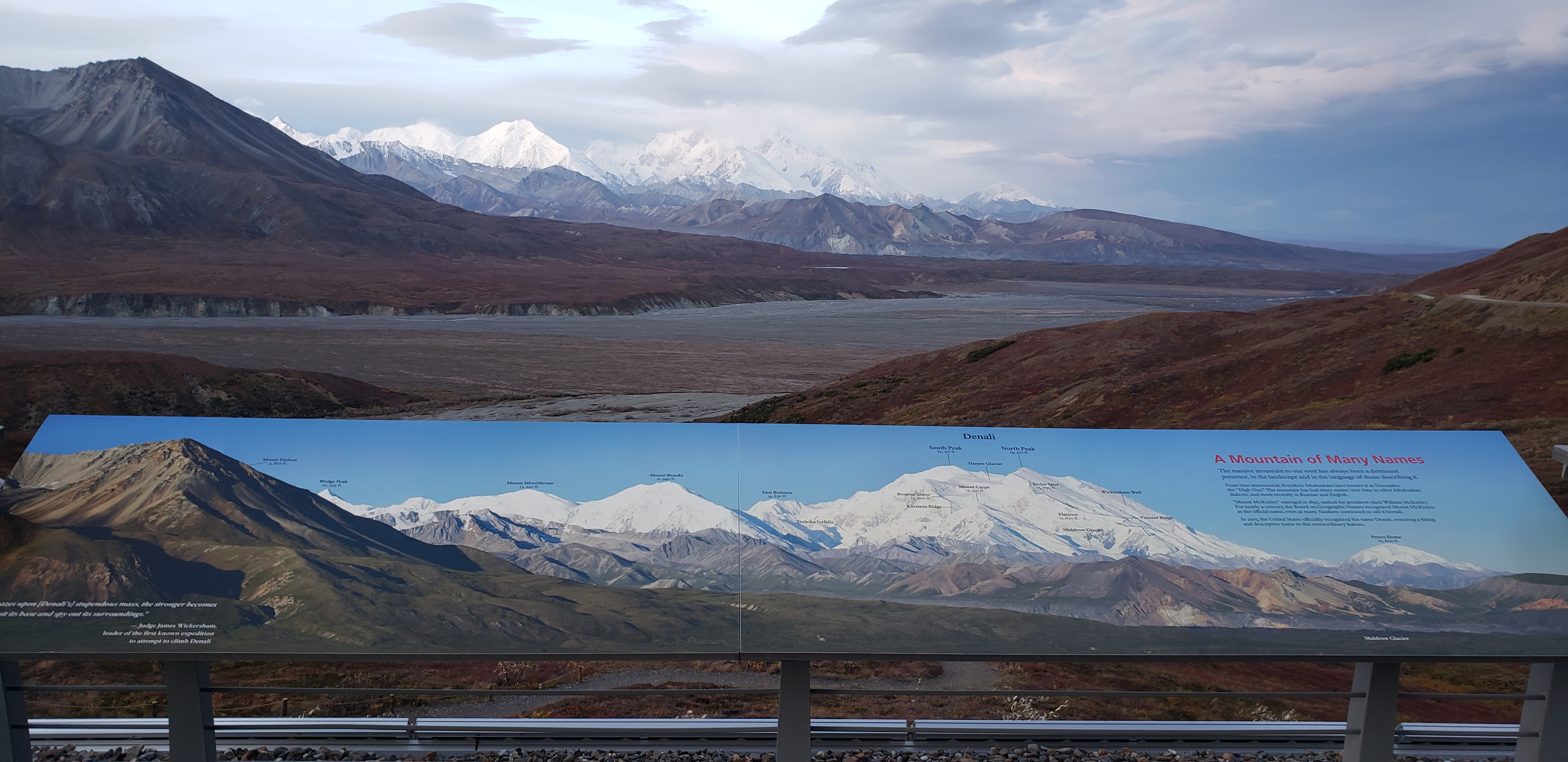

Highest point
- Elevation: 12,550 ft (3,825 m)
- Prominence: 1,800 ft (549 m)
- Parent peak: Denali
- Coordinates: 63°09′07″N 150°51′37″W

Geography
- Location within Alaska
- Location: Denali Borough; Alaska, United States
- Parent range: Alaska Range
- Topo map: USGS Mount McKinley A-2

Mount Carpe is a 12,550-foot (3,825 m) mountain summit in the Alaska Range, in Denali National Park and Preserve, on a northeast buttress of Denali. The Carpe Ridge includes Mount Tatum. Mount Carpe was named in 1943 by the U.S. Army Test Expedition after Allen Carpé, who was killed along with Theodore G. Koven (for whom Mount Koven is named), while on the Rockefeller Cosmic Ray Expedition in May 1932 when they fell into a crevasse on Muldrow Glacier.

== Gallery ==
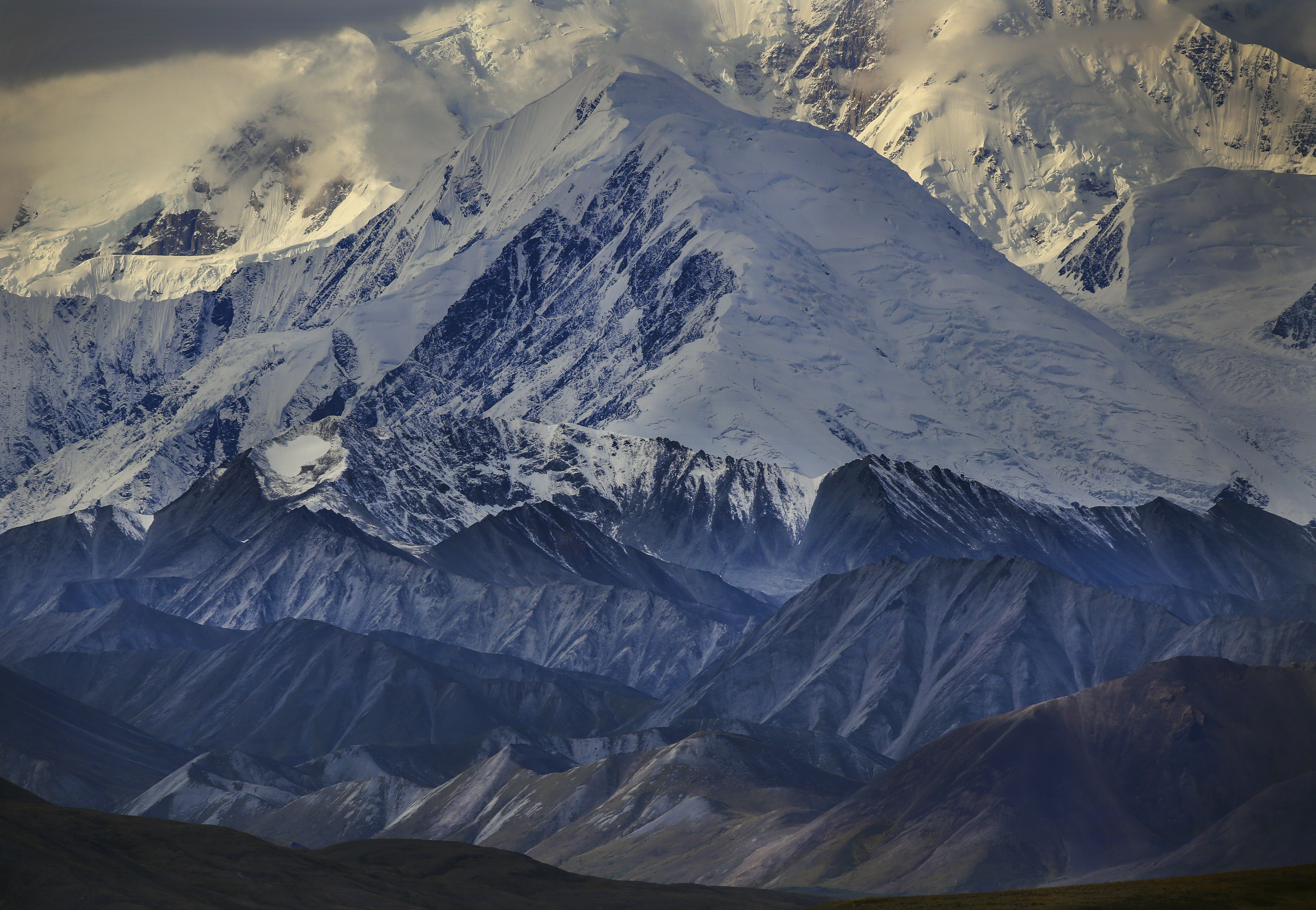
Tatum/Carpe with Denali behind

== See also ==
- Mountain peaks of Alaska
