= Allen Carpé =

American engineer and mountaineer (1894–1932)

- Born: December 20, 1894; Chicago, Illinois, U.S.
- Died: May 9, 1932 (aged 37); Mount McKinley, Alaska, U.S
- Education: Columbia University
- Occupations: Engineer; mountaineer
- Known for: namesake of Mount Carpe
- Relatives: Coates Kinney (grandfather)

Allen Carpé (December 20, 1894 – May 9, 1932) was an American engineer and mountaineer who is the namesake of Mount Carpe in Alaska. He and Terris Moore were the first to have reached the summit of Mount Bona and Mount Fairweather.

== Biography ==
Carpé was born in Chicago on December 20, 1894, and spent his early years in Xenia, Ohio. His father was a musician who died when Carpé was young and his mother, was the daughter of the poet Coates Kinney and a descendant of Ezra Cornell, founder of Western Union and Cornell University. Carpé was educated in Germany, and spent a year at the University of Berlin before entering Columbia University, graduating with a degree in electrical engineering. He developed an interest in mountain climbing during his days in Germany, when he would spend his holidays in the Alps and the Carpathian Mountains.

His studies were interrupted by World War I, where he fought in the Battle of Saint-Mihiel and was gassed in action and was wounded slightly.

In 1920, Carpé joined the American Telephone and Telegraph Company as a member of the department of development and research.

In 1925, he was a member of the expedition that made the first ascent to Mount Logan. In 1930, he made the first ascent of Mount Bona with Terris Moore. 1931, he became the first person to climb Mount Fairweather.

He died on May 9, 1932, during an expedition to Mount Mckinley, which was carried out for the purpose of studying cosmic ray observations for Professor Arthur Compton at the University of Chicago.
