= Traleika Glacier =

Glacier in Alaska, United States

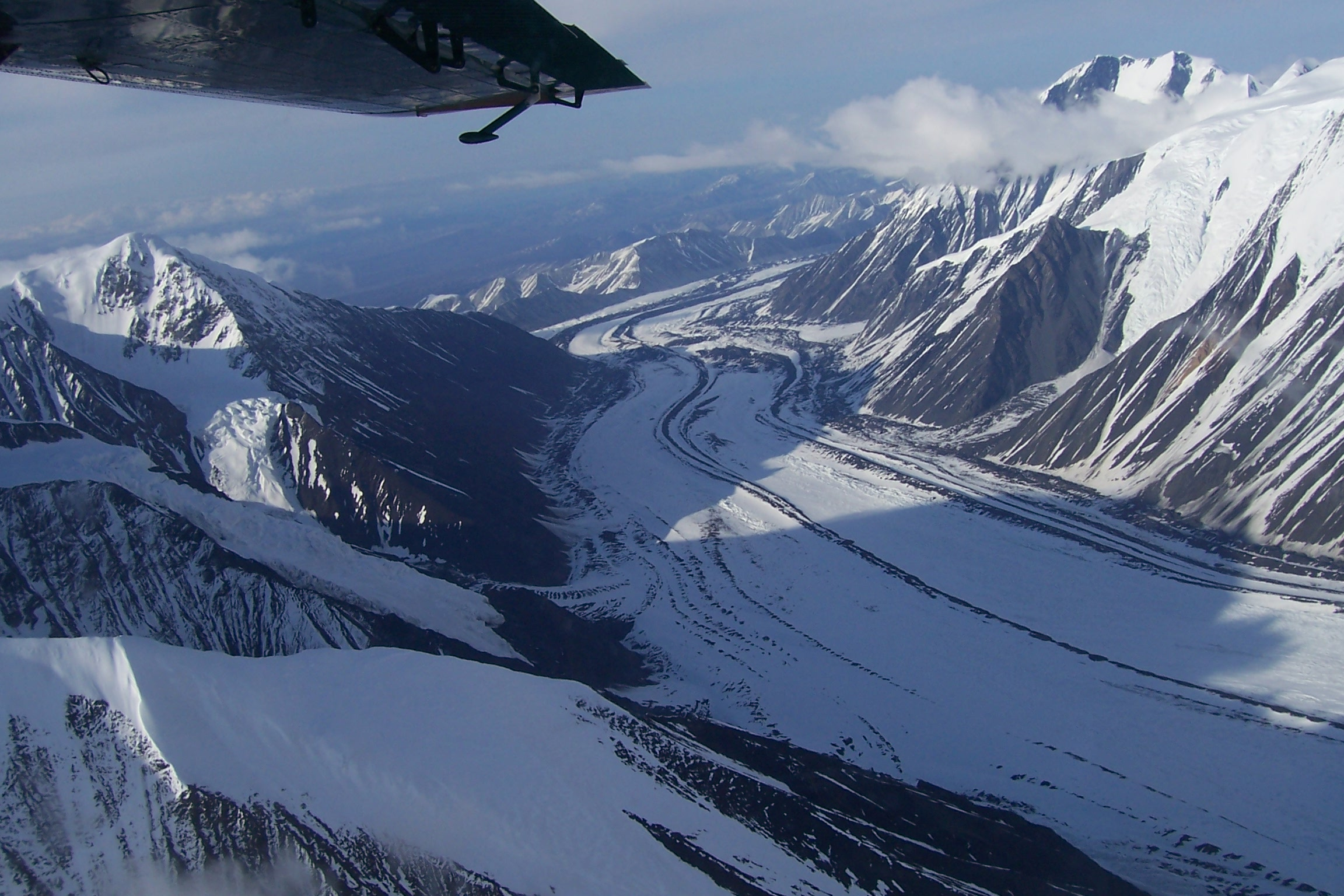
- Aerial view looking north

- Location within Alaska
- Interactive map of Traleika Glacier
- Type: Valley glacier
- Location: Denali Borough, Alaska, U.S.
- Coordinates: 63°09′N 150°47′W

Traleika Glacier is a glacier in Denali National Park and Preserve in the U.S. state of Alaska. The glacier originates from two forks on either side of Farthing Horn on the east side of Denali. The west fork of the glacier starts in the Thayer Basin to the south of Denali, moving northeast and falling from the basin's 15,000-foot (4,600 m) height via the Traleika Icefall into the west fork between Karsten Ridge and the Farthing Horn. The main fork starts from Denali's east buttress in Traleika Col, joining the West Fork between the Farthing Horn and Mount Silverthrone, then moving northeast to join Muldrow Glacier. Traleika Glacier was named in 1945 by Bradford Washburn, attributing the name to a Susitna name meaning "great one" or "high one." . The form Traleika is an Anglicization of the Dena'ina name Dghelaay Ka'a, denoting Denali.

== See also ==
- List of glaciers
