= Muldrow Glacier =

Glacier in Alaska, United States

- McKinley Glacier
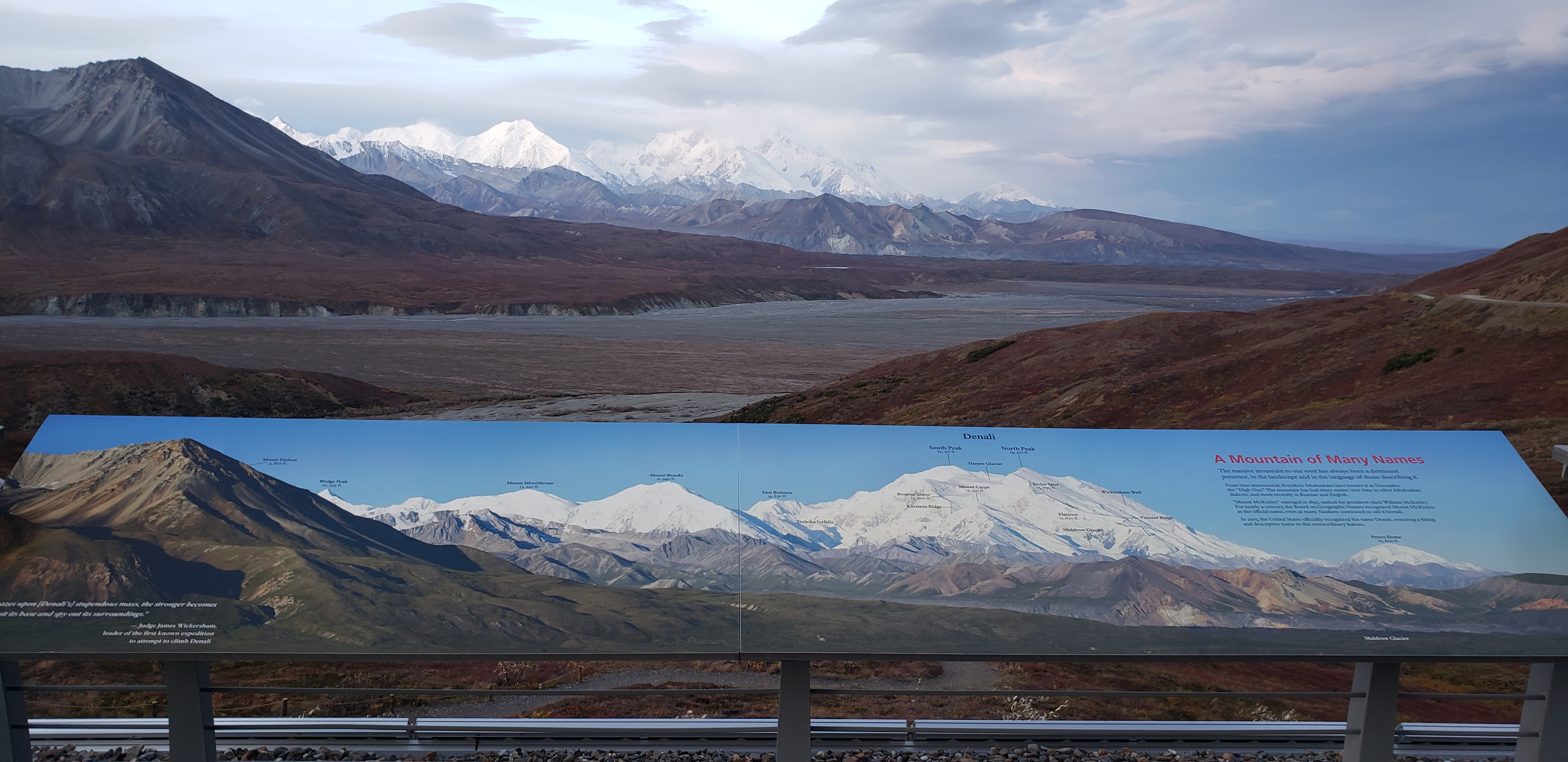
- View from the Eielson Visitor Center, Denali Nation Park. Muldrow Glacier is located on the right edge of the visible mountains.

- Location within Alaska
- Interactive map of Muldrow Glacier
- Type: Valley glacier
- Location: Denali Borough, Alaska, U.S.
- Coordinates: 63°15′38″N 150°26′14″W
- Status: growing

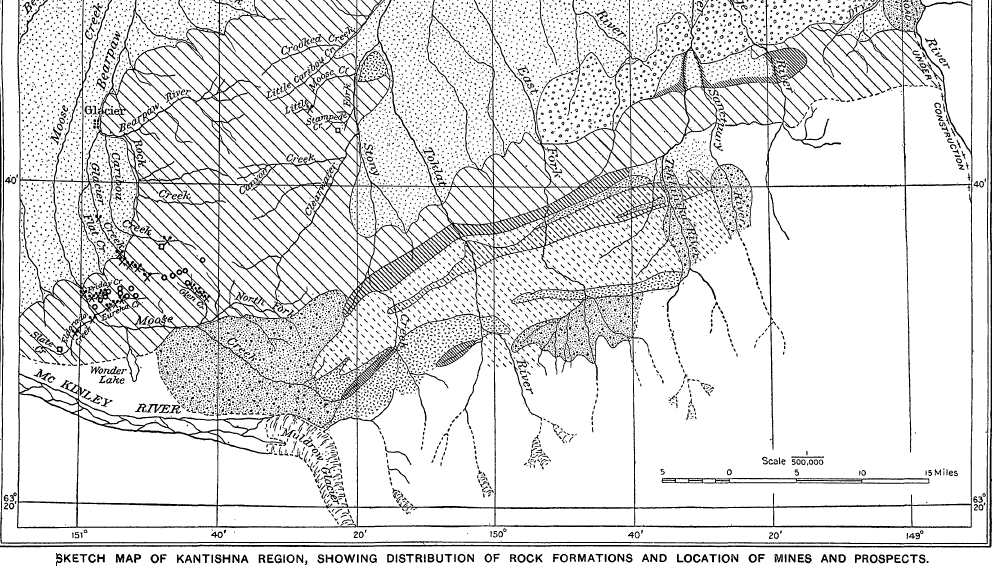
Kantishna Region geological map showing the location of the glacier.

Muldrow Glacier, also known as McKinley Glacier, is a large glacier in Denali National Park and Preserve in the U.S. state of Alaska. Native names for the glacier include, Henteel No' Loo' and Henteel No' Loot.

The glacier originates from the Great Icefall of Harper Glacier on the eastern side of Denali. The glacier moves generally eastward, receiving Traleika Glacier and Brooks Glacier as tributaries, then turning northward to emerge from the Alaska Range as the source of the McKinley River. Muldrow Glacier was renamed by Alfred Hulse Brooks in 1902 in honor of U.S. Geological Survey topographer Robert Muldrow.

In 2021, the glacier was noted to be growing in a surge that greatly exceeds the scant previous records of its status. In April that year scientists were documenting growth of the glacier at one hundred times its normal rate, advancing up to ninety feet a day during the prior few months.

== See also ==
- List of glaciers
