= List of mountains and mountain ranges of Denali National Park and Preserve =

Mountains in Denali National Park and Preserve are part of the Alaska Range, with several subsidiary ranges included within the overall Alaska Range. Denali (also known as Mount McKinley), is the highest peak in the park and the highest peak in North America at 20,320 feet (6,194 m) The names listed here reflect the official names in the USGS U.S. Board on Geographic Names database. They in most cases exclude subsidiary peaks of larger mountains — McKinley alone has dozens of prominent points above 15,000 feet. The final version of this list will include all named peaks in the park and preserve above 10,000 feet (3,000 m) and a selection of prominent named peaks of lesser height.

== Central Alaska Range ==
The central Alaska Range is dominated by the enormous Denali and its complex of subsidiary summits, spurs and buttresses. Of the other central Alaska Range summits, only Mount Foraker substantially exceeds 14,000 feet (4,300 m), and most prominent peaks are in the 10,000-foot (3,000 m) – 12,500-foot (3,800 m) range.

- Denali - 63°04′10″N 151°00′27″W; 20,310 feet (6,190.5 m)
- Kahiltna Dome - 63°03′18″N 151°14′11″W; 12,411 feet (3,783 m)
- Kahiltna Peaks - 62°57′39″N 151°23′53″W; 13,090 feet (3,990 m)
- The Mooses Tooth - 62°58′11″N 150°36′40″W; 10,082 feet (3,073 m)
- Mount Brooks - 63°11′16″N 150°38′50″W; 11,890 feet (3,620 m)
- Mount Capps - 63°04′47″N 151°11′17″W; 10,551 feet (3,216 m)
- Mount Carpe - 63°09′08″N 150°51′39″W; 12,552 feet (3,826 m)
- Mount Church - 62°52′45″N 150°41′00″W; 7,621 feet (2,323 m)
- Mount Crosson - 63°00′30″N 151°16′21″W; 12,352 feet (3,765 m)
- Mount Dall - 63°09′08″N 150°51′39″W; 12,552 feet (3,826 m)
- Mount Dan Beard - 63°01′13″N 150°47′13″W; 10,082 feet (3,073 m)
- Mount Deception - 63°09′30″N 150°31′51″W; 11,539 feet (3,517 m)
- Mount Eldridge - 63°08′05″N 150°20′48″W; 10,394 feet (3,168 m)
- Mount Foraker - 62°57′39″N 151°23′53″W; 17,342 feet (5,286 m)
- Mount Hayes - 63°37′12″N 146°42′58″W; 13,596 feet (4,144 m)
- Mount Hunter - 62°57′03″N 151°05′22″W; 14,091 feet (4,295 m)
- Mount Huntington - 62°58′04″N 150°53′07″W; 11,607 feet (3,538 m)
- Mount Koven - 63°08′01″N 150°53′44″W; 12,142 feet (3,701 m)
- Mount Mather - 63°14′41″N 150°26′08″W; 12,096 feet (3,687 m)
- Mount Pendleton - 63°24′54″N 149°42′48″W; 7,605 feet (2,318 m)
- Mount Russell - 62°47′56″N 151°52′55″W; 11,263 feet (3,433 m)
- Mount Silverthrone - 63°06′58″N 150°40′28″W; 12,867 feet (3,922 m)
- Mount Tatum - 63°10′49″N 150°48′28″W; 11,053 feet (3,369 m)
- Mount Tripyramid - 63°09′30″N 150°41′30″W; 10,682 feet (3,256 m)
- Ragged Peak - 63°12′01″N 150°32′54″W; 9,160 feet (2,792 m)
- Wedge Peak - 63°12′11″N 150°30′34″W; 9,941 feet (3,030 m)

== Kichatna Mountains ==
The Kichatna Mountains are a sub-range to the west of the central Alaska Range, notable for a complex of glacial arêtes that are collectively called the Cathedral Spires.

- Augustin Peak - 62°25′08″N 152°37′18″W; 8,514 feet (2,595 m)
- Gurney Peak - 62°24′51″N 152°41′16″W; 7,192 feet (2,192 m)
- Kichatna Spire - 62°25′25″N 152°43′24″W; 7,684 feet (2,342 m)
- Lewis Peak - 62°23′52″N 152°41′16″W; 6,624 feet (2,019 m)

== Alaska Range north of the Denali Park Road ==
The Alaska Range continues northeastward from the Denali massif, becoming lower north of the main park road.

- Polychrome Mountain - 63°32′11″N 149°57′40″W; 5,620 feet (1,710 m)
- Sable Mountain - 63°34′20″N 149°42′29″W; 5,994 feet (1,827 m)
- Igloo Mountain - 63°36′30″N 149°37′57″W; 4,800 feet (1,463 m)
- Mount Sheldon - 63°35′27″N 150°07′02″W; 5,686 feet (1,733 m)

== Kantishna Hills ==
- Brooker Mountain

== Primrose Ridge ==
- Mount Margaret
- Mount Wright
