= Polychrome (disambiguation) =

Polychrome is the practice of decorating architectural elements in different colours. It may also refer to:

== Arts ==
- Polychrome brickwork, the practice of decorating bricks in various colours
- Polychrome (Oz), a character in the Oz series of books
- Polychrome Pictures, a defunct American film distributor
- Nocturnals#Polychrome, a character in the Nocturnals comic book series

== Geography ==
- Polychrome Glaciers, a group of glaciers in Alaska
- Polychrome Historic District, an historic district in Silver Spring, Maryland
- Polychrome Mountain, a mountain in Alaska
