= Mount Tripyramid (Alaska) =

Mountain in Alaska, United States

- Location within Alaska

Highest point
- Elevation: 10,682 ft (3,256 m)
- Coordinates: 63°09′30″N 150°41′30″W

Geography
- Location: Denali Borough, Alaska, United States
- Parent range: Alaska Range
- Topo map: USGS Mount McKinley A-2

Mount Tripyramid is multi-summited mountain ridge in the Alaska Range, in Denali National Park and Preserve. The main ridge extends along a southwest–northeast line with West Pyramid Peak (11,699 feet (3,566 m)), Central Pyramid Peak (11,247 feet (3,428 m)) and East Pyramid Peak (11,161 feet (3,402 m)). Mount Brooks ends the ridge to the north and Mount Silverthrone is to the south. The ridge is bounded by Traleika Glacier to the west and Brooks Glacier to the east. The mountain was named by Bradford Washburn in 1945 after Mount Tripyramid in New Hampshire.

== See also ==
- Mountain peaks of Alaska
