= Double Mountain =

Double Mountain may refer to one of three mountains in the United States:

- Double Mountain (Alaska), in Denali National Park
- Double Mountain (California), the highest point of the Tehachapi Mountains in California
- Double Mountains (Texas), the highest point in Stonewall County, Texas and notably isolated peak

Double Mountain may also refer to:

- Double Mountain Fork Brazos River, a tributary of the Brazos River, Texas
