= Ragged Peak (Denali National Park) =

Summit in Alaska, United States

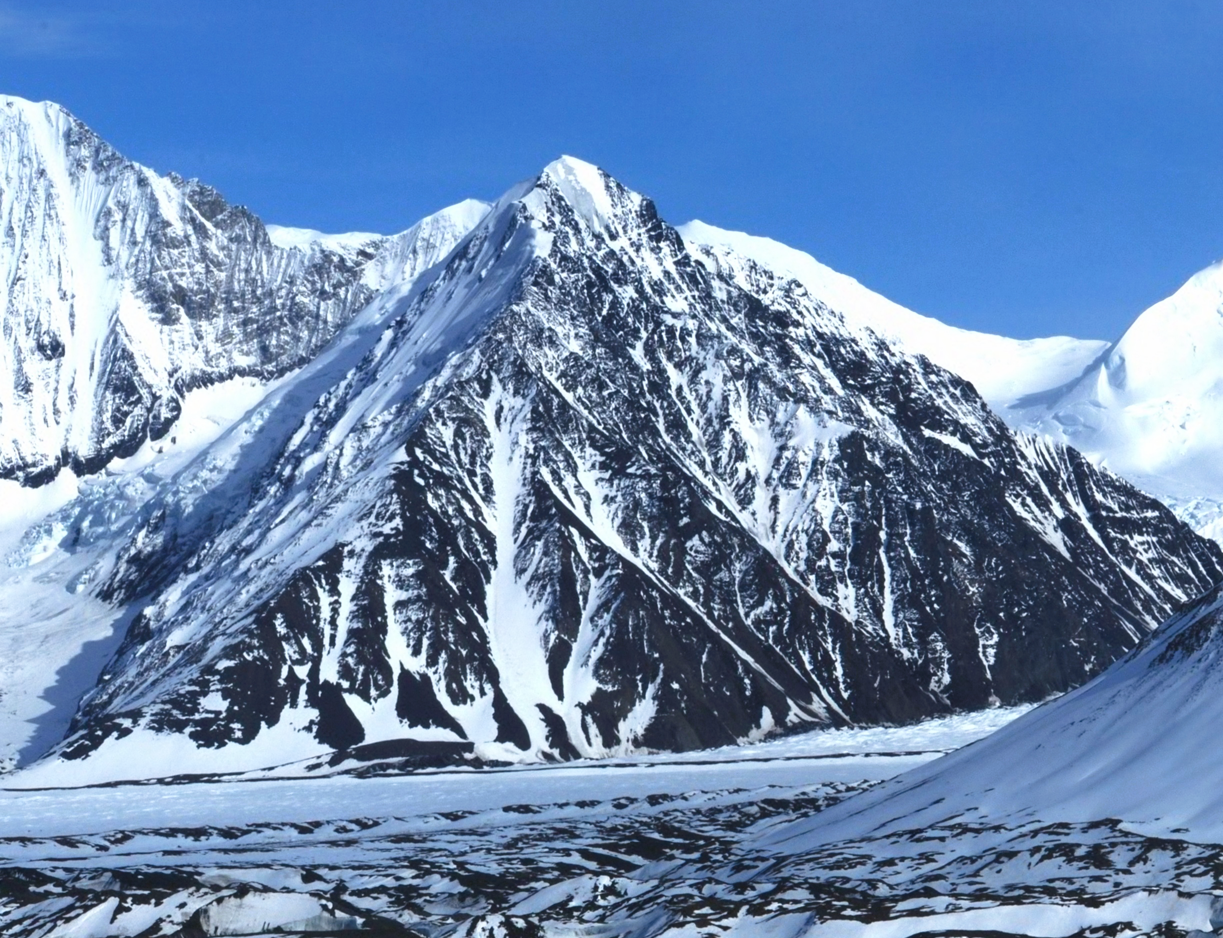
- Northwest aspect

Highest point
- Elevation: 9,160 ft (2,792 m)
- Prominence: 710 ft (216 m)
- Parent peak: Wedge Peak
- Isolation: 1.15 mi (1.85 km)
- Coordinates: 63°12′01″N 150°32′54″W

Geography
- Location within Alaska
- Interactive map of Ragged Peak
- Country: United States
- State: Alaska
- Borough: Denali
- Protected area: Denali National Park
- Parent range: Alaska Range
- Topo map: USGS Denali A-2

Ragged Peak is a 9,160-foot (2,792 m) summit in Alaska, United States.

== Description ==
Ragged Peak is located in the Alaska Range and in Denali National Park and Preserve. It is situated 17 miles (27 km) northeast of Denali, the highest summit in North America. Precipitation runoff from the mountain's slopes drains to the McKinley River. Topographic relief is significant as the summit rises 3,160 feet (960 meters) above the Brooks Glacier in 0.75 mile (1.2 km). The mountain's descriptive name was applied in 1948 by Bradford Washburn because the peak is composed of extremely rugged, jagged rock that has been highly fractured by frost action. The toponym was officially adopted in 1948 by the United States Board on Geographic Names.

== Climate ==
Based on the Köppen climate classification, Ragged Peak is located in a tundra climate zone with long, cold, snowy winters, and mild summers. Winter temperatures can drop below −20 °F with wind chill factors below −30 °F. This climate supports the Brooks and Muldrow Glaciers surrounding the peak. The months May through June offer the most favorable weather for climbing or viewing Ragged Peak.

== Gallery ==
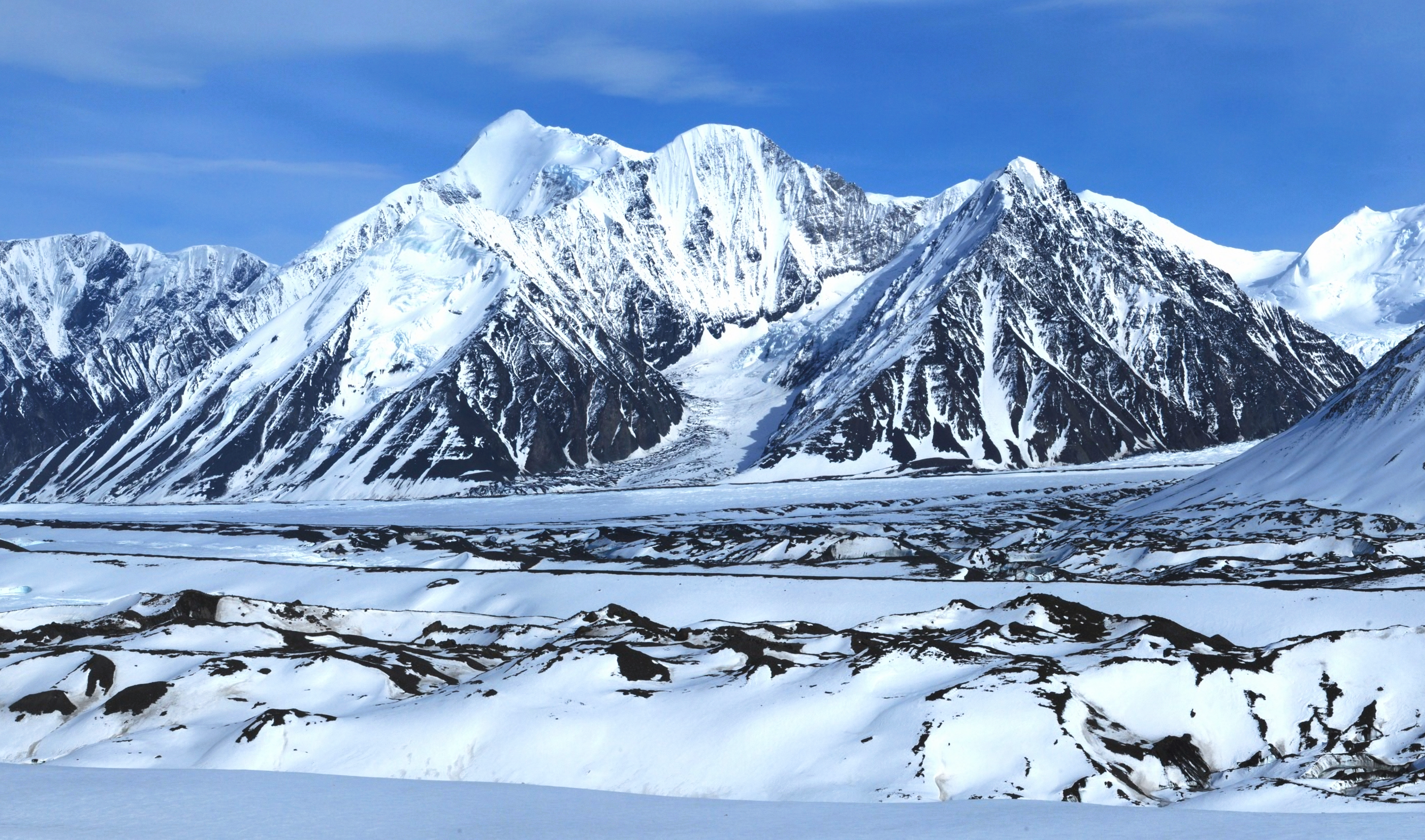
Ragged Peak to right, Wedge Peak centered, Mount Mather is highest to left

== See also ==
- List of mountains and mountain ranges of Denali National Park and Preserve
- Geology of Alaska
