= Wedge Peak (Alaska) =

Mountain in Alaska, United States

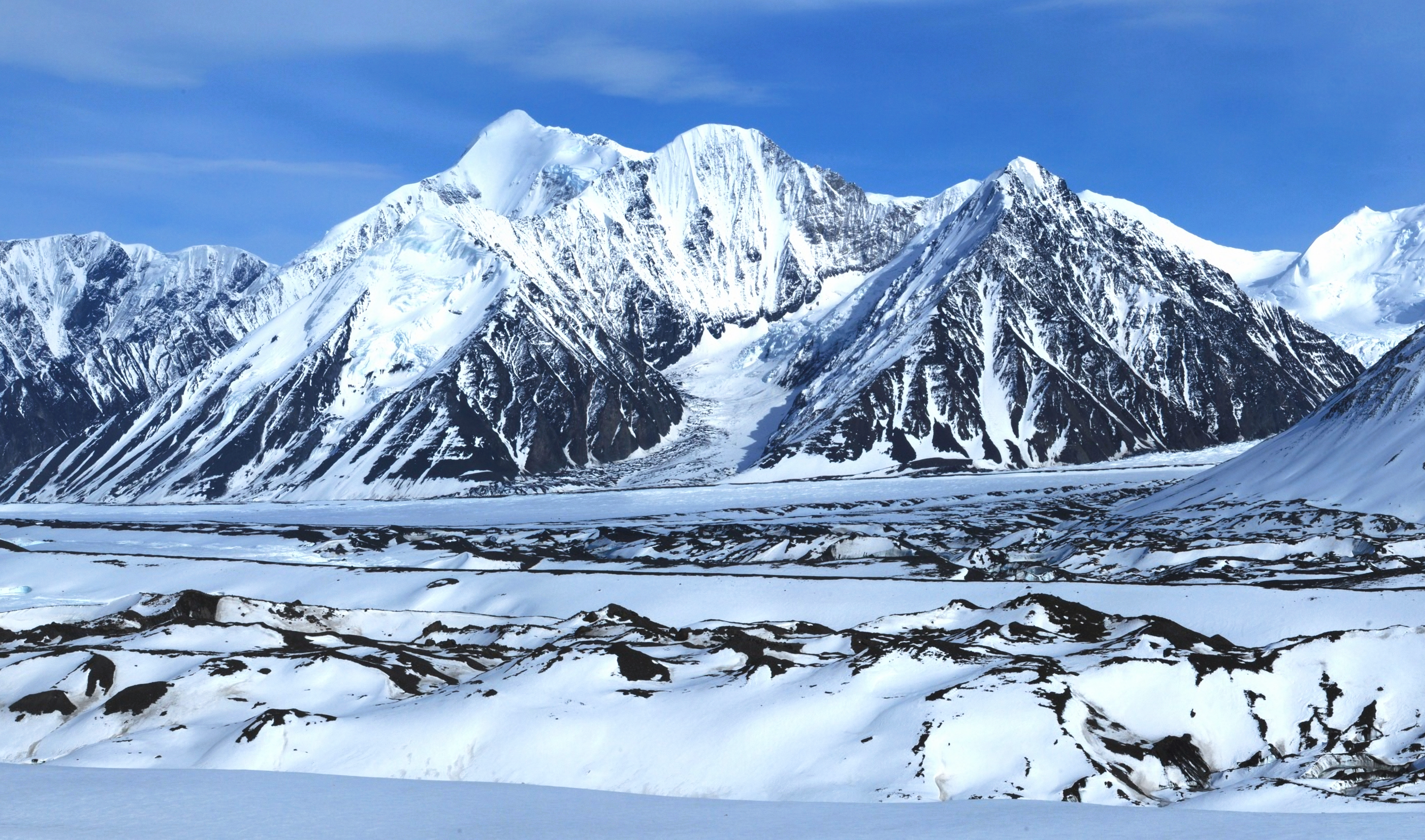
- Wedge Peak centered, northwest aspect (Mount Mather behind, Ragged Peak to right)

Highest point
- Elevation: 9,941 ft (3,030 m)
- Coordinates: 63°12′11″N 150°30′34″W

Geography
- Location within Alaska
- Location: Denali Borough, Alaska, United States
- Parent range: Alaska Range
- Topo map: USGS Mount McKinley A-2

Wedge Peak is a 9,941-foot (3,030 m) mountain in the Alaska Range, in Denali National Park and Preserve. Wedge Peak lies to the northeast of Denali overlooking Brooks Glacier and Muldrow Glacier. Mount Mather (Alaska) is immediately to the east. The peak was named in 1945 by the U.S. Army Air Force cold weather test expedition.

== See also ==
- Mountain peaks of Alaska
