= Mount Tripyramid =

Mount Tripyramid may refer to:

- Mount Tripyramid (Alaska)
- Mount Tripyramid (New Hampshire)
