= Mount Margaret =

Mount Margaret may refer to:

- Mount Margaret, Western Australia, abandoned town in the Goldfields-Esperance region
- Mount Margaret (Alaska), United States
- Mount Margaret (Kittitas County, Washington), United States
- Mount Margaret (Skamania County, Washington), United States

== See also ==
- Mount Margaret Aboriginal Community, Western Australia
- Electoral district of Mount Margaret, a former electoral district in Western Australia
- Mount Margaret Road District, former name of the Shire of Laverton, Western Australia
- Mount Margaret Station, pastoral lease in Queensland, Australia
