= Mount Sheldon =

Summit in Alaska, United States

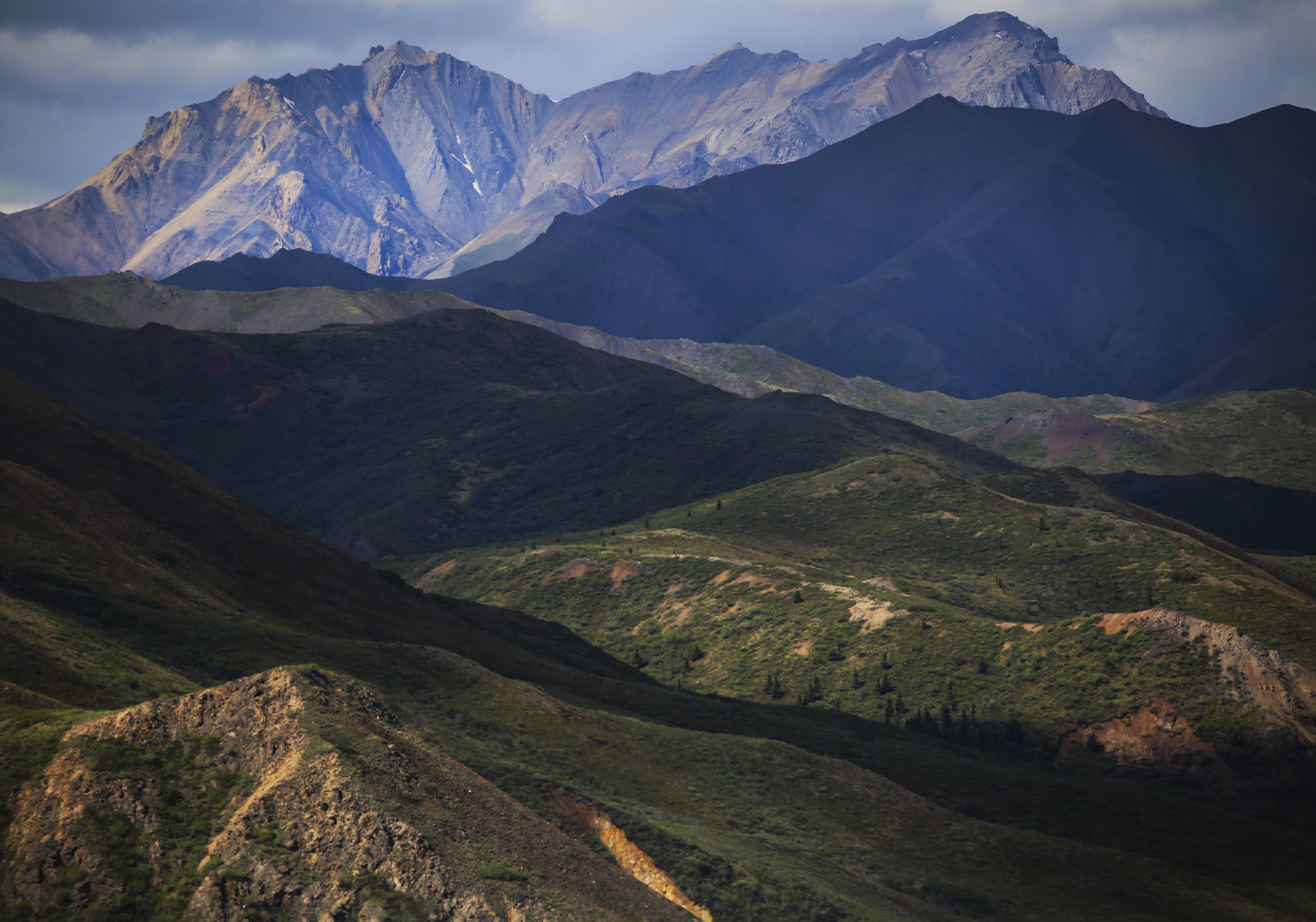
- East aspect, summit at upper right

Highest point
- Elevation: 5,686 ft (1,733 m)
- Prominence: 2,020 ft (616 m)
- Isolation: 4.68 mi (7.53 km)
- Coordinates: 63°35′27″N 150°07′02″W

Naming
- Etymology: Charles Alexander Sheldon

Geography
- Location within Alaska
- Interactive map of Mount Sheldon
- Country: United States
- State: Alaska
- Borough: Denali
- Protected area: Denali National Park
- Parent range: Alaska Range
- Topo map: USGS Denali C-1

Mount Sheldon is a 5,686 ft (1,730 m) summit in Alaska, United States.

== Description ==
Mount Sheldon is located in the Alaska Range and in Denali National Park and Preserve. It is situated 6.19 miles (9.96 km) northwest of Polychrome Mountain. Precipitation runoff from the mountain drains into tributaries of the Toklat River. Topographic relief is significant as the summit rises nearly 3,100 feet (940 meters) above the river in 1.7 mile (2.7 km).

== Climate ==
Based on the Köppen climate classification, Mount Sheldon is located in a tundra climate zone with long, cold, snowy winters, and mild summers. Winter temperatures can drop below −20 °F with wind chill factors below −30 °F. The months May through June offer the most favorable weather for climbing or viewing.

== Etymology ==
The mountain's name was shown on a 1916 U.S. Geological Survey document and the toponym has been officially adopted by the United States Board on Geographic Names. The name honors Charles Alexander Sheldon (1867–1928), naturalist and author of The Wilderness of Denali, who studied Dall sheep and other wildlife in the Mount McKinley (Denali) area in 1906–1908. He was the instrumental figure in Mount McKinley's establishment as a National Park.

== Gallery ==
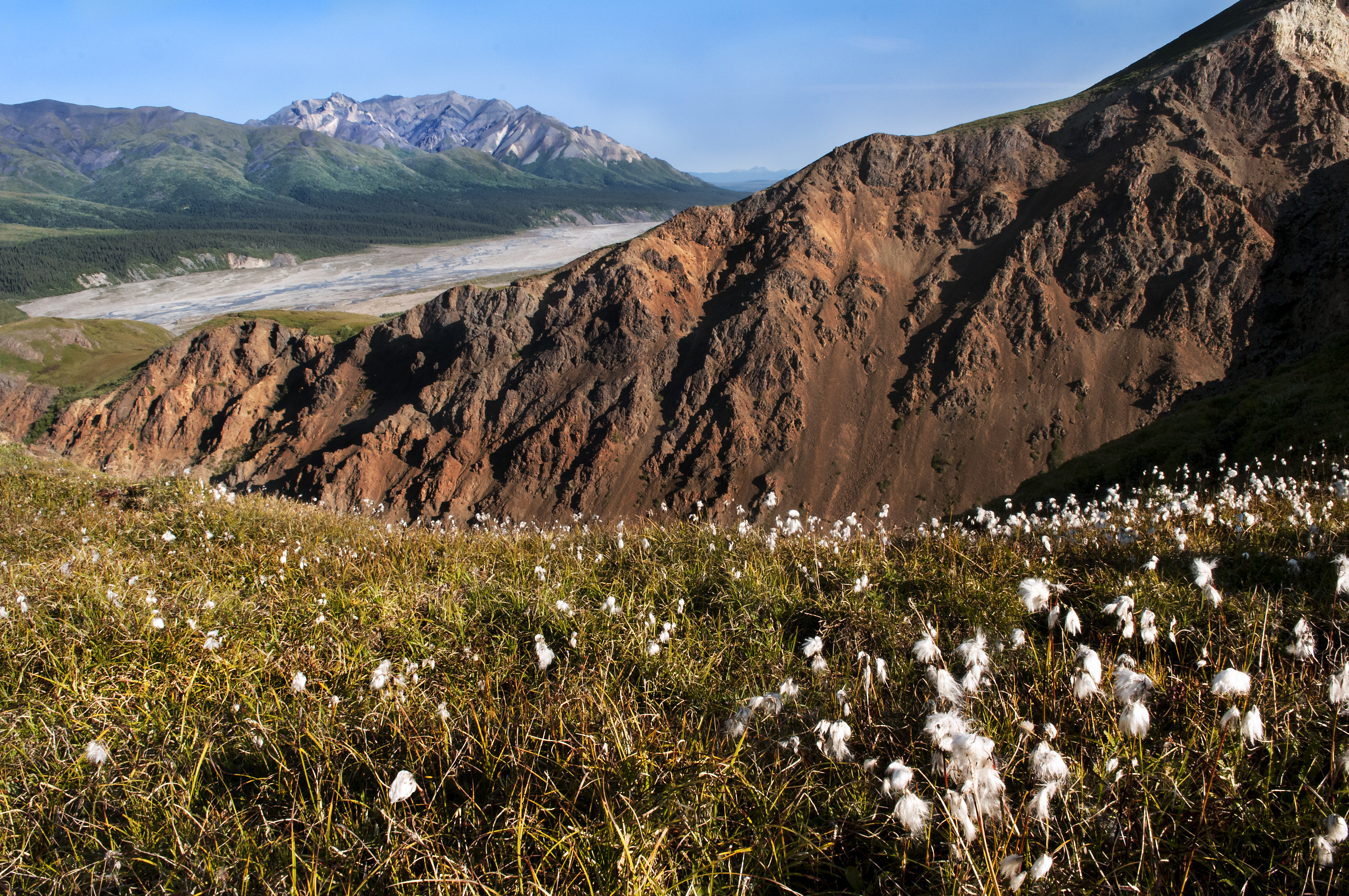
South aspect of Mt. Sheldon on the skyline

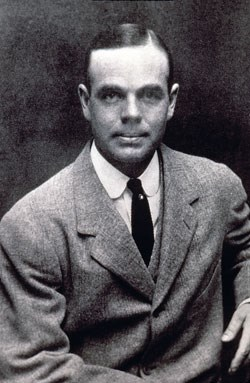
Charles Sheldon

== See also ==
- List of mountains and mountain ranges of Denali National Park and Preserve
- Geology of Alaska
