= Mount Deception =

Mount Deception may refer to:

- Mount Deception (Alaska), a peak of the Alaska Range southeast of Mount McKinley (Denali)
- Mount Deception (Washington) in the Olympic Mountains
- Mount Deception (New Hampshire), a mountain in the Dartmouth Range
