= Polychrome Glaciers =

Glaciers in Alaska, United States

- Location within Alaska
- Interactive map of Polychrome Glaciers
- Type: Valley glaciers
- Location: Denali Borough, Alaska, U.S.
- Coordinates: 63°27′20″N 149°50′41″W

The Polychrome Glaciers are five glaciers in the Alaska Range of Denali National Park and Preserve in the U.S. state of Alaska. The glaciers originate in parallel glaciated north-trending valleys in the Alaska Range, opposite Polychrome Mountain across Polychrome Pass.

== See also ==
- List of glaciers
