= Mount Eielson =

Summit in Denali National Park

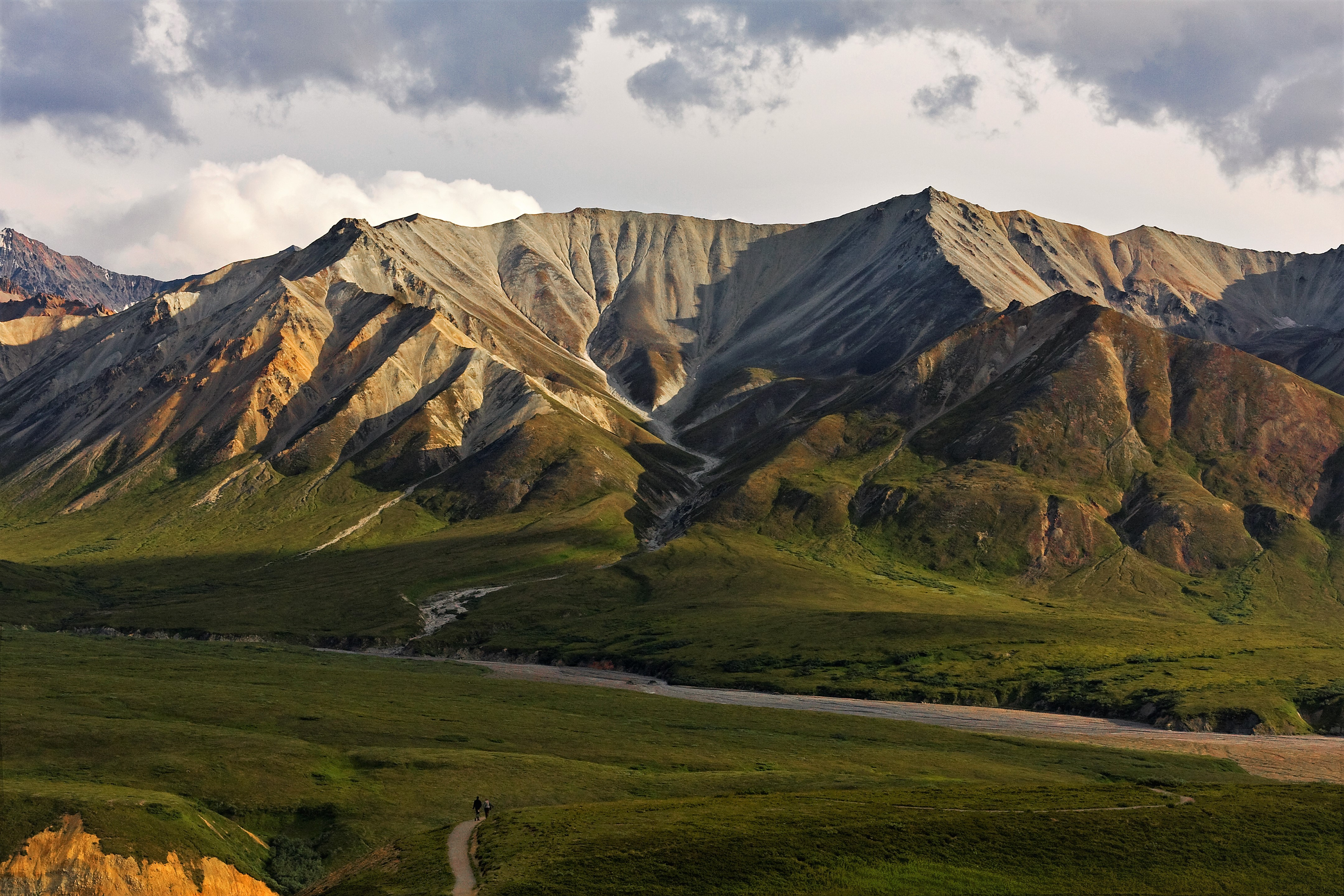
- Mount Eielson

Highest point
- Elevation: 5,802 ft (1,768 m)
- Prominence: 1,054 ft (321 m)
- Parent peak: Red Mountain (7,165 ft)
- Isolation: 2.82 mi (4.54 km)
- Coordinates: 63°22′54″N 150°19′21″W

Geography
- Location within Alaska
- Interactive map of Mount Eielson
- Location: Denali Borough; Alaska, United States
- Parent range: Alaska Range
- Topo map: USGS Denali B-1

Mount Eielson is a 5,802 ft (1,770 m) summit located in the Alaska Range, in Denali National Park and Preserve, in Alaska, United States. It is situated immediately east of the Muldrow Glacier terminus, 3.5 mi (6 km) south of Eielson Visitor Center, and 3.9 mi (6 km) north of Red Mountain, its nearest higher neighbor. Originally called Copper Mountain, this mountain was renamed by the U.S. Congress on June 14, 1930, to honor Carl Ben Eielson (1897–1929), for the pioneering work in aviation he performed in Alaska. Ben Eielson made the first airplane landing near Copper Mountain in Mount McKinley National Park, as it was known at that time.

== Climate ==
Based on the Köppen climate classification, Mount Eielson is located in a subarctic climate zone with long, cold, snowy winters, and mild summers. Temperatures can drop below −20 °C with wind chill factors below −30 °C. The months May through June offer the most favorable weather for climbing or viewing. Precipitation runoff from the mountain drains north into tributaries of the McKinley River, which in turn is part of in the Tanana River drainage basin.

== Gallery ==
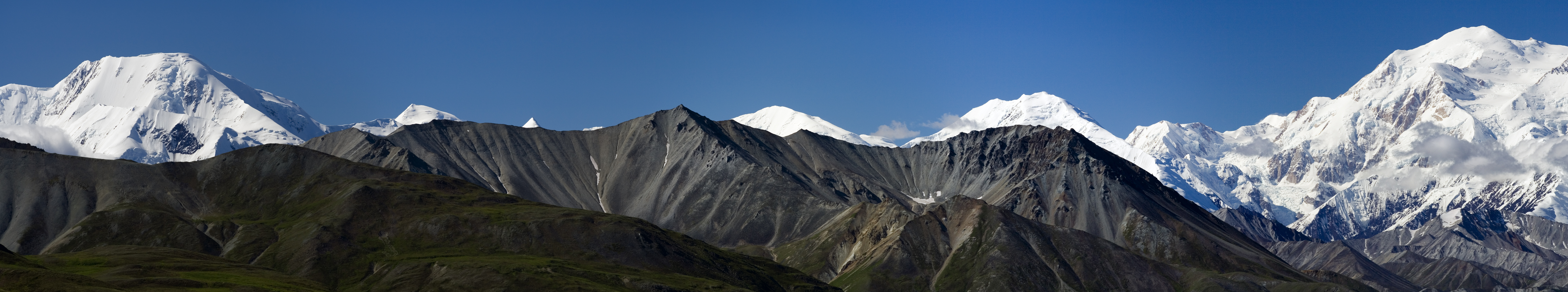
Mount Mather to left, Mount Eielson in center, Denali to the right

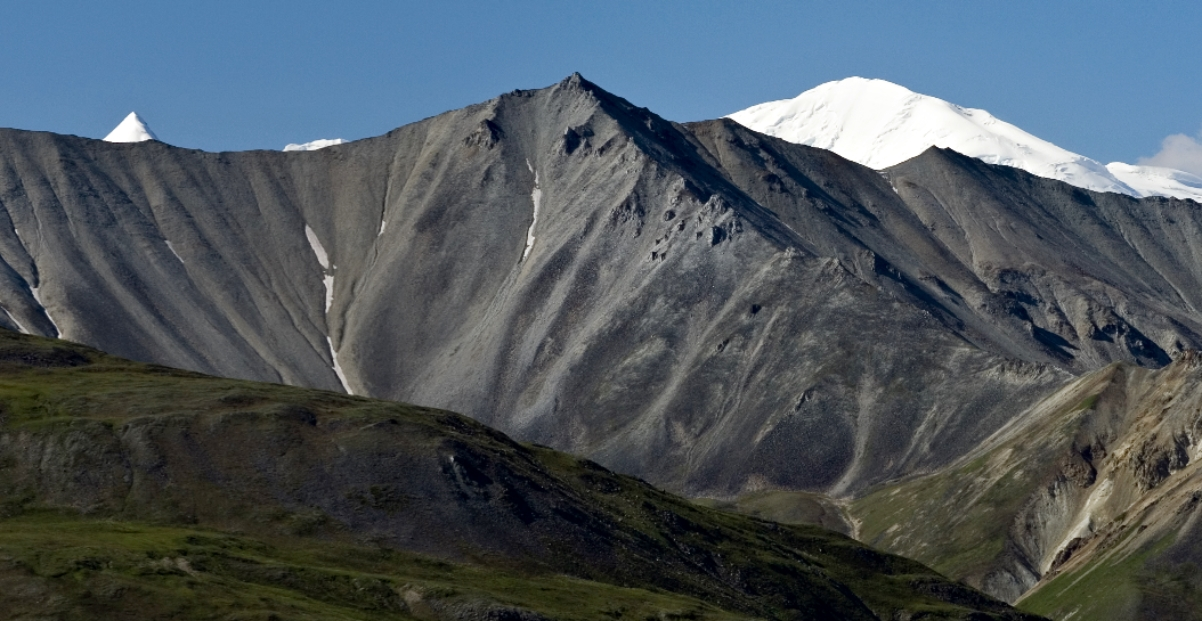
Mount Eielson summit detail

== See also ==
- List of mountain peaks of Alaska
- Geology of Alaska
