= Divide Mountain (Alaska) =

Mountain in Alaska, United States

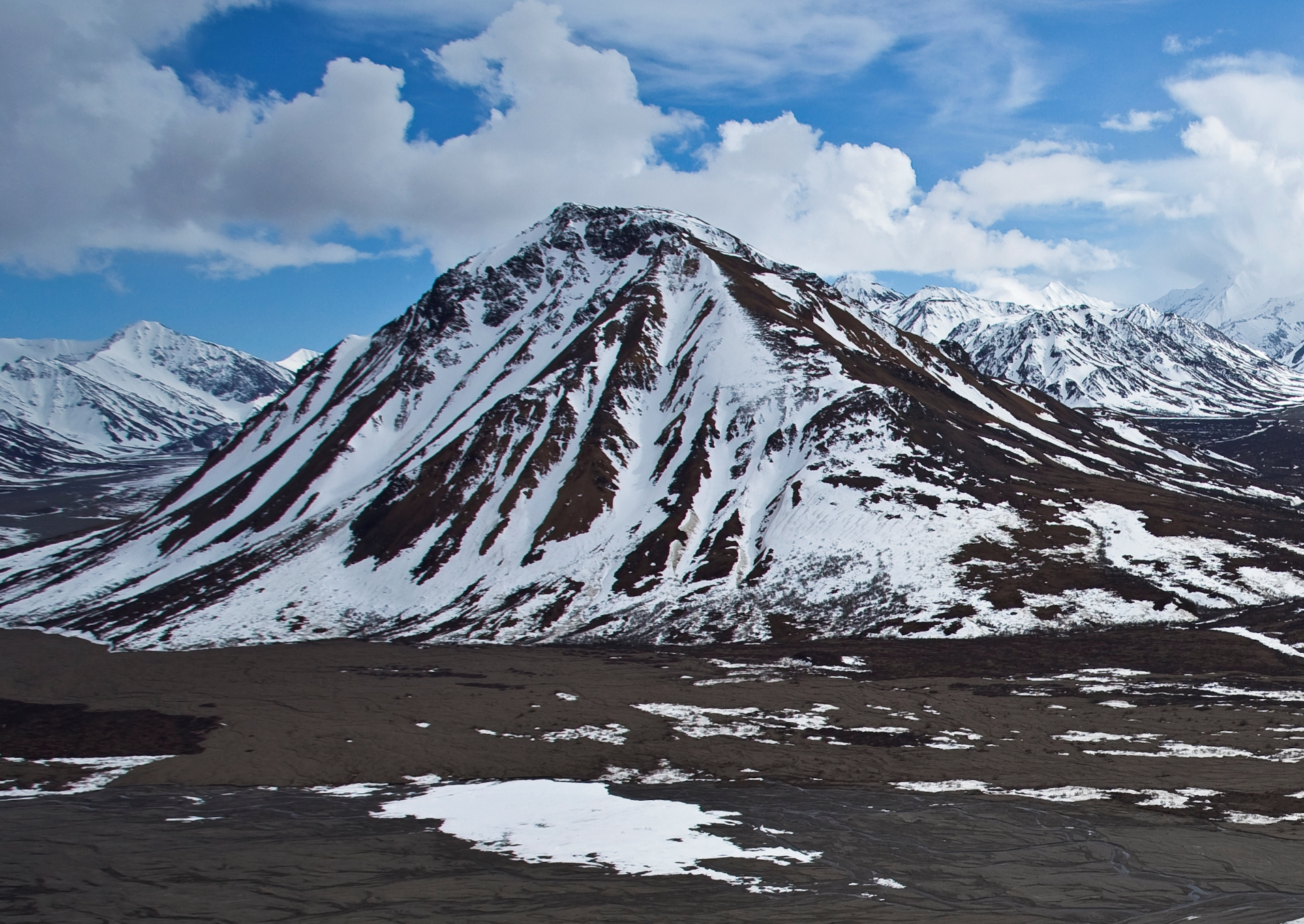
- Divide Mountain, north aspect

Highest point
- Elevation: 5,195 ft (1,583 m)
- Prominence: 938 ft (286 m)
- Isolation: 2.41 mi (3.88 km)
- Coordinates: 63°29′38″N 150°00′09″W

Geography
- Location within Alaska
- Interactive map of Divide Mountain
- Location: Denali Borough; Alaska, United States
- Parent range: Alaska Range
- Topo map: USGS Denali B-1

Divide Mountain is a 5,195 ft (1,580 m) summit located in Denali National Park and Preserve, in the Alaska Range, in the U.S. state of Alaska. It is a landmark in the Toklat River valley visible to tourists from the park road. Divide Mountain is situated 2 mi (3 km) southwest of Polychrome Pass, 3.44 mi (6 km) southwest of Polychrome Mountain, and 11 mi (18 km) north-northeast of Scott Peak. Although modest in elevation, relief is significant since the peak rises over 2,000 ft (610 m) from the surrounding valley floor. This mountain's local descriptive name was first shown on a 1916 U.S. Geological Survey map.

== Climate ==
Based on the Köppen climate classification, Divide Mountain is located in a subarctic climate zone with long, cold, snowy winters, and mild summers. Temperatures can drop below −20 °C with wind chill factors below −30 °C. Precipitation runoff from the mountain drains into the Toklat River, which in turn is part of the Tanana River drainage basin. The months May through June offer the most favorable weather for climbing or viewing.

== Gallery ==
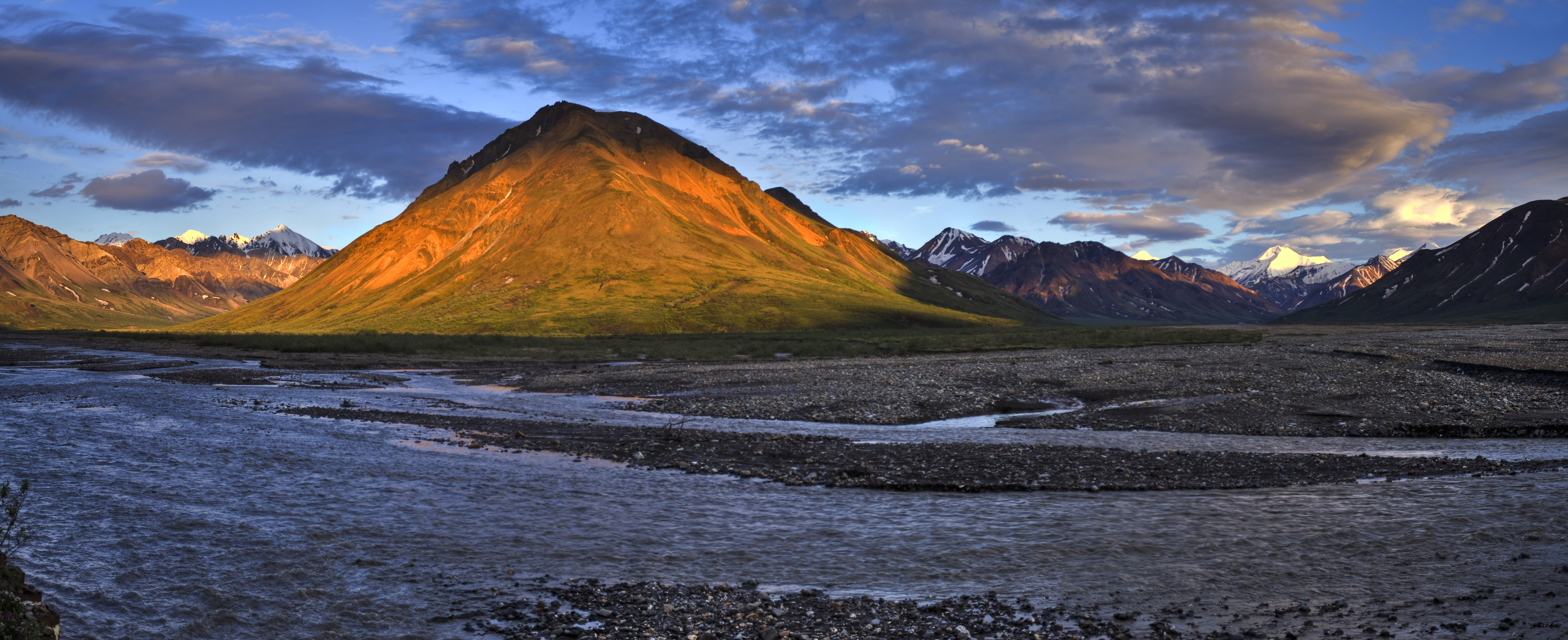

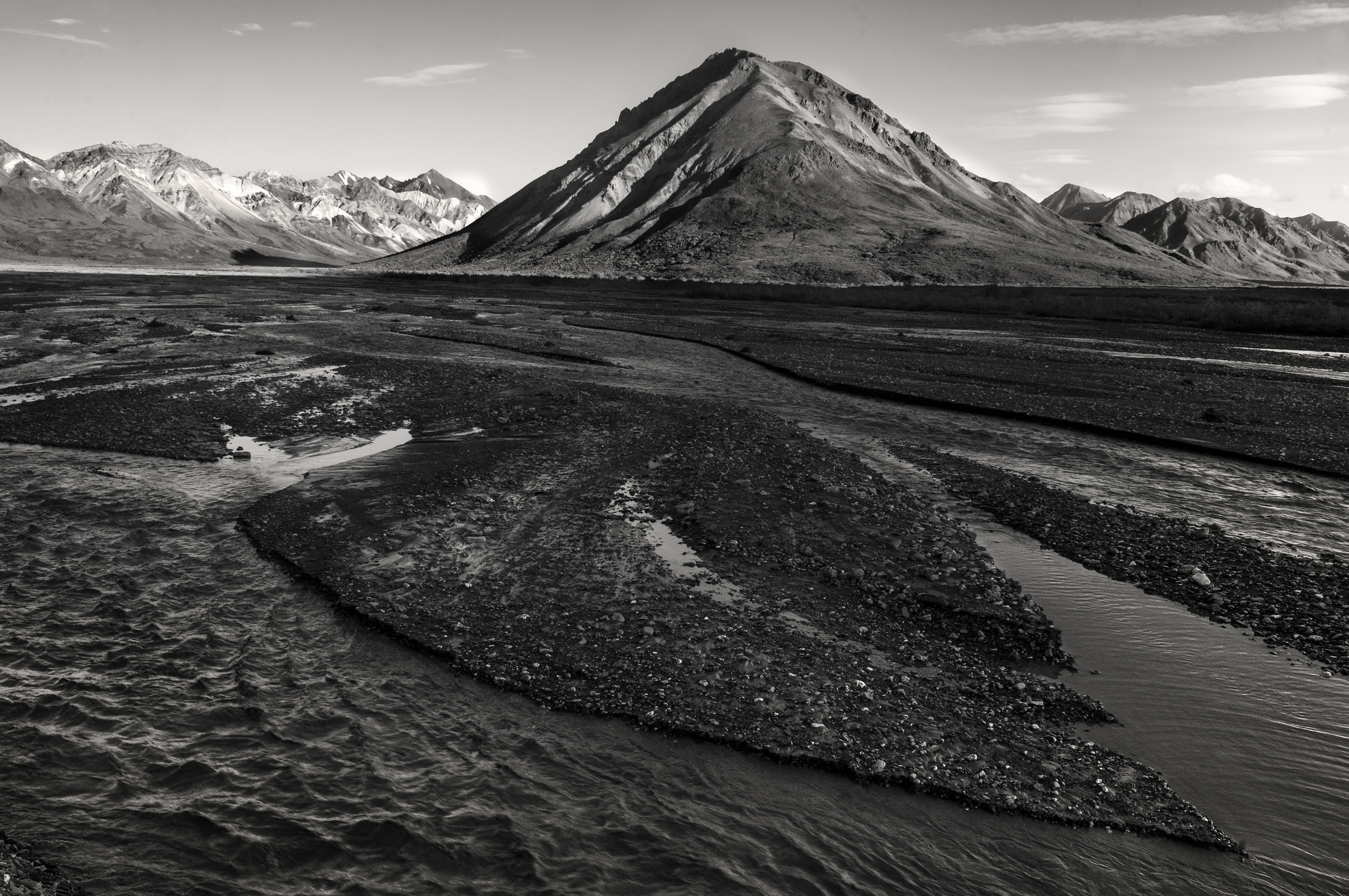

== See also ==
- List of mountain peaks of Alaska
- Geology of Alaska
