= Sable Mountain =

Summit in Alaska, United States

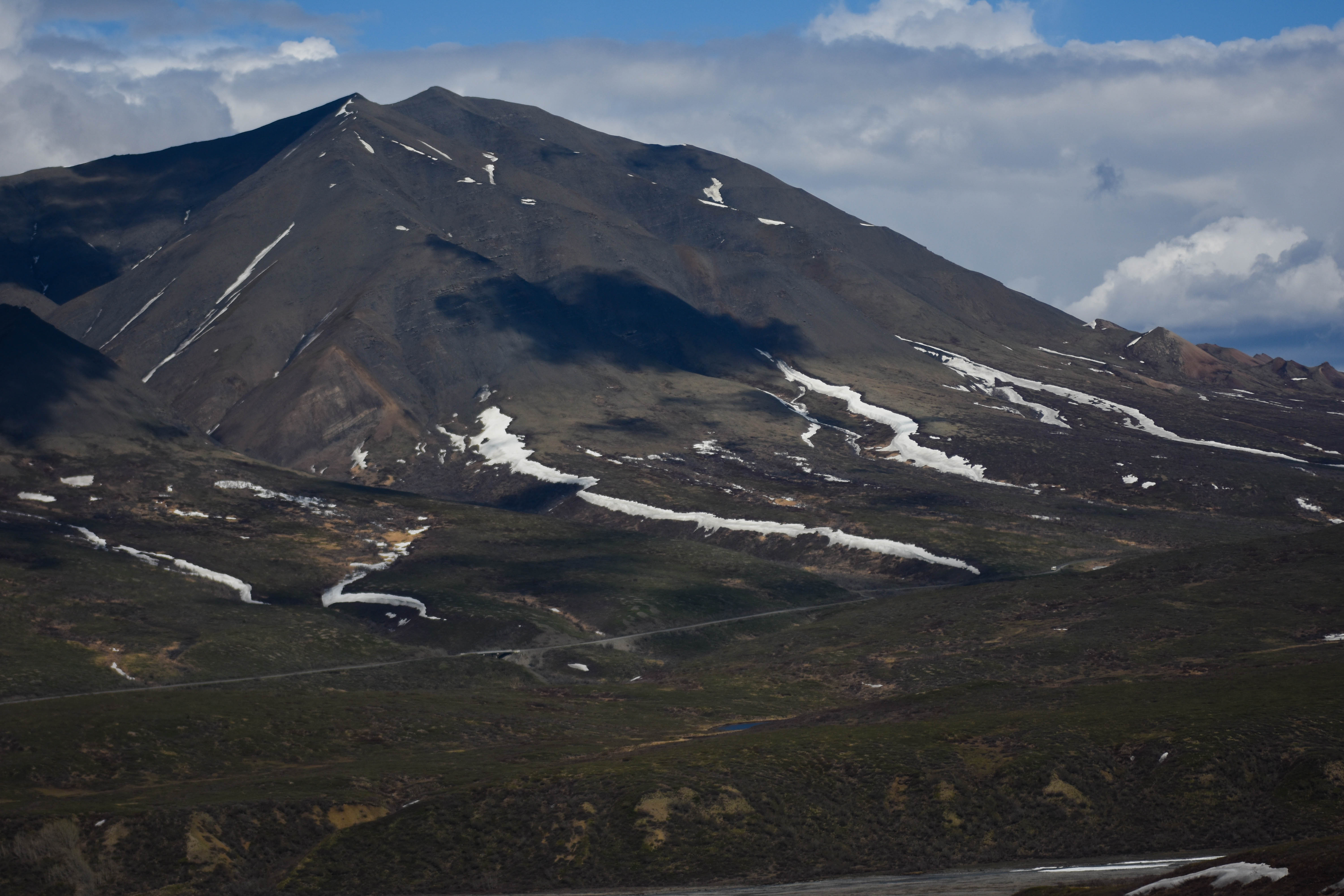
- Southwest aspect

Highest point
- Elevation: 5,994 ft (1,827 m)
- Prominence: 2,200 ft (671 m)
- Parent peak: Peak 6756
- Isolation: 6.39 mi (10.28 km)
- Coordinates: 63°34′20″N 149°42′29″W

Geography
- Location within Alaska
- Interactive map of Sable Mountain
- Country: United States
- State: Alaska
- Borough: Denali
- Protected area: Denali National Park
- Parent range: Alaska Range
- Topo map: USGS Healy C-6

Climbing
- Easiest route: Sable Mountain Trail

Sable Mountain is a 5,994 ft (1,830 m) summit in Alaska, United States.

== Description ==
Sable Mountain is located in the Alaska Range and in Denali National Park and Preserve. It is situated 3.43 miles (5.52 km) southwest of Igloo Mountain at Sable Pass near mile 40 of the Park Road which traverses the mountain's southern slope. Precipitation runoff from the mountain drains west to the Toklat River and east to the Teklanika River. Topographic relief is significant as the summit rises 2,000 feet (610 meters) above Tattler Creek in one mile (1.6 km). The mountain's name was shown on a 1916 U.S. Geological Survey document and the toponym has been officially adopted by the United States Board on Geographic Names.

== Climate ==
Based on the Köppen climate classification, Sable Mountain is located in a tundra climate zone with long, cold, snowy winters, and mild summers. Winter temperatures can drop below −20 °F with wind chill factors below −30 °F. The months May through June offer the most favorable weather for climbing or viewing.

== Gallery ==
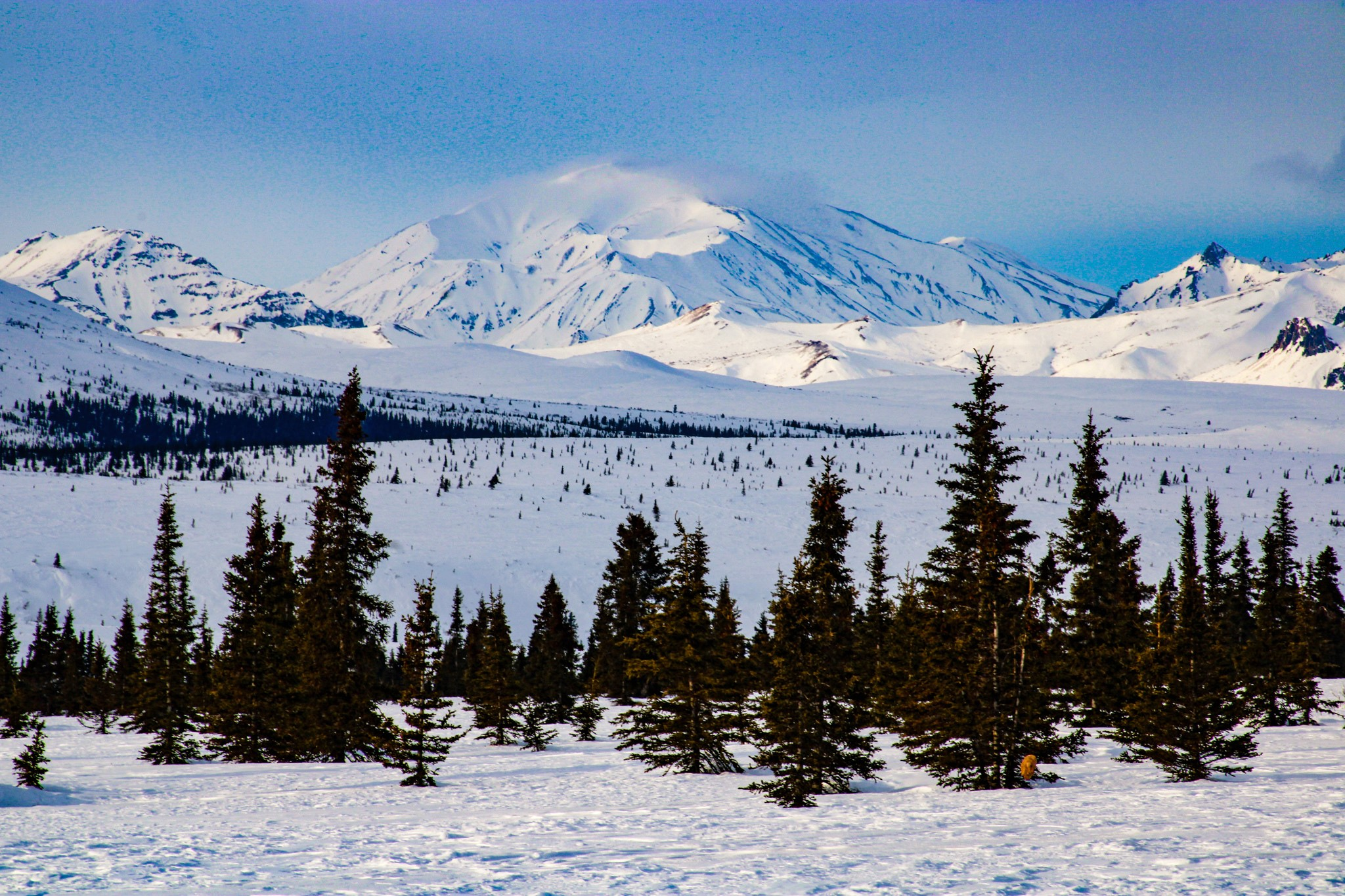
West aspect of Sable in the distance

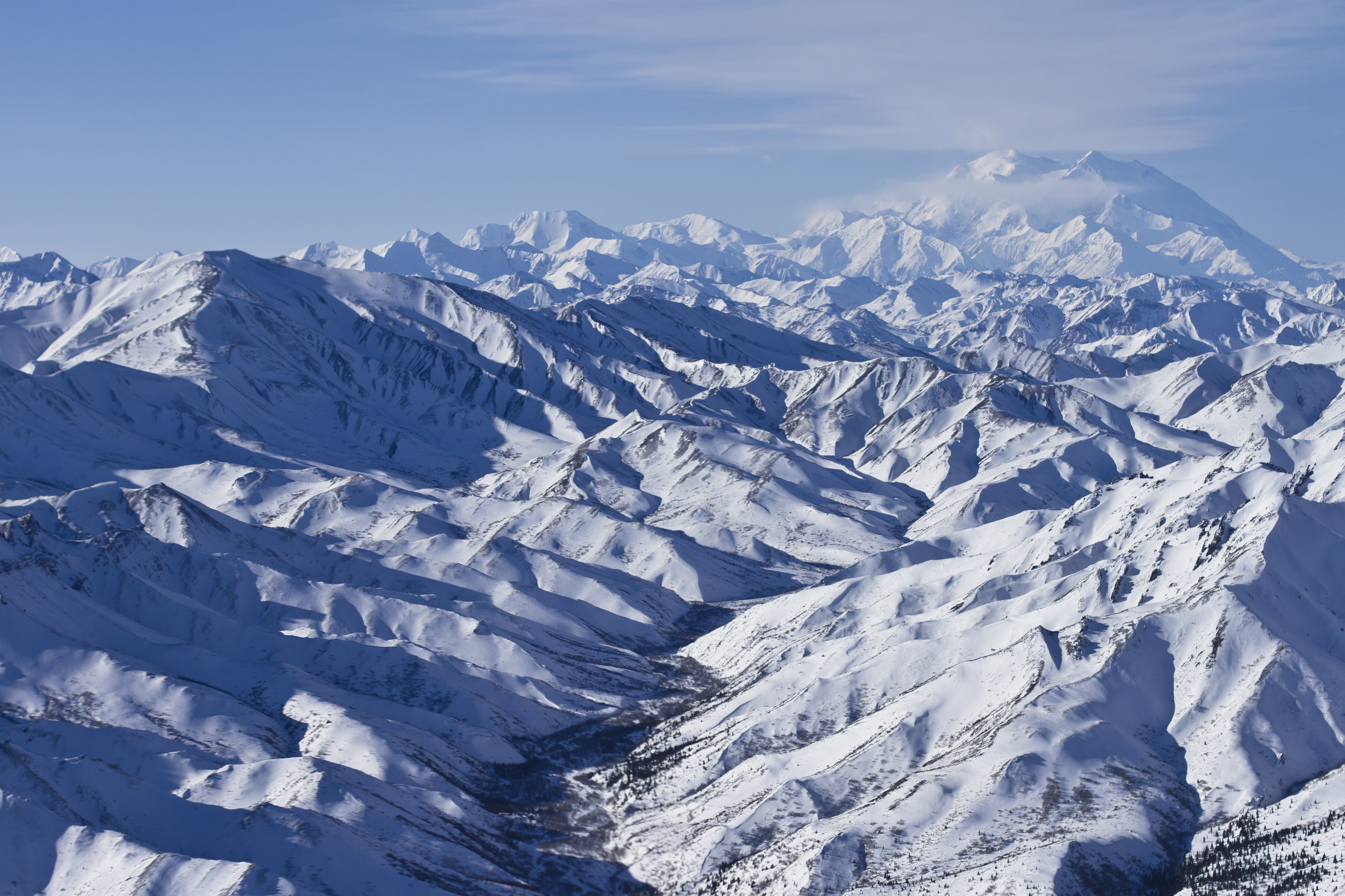
East aspect of Sable Mountain (left) and upper Big Creek with Denali in upper right.

== See also ==
- List of mountains and mountain ranges of Denali National Park and Preserve
- Geology of Alaska
