= Charles Alexander Sheldon =

American conservationist

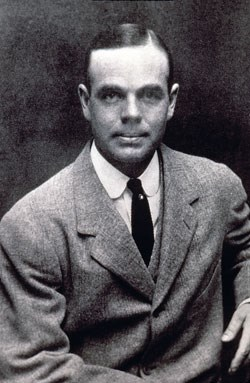

Charles Alexander Sheldon (17 October 1867 in Rutland, Vermont – 21 September 1928) was an American conservationist and the "Father of Denali National Park". He had a special interest in the bighorn sheep and spent time hunting with the Seri Indians in Sonora, Mexico, who knew him as Maricaana Caamla ("American hunter"). Another favorite haunt was the lakes and rivers which later became Kejimkujik National Park in Nova Scotia where Sheldon built a cabin at Beaverskin Lake.

In December 1905, Sheldon was elected member of the Boone and Crockett Club, a wildlife conservation organization founded by Theodore Roosevelt and George Bird Grinnell in 1887. He died on September 21, 1928, in Nova Scotia while on his annual stay at his cabin where he spent much of his final years. The Sheldon National Wildlife Refuge in northwestern Nevada is named in Sheldon's honor, as is Mount Sheldon in Denali National Park.

== Bibliography ==
- The Wilderness of the North Pacific Coast Islands
- The Wilderness of the Upper Yukon
- The Wilderness of Denali
