= Mount Brooks =

Mountain in Alaska, United States

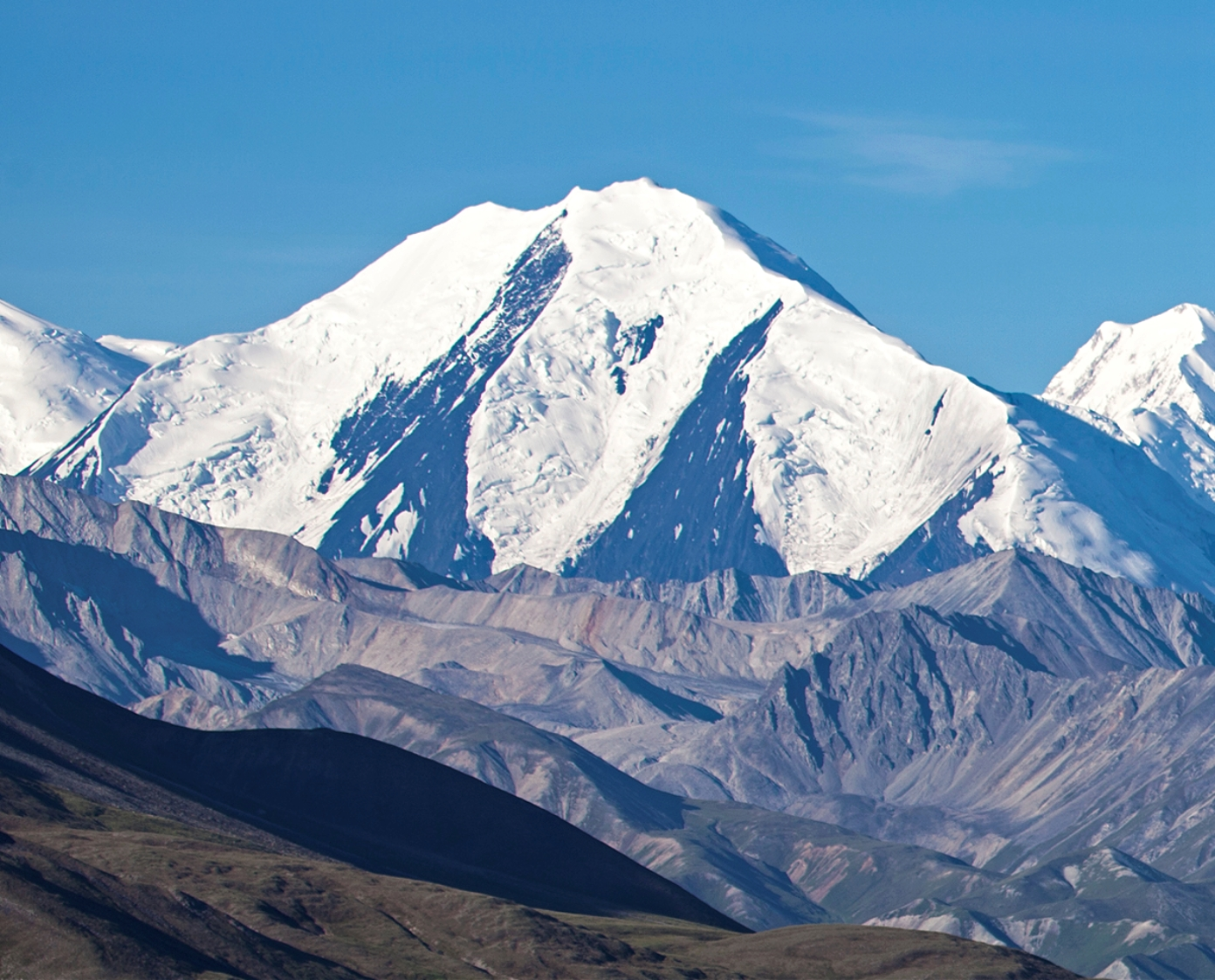

Highest point
- Elevation: 11,890 ft (3,624 m)
- Prominence: 1,790 ft (546 m)
- Parent peak: Denali
- Coordinates: 63°11′16″N 150°38′50″W

Geography
- Location within Alaska
- Interactive map of Mount Brooks
- Country: United States
- State: Alaska
- Borough: Denali
- Protected area: Denali National Park
- Parent range: Alaska Range
- Topo map: USGS Denali A-2

Climbing
- First ascent: 1952

Mount Brooks is a mountain peak in the central Alaska Range in Denali National Park and Preserve. The 11,890-foot (3,620 m) mountain is part of a ridge extending northeastward from the main Denali massif, which includes Pyramid Peak and Mount Silverthrone. The ridge lies between Brooks Glacier and Traleika Glacier, overlooking Muldrow Glacier to the north. The summit is partly covered by ice.

== Climate ==
Based on the Köppen climate classification, Mount Brooks is located in a tundra climate zone with long, cold, snowy winters, and mild summers. Winter temperatures can drop below −20 °F with wind chill factors below −30 °F. This climate supports the Brooks Traleika, and Muldrow Glaciers surrounding the peak. The months May through June offer the most favorable weather for climbing or viewing Mount Brooks.

== History ==
The mountain was named by Belmore Browne in 1912 to honor Alfred Hulse Brooks (1871–1924), an American geologist who served as chief geologist for Alaska for the United States Geological Survey from 1903 to 1924. The mountain's toponym was officially adopted in 1947 by the United States Board on Geographic Names.

The first ascent of the summit was made on July 5, 1952, by Thayer Scudder, Winslow Briggs, J. S. Humphreys, and David Bernays.

== Gallery ==
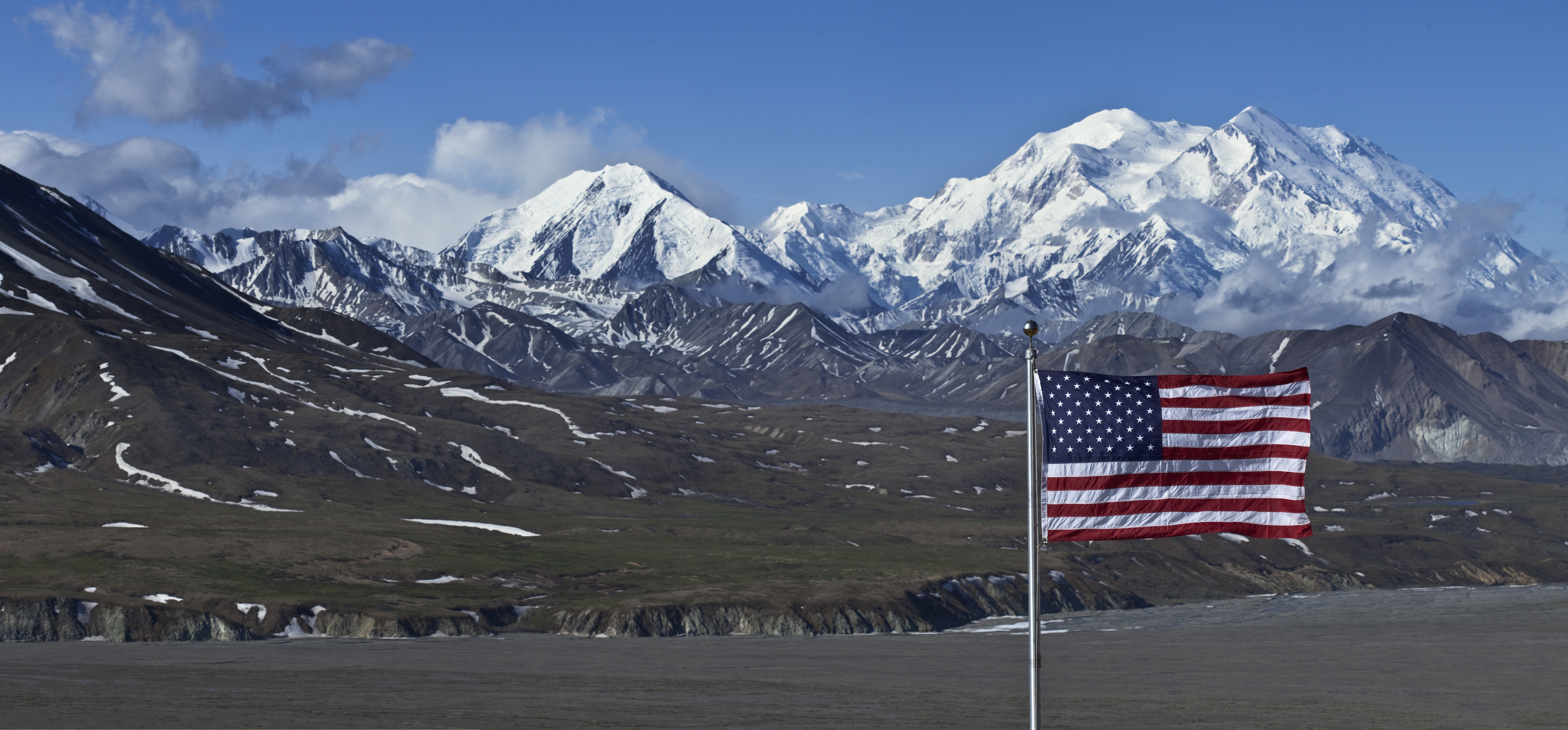
Eielson Visitor Center view with Brooks left of center

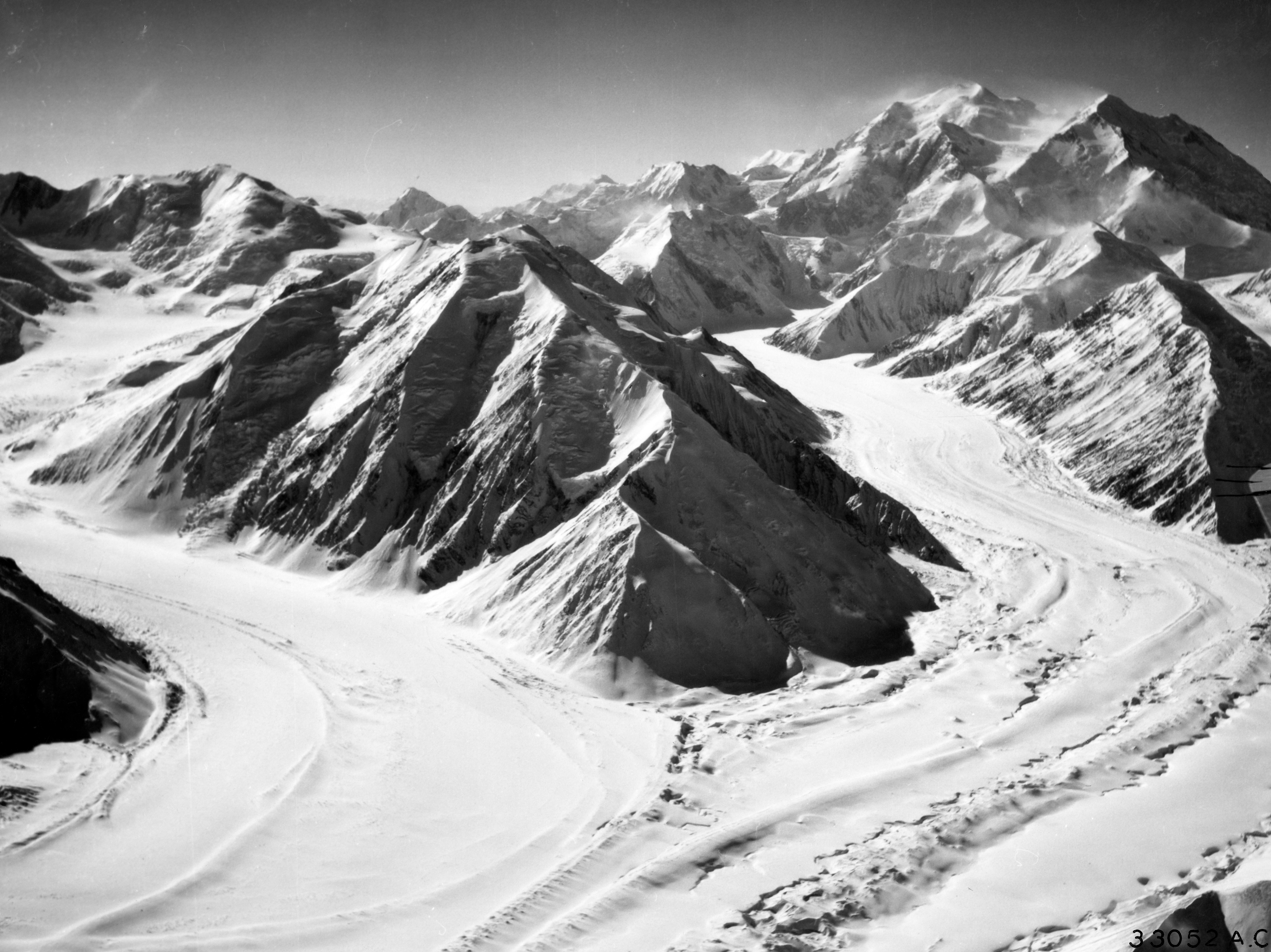
Mt. Brooks left of center, Denali upper right

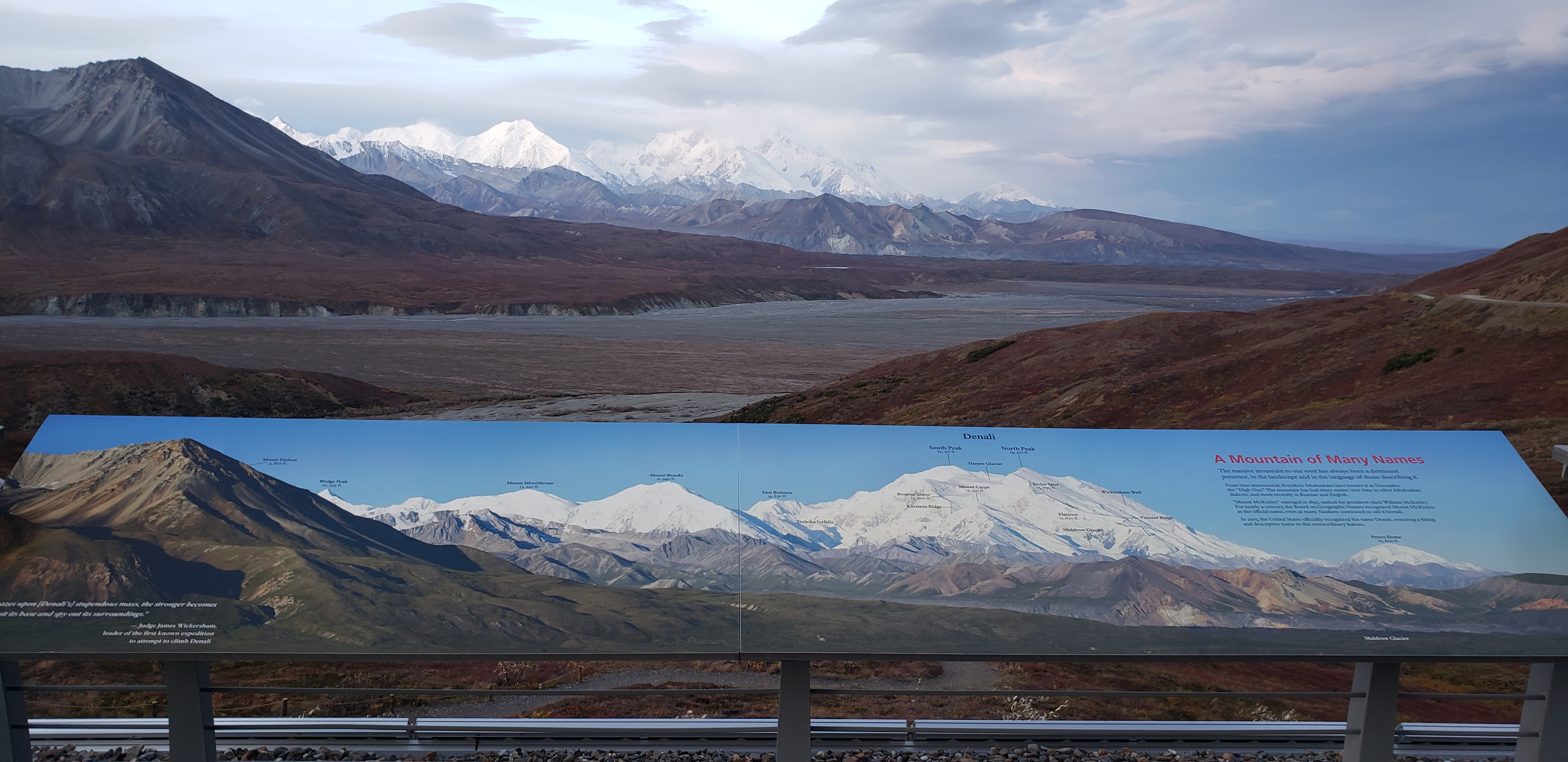

== See also ==
- Mountain peaks of Alaska
- List of mountains and mountain ranges of Denali National Park and Preserve
