= Mount Deception (Alaska) =

Mountain in Alaska, United States

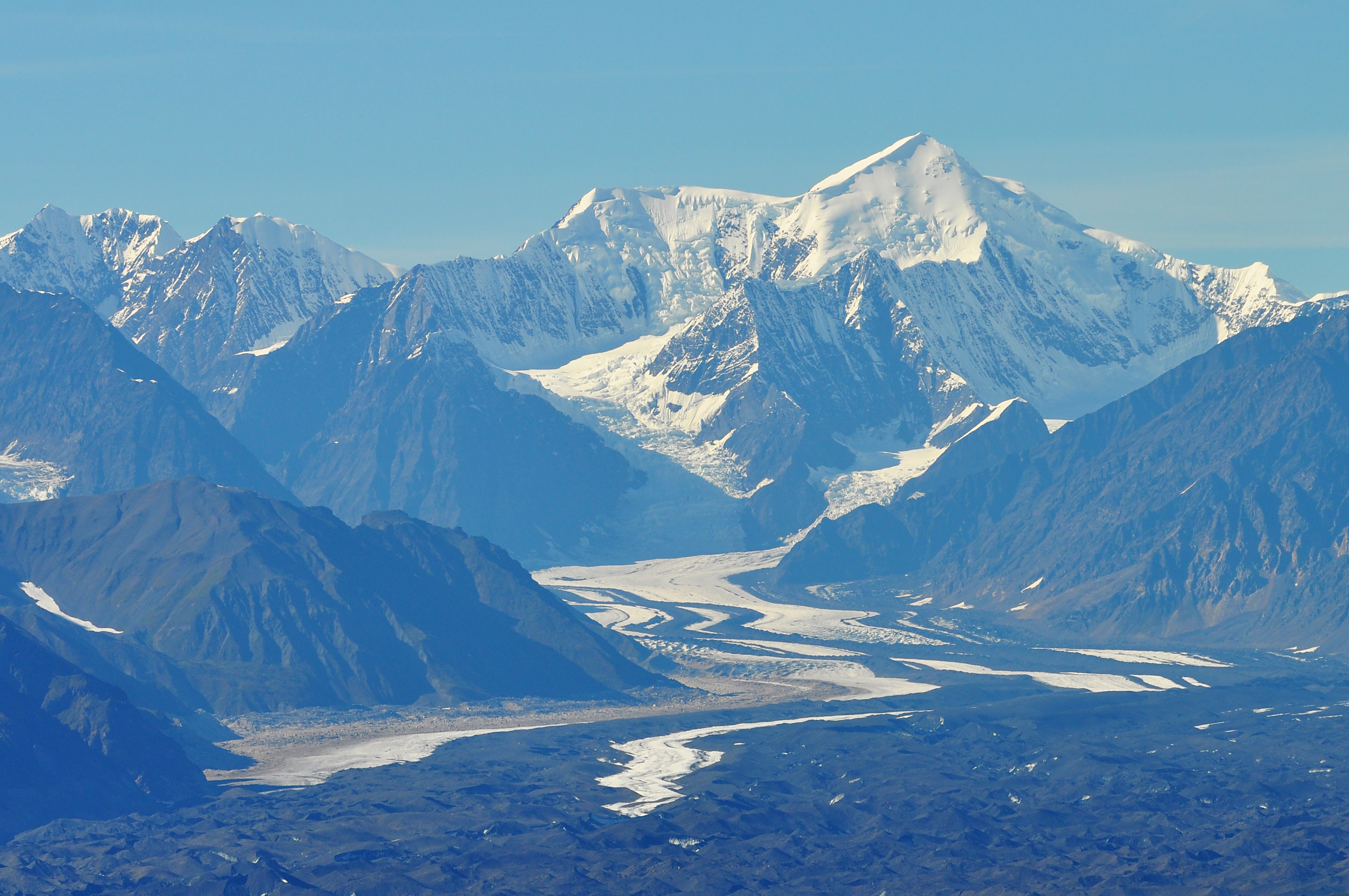

Highest point
- Elevation: 11,539 ft (3,517 m)
- Prominence: 2,126 ft (648 m)
- Listing: List of mountain peaks of Alaska
- Coordinates: 63°09′30″N 150°31′51″W

Geography
- Location within Alaska
- Interactive map of Mount Deception
- Location: Denali Borough, Alaska, United States
- Parent range: Alaska Range
- Topo map: USGS Mount McKinley A-2

Climbing
- First ascent: November 1944
- Easiest route: Northeast ridge

Mount Deception is a 11,539-foot (3,517 m) mountain in the Alaska Range, in Denali National Park and Preserve. Mount Deception lies 16 miles (26 km) east-southeast of Denali, overlooking Brooks Glacier. The glacier-covered mountain was named by a U.S. Army crash investigation party on November 13, 1944, who were the first to ascend the mountain while investigating an airplane crash that happened in September 1944.

== 1944 plane crash ==
On September 18, 1944, a US Army Air Forces Douglas C-47 Skytrain which took off from Elmendorf Air Force Base in Anchorage, Alaska, en route to Ladd Army Airfield in Fairbanks, Alaska. For reasons unknown the plane traveled off course crashing into the then unnamed peak killing all 16 passengers and all 3 crew members. A 44-man rescue expedition reached the crash site in early November but a recent ten-foot snowfall exasperated efforts to find any remains.
