= Mount Margaret (Alaska) =

Mountain summit in Alaska, United States

- Primrose Ridge
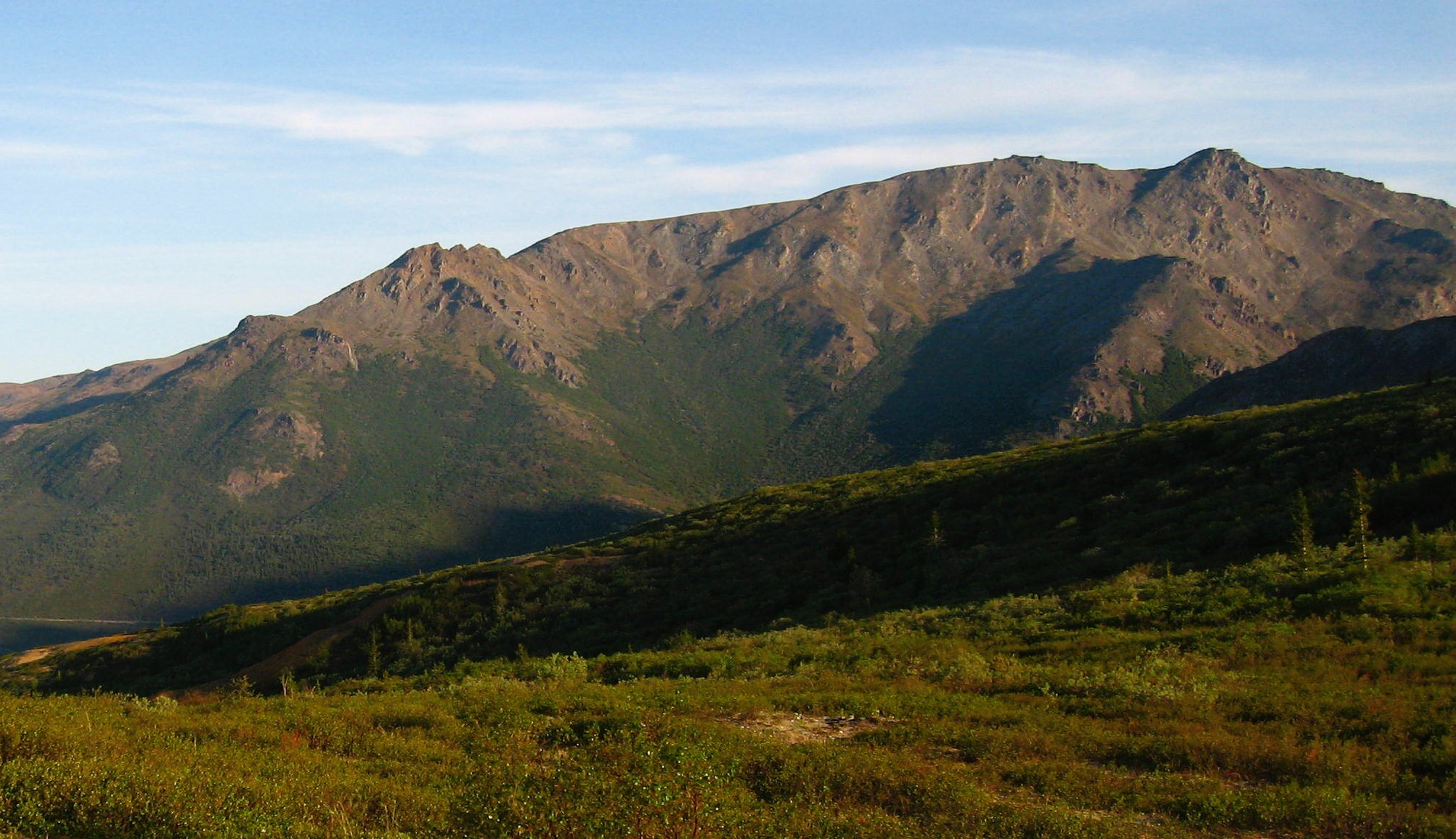
- East-southeast slope

Highest point
- Elevation: 5,059 ft (1,542 m)
- Prominence: 2,009 ft (612 m)
- Isolation: 3.56 mi (5.73 km)
- Coordinates: 63°45′08″N 149°21′40″W

Naming
- Etymology: Margaret Murie

Geography
- Location within Alaska
- Interactive map of Mount Margaret
- Country: United States
- State: Alaska
- Borough: Denali
- Protected area: Denali National Park
- Parent range: Alaska Range
- Topo map: USGS Healy D-5

Mount Margaret, also known as Primrose Ridge, is a 5,059-foot (1,542-metre) summit in Alaska, United States.

== Description ==
Mount Margaret is located in the Alaska Range and in Denali National Park and Preserve. It is situated 11 miles (18 km) west of Mount Healy at miles 14–20 of the Park Road which traverses the mountain's southern slope. Precipitation runoff from the mountain drains west into the Sanctuary River and east into Savage River, which are both tributaries of the Teklanika River. Topographic relief is modest as the summit rises 2,550 feet (780 meters) above the Savage River Canyon in two miles (3.2 km).

== Climate ==
Based on the Köppen climate classification, Mount Margaret is located in a tundra climate zone with long, cold, snowy winters, and mild summers. Winter temperatures can drop below −20 °F with wind chill factors below −30 °F. The months May through June offer the most favorable weather for climbing or viewing.

== Etymology ==
The mountain's toponym has been officially adopted by the United States Board on Geographic Names as reported, and perhaps given, by surveyor Woodbury Abbey on his 1921 survey of the boundaries of McKinley National Park. The name honors Margaret Murie (1902–2003), naturalist, writer, conservationist, and one of the most significant figures in Alaska history.

== See also ==
- List of mountains and mountain ranges of Denali National Park and Preserve
- Geology of Alaska
