= Double Mountain (Alaska) =

Mountain in Alaska, United States

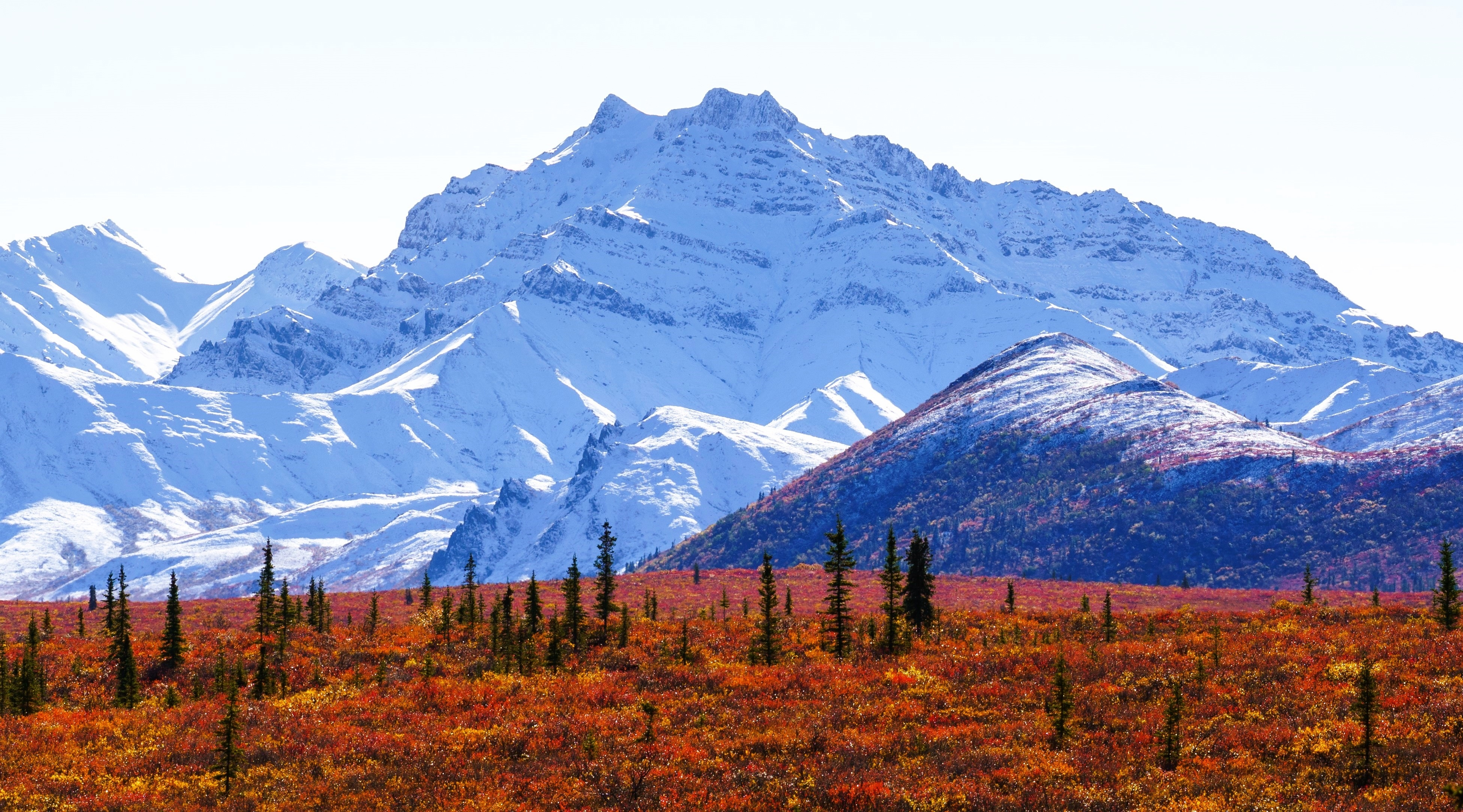
- North aspect

Highest point
- Elevation: 5,899 ft (1,798 m)
- Prominence: 1,049 ft (320 m)
- Parent peak: Peak 5950
- Isolation: 1.32 mi (2.12 km)
- Coordinates: 63°36′12″N 149°28′22″W

Geography
- Location within Alaska
- Interactive map of Double Mountain
- Country: United States
- State: Alaska
- Borough: Denali
- Protected area: Denali National Park
- Parent range: Alaska Range
- Topo map: USGS Healy C-5

Double Mountain is a 5,899 ft (1,800 m) summit in Alaska, United States.

== Description ==
Double Mountain is located in the Alaska Range in Denali National Park and Preserve. It is situated nine miles (14 km) northwest of Fang Mountain on the divide separating the Sanctuary and Teklanika rivers. Precipitation runoff from the mountain drains west into the Teklanika River and east into the Sanctuary River, which are both part of the Tanana River drainage basin. Topographic relief is significant as the summit rises 3,050 feet (930 meters) above the Teklanika River in 1.75 miles (2.8 km). This mountain's local descriptive name was shown on a 1916 USGS document, and the toponym has been officially adopted by the United States Board on Geographic Names.

== Climate ==
Based on the Köppen climate classification, Double Mountain is located in a tundra climate zone with long, cold, snowy winters, and mild summers. Winter temperatures can drop below −20 °F with wind chill factors below −30 °F. The months May through June offer the most favorable weather for climbing or viewing.

== Gallery ==
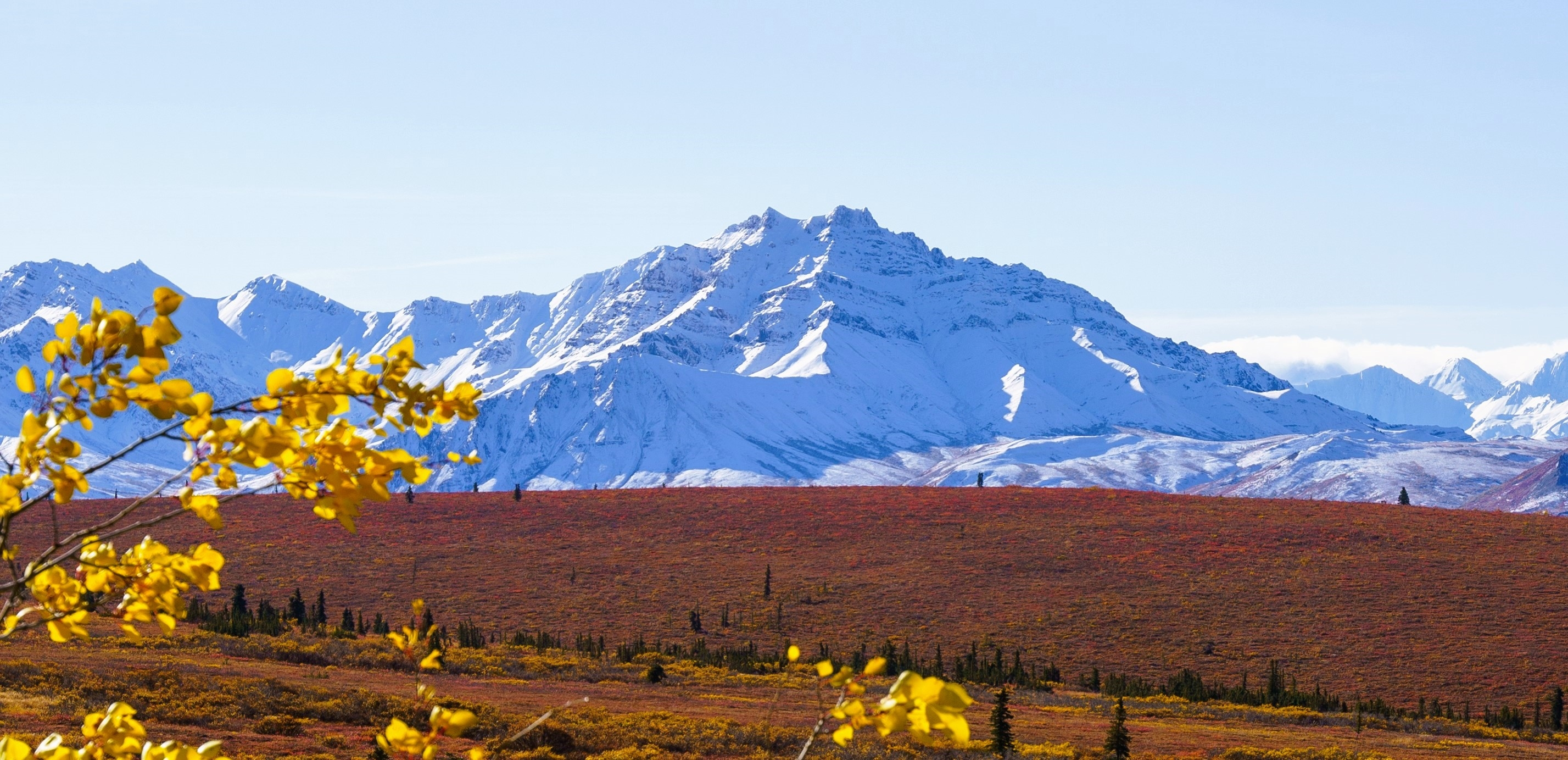
Northeast aspect

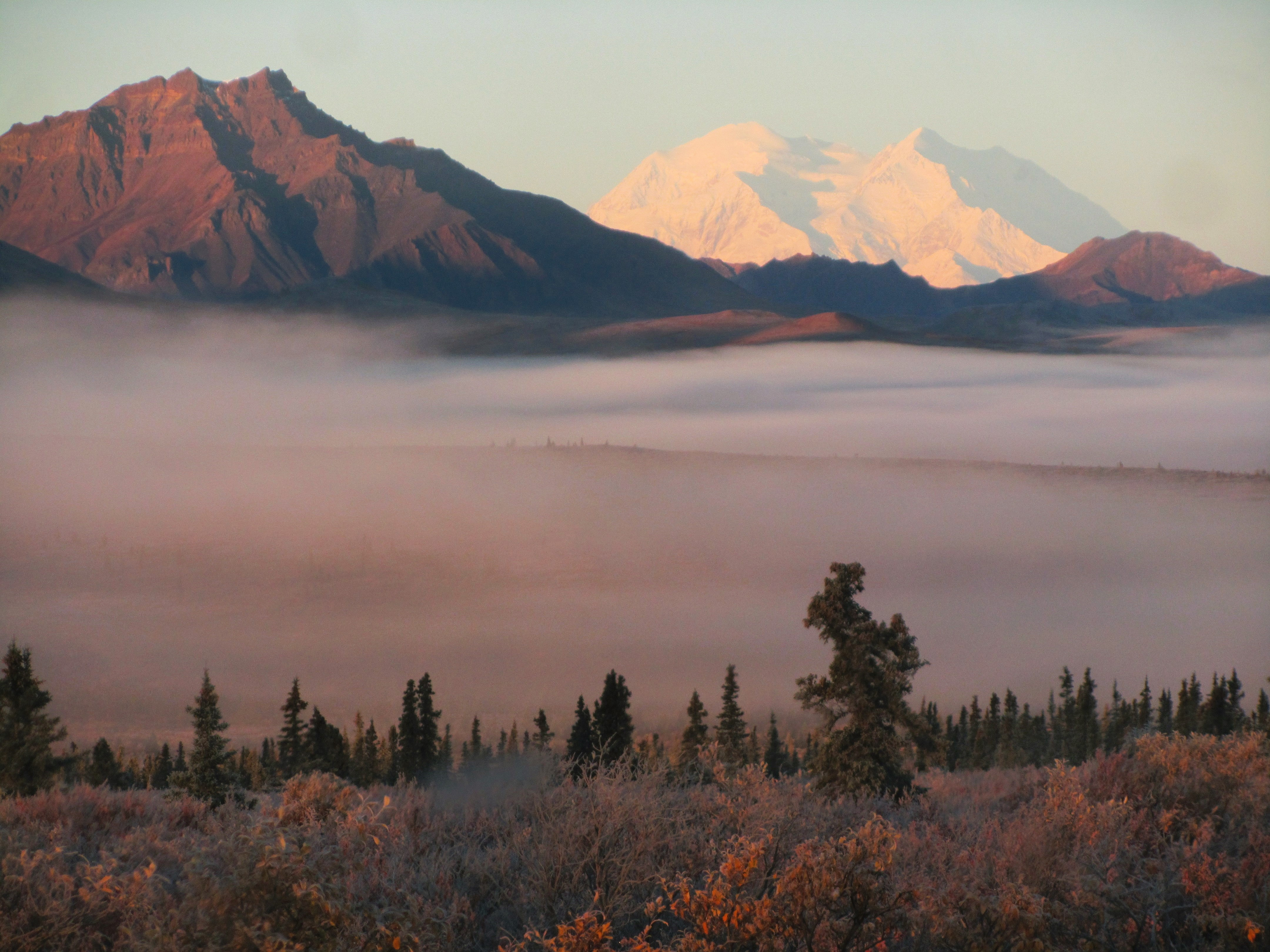
Double Mountain (left) and Denali

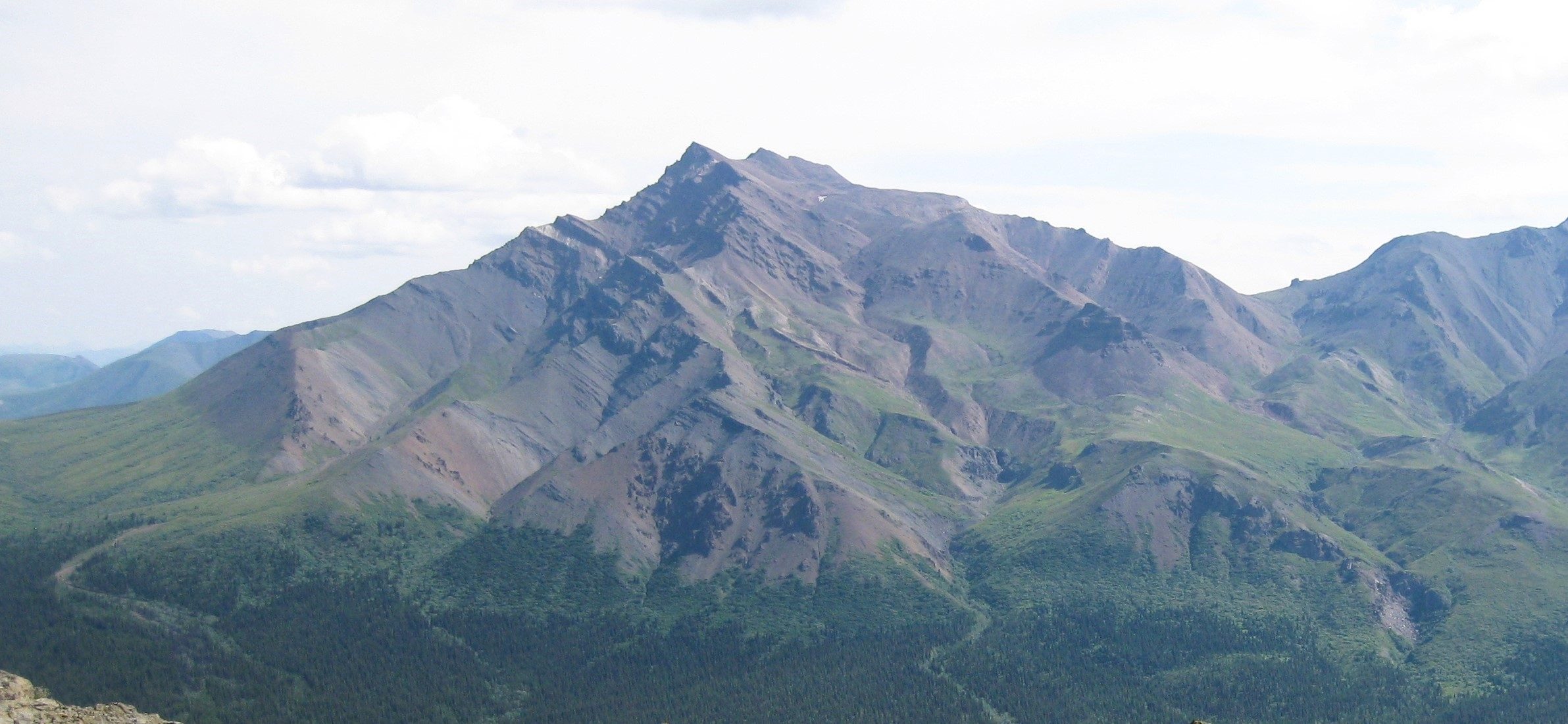
West aspect of Double Mountain viewed from Igloo Mountain

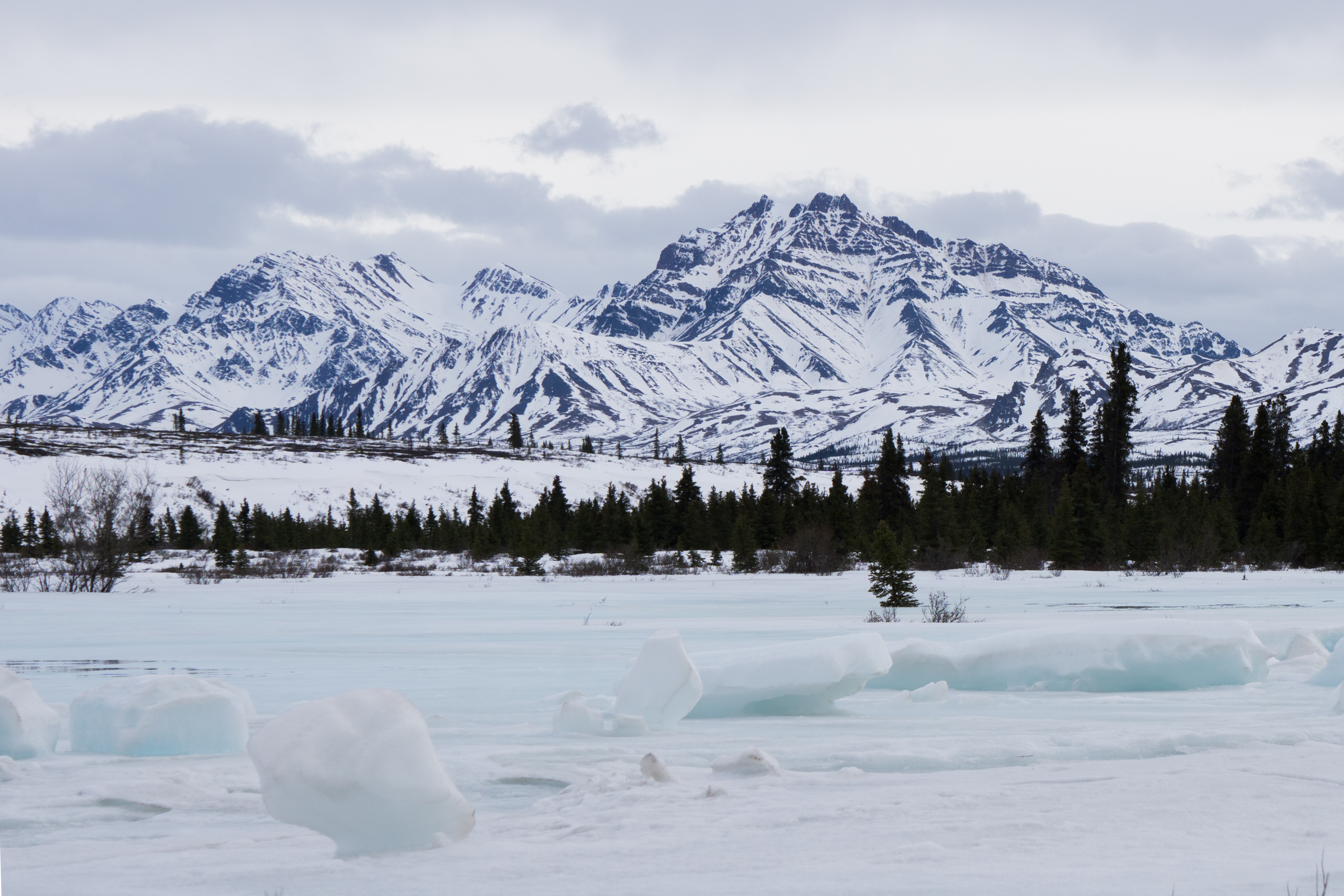
Double Mountain

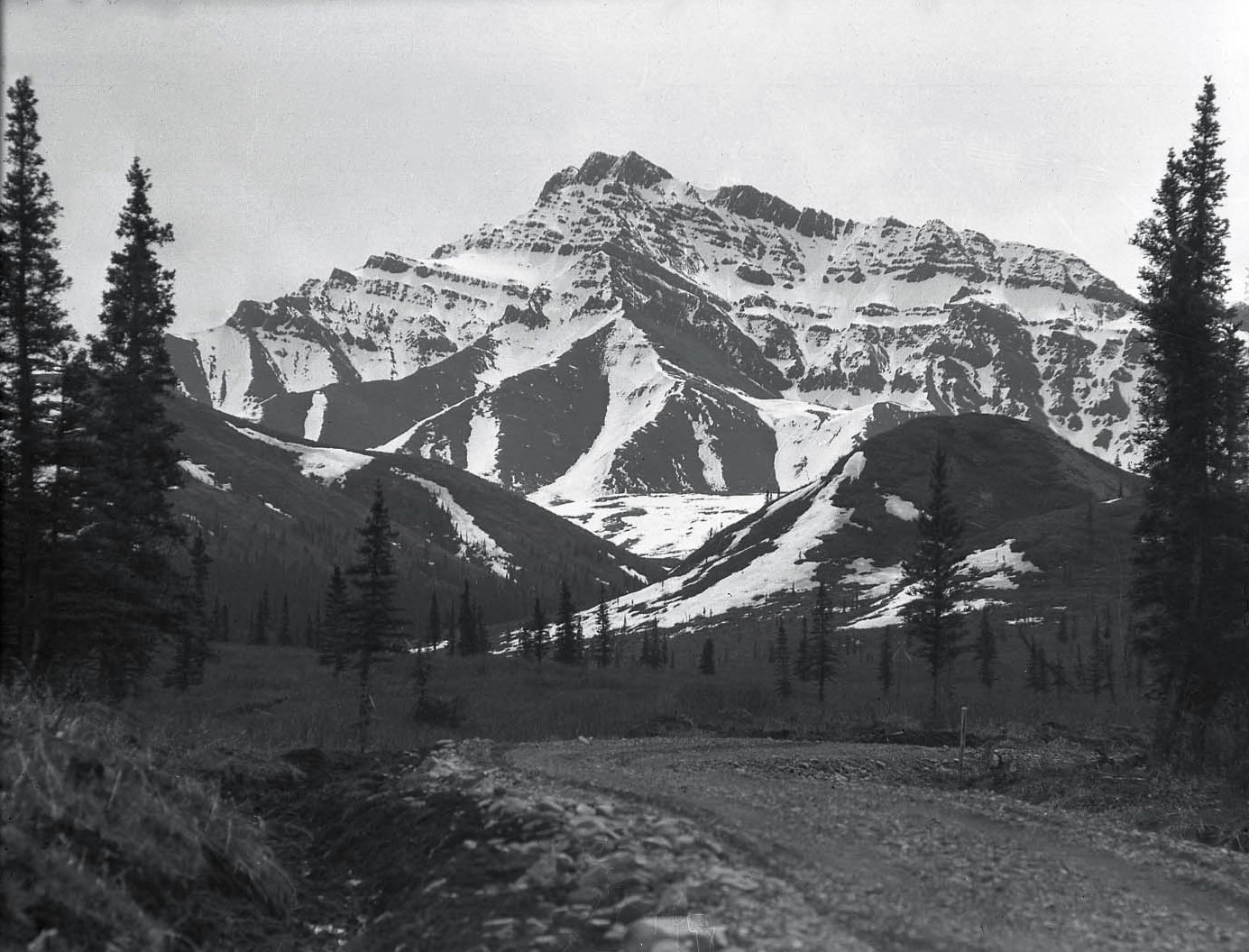
Northwest aspect in 1932

== See also ==
- List of mountain peaks of Alaska
- Geology of Alaska
- Igloo Mountain
