= Igloo Mountain =

Mountain in Alaska, United States

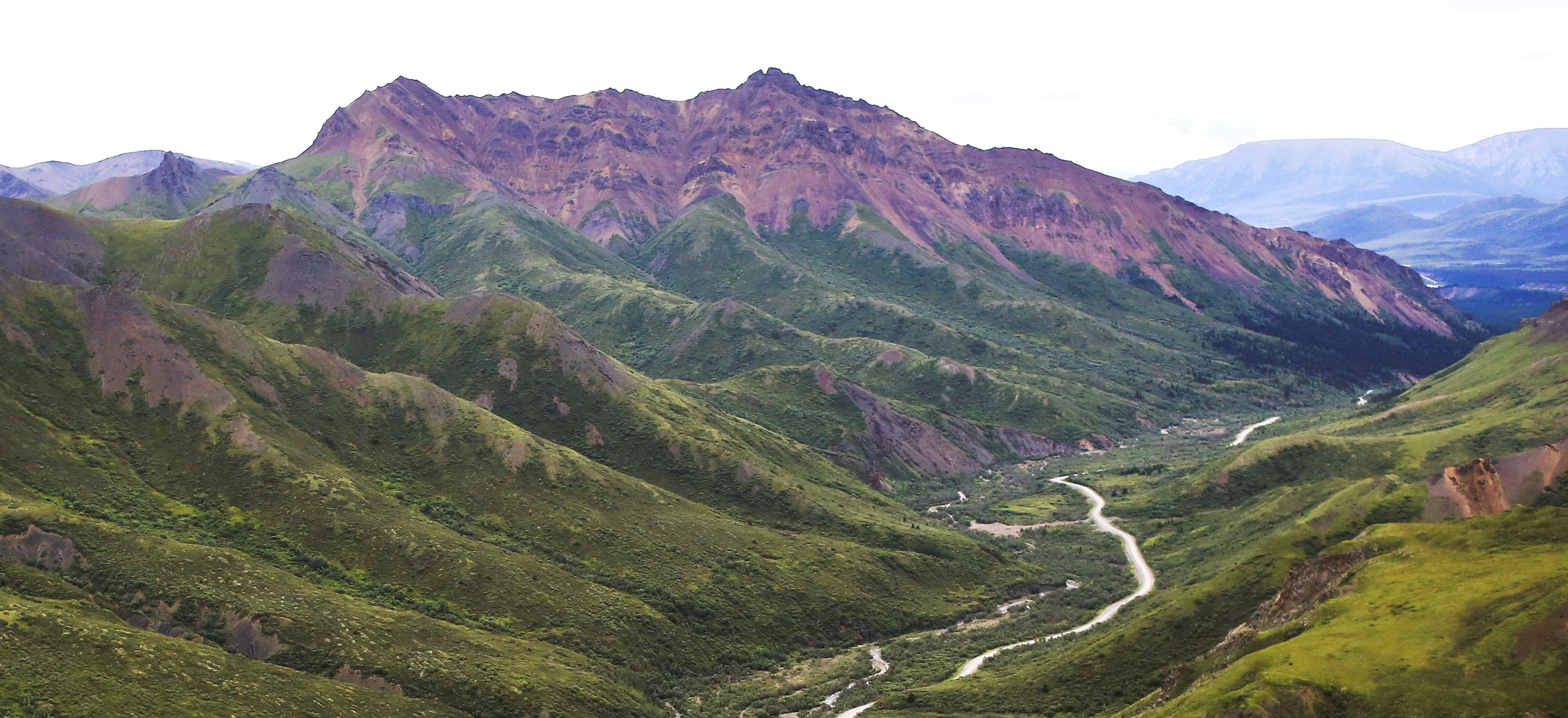
- South aspect

Highest point
- Elevation: 4,800 ft (1,463 m)
- Prominence: 900 ft (274 m)
- Parent peak: Peak 5250
- Isolation: 1.66 mi (2.67 km)
- Coordinates: 63°36′30″N 149°37′57″W

Geography
- Location within Alaska
- Interactive map of Igloo Mountain
- Country: United States
- State: Alaska
- Borough: Denali
- Protected area: Denali National Park
- Parent range: Alaska Range
- Topo map: USGS Healy C-6

Igloo Mountain is a 4,800 ft (1,460 m) summit in Alaska, United States.

== Description ==
Igloo Mountain is located in the Alaska Range in Denali National Park and Preserve. It is situated 4.93 miles (7.93 km) west of Double Mountain along the west side of Igloo Creek at mile 35 of the Park Road. Precipitation runoff from the mountain drains west into Big Creek and east into Igloo Creek, which are both tributaries of the Teklanika River. Topographic relief is significant as the summit rises 1,800 feet (550 meters) above Igloo Creek in one mile (1.6 km). This mountain was named in association with Igloo Creek; the name was published in 1954 by the U.S. Geological Survey; and the toponym has been officially adopted by the United States Board on Geographic Names.

== Climate ==
Based on the Köppen climate classification, Igloo Mountain is located in a tundra climate zone with long, cold, snowy winters, and mild summers. Winter temperatures can drop below −20 °F with wind chill factors below −30 °F. The months May through June offer the most favorable weather for climbing or viewing.

== Gallery ==
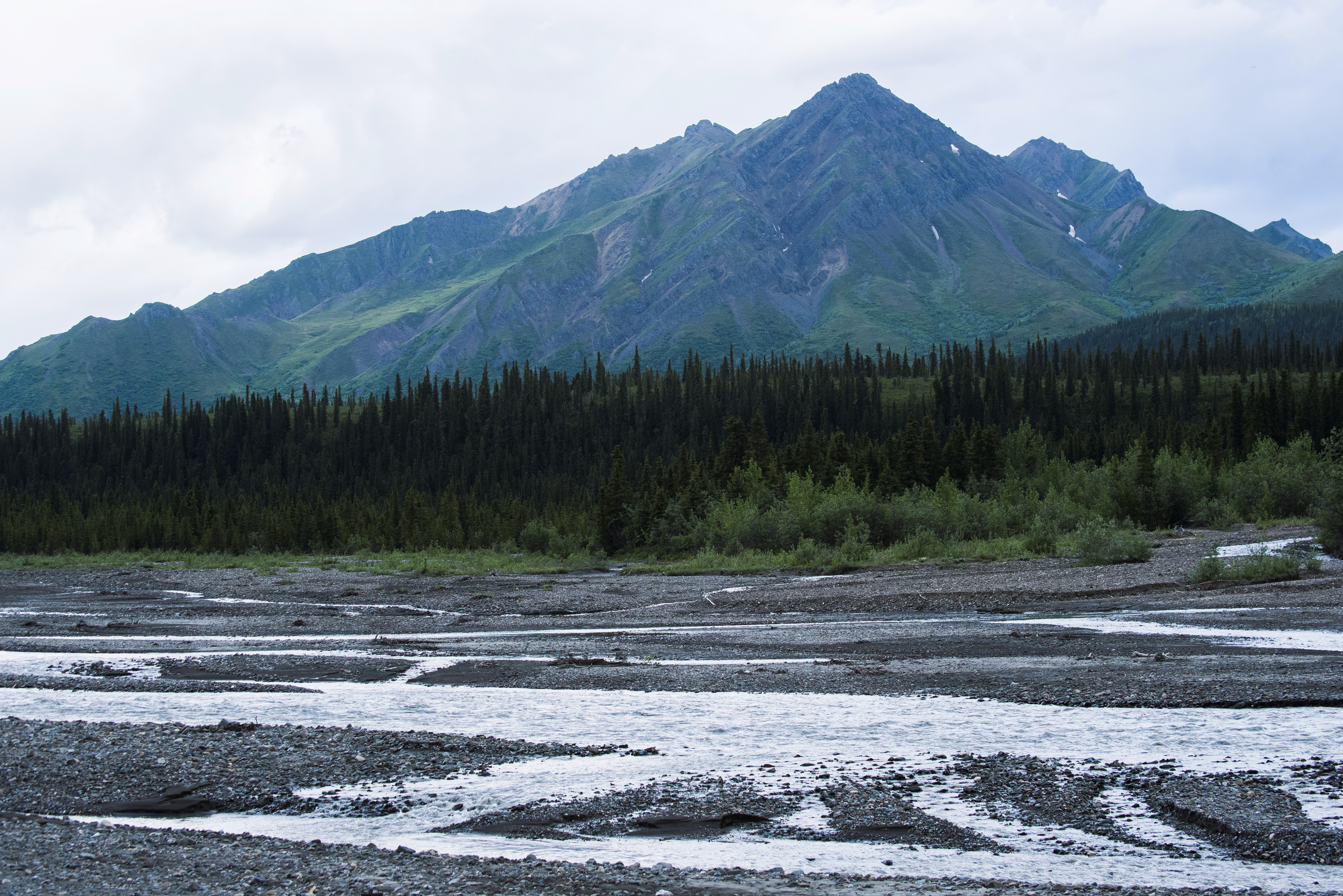
Northeast aspect, with Teklanika River

== See also ==
- List of mountain peaks of Alaska
- Geology of Alaska
