= Mount Silverthrone =

Mountain in Alaska, United States

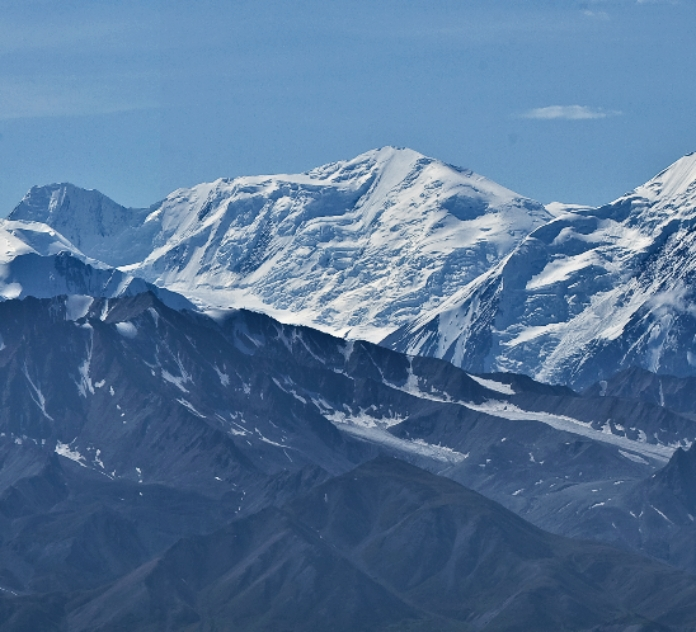
- Mount Silverthrone from the northeast

Highest point
- Elevation: 13,220 ft (4,030 m)
- Prominence: 3,240 ft (990 m)
- Listing: North America highest peaks 111th; US highest major peaks 92nd; Alaska highest major peaks 22nd
- Coordinates: 63°06′56.9″N 150°40′34.7″W

Geography
- Location within Alaska
- Location: Denali National Park and Preserve; Alaska, United States
- Parent range: Alaska Range
- Topo map: USGS Denali A-2

Climbing
- First ascent: 1945, Norman Bright and Frank P. Foster

Mount Silverthrone is a 13,220 ft (4,030 m) glaciated mountain summit located in Denali National Park and Preserve, in the Alaska Range, in the U.S. state of Alaska. It is situated 10.8 mi (17 km) east of Denali. The first ascent of this peak was made April 12, 1945, by Norman Bright and Frank P. Foster. It was so named by the U.S. Army Forces Cold Weather test party because of its stately appearance at the head of Brooks Glacier.

== Climate ==
Based on the Köppen climate classification, Mount Silverthrone is located in a subarctic climate zone with long, cold, snowy winters, and cool summers. Temperatures can drop below −20 °C (−4 °F) with wind chill factors below −30 °C (−22 °F). This climate supports glaciers on it slopes including the Brooks Glacier. Precipitation runoff from the mountain drains into tributaries of the McKinley River, which in turn is part of in the Tanana River drainage basin. The months May through June offer the most favorable weather for climbing or viewing.

== Gallery ==
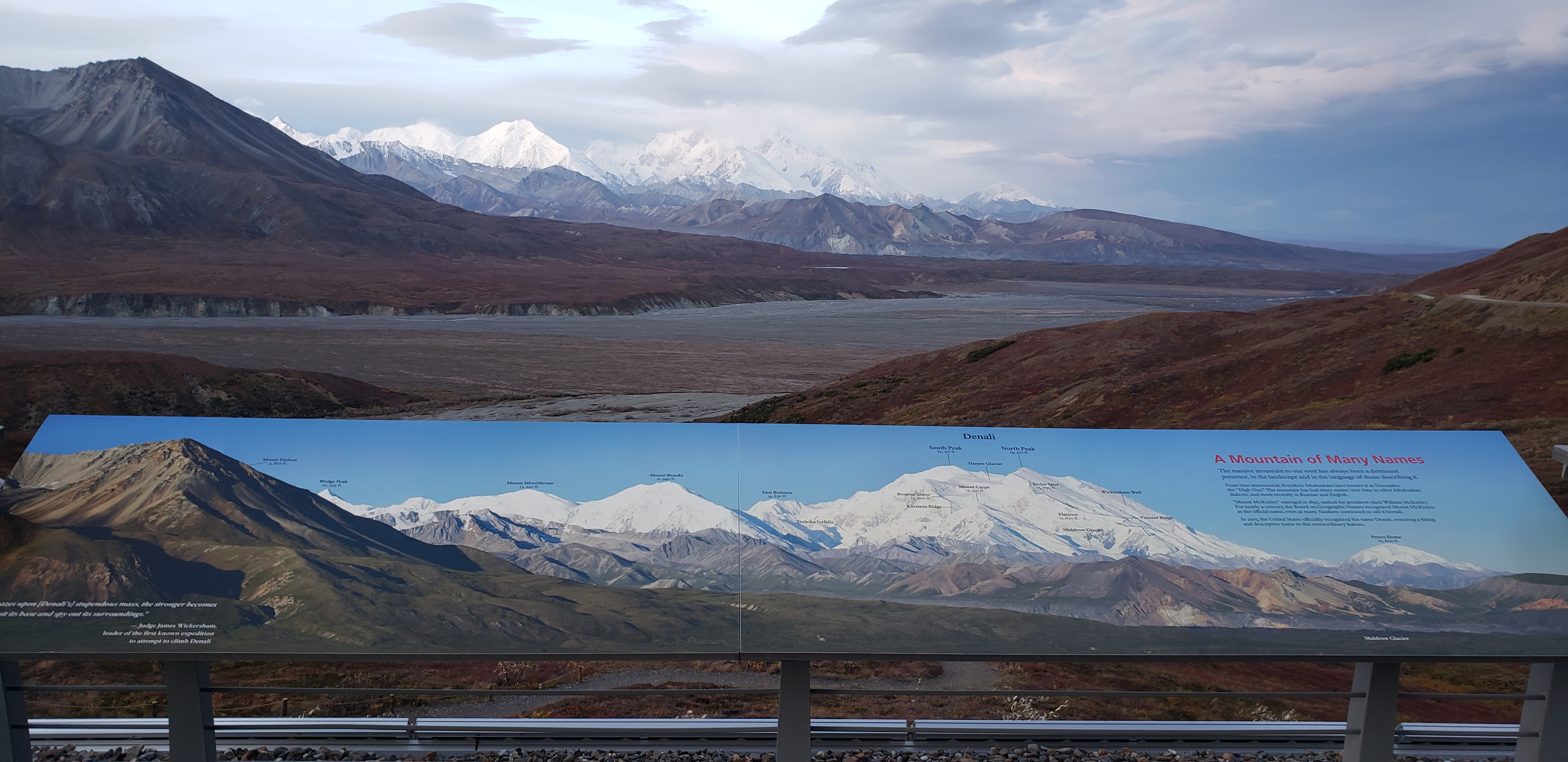

== See also ==
- List of mountain peaks of North America
  - List of mountain peaks of the United States
    - List of mountain peaks of Alaska
