= Mount Mather (Alaska) =

Mountain in Alaska, United States

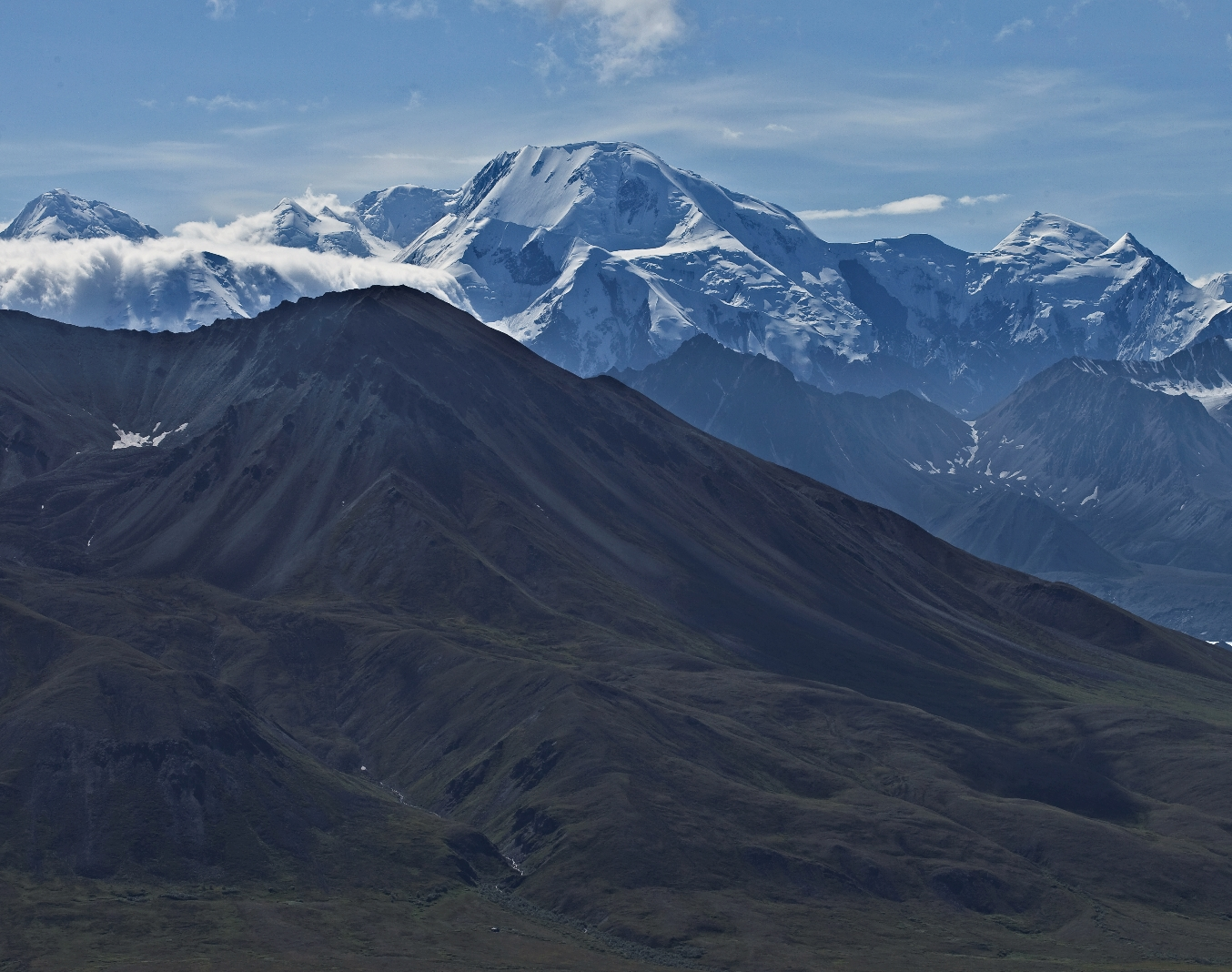
- Mount Mather, north aspect

Highest point
- Elevation: 12,096 ft (3,687 m)
- Prominence: 2,823 ft (860 m)
- Coordinates: 63°14′41″N 150°26′08″W

Geography
- Location within Alaska
- Interactive map of Mount Mather
- Location: Denali Borough, Alaska, United States
- Parent range: Alaska Range
- Topo map: USGS Denali A-1

Mount Mather is a 12,096-foot (3,687 m) mountain in the Alaska Range, in Denali National Park and Preserve. Mount Mather lies to the northeast of Denali, overlooking Brooks Glacier. The mountain itself is covered by glaciers. Mount Mather was named in 1947 in honor of National Park Service director Stephen Mather.

== Climate ==
Based on the Köppen climate classification, Mount Mather is located in a subarctic climate zone with long, cold, snowy winters, and mild summers. Temperatures can drop below −20 °C with wind chill factors below −30 °C. Precipitation runoff from the mountain drains into the Tanana River drainage basin. The months May through June offer the most favorable weather for climbing or viewing.

== Gallery ==
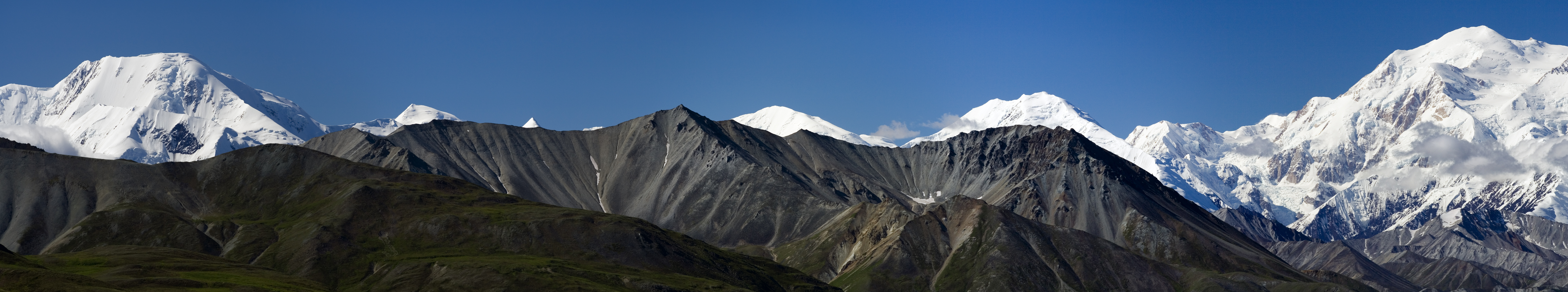
Mather to left, Eielson in center, Denali to the right

== See also ==
- Mountain peaks of Alaska
