= Polychrome Mountain =

Mountain in Alaska, United States

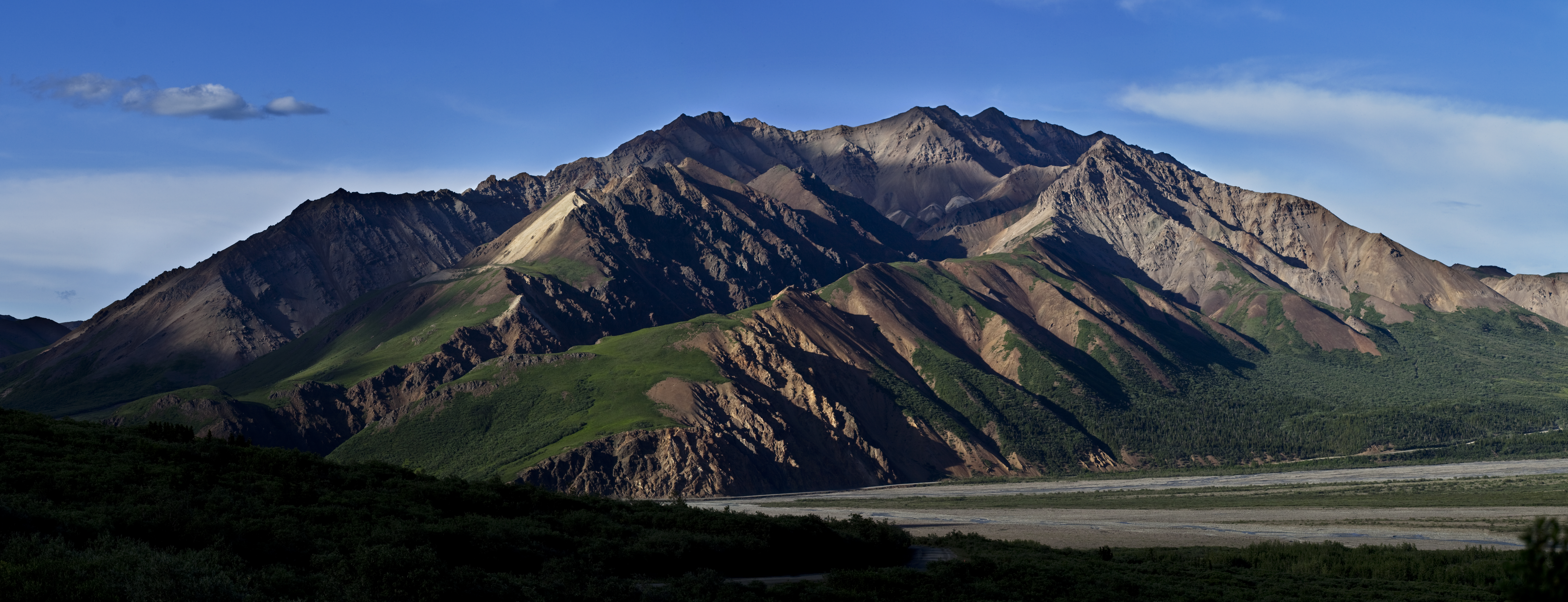
- Polychrome Mountain from the southwest

Highest point
- Elevation: 5,900 ft (1,798 m)
- Prominence: 2,300 ft (701 m)
- Parent peak: Sable Mountain
- Isolation: 5.39 mi (8.67 km)
- Coordinates: 63°32′19″N 149°57′18″W

Geography
- Location within Alaska
- Interactive map of Polychrome Mountain
- Location: Denali National Park and Preserve; Denali Borough; Alaska, United States
- Parent range: Alaska Range
- Topo map: USGS Healy C-6

Polychrome Mountain is a prominent 5,900+ ft (1,798+ m) elevation summit located in Denali National Park and Preserve, in the Alaska Range, in the U.S. state of Alaska. It is a landmark in the Toklat River valley visible to tourists as the park road traverses the southern slope of the mountain. Polychrome Mountain is situated one mile north of Polychrome Pass, and 3.44 mi (6 km) northeast of Divide Mountain. Although modest in elevation, relief is significant since the peak rises nearly 3,000 ft (910 m) above the surrounding valley floor in less than two miles. This mountain's descriptive name, meaning "many colors", was first published in 1954 by the U.S. Geological Survey, and is taken from the pass with the same name.

== Geology ==
About sixty million years ago, the mountain was part of a low plain composed of deep beds of gravel covered by ancient plants and varied animal life. The plain was uplifted and folded into mountains. Molten rock pushed into the gravel and some poured out of the surface as lava. As mountain-building forces continued to push the land skyward, rushing streams stripped the slopes of most of the original sands and gravels. Some were mixed and fused by volcanic rocks. The multi-hued lavas, intrusive rocks, and cemented gravels give the mountain its brilliant colors.

== Climate ==
Based on the Köppen climate classification, Polychrome Mountain is located in a subarctic climate zone with long, cold, snowy winters, and mild summers. Winter temperatures can drop below −20 °F with wind chill factors below −30 °F. Precipitation runoff from the mountain drains into the Toklat River, which in turn is part of the Tanana River drainage basin. The months May through June offer the most favorable weather for climbing or viewing.

== See also ==
- List of mountain peaks of Alaska
- Geology of Alaska

== Gallery ==
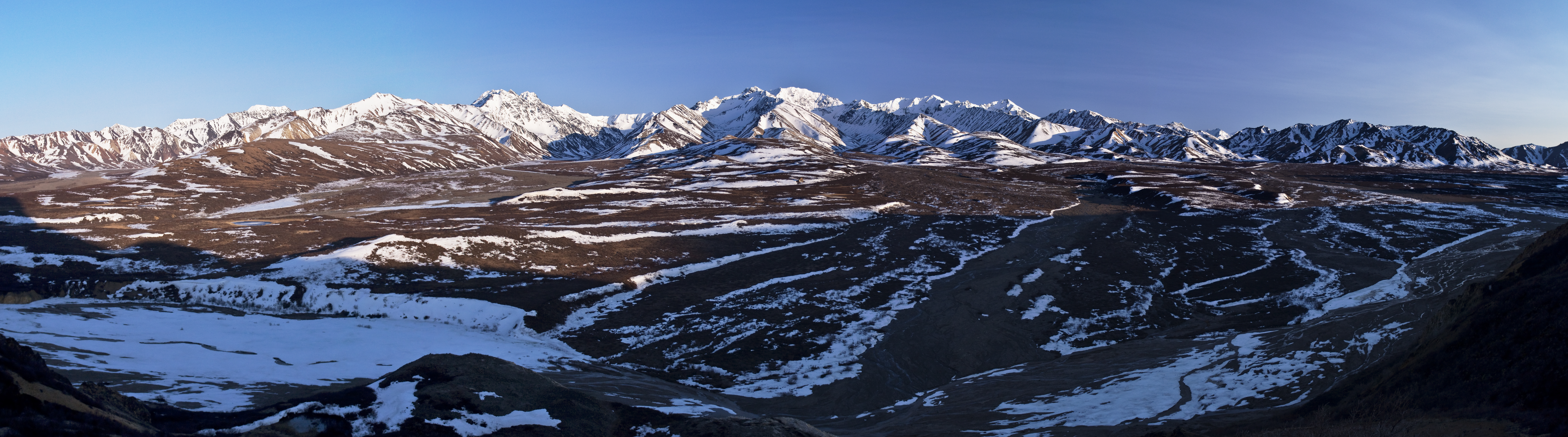
The view looking south from Polychrome Mountain

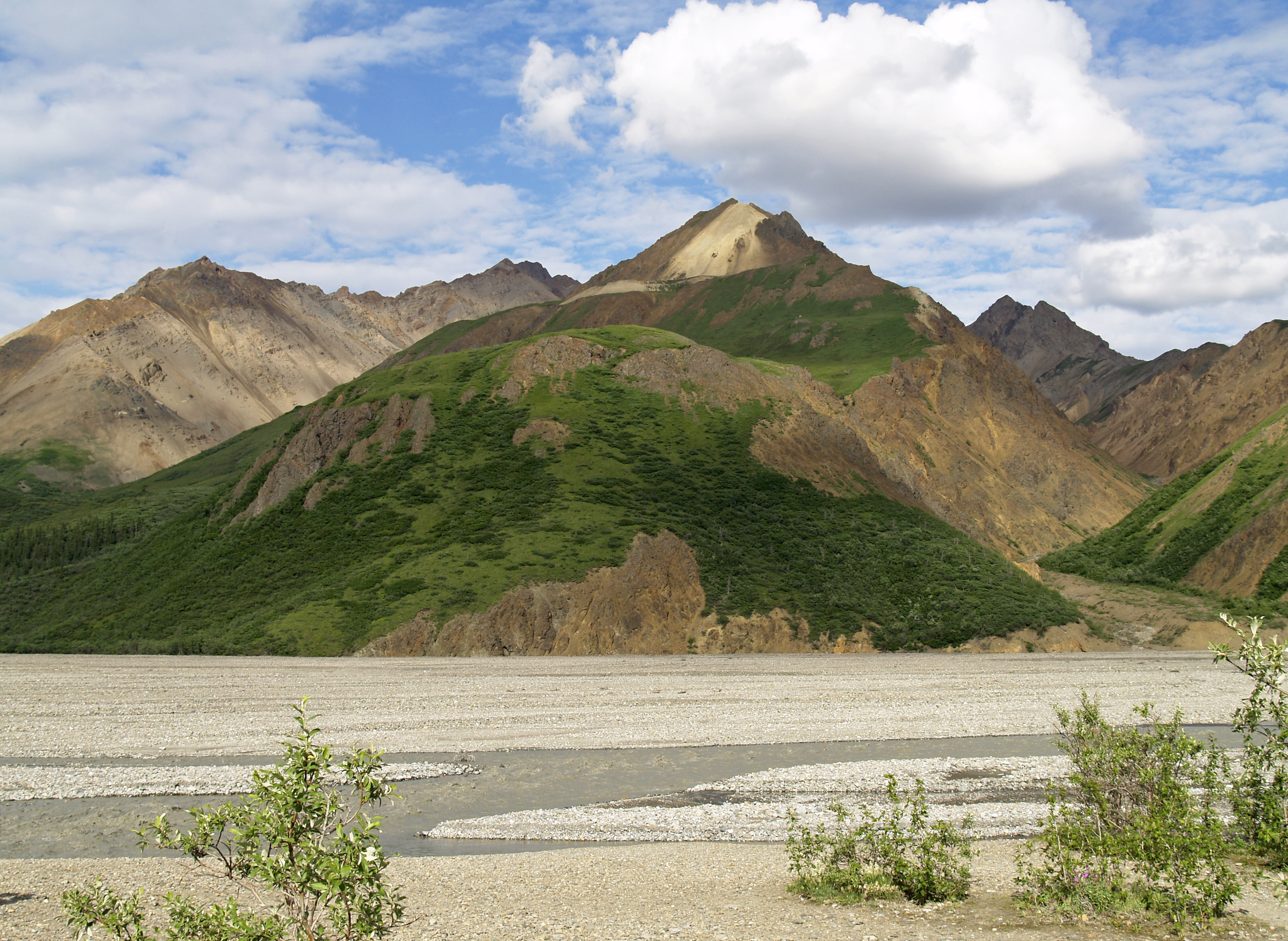
West aspect
