= Brooks Glacier =

Glacier in Alaska, United States

- Location within Alaska
- Interactive map of Brooks Glacier
- Type: Valley glacier
- Location: Denali Borough, Alaska, U.S.
- Coordinates: 63°09′18″N 150°36′08″W
- Length: 9 miles (14 km)

Brooks Glacier is a glacier in Denali National Park and Preserve in the U.S. state of Alaska. The glacier originates on the east face of Mount Silverthrone at Brooks Gap. The 9-mile (14 km) glacier moves northeast, joining Muldrow Glacier between Mount Brooks and Ragged Peak. Brooks Glacier was named by T.G. Gerdine of the U.S. Geological Survey circa 1900 for geologist Alfred Hulse Brooks.

== See also ==
- List of glaciers
