= Robert Campbell Reeve =

American pilot

- Bob Reeve
- Born: Robert Campbell Reeve; March 27, 1902; Waunakee, Wisconsin, U.S.
- Died: August 25, 1980 (aged 78)
- Occupations: Pilot, Airline owner
- Known for: Founding Reeve Aleutian Airways
- Political party: Republican
- Spouse: Janice ("Tilly") Morisette
- Children: Richard, Roberta, Janice, David, Whitham
- Parent(s): Hubert and Mae Reeve
- Relatives: Donald Sheldon (son-in-law)

Robert Campbell Reeve (March 27, 1902 – August 25, 1980) was an American pilot, who was the founder of Reeve Aleutian Airways. He was the Republican nominee for the 1952 House election against incumbent Bob Bartlett.

== Childhood ==
Reeve was born in Waunakee, Wisconsin, on March 27, 1902. He was one of twins, his brother was Richard. Their parents were Hubert and Mae Reeve. Mae died in 1904, and their father remarried, leaving the boys to fend for themselves. Bob and Richard went their separate ways early in life. Reeve was fascinated by aviation from an early age, and studied all he could on the subject. He enlisted in the US Army aged 15 in 1917. Discharged from the Army at the end of the war, Reeve had reached the rank of sergeant. He wanted to re-enlist, but his father was against this so Reeve returned to school, but dropped out after a few months and went to San Francisco. From there he got passage as an ordinary seaman to Shanghai, where he took a job in the Chinese Maritime Customs Service, serving on the Yangtze and Taku rivers. In 1921, Reeve was working in Vladivostok, USSR, but returned home as a result of his father's pleading.

Reeve finished high school, and then entered the University of Wisconsin–Madison in 1922, his brother already being there. A picture of the aviator Carl Ben Eielson was on the wall at the fraternity house, this inspired Reeve, George Gardner, Monk MacKinnon and Ora McMurray to skip classes to spend time at Madison airfield, where Cash Chamberlain had a Curtiss Jenny. Six months short of graduation, all four were expelled from the university. This pushed them further into aviation, with Gardner and MacKinnon becoming president and vice-president respectively of Northwest Airlines.

== Barnstorming days ==
Reeve headed to Florida, then to Beaumont, Texas, where he joined a pair of barnstormers—"Hazard" and "Maverick". In exchange for two months' work at the airfield, Reeve got three hours flying instruction (which was called five) and soloed. When the Air Commerce Act of 1926 came into force, he got one of the first Engine and Aircraft Mechanic's Licenses and his Commercial Pilot's License. Reeve joined the Army Air Corps at March Field, but was discharged after a short time.

== South America ==
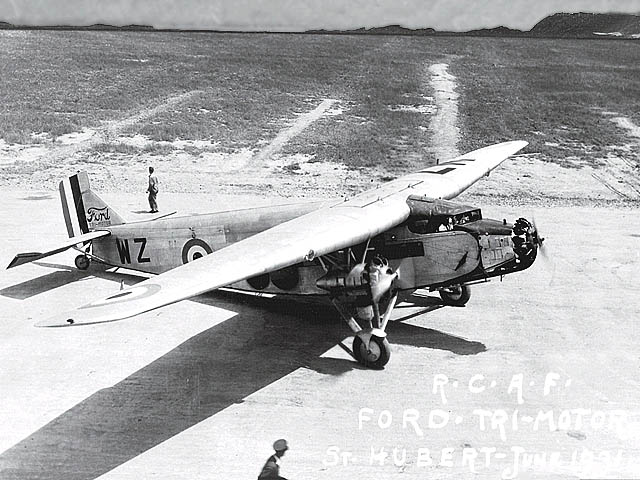
Ford Trimotor

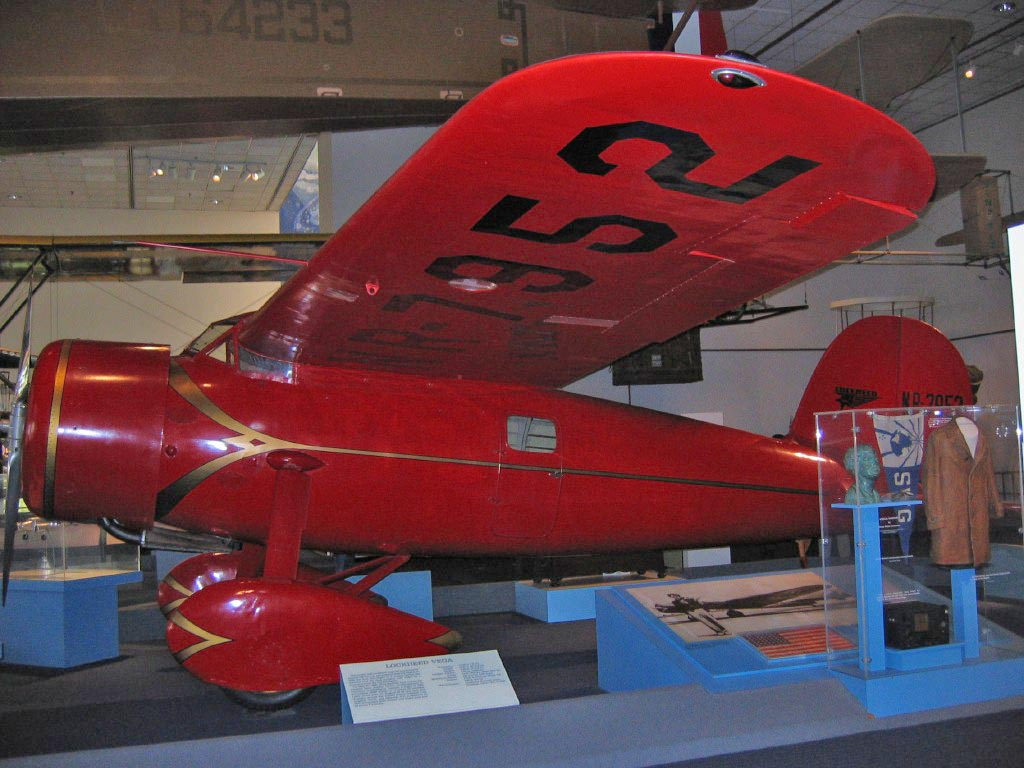
Lockheed Vega 5B

By the late 1920s, barnstorming wasn't a viable way to make a living. Pan Am teamed up with W. R. Grace and Company to bid for an airmail contract in South America. The new airline, Pan American-Grace Airways (Panagra) flew weekly airmail from the US to Lima, Peru via the Canal Zone. A Ford Trimotor was purchased and Reeve trained with the Ford Motor Company on these aircraft, delivering the first to Lima in August 1929. Panagra offered Reeve the chance to fly Airmail Route 9 from Lima to Santiago, Chile, at this time the longest aviation route in the world at 1,900 miles (3,100 km). In 1930 the route was extended to Montevideo, Uruguay. It was during this time that Reeve learned about bush flying, developing techniques to avoid coastal fog, which later served him in Alaska, and mountain flying skills. He established a speed record between Santiago and Lima, covering the 1,900 miles in 20 hours. In January 1932, he crashed a Lockheed Vega of Panagra at Santiago, and quit before he was fired.

== Alaska ==
Reeve's move to Alaska came as the result of unrelated incidents. He had met a Klondike prospector, Swiftwater Bill, in Chile, who had told him of the Gold Rush thirty years earlier. He had also talked to Eddie Craig, a mining engineer at the Kennicott Copper Mine in Alaska in the early 1900s. These stories, and the idea that there was new country to conquer pulled Reeve north. He returned home to Wisconsin, where he suffered a slight attack of polio, which affected one of his legs slightly.

Reeve stowed away on a steamship, arriving in Alaska with $2 in his pocket, and Valdez, Alaska, with 20¢. At Valdez airfield, Owen Meals had a wrecked Eaglerock aircraft with a Wright J-5 engine that had been a spare for Sir Hubert Wilkins when he made his flight across the North Pole to Spitsbergen.

Reeve worked for a month at $1 an hour repairing the plane, and then leased the plane from Meals at $10 an hour. Having created a landing strip, Reeve was in business. His first charter was to Middleton Island, where the beach looked fine to land on, but the aircraft sank up to its wheels in the soft sand. An old block and tackle was found and used to rescue the aircraft from the incoming tide. Reeve managed to take off, and attempted to fly back to Valdez, but was forced to land at Seward owing to a storm. When he eventually got back to Valdez his tanks were almost empty, and he hadn't earned a cent. Reeve said this trip was worth $1,000 in experience. Reeve quickly learnt that the bush pilot's biggest worry was paying for gas, which could be $0.25 a gallon in one place, and $1.50 in another.

That winter, Reeve was hired to fly supplies to Chisana at 20¢/lb, his base for this was at Christochina, where a small airstrip had been created with high obstacles each end of the runway. Oil in the aircraft engines had to be drained each night, and warmed up on a stove each morning before being returned to the engine, as it was so cold that the oil would freeze. Reeve made a $2,000 profit on the Chisana route and had heard of a Fairchild 51 for sale in Fairbanks. This was the type of aircraft he had used in the Andes. He bought it for $3,500, with $1,500 down and the balance within two years.

== Reputation earned ==
Reeve's first trip in the Fairchild was to fly Mr and Mrs Ole Hay and their two children, aged 4 and 4 months, to Nome. Just out of McGrath, they ran into dense ice-fog, a complete white out, so Reeve landed on the frozen Kateel River and then made camp. After 25 hours, conditions had improved sufficiently for them to continue as far as Shaktoolik. It took three days to get to Nome, and another ten days before he could leave for Valdez, picking up a medical emergency in Shaktoolik on the way. Again Reeve had to land because of the weather, this time landing on the Skwentna River. Reeve flew the patient to Seward the next day, and when he eventually returned to Valdez, Reeve found that stories of his outward trip were in the newspapers.

== Tilly ==
In March 1933, Reeve took an order into Chisana. On the way back to Valdez his engine quit and he made a forced landing by Mount Wrangell. He and his passenger used snowshoes to walk the 20 miles (32 km) to the Nabesna Mine, where owner Carl Whitham assisted them. They returned to Valdez for help, got the spare parts to repair the engine and flew back to the plane, where the three men repaired the engine, using a tree to hoist it clear of the aircraft.

During the Great Depression, there was constant talk of reopening the gold mines. One of the biggest was the Big Four Mine on the Brevier Glacier, only 30 miles (48 km) from Valdez, but at an elevation of 6,000 feet (1,800 m). Clarence Poy of San Francisco said he would buy the mine if Reeve flew his supplies and men in. Reeve took the current owner, Jack Cook to the mine to inspect it. The landing spot turned out not to be as good as had been claimed, but although the aircraft was partially buried in soft snow, no damage was done. Reeve later marked out a landing strip with flags and lamp black.

Reeve's success with supplying the Big Four Mine let to further contracts with other mines; the Mayfield, Little Giant and Ramsay Rutherford. During this time, Reeve learned more about assessing suitability of landing sites from the air, and developed the technique of dropping supplies by air. Miners being so keen on getting their supplies that they would pay for another load if supplies were damaged when dropped. In 1934, the price of gold almost doubled under the New Deal Gold Reserve Act and Valdez boomed. In the summer of 1934, Reeve's exploits, including landing on mudflats (having manufactured skis from stainless steel to fit to his aircraft) regularly reached the papers. He received some fan letters, including one from Miss Janice Morisette, who asked if he needed an extra hand. Janice lived about 30 miles from Reeve's hometown. They corresponded for a few months and Janice flew to Valdez in June 1935. Reeve left on a prospecting trip to Canada, but his curiosity got the better of him and he returned within a month. When he first saw her she reminded him of "Tilly the Toiler" and thus the nickname stuck.

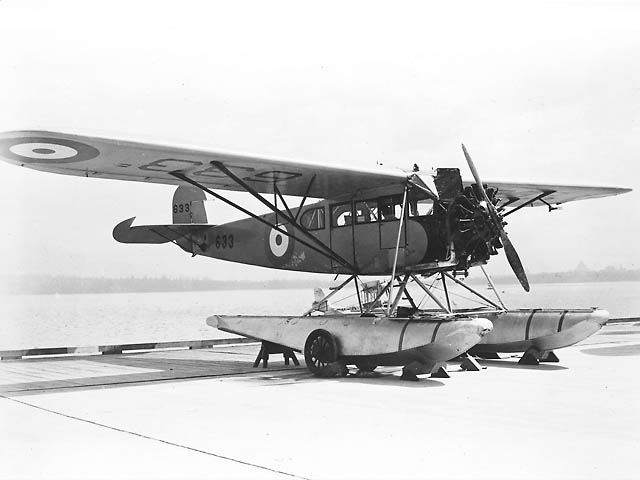
Fairchild 71

Reeve tried his hand at mining, and joined with prospector Andy Thompson to prospect the Ruff & Tuff Mine. He went to Canada in 1936 to try placer mining to finance the Ruff & Tuff. The mining didn't pay, so Reeve returned to Valdez flying supplies. He earned enough money to buy basic equipment for the Ruff & Tuff and later he and Thompson sold the mine, with Reeve getting the contract to supply it. Morisette had returned to San Francisco in the meantime, but she returned in April 1936. Reeve decided that despite his sporadic income, he would marry Morisette and so they were married in Fairbanks. Reeve bought another plane, a Fairchild 71, to celebrate.

== Expedition ==
Reeve made several modifications to his plane, which he tried to keep from the local inspector. When questioned about these, his answers resulted in official approval from the inspector for the modifications.

Reeve received a letter from Bradford Washburn in January 1937 asking if he could fly a party of climbers to the glacier at the base of Mount Lucania in Canada. Reeve agreed to undertake the task. In April, the bulk of the supplies were flown in. When he flew Washburn and Robert Bates to the site, the weather had turned unseasonably warm and the plane sank up to its belly in slush. It was over a week before Reeve could take off, after the temperature had dropped sufficiently for a crust of ice to form over the slush. The trip was described by Reeve as the "most hazardous" of his career, but he had set a new world record of 8,750 feet (2,670 m) for the highest landing on skis, more than 1,800 feet (550 m) higher than any in either the Arctic or Antarctic.

The day after the Washburn trip, the engine of the Fairchild 51 quit. Reeve spent eight months repairing the Wright Whirlwind engine, but never put it back in the aircraft. He was now back to only one. Reeve made his last glacier landing in 1938, when he flew Brad Washburn to the Mount Marcus Glacier. His brother Richard was killed in a plane crash in 1938 and in the spring of 1939 a storm overturned the Fairchild 71. He spent all summer repairing it, only for the hangar to burn down with the aircraft inside. Reeve bought another Fairchild 71 and spent a further month repairing it. At this time, the CAA came in to regulate flying in Alaska. Pilots were assigned routes under a "grandfather rights" scheme based on the territory they had served for four months prior to August 22, 1938. Reeve was given a small area around Copper River. The work available would not support a growing family (at this time they had two children, Richard and Roberta) so they left Valdez in January 1941 for Fairbanks.

== The war years ==
Reeve arrived in Fairbanks and had to borrow $65 to pay his first month's rent. Noel Wien gave Reeve his first charter, and a lifelong friendship was formed. In April 1941, Reeve was one of a few pilots in Alaska without a certified route, and was hired by the CAA to survey the many new airfields planned to be built as part of Hap Arnold's master plan for Alaska's defense. While the Army and Navy concentrated on building bases at Anchorage and in the Aleutian Islands, the CAA was responsible for constructing the airfields in the interior.

The first to be built was the airfield at Northway, 100 miles (160 km) east of Fairbanks. The contractors were the Morrison-Knudsen company (M-K). Supplies were trucked via the Richardson Highway and a summer trail to the Nasbena Mines, 60 miles from the airfield site, and then flown by Reeve to Northway, where an airstrip had been hacked out of the woods. Some items had to be cut into two or three pieces and re-welded at the destination as they were too big or heavy for the Fairchild.

Although Reeve was working from dawn to dusk, he couldn't keep up with demand for supplies at Northway, and a backlog built up at Nabesna. M-K ordered a Boeing 80A and Reeve was sent to Seattle to collect it. It took five weeks to modify the plane, and when he returned with it to Northway, found a 3,000 feet (910 m) runway at what was now Reeve Field. The 80A was designed to haul 4,000 pounds (1,800 kg) but Reeve soon found he could haul 7,000 pounds (3,200 kg) in it. Reeve was again flying from dawn to dusk, sometimes on only two engines.

With the money earned from the CAA contract, Reeve ordered three more aircraft. He bought another Boeing 80A, a Hamilton Metalplane and another Fairchild 71. The army wanted him to survey a route for a railroad from Prince George, BC, to Nome. Reeve took the surveyors along the route but on the homeward trip the aircraft—a Fairchild—broke through the ice on the Kluane Lake. The aircraft was abandoned but the mission successfully completed. The pass was named Reeve Pass, it is located between Francis Lake and the Salmon River. The Fairchild was left at Burwash Landing, and Reeve hired a pilot to fly the Hamilton from Washington to Alaska. The plane crashed in Washington, killing the pilot and Reeve was broke again, not having enough money even to buy the fuel to fly the Boeing to Alaska. He managed to borrow money from the Pacific National Bank despite them having a rule never to lend to bush pilots.

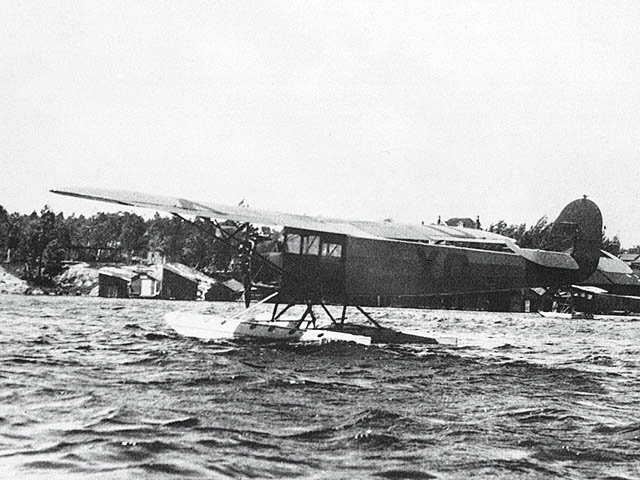
Fairchild FC-2W-2

Reeve flew back to Juneau unannounced, and was almost shot down because he didn't identify himself. He returned to working for the CAA, now earning $80 an hour with fuel supplied flying supplies, materials and workers to the new airfields being constructed at Big Delta, Tanacross, Galena, Moses Point and Nome, doing all the flying and maintenance himself and regularly working 15-hour days. In November 1942 Reeve signed a contract with the Alaska Communications System (ACS) and moved his family to Anchorage. The contract with ACS involved flying all over Alaska, the Aleutians and western Canada. On July 5, 1943, Reeve was flying radar equipment and four technicians from Cold Bay to Amchitka when he ran into zero-zero visibility conditions. During 1942 Reeve purchased a Fairchild FC-2W-2. A forced landing was made 20 miles east of Cold Bay. Reeve managed to salvage his radio, but the uninsured plane was written off. The delay in the delivery of the radar parts allowed the Japanese to evacuate Kiska undetected, which may have saved American lives, as when US forces landed on Kiska they found it deserted. Previously the Battle of Attu had cost 500 lives.

Reeve's thoughts turned to post-war activities. He knew he would need bigger, faster planes and thought his best hope would be to pick an area that no one else wanted. Reeve bought a hardware store on Fourth Avenue, Anchorage. An old friend, Carl Whitham came to Anchorage, and they formed a partnership to develop some of Whitham's old prospects. Whitham died of cancer in the spring and Reeve's prospecting days were over.

In 1946, Reeve formed Reeve Aleutian Airways and was its president until his death in 1980. He allowed his pilot's license to lapse in 1948 after he caught himself missing an item on a checklist. Reeve was invited to run for territorial governor of Alaska in 1952, but decided against this due to a conflict of interests. Reeve received an honorary doctor of science degree at the University of Alaska in 1963. Reeve was named "Alaskan of the Year" in 1972 and inducted into the National Aviation Hall of Fame in 1975. He was made honorary mayor of Shemya in 1978. He died on August 25, 1980, and in that year was inducted into the International Aerospace Hall of Fame. The Alaska Aviation Heritage Museum inducted Reeve into the Alaska Aviation Pioneer Hall of Fame on February 25, 2005. The Bob Reeve High School in Adak, Alaska was named after him.

In 1980, Reeve was inducted into the International Air & Space Hall of Fame at the San Diego Air & Space Museum.

== Personal life ==
Bob and Tilly Reeve had five children: Richard, Roberta, Janice, David, and Whitham. Richard became President of Reeve Aleutian upon the death of his father, Janice remained as a vice president of the airline, Roberta married famed bush pilot Don Sheldon, Whitham formed his own engineering business, and David became Senior Vice President of Midwest Airlines and President/CEO of Skyway Airlines in Milwaukee, Wisconsin.

== Aircraft ==
Reeve's aircraft included:

=== Boeing 80A ===
- NC224M c/n 1082. Ex Boeing Air Transport (United Air Lines). Rebuilt as an 80A-1 in 1930. To Monterey Peninsula Airways in 1939, then via Charles H Babb to the Morrison-Knudsen Construction Company. Accident on March 21, 1943, at Anchorage, repaired with parts from NC229M. Given to Reeve in 1946, sat outside Reeve's hangar until 1960 when hauled to the Anchorage landfill. Rescued before being buried and passed to Boeing Management Association. Aircraft and spares flown to McChord Air Base near Seattle and stored. Eventually restored by Pacific Northwest Aviation Historical Foundation at Auburn and displayed at the Museum of Flight, Seattle. It is the sole surviving Boeing 80.
- NC229M c/n 1087. Parts from this aircraft were used to repair NC224M after that aircraft had been involved in an accident on March 21, 1943, at Anchorage.
- NC793K c/n 1081. Purchased 1942, written off near Cold Bay, Alaska July 5, 1943.

=== Hamilton Metalplane ===
Reeve purchased a Hamilton Metalplane, but it crashed on the delivery flight.

=== Lockheed Vega 5B ===
- N9424 Reeve flew a Lockheed Vega when with Panagra in South America. An accident at Santiago led to his resignation and move to Alaska. He is pictured in front of N9424 in Flying Beats Work.

=== Fairchild 51 ===
- NC5364 c/n 102.

=== Fairchild 71 ===
- NC119H c/n 657. Ex Marine Airways. Bought in the winter if 1939/40 to replace NC9745.
- NC9745 c/n 611. This was the aircraft that was blown over, then destroyed in a hangar fire when repairs were nearly complete.

=== Fairchild FC-2W-2 ===
- NC7034 c/n 136. Ex Utah Oil Refining Company. Bought by Reeve in 1941/42, the frame of the fuselage is currently on display at the Alaska Aviation Heritage Museum.

=== Ford Tri-motor ===
- NC8416 c/n 54.
