= Robert Bates (mountaineer) =

American mountaineer, author and teacher (1911–2007)

Robert Hicks Bates (January 14, 1911 – September 13, 2007) was an American mountaineer, author and teacher, who is best remembered for his parts in the first ascent of Mount Lucania and the American 1938 expedition and 1953 expedition to K2.

== Early life ==
Bates was born in Philadelphia and was the son of William Bates, a classical scholar at the University of Pennsylvania. He briefly attended the William Penn Charter School, and then Phillips Exeter Academy. He attended Harvard University from 1929 to 1935. At Harvard he was a member of the Harvard Mountaineering Club and with Charles Houston, Adams Carter, Bradford Washburn and Terris Moore was part of the group of climbers later known as the "Harvard Five" who would push forward the standards of American mountaineering in the 1930s.

== Mount Lucania ==
In 1937 Bates, with Bradford Washburn, made the first ascent of Mount Lucania in Yukon, which was then the highest unclimbed mountain in North America. It was also one of the most remote and inaccessible and had been declared "virtually impregnable". The pair enlisted the aid of the pilot Robert Reeve to fly them to the mountain, but when they landed on the Walsh Glacier the aeroplane sank into the unexpectedly soft snow. After they had spent five days digging it out Reeve departed, warning Bates and Washburn that he would not be able to return to collect them as planned and that they would have to walk back to civilization. The pair climbed Mount Lucania, and the nearby Mount Steele, and were then faced with a 100-mile (160 km) trek through wilderness to Burwash Landing, without maps. They abandoned some of their food to save weight, expecting to restock at a cache left behind by an earlier expedition. However, the cache had been plundered by bears, and Bates and Washburn survived on mushrooms and squirrels during the trek out. Flooded rivers forced them to detour many miles out of their way, and they had eventually walked an estimated 156 miles by the time they reached Burwash Landing, 32 days after arriving on the glacier. The two men lost around twenty pounds each during the walk out.

== K2 ==
In 1937, Charles Houston invited Bates on an expedition to K2 for 1938, the world's second highest mountain. It was the first expedition to the mountain for nineteen years, and while the focus was on reconnaissance and assessing the feasibility of different routes, Bates was part of a group which reached within 800 m of the summit on the Abruzzi Spur, which would become the preferred route on the mountain. Bates and Houston returned to K2 with a new expedition in 1953. The expedition failed due to bad weather and the illness of Art Gilkey, but was widely praised for the courage shown by the team in their unsuccessful attempt to save Gilkey. During the descent, Bates and five other climbers were involved in a near-fatal fall, saved only by the strength of Pete Schoening, who was the last man on the rope. Bates later received the David A. Sowles Memorial Award for his part in the attempted rescue.

== Wartime and after ==
During the Second World War Bates served in the United States Army and was assigned to the Office of the Quartermaster general, where he worked on the development of improved equipment and clothing for the army's mountain divisions. He recruited a skilled wartime team that included mountaineers William P. House, Walter A. Wood III, Bestor Robinson, H. Adams Carter, Terris Moore, Bradford Washburn and Australian arctic explorer Hubert Wilkins. He reached the rank of lieutenant colonel and was awarded a Bronze Star and the Legion of Merit.

After the war, Bates taught English at Phillips Exeter Academy. He continued mountaineering throughout his life, and at the age of 74 led an expedition which made the first ascent of Ulugh Muztagh in China. He also spent a year in Kathmandu directing a Peace Corps project, and served as president of the American Alpine Club, which awards the Robert Hicks Bates Award to promising young climbers in his honour.

== Author ==
Bates was the author of several books. With Charles Houston he wrote accounts of their two K2 expeditions as Five Miles High and K2 - The Savage Mountain; the latter being regarded as a mountaineering classic. He also wrote Mystery, Beauty, and Danger, a study of mountaineering literature, and Mountain Man: The Story of Belmore Brown, the biography of an artist and explorer. His autobiography, The Love of Mountains Is Best, was published in 1994.
