= Propeller strike =

Type of aircraft accident

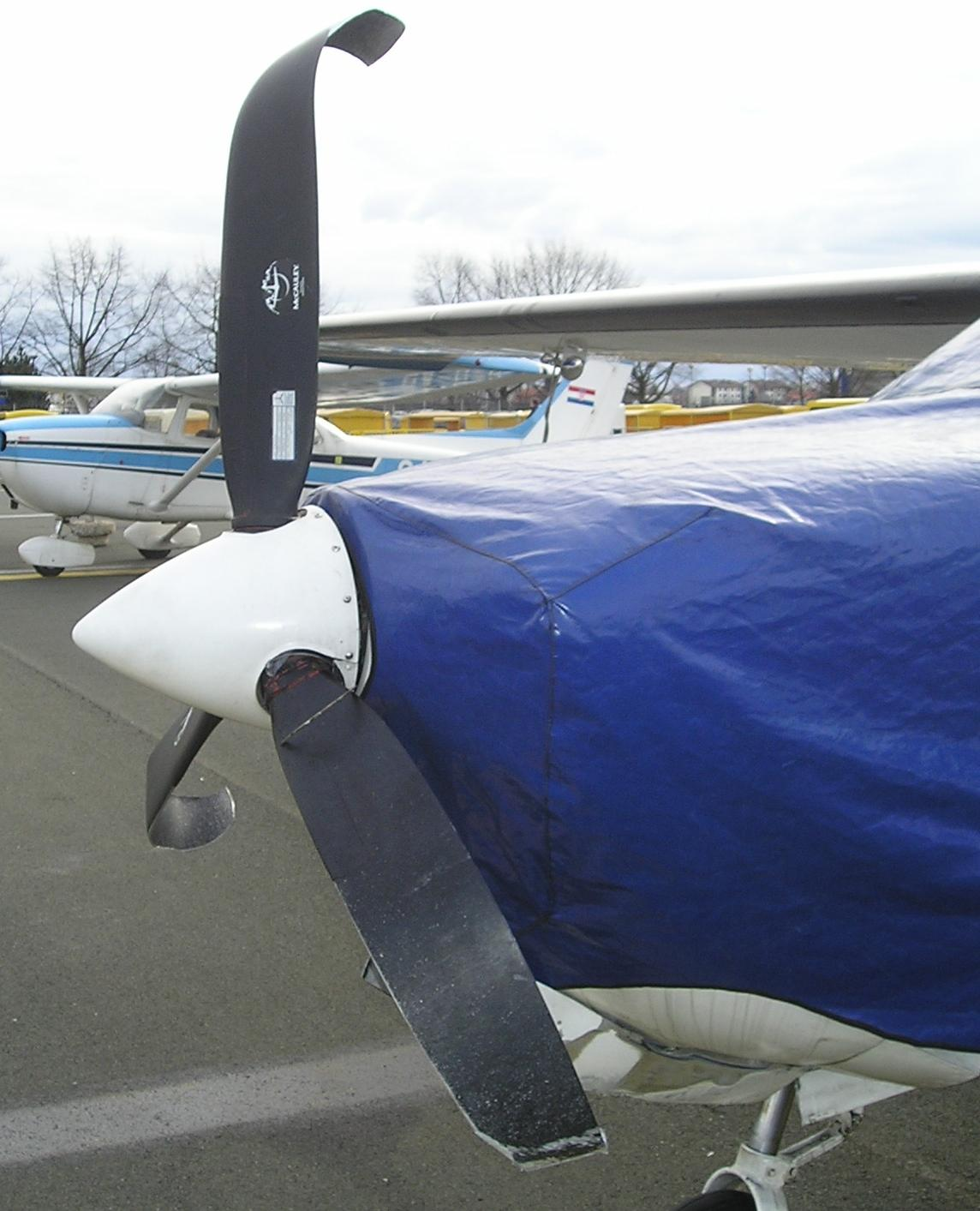
The result of a prop strike

In aviation, a propeller strike, or prop strike, also called a sudden stoppage, is an event in which an aircraft's propeller contacts any object and is forcibly stopped or slowed. Propeller strikes can be the result of the propeller contacting the ground due to landing gear collapse, failure to extend the landing gear, or nose-over. However, the term also includes the damage incurred from contacting any object, such as a hangar door or fuselage (such as the case in Reeve Aleutian Airways Flight 8), or even the sudden rpm loss from contacting a yielding substance such as water or heavy tall grass.

As well as damaging the propeller itself, a prop strike with the engine running can cause severe damage to the engine and its connected accessories, such as the alternator. An engine tear-down and rebuild is usually recommended, otherwise there is a risk of an in-flight engine failure, broken crankshaft or loss of propeller.

== See also ==
- Reeve Aleutian Airways Flight 8
- Bird strike
