= Reeve Aleutian Airways =

American airline, 1947–2000

IATA	ICAO	Call sign
RV	RVV	REEVE
- Founded: March 24, 1947; 79 years ago
- Ceased operations: December 5, 2000; 25 years ago
- Hubs: Anchorage International Airport
- Fleet size: 7 (in 1990)
- Destinations: Aleutian Islands, Seattle.
- Headquarters: Anchorage, Alaska, United States
- Key people: Robert C Reeve (founder & 1st President); Richard D Reeve (2nd President)
- Website: reeveair.com

Reeve Aleutian Airways was an airline headquartered in Anchorage, Alaska, United States. It ceased operations on December 5, 2000. Reeve Aleutian was named, possibly as a pun on the word revolution, by combining founder Robert C. Reeve's surname and the Aleutian Islands, its primary destination.

== History ==
=== Founding ===
In February 1946, Bob Reeve received a call informing him that some ex-USAAF C-47s and Douglas DC-3s were for sale (the C-47 being the military version of the DC-3). Reeve bought his first DC-3 for $20,000 with $3,000 down and the balance payable over 3 years. The cost of conversion to civilian standard was quoted at $50,000, but Reeve did the work himself at a cost of $5,000.

A strike by sailors on steamships operating between Seattle and Anchorage started on April 6, 1946. Reeve, along with Merritt Boyle and Bill Borland began flying between Seattle and Anchorage, with stops at Juneau, Yakutat or Annette Island. Each trip carried a full load of 21 passengers and took an average of 9 1/2 hours. In 53 days, 26 round trips were made. Reeve would work all night on inspections and maintenance of the plane at Spokane, and then fly back to Anchorage having had very little sleep. Reeve earned $93,000 from this activity, enough to pay for the DC-3 and buy three more.

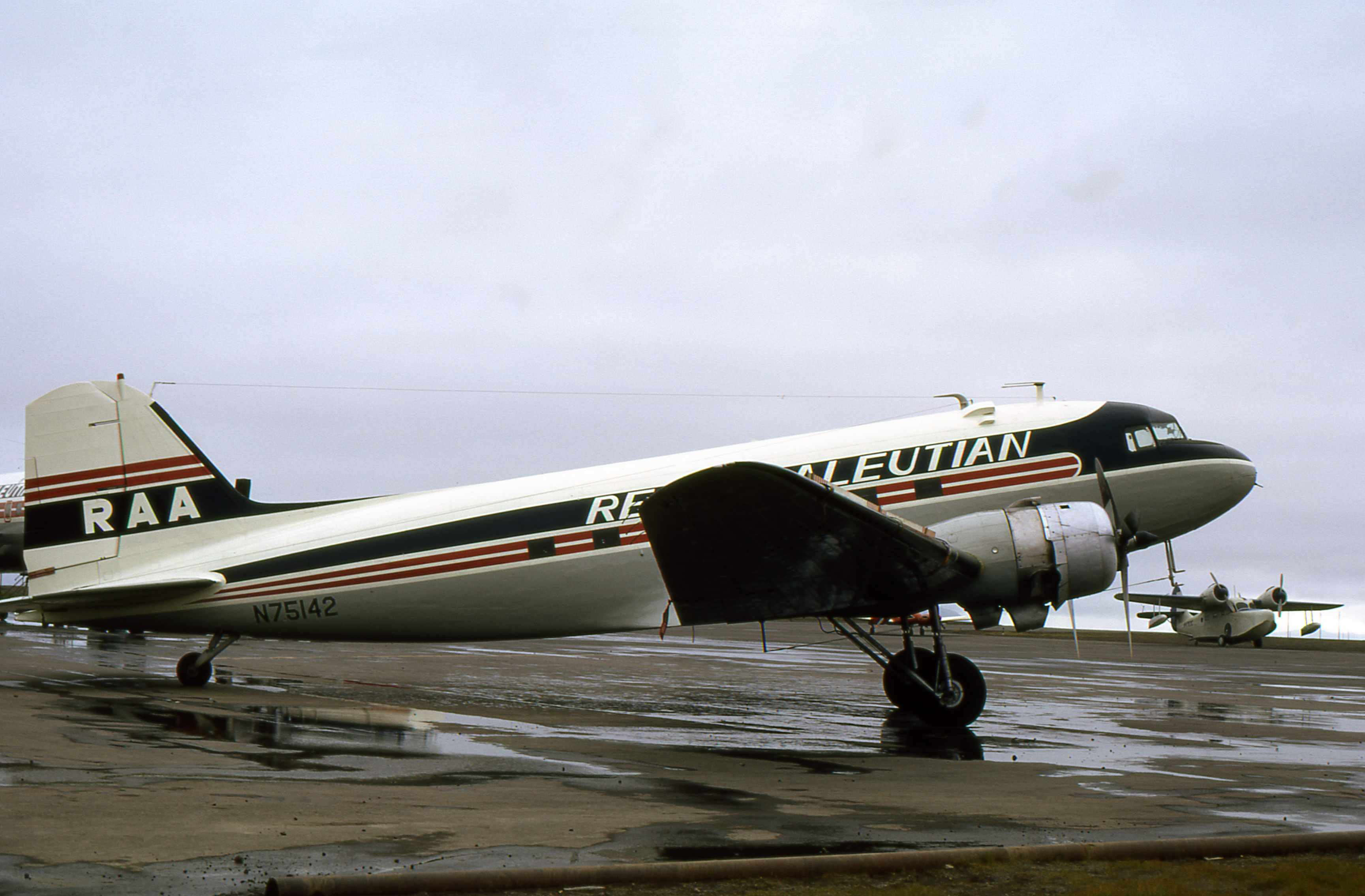
Reeve Aleutian Douglas DC-3 at Cold Bay

In July 1946, another DC-3 was purchased from the United States Air Force. In the winter of 1946–47, Reeve filed with the Civil Aeronautics Administration (CAA) for a license to operate on the 1,783 miles (2,869 km) run between Anchorage and Attu Island, and in the summer of 1947 he was making weekly flights down the chain. Within a year, he was running a twice-weekly service, keeping all four DC-3s busy. It was during this time that Reeve Aleutian suffered its first accident. DC-3 N46567 being damaged in an accident during take-off at Merrill Field. The aircraft was insured, and Reeve bought a twin-engine Beechcraft and a Lockheed Electra 10-B to replace the DC-3, which was subsequently repaired and eventually sold.

On March 24, 1947, Reeve Aleutian Airways was incorporated. The company was running scheduled and charter services all over Alaska, despite not having a formal CAA certificate. About this time, Reeve was ordered to get authorization to use the wartime Chain bases he was using. Reeve flew to Washington and leased Dutch Harbor field and acquired landing permits for Kodiak, Adak and Attu. Electra NC14994 was traded in during 1947, going to Continental Airlines.

In April 1948, Reeve Aleutian Airways was granted a temporary, five-year airline certificate. With the need to run the business on proper business lines (maintain an office, publish schedules and tariffs etc.), the Beechcraft and Electra were traded in for two Sikorsky S-43 amphibians. In October 1948, Port Heiden was de-activated, followed by Dutch Harbor, Attu and Umnak. Reeve took over Umnak and conceded Attu, which was not vital to his operations. About this time, the Naval Air Transport Service began selling tickets to Adak in competition with Reeve. Reeve went to Washington and met with Louis Johnson, who granted all the business in the area to Reeve. In 1948 another DC-3, a Sikorsky S-43 and a Grumman G-21 Goose were purchased.

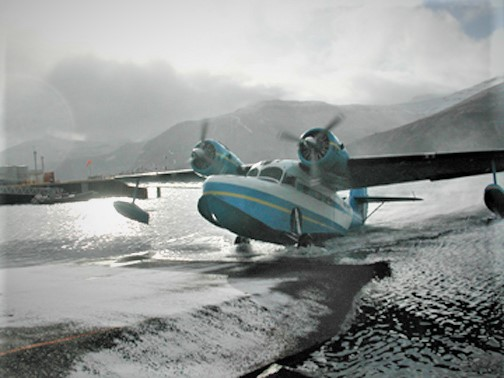
Grumman Goose of Pen-Air. Reeve sold two of these aircraft to Peninsula Airways (PenAir) in 1977.

In March 1949, four days' notice was given that Shemya was to close. This base was vital to Reeve, as it was an all-weather alternative to Adak, Amchitka and Attu. Northwest also needed the base on its run to the Orient. Reeve and Croil Hunter (President of Northwest) flew to Washington to plead their case without success, but on their way back to the hotel, Reeve met Major General Sam Anderson, who had served with Reeve's brother Richard, and explained their predicament with the result that the military were persuaded to pronounce the field "militarily desirable" and thus Shemya was saved.

A Sikorsky S-43 registered N15062 was purchased in March 1950. In late 1950, the bank was reluctant to loan Reeve any more capital. Reeve flew to Seattle in an effort to get a loan, but was turned down. He ran into Elmer Rasmusson, an Anchorage banker, whilst in Seattle, with the result that Rasmusson loaned him $125,000 to get going again. On the day he got the loan, Reeve heard that Pacific Airmotive, who were doing his maintenance, were going out of business in Alaska. Reeve flew back to Anchorage and bought the business, which was renamed Reeve Airmotive.

In 1952, the new Anchorage International Airport opened and all the other airlines moved there. The CAA was going to close Merrill Field, but it was retained for use by Reeve Aleutian and private operators. In 1953, final military deactivation of the Aleutian airfields occurred. Reeve obtained leases on Shemya and Cold Bay. Shemya closed in 1954 and all flights were switched to Cold Bay. In January 1957, A Douglas DC-3 registered N49363 was sold to Twentieth Century Aircraft. During the 1950s, St. George and Chernofski were served by airdrop, Reeve installing salvaged bomb releases in his DC-3s to enable this.

=== Expansion ===
By the mid-1950s, it was apparent that the DC-3s were not big enough for Reeve Aleutian. Therefore, the Douglas DC-4 was selected to supplement the DC-3s, eventually replacing them. Reeve's first DC-4 was purchased in March 1957 from Twentieth Century Airlines, which was going out of business. The first scheduled DC-4 flight was on March 12, 1957. The route was Anchorage-Kodiak-Cold Bay-Adak-Amchitka-Shemya-Attu. Umnak was served as required.

In 1957, the Distant Early Warning line was being constructed, bringing a boom to Reeve Aleutian. In 1957, an S-43 was traded in, two Curtiss C-46 Commandos were purchased from Cordova Airlines and Grumman G-21 Goose was leased from Interior Airways. Merrill Field proved too small for the DC-4, so Reeve Aleutian moved to Anchorage International in 1958. By the early 1960s, the DC-4 was proving outdated, and therefore a Douglas DC-6B was purchased in January 1962.

=== 1970s ===
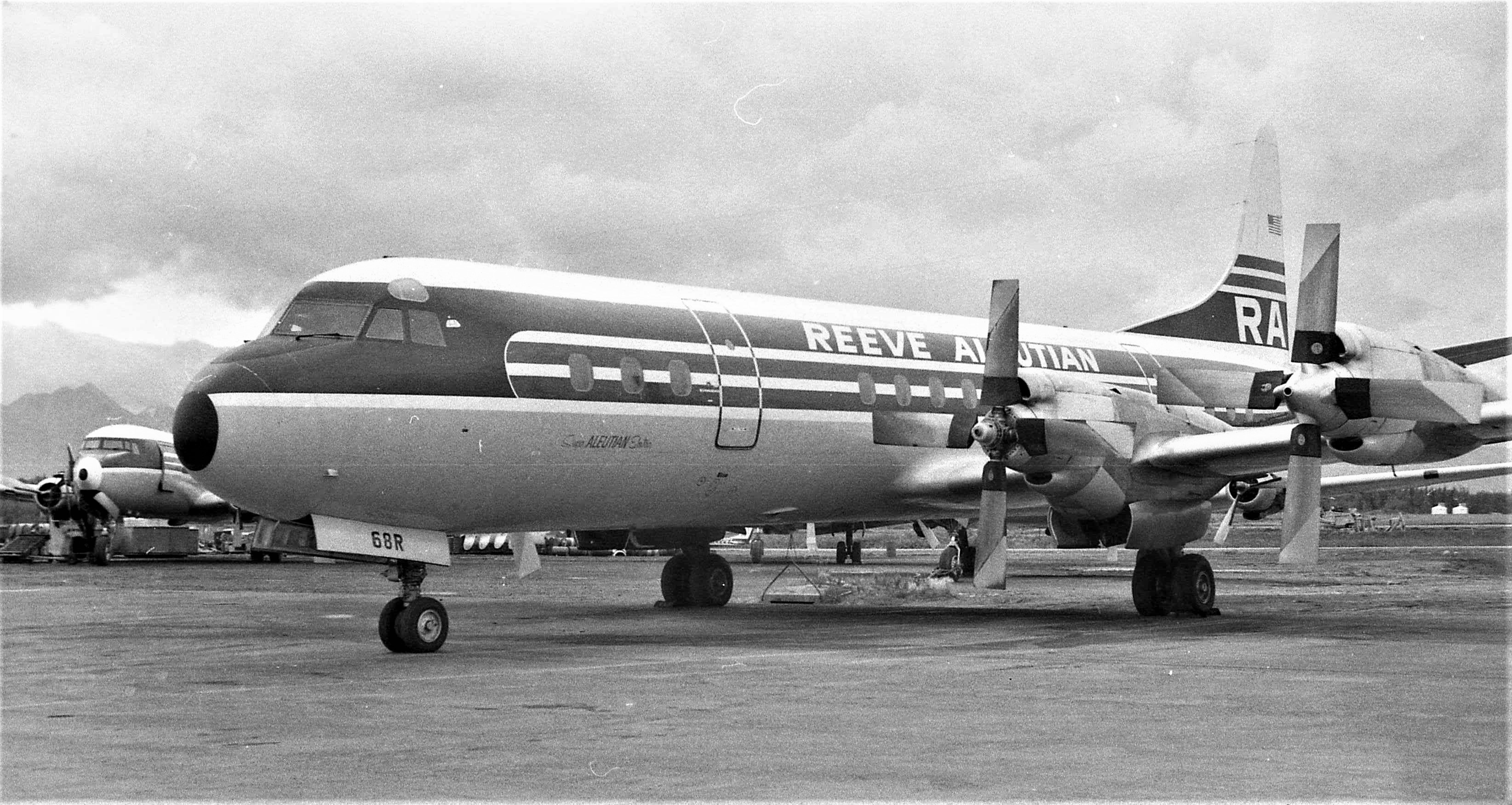
Reeve Aleutian L-188C Electra

The late 1960s saw the emergence of the Lockheed L-188 Electra turboprop airliner, which was to be backbone of Reeve Aleutian's business until Boeing 727-100 jets joined the fleet in later years. The first was purchased from California Airmotive in February 1968. With the acquisition of the Electras, the DC-6s were phased out of passenger service.

Reeve Aleutian still had DC-3s in service, and a replacement was sought. The NAMC YS-11A was decided on and the first aircraft was purchased new in 1972. In 1973, the Electra was certified by the CAA to land on gravel runways.

On November 11, 1974, there was a hangar fire at Anchorage, and one Electra aircraft and one YS-11A aircraft were destroyed. In April 1977 the two Gooses were sold to Peninsula Airways, and their service subcontracted for services out of Cold Bay.

In 1979, Reeve Aleutian initiated nonstop service between Cold Bay, Alaska and Seattle–Tacoma flying the Lockheed L-188 Electra. This service lasted for three and a half years. During that time, only nine out of 458 scheduled flights were cancelled, seven due to weather and two flights due to mechanical issues.

=== The jet age ===
In December 1983, Reeve Aleutian purchased two Boeing 727-22QC combi aircraft from Wien Air Alaska. During the Christmas 1985 holiday, there was a large backlog of mail at Seattle–Tacoma, and Reeve Aleutian contracted with the USPS to relieve the backlog.

The airline entered the 1990s on a relatively tight budget, with three aircraft mothballed and one leased out. In August 1999, Reeve Aleutian entered into a codeshare agreement with Alaska Airlines on the route between Seattle, Anchorage and Russian cities Petropavlovsk and Yuzhno-Sakhalinsk.

=== End of operations ===
Reeve Aleutian ceased operations on December 5, 2000, and about 250 people were laid off. Reasons given for the situation included increased competition and high fuel prices. At the end, only one Lockheed Electra propjet and one Boeing 727 jetliner were in service.

== Accidents ==
Several aircraft belonging to Reeve Aleutian were involved in accidents.

- late 1940s. Douglas DC-3 N46567 damaged in a take-off accident at Merrill Field, Anchorage.
- May 31, 1958. Curtiss C-46 Commando N1302N written off at Driftwood Bay, Alaska.
- September 24, 1959. Douglas DC-4 N63396 crashed on Great Sitkin Island, Alaska, 16 killed.
- May 29, 1965. Douglas DC-3 N91016 damaged beyond repair at Nikolski, Alaska.
- February 17, 1966. Curtiss C-46 Commando N10012 accident at Homer, Alaska, repaired and returned to service.
- February 10, 1971. Curtiss C-46 Commando N10012 written off at Nondalton, Alaska.
- June 22, 1972. Grumman G-21 Goose N1513V written off at False Pass, Alaska.
- November 6, 1974. Lockheed L-188 Electra N7140C destroyed by fire at Anchorage, Alaska.
- November 6, 1974. NAMC YS-11A N172RV destroyed by fire at Anchorage, Alaska.
- February 16, 1982. NAMC YS-11A N169RV accident at King Salmon, Alaska.
- June 8, 1983. Lockheed L-188 Electra N1968R, Reeve Aleutian Airways Flight 8 emergency landing at Anchorage, Alaska, after a propeller separation. Subsequently repaired and returned to service.

== Destinations ==
Reeve Aleutian Airways served the following destinations during its existence. * Denotes air drop only.

- Alaska
  Scheduled service
  Adak Is., Amchitka Is., Anchorage, Atka Is., Attu Is., Nikolski, Sand Point, Port Moller, Shemya Island, Cape Sarichef, King Cove, False Pass, Akutan Island, Chignik, Chignik Lagoon, Chignik Lake, Ivanof Bay, Sanak Island, Perryville, Chernofski*, Cold Bay, Dutch Harbor, King Salmon, Kodiak, Port Heiden, Shemya Is., St. George Is.,* St. Paul Is., Seattle/Tacoma International Airport (SEA), Umnak Is.,
  Charter service
  Aniak, Aufeis, Awuna, Barrow, Beluga, Bethel, Bettles, Big Delta, Big Mountain, Cape Lisburne, Cape Newenham, Cape Romanzof, Cape Sarichef, Cathedral River, Clear, Coldfoot, Collinsville, Colorado Creek, Colville River, Cordova, Crow Creek, David River, Deadhorse, Deitrich Pass, Delta Junction, Dillingham, Drift River, Driftwood Bay, East Teshekpuk Lake, Eight Mile Lake, Eielson AFB, Fairbanks, Farewell, Flat, Fort Greely, Fort Richardson, Fort Yukon, Franklin Bluffs, Franks Cabin, Galbraith Lake, Galena, Gamble, Glacier Bay (Gustavus), Granite Mountain, Granite Point, GP-1, Happy Valley, Helmrick Strip, Herendeen Bay, Homer, Ice Island, Icy Bay, Iliamna, Ikpikpuk, Iniskin Bay, Ivotuk, Jade Mountain (Kobuk), Juneau, Kalakatek Creek, Kalubik Creek, Kenai, Ketchikan, King Cove, Kotzebue, Kulik, Lake Louise, Lake Minchumina, Lonely, McCarthy, McGrath, Minchumina, Nenana, Nikolski, Nome, Nondalton, Northeast Cape, Northway, Nyac, Ophir, Oliktok, Painter Creek, Pilot Point, Platinum, Pontilia Lake, Poorman, Port Barrow, Port Clarence, Port Moller, Pribilof Islands, Prospect Creek, Prudhoe Bay, Purkeypile, Rainy Pass, Red Devil, Roberta's Lake, Ruby, Sagwon, Sand Point, Sandy River, Sarichef-Scotch Cape, Savoonga, Sennett Point, Sitka, Sitkinak Is., Skwentna, Stephan Lake, Sleetmute, Soldotna, Sparrevohn, St. Mary's, Talkeetna, Tanalian Point (Port Alsworth), Tanana, Tatalina, Tin City, Trinity, Tunalik, Tungak, Tyonek, Ugashik, Umiat, Unalakleet, Ungalik, Utopia Creek (Indian Mountain), Valdez, Wainwright, Walakpa, West Forlands, Wide Bay, Wind River, Yakataga, Yakutat, Yakutat Bay
- Continental US and Hawaii
  Everett, Honolulu, Houston, Portland, Seattle–Tacoma
- Canada
  Dawson, Edmonton, Fort St. John, Hay River, Inuvik, Peery Point, Norman Wells, Whitefish Lake, Whitehorse, Yellowknife, Vancouver
- USSR
  Petropavlovsk-Kamchatsky, Yuzhno-Sakhalinsk

== Fleet ==
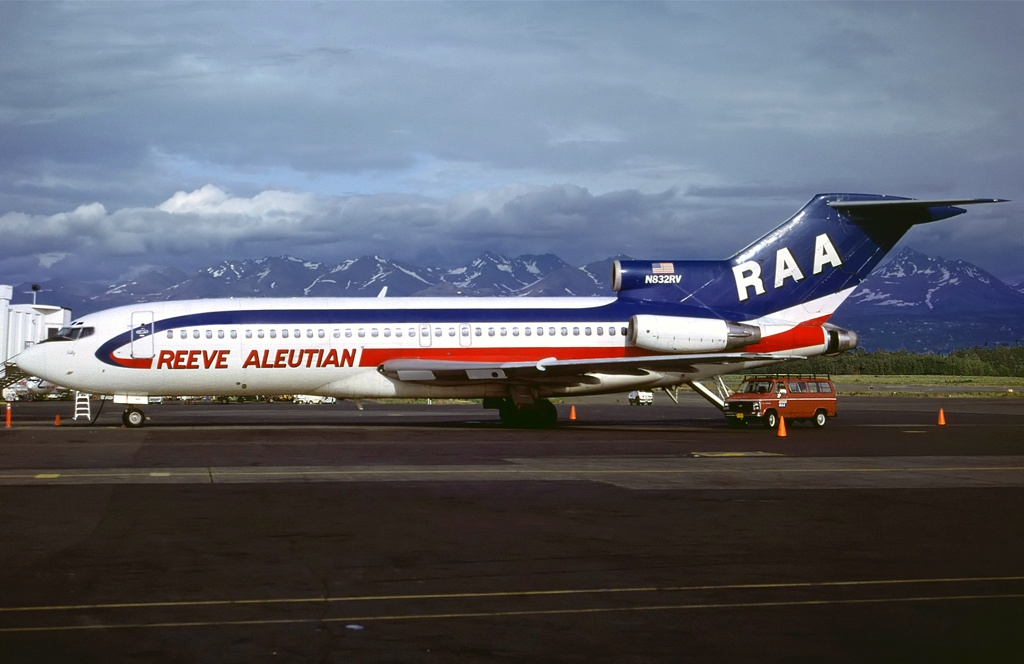
Reeve Aleutian Airways Boeing 727-22C

The following aircraft served with Reeve Aleutian.

- 1 – Beechcraft D-50 Twin Bonanza operated from 1959 to 1963.
- 2 – Boeing 727-100 quick change variants operated from 1983 to 2001. The B727 was capable of being operated in a mixed passenger/cargo configuration as a Combi aircraft and was the only jet aircraft type operated by Reeve Aleutian.
- 5 – Curtiss C-46 Commando operated from 1957 until the last one was sold in 1981.
- 7 – Douglas DC-3 operated or leased from 1946 until the last one was sold in 1975.
- 3 – Douglas DC-4 operated from 1957 until 1965.
- 1 – Douglas DC-6A operated between 1963 and 1980.
- 2 – Douglas DC-6B operated between 1962 and 1978.
- 3 – Grumman G-21 Goose (amphibian aircraft), one was destroyed and the other two were sold in 1977.
- 1 – Helio Courier H-250 purchased in May 1965 and then sold around in 1975.
- 1 – Lockheed Model 10 Electra operated and then sold in 1947.

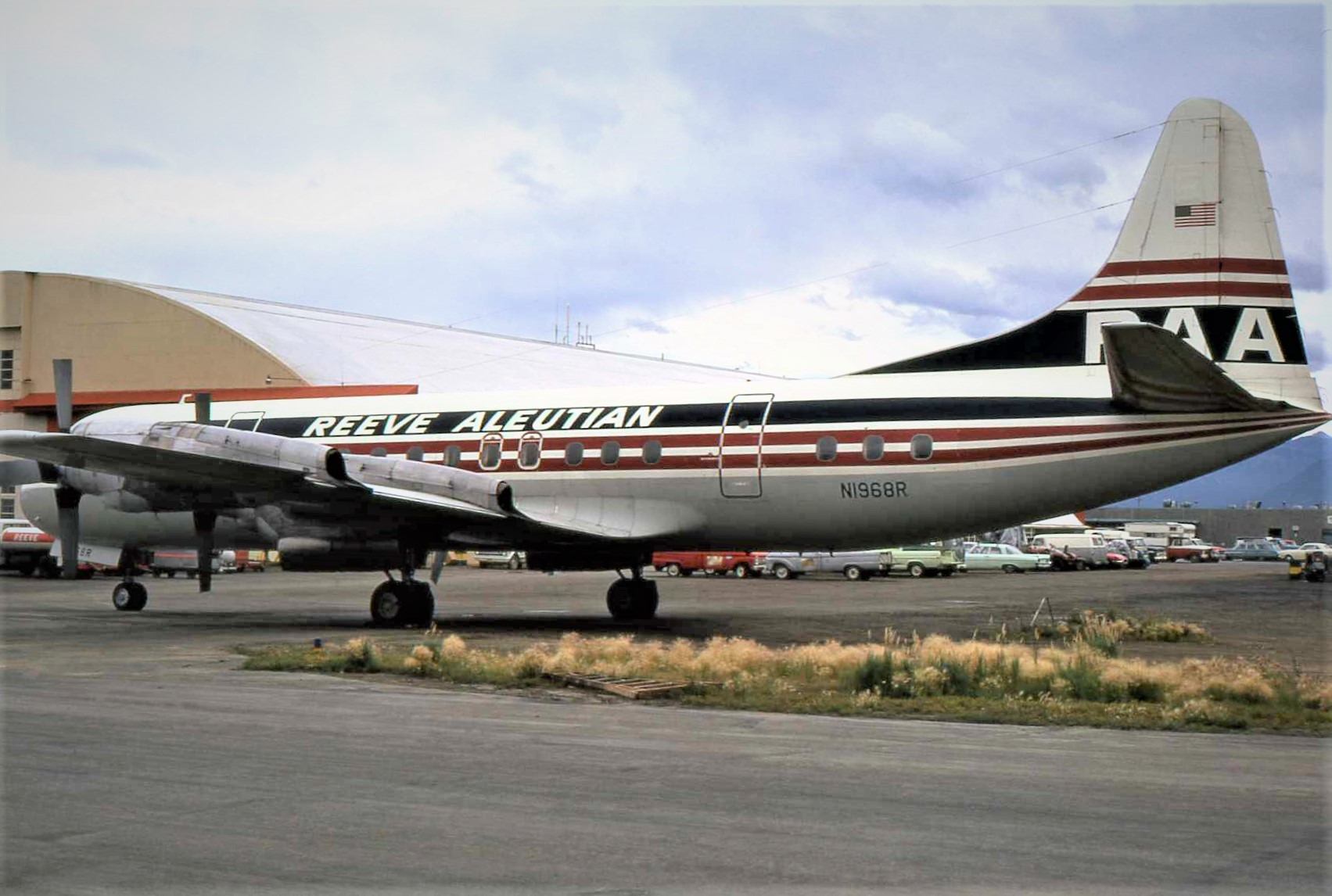
Reeve Aleutian Airways Lockheed L-188 Electra entered in service on 17 February 1968 and later was involved in the accident on Flight 8

- 6 – Lockheed L-188 Electra. First Electra purchased in 1968. One aircraft destroyed by fire with one aircraft still in service when the airline ceased operations. The four engine Electra turboprop was capable of being operated in a mixed passenger/cargo configuration as a Combi aircraft.
- 4 – NAMC YS-11A Japanese-manufactured twin turboprop operated with the first YS-11 purchased new in 1972. One aircraft destroyed by fire.
- 2 – Sikorsky S-43 (amphibian aircraft) operated with the first S-43 purchased in 1948. The S-43 was retired from service in 1957 with the sale of the last aircraft.
- 1 – Sikorsky S-39CS (amphibian aircraft) aircraft purchased in 1953.

== Livery ==
- Blue and Red tail, with the lettering RAA in white. Blue fuselage with red cheatlines, and the name "Reeve Aleutian" over the middle passenger windows, in white.

== See also ==
- List of defunct airlines of the United States

== Bibliography ==
- Cohen, S. (1988). Flying beats work-The story of Reeve Aleutian Airways. Missoula (Montana): Pictorial Histories Publishing Co.
