= Mount Lucania =

Mountain in Yukon Territory, Canada

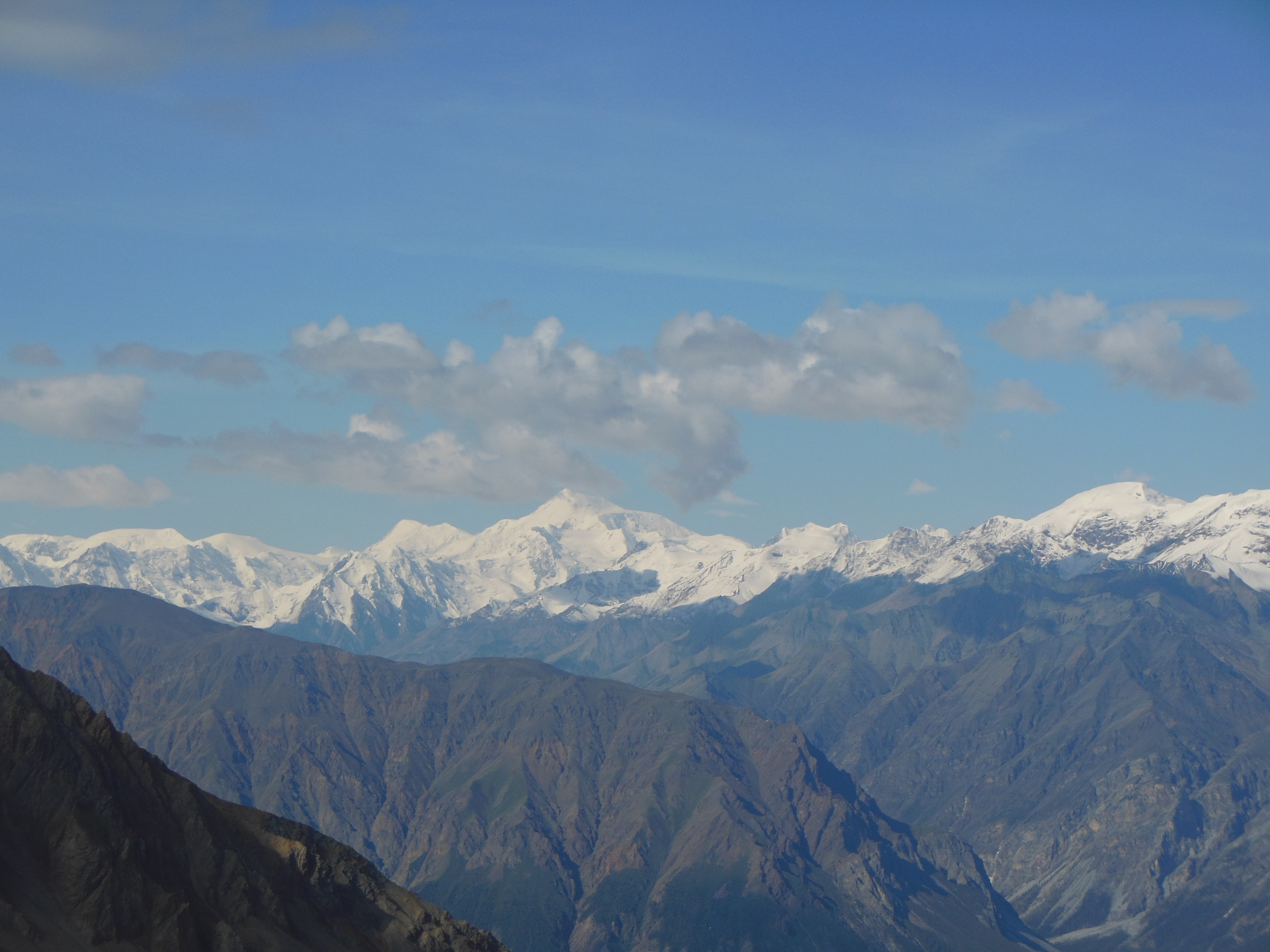
- Mount Steele (centre), with Mount Lucania just left of it and behind it

Highest point
- Elevation: 5,240 m (17,190 ft)
- Prominence: 3,053 m (10,016 ft)
- Parent peak: Mount Logan (5959 m)
- Isolation: 43 km (27 mi)
- Listing: World most prominent peaks 86th; North America highest peaks 7th; North America prominent peaks 15th; Canada highest major peaks 3rd
- Coordinates: 61°01′24″N 140°27′56″W

Geography
- Location within Yukon
- Interactive map of Mount Lucania
- Country: Canada
- Territory: Yukon
- Parent range: Saint Elias Mountains
- Topo map: NTS 115F1 Mount Steele

Climbing
- First ascent: 9 July 1937 by Bradford Washburn and Robert Hicks Bates
- Easiest route: Glacier, snow and ice climb

Mount Lucania is a mountain in the Yukon territory, Canada. At 5,240 metres (17,192 ft), it is the third-highest mountain in both Canada (Note: Second-highest mountain entirely within Canada, as Mount Saint Elias's summit is shared with the US state of Alaska.) and the Saint Elias Mountains. A long ridge connects Mount Lucania with Mount Steele (5,073 metres [16,644 feet]), the fifth-highest in Canada.

Lucania was named by the Duke of Abruzzi, as he stood on the summit of Mount Saint Elias on July 31, 1897, having just completed the first ascent. Seeing Lucania in the far distance, beyond Mount Logan, he immediately named it "after the ship on which the expedition had sailed from Liverpool to New York," the RMS Lucania.

== Climbing History ==
First Ascent

The first ascent of Mount Lucania was made in 1937 by Bradford Washburn and Robert Hicks Bates. They used an airplane to reach Walsh Glacier, 2,670 m (8,760 ft) above sea level; the use of air support for mountaineering was novel at the time. Washburn called upon Bob Reeve, a famous Alaskan bush pilot, who later replied by cable to Washburn, "Anywhere you'll ride, I'll fly". The ski-equipped Fairchild F-51 made several trips to the landing site on the glacier without event in May, but on landing with Washburn and Bates in June, the plane sank into unseasonal slush. Washburn, Bates and Reeve pressed hard for five days to get the airplane out and Reeve was eventually able to get the airplane airborne with all excess weight removed and with the assistance of a smooth icefall with a steep drop. Washburn and Bates continued on foot to make the first ascent of Lucania on July 8 and moved on to Mount Steele, completing the second ascent on July 11. In an epic descent and journey to civilization, they hiked over 150 miles (240 km) through the wilderness to safety in the small town of Burwash Landing in the Yukon.

Washburn's party was forced to abandon a great deal of gear—more than 1,000 pounds of cameras, surveying equipment and other supplies—on Walsh Glacier. In 2022, an expedition led by U.S. professional skier Griffin Post located Washburn's lost equipment, which had been carried 14 miles from its original location by the glacier. Assisted by officials from Canada's National Park Service and a team of archaeologists, much of the gear was collected and cleaned.

Subsequent Notable Ascents

The second ascent of Lucania was made in 1967 by Jerry Halpern, Mike Humphreys, Gary Lukis, and Gerry Roach.

Lucania was climbed via the southeast ridge, named Harmony Ridge, for the first time on May 5, 1977 by brothers Steven and Craig Gaskill. They returned to the summit on May 7 with Phil Raevsky and Mike Ruckhaus.

In April–May 2021, Pascale Marceau and Eva Capozzola summited the peak, the first all-woman team of climbers to do so.

== See also ==
- Mountain peaks of Canada

== Literature ==
- Roberts, David (2002). Escape from Lucania: An Epic Story of Survival. Simon & Schuster. ISBN 0-7432-2432-9.
