= Reeve Aleutian Airways Flight 8 =

1983 aviation accident over the Pacific Ocean

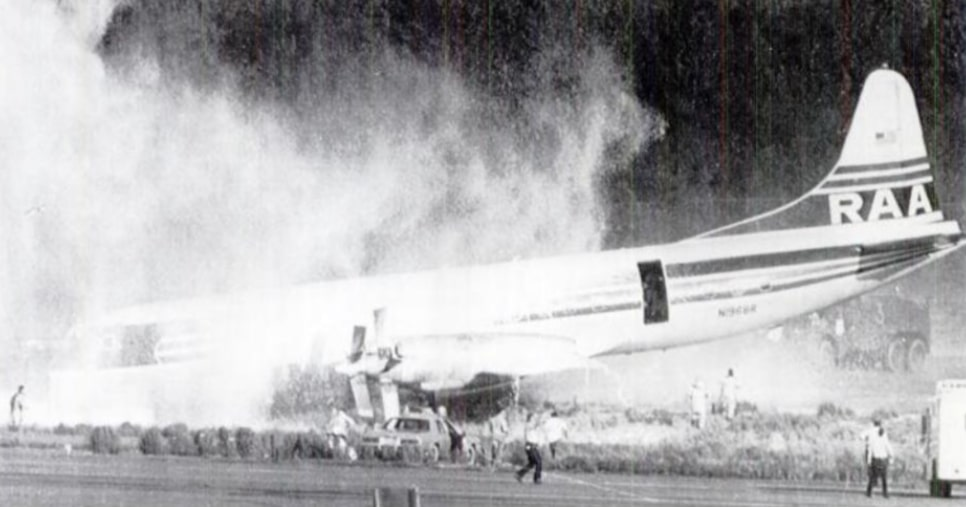
- The aircraft after making the emergency landing

Accident
- Date: June 8, 1983
- Summary: Propeller separation leading to rapid decompression, cause undetermined
- Site: Pacific Ocean near Cold Bay Airport, Cold Bay, Alaska, United States; 61.185°N 150.004°W

Aircraft
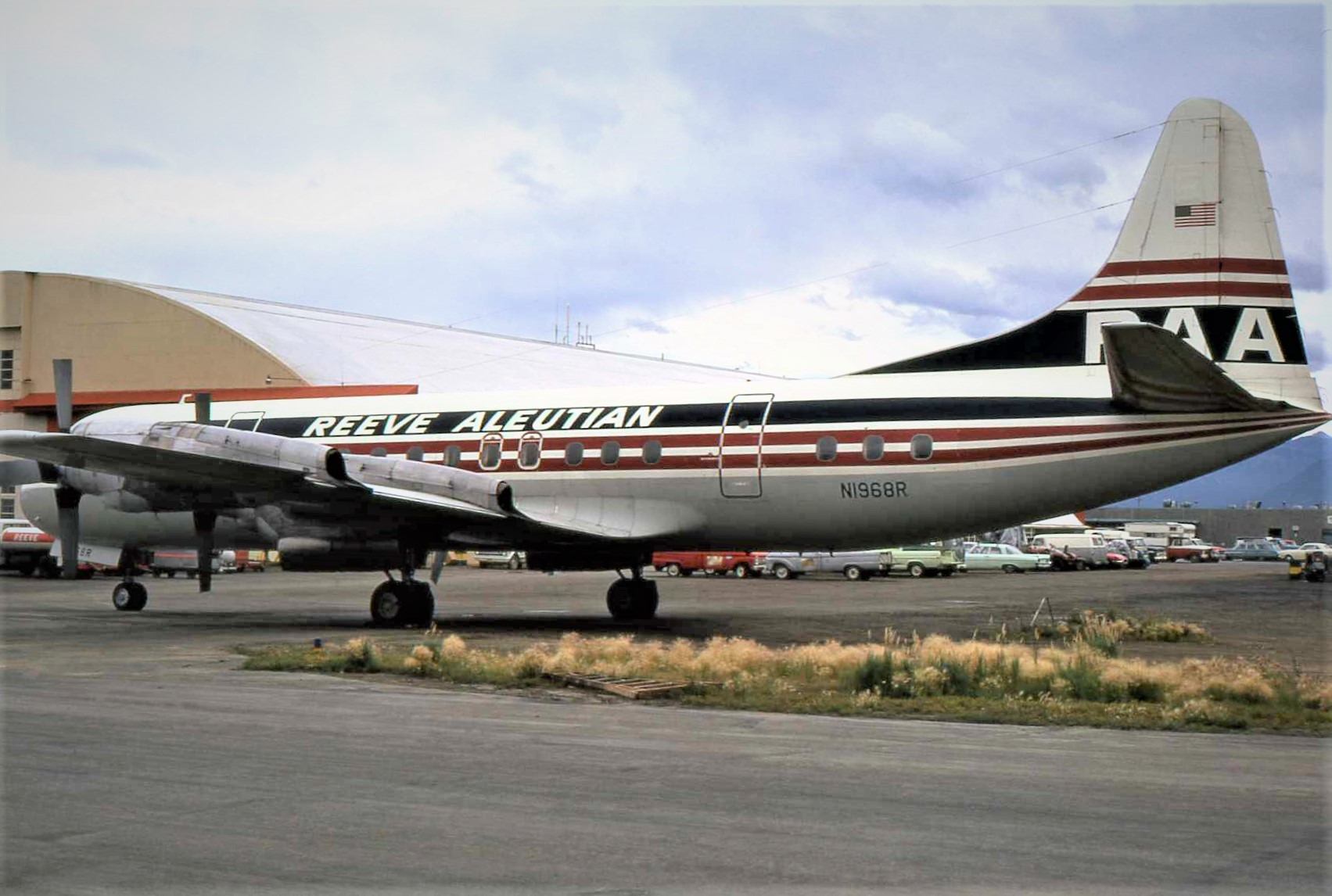
- N1968R, the aircraft involved in the accident, pictured in 1972
- Aircraft type: Lockheed L-188 Electra
- Operator: Reeve Aleutian Airways
- IATA flight No.: RV8
- ICAO flight No.: RVV8
- Call sign: REEVE 8
- Registration: N1968R
- Flight origin: Cold Bay Airport, Cold Bay, Alaska
- Destination: Seattle–Tacoma International Airport, SeaTac, Washington
- Occupants: 15
- Passengers: 10
- Crew: 5
- Fatalities: 0
- Survivors: 15

Reeve Aleutian Airways Flight 8 was an American domestic flight from Cold Bay, Alaska, to Seattle, Washington, on June 8, 1983. Shortly after takeoff, the Lockheed L-188 Electra of Reeve Aleutian Airways was travelling over the Pacific Ocean when one of the propellers broke away from its engine and struck the fuselage, damaging the flight controls. The pilots were able to make an emergency landing at Anchorage International Airport; none of the 15 passengers and crew on board were injured in the accident.

== Aircraft ==
The aircraft involved in the accident was a Lockheed L-188C Electra, powered by four turboprop engines, with manufacturer's serial number 2007 and registration N1968R. It had been delivered to Qantas in 1959. In 1968, after service with other airlines, including Air New Zealand and the California Airmotive Corporation, the aircraft was sold to Reeve Aleutian. It had flown approximately 33,000 hours in service at the time the accident happened.

== Flight ==
Just after takeoff from Cold Bay Airport, on the Alaska Peninsula for a flight across the northern Pacific Ocean to Seattle, Washington, with 10 passengers, the crew noted an unusual vibration in the aircraft, but was unable to isolate the source. As the aircraft climbed from FL190 (around 19,000 feet (5,800 m)) to FL250 (25,000 feet (7,600 m)), the flight engineer left the cockpit to visually check the engines from the passenger cabin, but saw nothing amiss. The flight attendant went into the cockpit to discuss the vibration, which suddenly increased in intensity as she went back into the cabin. She looked out the window and saw the propeller on the No. 4 engine (the outboard engine on the right wing) detach itself and fly spinning under the fuselage. The propeller tore a gash 8 feet (2.4 m) long in the aircraft's belly, depressurizing the cabin and jamming the flight and engine controls. The pilots managed to gain some control of the aircraft by using the autopilot and diverted the aircraft to Anchorage. With the engine throttle controls jammed at cruise power, on approach to land the crew was able to make the aircraft descend and climb after shutting down No. 2 (the left inboard) engine in combination with lowering and raising the landing gear.

External videos
- Landing footage on YouTube

The Electra landed safely at Anchorage International Airport, in spite of the loss of almost all flight controls. The crew had to shut down all engines once the aircraft was on the ground to help bring it to a stop; one tire blew out and the emergency brakes caught fire. Nobody was hurt when the propeller hit the fuselage or during the emergency landing, during which the plane veered off the runway and landed in a ditch. The captain, 54-year-old James Gibson, with 5,700 hours' experience flying Electras, was honored for the successful landing by a meeting with President Ronald Reagan in the White House. The Air Line Pilots Association also honored Captain Gibson, 39-year-old First Officer Gary Lintner, and 46-year-old Flight Engineer Gerald "Moose" Laurin later in 1983 with its Superior Airmanship Award.

The propeller fell into the Pacific Ocean and was never recovered for examination. The reason for its separation is unknown.

== Aftermath ==
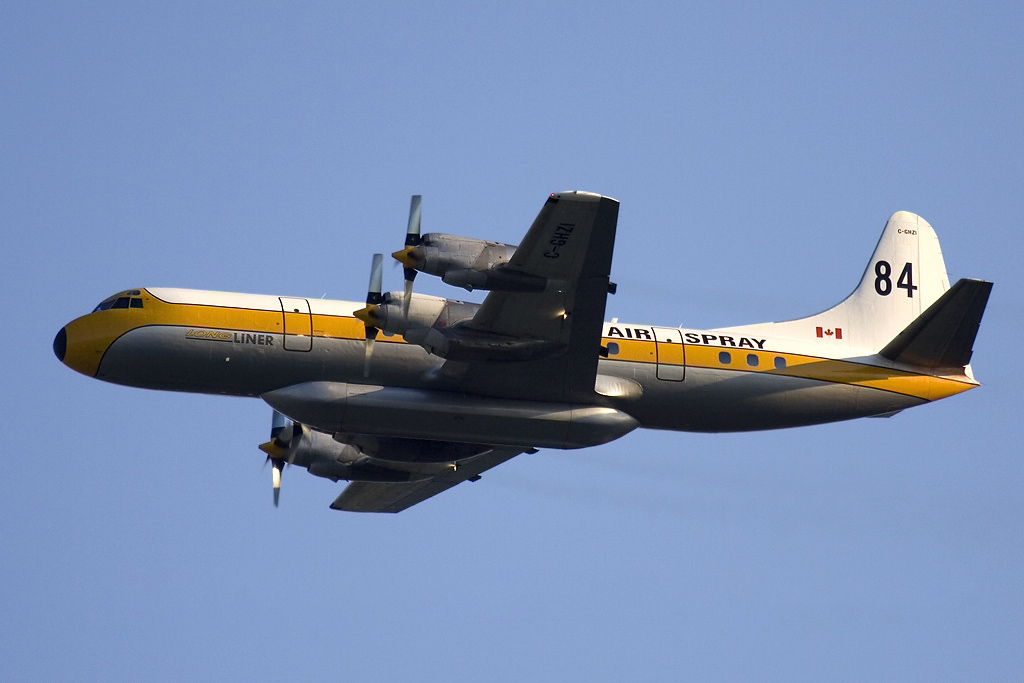
C-GHZI in 2007, operating as an air tanker for Air Spray.

Following the accident, the aircraft was repaired and returned to service. N1968R was unregistered in 2001 and was exported to Canada as C-GHZI, where it was used as a firefighting craft. It has continued in this role, as of August 2020, operating as Air Spray 484, dropping retardant on wildfires in Northern California. On 23 August 2020, while fighting fires 20 nautical miles to the north of Chico Airport, it was involved in a tree strike accident after it flew through smoke, sustaining minor damage in the process. The aircraft was ultimately able to complete the firefighting operation without further incident and was repaired. It returned to its base in Alberta, Canada, on August 28, 2020. Still as C-GHZI, the L-188 was airworthy and in service in June 2022.

The airline continued flight operations after the accident, but began to succumb to financial issues in the early 1990s. Reeve Aleutian Airways ceased operations on December 5, 2000.

Flight Engineer Gerald "Moose" Laurin died on February 5, 2009, at the age of 72; Captain James Gibson died on January 5, 2010, at the age of 80, and First Officer Gary Lintner died on January 9, 2020, at the age of 75.

== Dramatization ==
The events of Flight 8 were featured in season 12 of the TV series Mayday, in an episode named "Fight for Control".

This flight was also discussed in Episode 114 of the Rooster Teeth podcast Black Box Down.
