= Air Spray =

Canadian company specialized in wildfire suppression

Air Spray Ltd.

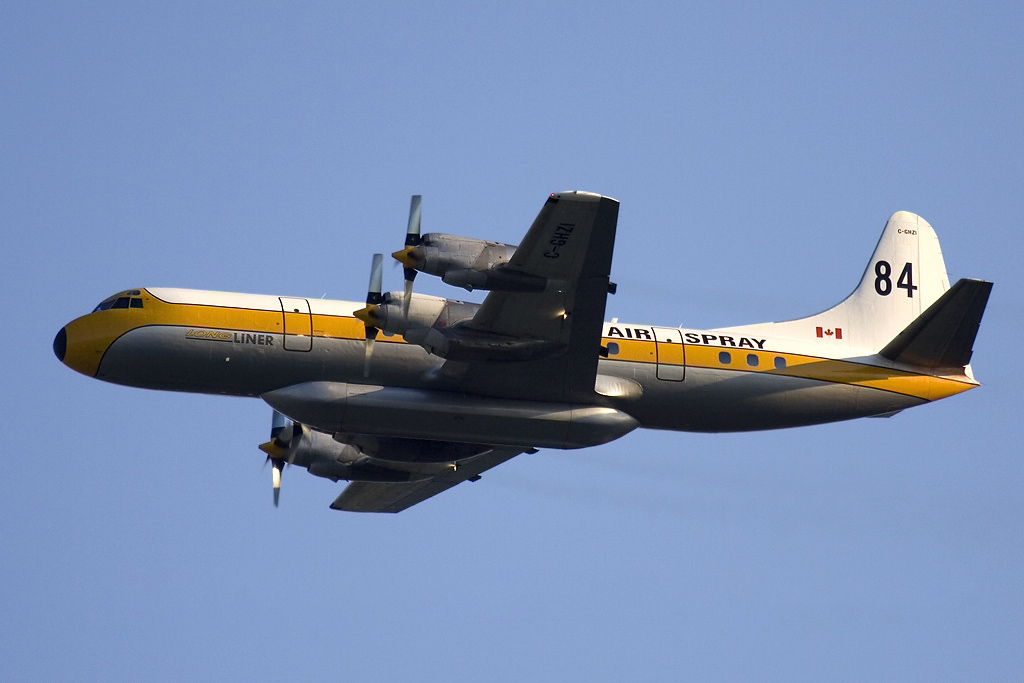
- Lockheed L-188C Electra, Tanker #84
IATA	ICAO	Call sign
N/A	ASB	AIR SPRAY
- Founded: 1967
- AOC #: Air Spray (1967) Ltd: 351; Air Spray USA Inc: 18594
- Hubs: Red Deer Regional Airport
- Secondary hubs: Chico Municipal Airport
- Fleet size: 51
- Parent company: Hamilton Investments Inc.
- Headquarters: Edmonton, Alberta, Canada
- Key people: Lynn Hamilton (President & CEO)
- Website: http://www.airspray.com/

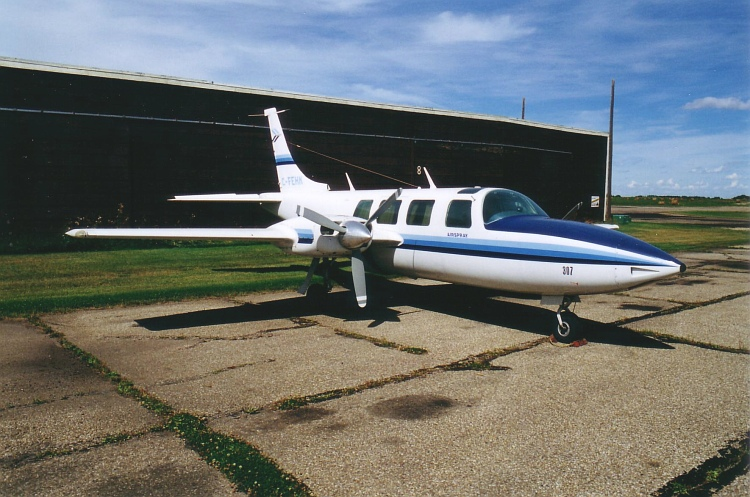
An Aerostar at Red Deer Regional Airport

Air Spray (1967) Ltd. trading as Air Spray Ltd. of Edmonton, Alberta, Canada and Air Spray USA Inc of Chico, California are private companies specializing in aerial wildfire suppression using air tanker or water bomber aircraft. Air Spray was owned and operated by Canada's Aviation Hall of Fame inductee, Donald T. Hamilton until his death in 2011. The company continued to be owned and operated by his daughter, Lynn Hamilton, of Foothills, Alberta.

== History ==
=== Foundation ===
Air Spray Ltd. was incorporated in 1954 by Dave Harrington as a crop spraying company in the Wetaskiwin, Alberta area. It later expanded into mosquito control with a contract awarded by the City of Edmonton in 1956. However, in the meantime, the aerial wildfire suppression industry was in its infancy with government agencies seeking a solution to the ever growing problem of controlling wildfires destroying timber and threatening communities. In response to this need, Air Spray Ltd. was one of a handful of companies in North America that shut down its crop spraying operations and converted its aircraft to fight wildfires.

With the conversion of two Stearman bi-plane aircraft to the air tanker role, Air Spray Ltd. was awarded the first ever aerial wildfire suppression contract issued by the Alberta Government. In June 1960, three Air Spray Stearmans flew to New Brunswick to spray for budworms and later in the season fought a large forest fire in British Columbia for the rest of the season.

In 1961 Air Spray Ltd. switched to the larger and faster TBM Avenger aircraft to provide Alberta with air tanker services. While the TBM Avenger was a relatively effective air tanker, the industry was looking to a next generation alternative in the form of a faster, medium-sized, twin engine aircraft. The Douglas A-26 or its variant, the B-26, was identified as the ideal aircraft to become an air tanker. Built in the United States between 1944 and 1945 and used extensively during the Korean war, its powerful twin Pratt & Whitney R2800 engines provided the aircraft with speed and the ability to carry a large payload of fire retardant. It also came equipped with a bomb bay ideal for the installation of a tank to hold the retardant. Several companies throughout North America saw the potential of the A-26 and the industry rapidly grew with dozens of A26s converted to air tankers during the 1960s and 1970s.

=== Reincorporation ===
In 1967 Air Spray Ltd. was reincorporated as Air Spray (1967) Ltd. and the company purchased one 1945 Douglas A-26 Invader for conversion to an air tanker. After conversion was complete, the company added a Cessna 310 to serve as a birddog aircraft (or lead plane) and Air Spray was awarded a contract for the group by the Province of Alberta. The company was later awarded a contract with the Yukon government for two more B-26s. In 1973 Air Spray's maintenance facilities were relocated from Edmonton, Alberta to the Red Deer Regional Airport at Springbrook, Alberta due to the availability of an aircraft hangar and to allow space for expansion. During the next few years, the company expanded, carrying out several seasonal contracts with various provincial governments. The fleet grew an average of one tanker per year, eventually including 22 B-26 air tankers (now retired) and 8 Cessna 310 bird dog aircraft operating under contract.

=== International expansion ===
Air Spray has focused on expansion outside of Canada. In 2012 Air Spray expanded its operation into the United States with the establishment of Air Spray USA Inc including an air tanker maintenance facility in Chico, California. As well, Air Spray has operated several aircraft in Coahuila Mexico to combat wildfires. In 2024, Air Spray sent 2 of its Electras to Bolivia to fight wildfires.

More recently, the company has purchased the BAe 146 passenger jet aircraft for conversion to an air tanker. Air Spray also added Air Tractor AT-802 "Fire Boss" Single Engine Air Tankers (SEATs) to its fleet in 2013.

In 2018, Air Spray Ltd. was awarded a contract for aerial firefighting by the Government of Manitoba. The Wildfire Suppression Services Contract was issued by the Manitoba Sustainable Development Agency and is for a period of 10 years. Air Spray is working in partnership with Babcock International to carry out the contract. The contract includes the management, maintenance and operation of Manitoba's fleet of seven Canadair water-bomber amphibious aircraft (four CL-415s and three CL-215s), supported by three Twin Commander “bird-dog” aircraft. Manitoba retains ownership of the water-bomber aircraft, parts, inventory, special tools and equipment but care and custody is transferred to the contractors.

== Company ==
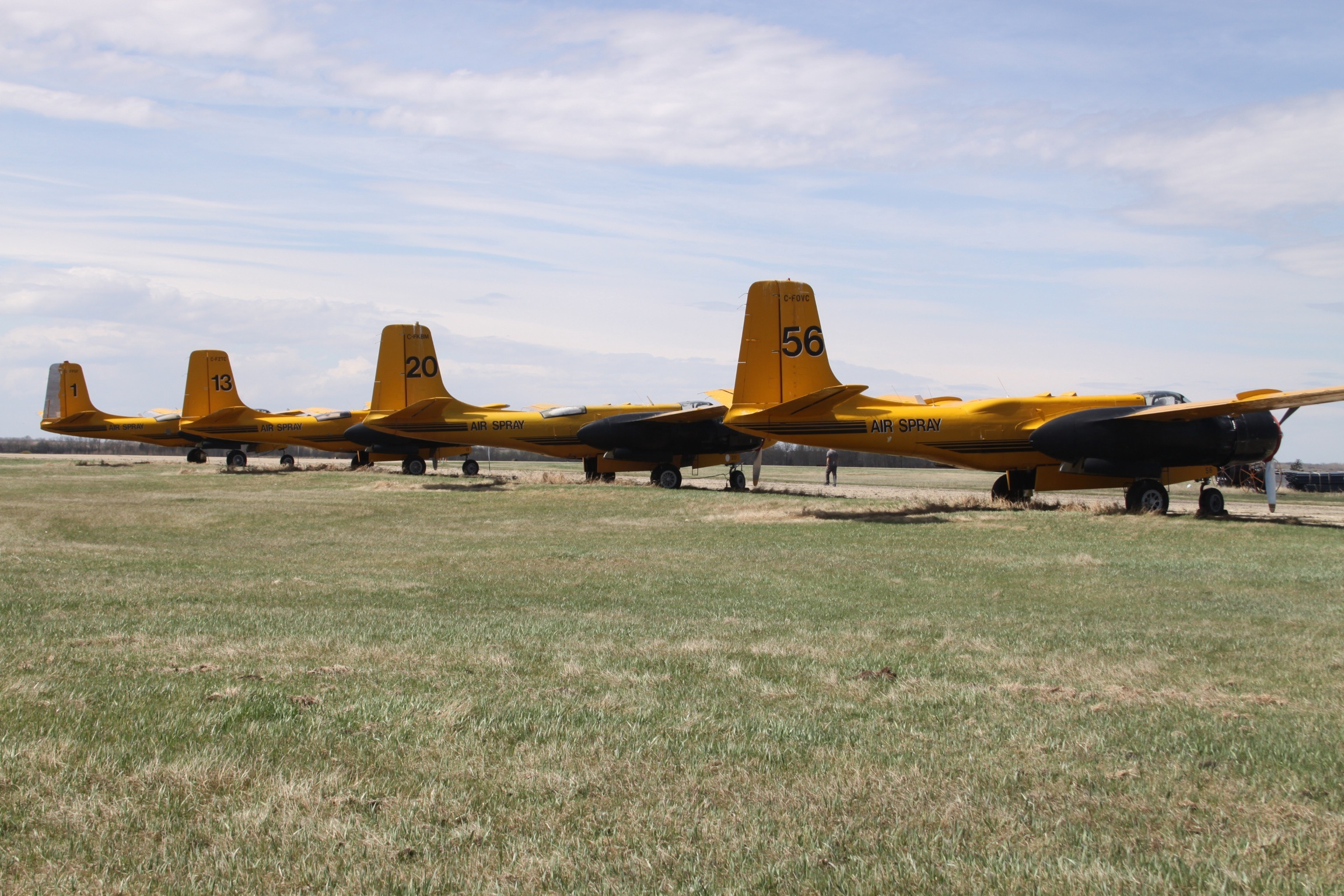
Douglas A-26 Invader

Air Spray has been involved in fighting many large wildfires including the 2003 Okanagan Mountain Park fire, the 2011 Slave Lake, Alberta wildfire and in 2016, the company was involved in fighting the Fort McMurray, Alberta wildfire. Air Spray is an Approved Maintenance Organization with Transport Canada and a Repair Station with the Federal Aviation Administration (FAA) and therefore during the summer months, when most firefighting aircraft are on location around the country, the Air Spray staff perform general aircraft maintenance and repairs. In Canada, Air Spray also carries out maintenance, repair and overhaul (MRO) of general aviation customer aircraft under the trade name of Springbrook Aerospace.

The company has developed a Transport Canada certified flight simulator for training pilots on the L-188 Electra and TC 690 aircraft.

=== Aircraft history ===
The WW2 era A-26 aircraft were converted to air tankers by fitting the old bomb bay with a 900 US gal (3,400 L; 750 imp gal) aluminium tank to hold the retardant or slurry, a mixture of clay, water and dye which is released over a fire. The A-26 flew over 30 seasons with Air Spray throughout Alberta, British Columbia, Saskatchewan, Yukon and the Northwest Territories. Flying at a speed of 210 knots (390 km/h; 240 mph), the A-26 was the work horse of Air Spray's air tanker fleet.

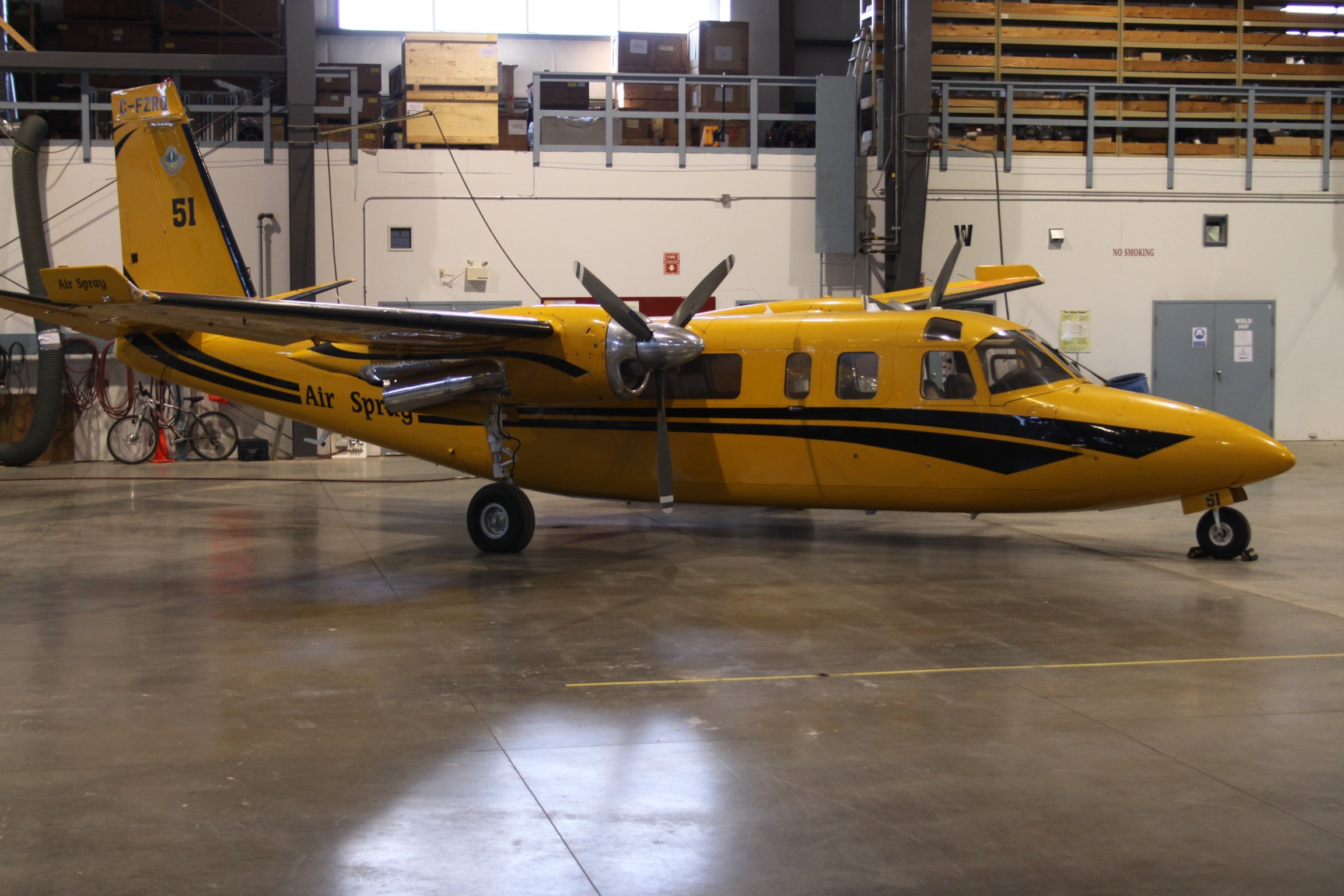
Turbo Commander 690

In 1986 Air Spray was awarded a contract by the Alberta Government for the operation and maintenance of four Canadair CL-215 air tankers. Air Spray operated and maintained the four aircraft for 17 years. In 1998, Air Spray purchased two CL215 aircraft, and was the first private owner and operator of this type of aircraft in the world. A third CL215 aircraft expanded the range of operation to include forest fire suppression missions in Yukon, Quebec, Ontario and British Columbia. In early 2009 the Air Spray CL215 aircraft were sold to Turkish Aeronautical Association.

In 1994, Air Spray added to its fleet the L-188 Electra, a fast, manoeuvrable turboprop plane which was converted to carry large loads of fire retardant (3,000 US gal (11,000 L; 2,500 imp gal)). The more powerful vehicle contributed to a better margin of safety for pilots. Air Spray used the Electra in British Columbia firefighting operations in 1994 and did so for Alberta a year later. The larger turbine aircraft eventually took over the work of the A-26 fleet which was retired at the end of the fire season in 2004. In 2013, Air Spray had the largest fleet of L-188 air tankers in the world.

Air Spray approached the former Aero Union in California to manufacture a tank for the L-188 Electra that would surpass the existing 12 door tank used by the industry on some air tanker aircraft at the time. After certification by Air Spray, the Retardant Aerial Delivery System (RADS) was installed on the L-188 Electra. This improved design consisted of two doors operated by an on-board computer to control the amount of the opening releasing the retardant at any one time, from a long straight line to a full drop of 3,000 US gal (11,000 L; 2,500 imp gal) of retardant, better meeting the individual demands of each fire situation. Air Spray is the current owner of the supplemental type certificate (STC) for the RADS tank for the Electra L-188 air tanker.

In addition to its fleet of air tankers, Air Spray has operated a number of "bird dog" aircraft in support of its air tanker activities. The crew aboard the bird dog includes a pilot and one or two air attack officers (AAO), who locate the fire, determine the optimal flight path for the following tanker, and recommend effective retardant dispersal patterns.

=== Current fleet ===
As of 30 March 2026, Transport Canada lists 51 aircraft registered to Air Spray. As of February 2016, the U.S. Federal Aviation Administration lists six AT802A Air Tractors to Wells Fargo Bank Northwest NA Trustee. (N349AS, N358AS, N376AS, N379AS, N397AS, N398AS)

First Air fleet
Aircraft	No. of aircraft	Variants	Notes
Aero Commander (Rockwell 690; Gulfstream Aerospace Turbo Commander)	16	6 - 690; 5 - 690A; 1 - 690B; 1 - 690C; 2 - 695A; 1 - 695B	Listed at the Air Spray web site as Twin Commander 690 and Commander 1000 Bird Dog
Aerostar	1	600	Not listed at Air Spray site
Bombardier CL-215 (Canadair CL-215)	11	4 - CL-215-6B11 (Series CL-415); 4 - CL-215-6B11 (Series CL-215T); 3 - CL215 1A10	Amphibious water bomber, not listed at Air Spray site
British Aerospace 146	2	BAe 146-200	Air tanker
Cessna 185 Skywagon	1	A185E	Not listed at Air Spray site
Cessna 310	2	1 - 310P; 1 - T310P	Bird dog, not listed at Air Spray site
Cessna 340	1	340A	A twin piston engine pressurized business aircraft, not listed at Air Spray site
Douglas A-26 Invader	3	A-26B	Former air tankers (retired in 2004) Slowly being sold off to collectors. Not listed at Air Spray site
Lockheed L-188 Electra	14	7 - L-188A; 7 - L-188C	Air tanker. C-GHZI was involved in the Reeve Aleutian Airways Flight 8 incident in 1983.
Total	51		

== Accidents and incidents ==
- June 30, 2000: An Air Spray Douglas B26C Invader (C-FEZX) air tanker was extensively damaged in a forced landing near the Grande Prairie Airport in Alberta. As the pilot made his approach to runway 25, he advised the air traffic controller that he had lost power in one of his engines. Moments later, he lost power in the second engine. After realizing he wasn't going to make the runway, he initiated a crash landing. The Invader came down in a field near the airport, bounced back into the air again, and then hit the ground and slid about 400 ft (120 m) before colliding with a road bank which spun the aircraft around and tore off the left engine. The pilot suffered minor injuries. It was later determined that the airplane had run out of fuel.
- May 25, 2001: An Air Spray Cessna T310Q (C-FGZR) was operating as a bird dog aircraft to support aerial firefighting on a forest fire northeast of Red Earth Creek, Alberta. During a turning manoeuvre at low altitude, the aircraft descended into the trees and crashed. The pilot and the fire control officer were fatally injured, and the aircraft was destroyed by subsequent fire.
- July 16, 2003: An Air Spray Lockheed L-188 Electra (Tanker #86 C-GFQA) crashed and was destroyed at Cranbrook British Columbia shortly after delivering the retardant load. Tanker 86 was seen to turn right initially, then entered a turn to the left. At 1123 local time (or 1923 Zulu), the Electra struck the terrain on the side of a steep ridge at about 3,900 ft (1,200 m) above sea level. The aircraft exploded on impact and the two pilots were fatally injured. An intense post-crash fire consumed much of the wreckage and started a forest fire at the crash site and the surrounding area.
- August 12, 2004: An Air Spray Douglas B26C Invader (C-FCBK) was on departure from High Level Airport, Alberta, to Rainbow Lake, Alberta, when the pilot rejected the takeoff run at approximately 90 knots (170 km/h; 100 mph) due to a power loss on one of the engines. The pilot released the load of fire retardant on the runway, however the aircraft was unable to stop in the remaining distance and came to rest in a drainage ditch approximately 1,200 ft (370 m) beyond the threshold of the runway, spilling a significant amount of fuel. The aircraft was substantially damaged, however there was no post impact fire. The pilot, who was the sole occupant sustained serious injuries.

== See also ==
- Cal Fire
- Conair
- Neptune Aviation
