= Burwash Landing =

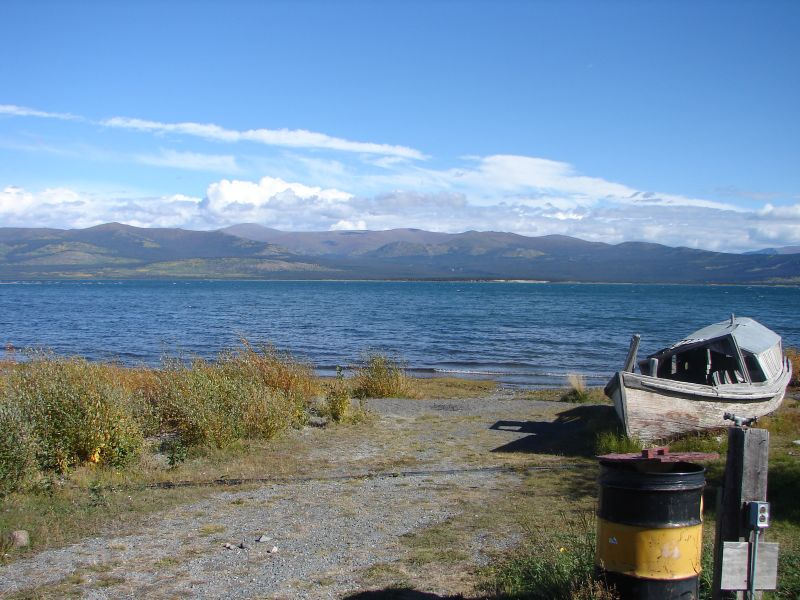

- Location within Yukon Location within Canada
- Coordinates: 61°21′11″N 138°59′12″W
- Country: Canada
- Territory: Yukon

Area
  - Land: 30.09 km^{2} (11.62 sq mi)
- Elevation: 806 m (2,645 ft)

Population (2016)
  - Total: 72
  - Density: 2.4/km^{2} (6.2/sq mi)
- Time zone: UTC−07:00 (MST)

Burwash Landing is a small community, at historical mile 1093 on the Alaska Highway, in Yukon, Canada along the southern shore of Kluane Lake.

The present location of Burwash Landing was first used as a summer camp by the Southern Tutchone Athabascans until a trading post was built in the early 1900s by the Jacquot brothers.

The majority of the population are Aboriginal peoples, First Nations. The community is the administrative centre of the Kluane First Nation. In addition to the Alaska Highway, the community is served by the Burwash Airport.

It is the home of the Kluane Museum of Natural History and the Kluane First Nation, and also home to the world's largest gold pan.

In July 1937, Robert Bates and Bradford Washburn, two members of the Harvard Mountaineering Club, made their way into Burwash Landing after climbing the 17,146 ft (5,226 m) Lucania peak and hiking over 150 mi (240 km) across the wilderness after their bush pilot was unable to retrieve them.

== Geography ==
Burwash Landing is 2,647 ft (807 m) above sea level at the airport. The elevation can be higher in some places and lower in the others. Burwash Landing is located on the Historic Milepost 1093 Alaska (Alcan) Highway. It sits on the northwest shore of Kluane Lake. Several prominent geographic features have been renamed in Southern Tutchone language.

=== Climate ===
Burwash Landing has a typical subarctic climate (Köppen climate classification Dfc), bordering on a dry-winter subarctic climate (Köppen climate classification Dwc). Burwash Landing holds the record for the warmest temperature ever recorded in the Yukon in January at 16.5 °C (61.7 °F), which was set on January 24, 2014. The previous Yukon record of 10.9 °C (51.6 °F), was set in Whitehorse on January 13, 2013.

Climate data for Burwash Airport Climate ID: 2100181; coordinates 61°22′14″N 139°02′24″W; elevation: 805.3 m (2,642 ft); WMO ID: 71001; 1991–2020 normals, extremes 1966–present
Month	Jan	Feb	Mar	Apr	May	Jun	Jul	Aug	Sep	Oct	Nov	Dec	Year
Record high humidex	16.1	11.1	13.5	18.7	28.6	31.1	34.3	31.2	24.6	21.0	10.0	11.6	34.3
Record high °C (°F)	16.5 (61.7)	12.0 (53.6)	13.9 (57.0)	20.3 (68.5)	29.7 (85.5)	31.7 (89.1)	30.0 (86.0)	30.5 (86.9)	25.5 (77.9)	21.0 (69.8)	14.0 (57.2)	14.0 (57.2)	31.7 (89.1)
Mean daily maximum °C (°F)	−14.5 (5.9)	−8.3 (17.1)	−2.8 (27.0)	6.3 (43.3)	13.5 (56.3)	18.4 (65.1)	19.6 (67.3)	17.7 (63.9)	11.7 (53.1)	2.7 (36.9)	−7.8 (18.0)	−12.9 (8.8)	3.6 (38.5)
Daily mean °C (°F)	−20.6 (−5.1)	−16.0 (3.2)	−11.2 (11.8)	−0.9 (30.4)	6.2 (43.2)	11.4 (52.5)	13.1 (55.6)	11.0 (51.8)	5.6 (42.1)	−2.8 (27.0)	−13.4 (7.9)	−18.8 (−1.8)	−3.0 (26.6)
Mean daily minimum °C (°F)	−26.7 (−16.1)	−23.5 (−10.3)	−19.6 (−3.3)	−8.0 (17.6)	−1.2 (29.8)	4.4 (39.9)	6.6 (43.9)	4.2 (39.6)	−0.6 (30.9)	−8.3 (17.1)	−19.0 (−2.2)	−24.7 (−12.5)	−9.7 (14.5)
Record low °C (°F)	−55.0 (−67.0)	−55.0 (−67.0)	−48.9 (−56.0)	−35.1 (−31.2)	−13.0 (8.6)	−5.5 (22.1)	−3.5 (25.7)	−8.5 (16.7)	−22.3 (−8.1)	−35.4 (−31.7)	−44.7 (−48.5)	−51.2 (−60.2)	−55.0 (−67.0)
Record low wind chill	−63.9	−59.9	−51.9	−38.0	−15.6	−6.6	−4.6	−10.2	−27.6	−44.0	−53.0	−61.0	−63.9
Average precipitation mm (inches)	8.4 (0.33)	5.6 (0.22)	6.6 (0.26)	5.5 (0.22)	21.7 (0.85)	46.8 (1.84)	73.7 (2.90)	37.6 (1.48)	21.6 (0.85)	14.7 (0.58)	12.9 (0.51)	9.9 (0.39)	264.9 (10.43)
Average rainfall mm (inches)	0.0 (0.0)	0.1 (0.00)	0.0 (0.0)	0.8 (0.03)	14.5 (0.57)	54.2 (2.13)	73.0 (2.87)	46.6 (1.83)	19.1 (0.75)	2.3 (0.09)	0.3 (0.01)	0.0 (0.0)	210.8 (8.30)
Average snowfall cm (inches)	12.6 (5.0)	10.6 (4.2)	10.0 (3.9)	7.6 (3.0)	8.0 (3.1)	0.7 (0.3)	0.0 (0.0)	0.0 (0.0)	6.4 (2.5)	17.8 (7.0)	18.5 (7.3)	15.2 (6.0)	107.6 (42.4)
Average precipitation days (≥ 0.2 mm)	7.6	6.8	5.5	3.6	8.3	10.9	14.4	11.0	9.4	9.7	9.8	7.5	104.4
Average rainy days (≥ 0.2 mm)	0.09	0.14	0.64	0.61	6.4	12.3	15.4	11.8	7.9	1.9	0.32	0.09	57.1
Average snowy days (≥ 0.2 cm)	8.0	6.3	6.0	3.7	3.1	0.27	0.0	0.04	2.5	8.1	10.3	8.2	56.6
Average relative humidity (%) (at 1500 LST)	73.9	66.1	52.0	43.2	39.8	43.6	51.4	51.8	52.3	63.8	76.2	75.6	57.5
Source: Environment Canada

== Demographics ==
Federal census population history of Burwash Landing
Year	Pop.	±%
1981	73	—
1986	64	−12.3%
1991	77	+20.3%
1996	58	−24.7%
2001	68	+17.2%
2006	73	+7.4%
2011	95	+30.1%
2016	72	−24.2%
2021	64	−11.1%
Source: Statistics Canada

In the 2021 Census of Population conducted by Statistics Canada, Burwash Landing had a population of 64 living in 44 of its 52 total private dwellings, a change of −11.1% from its 2016 population of 72. With a land area of 30.44 km^{2} (11.75 sq mi), it had a population density of 2.1/km^{2} (5.4/sq mi) in 2021.

== Southern Tutchone people ==
Burwash landing is the traditional home of the Southern Tutchone Athabascans. It used to be a summer camp. A revival of the Southern Tutchone language and culture has been taking place in this quiet lakeside community. This is readily apparent to visitors when they pull into town and are met with Southern Tutchone street and traffic signs, within and nearby Burwash Landing. Several prominent geographic features have been renamed in Southern Tutchone and signs can be seen along the Alaska (Alcan) Highway.

== Burls ==
Burwash Landing is known for its black spruce burls. Burls start as an irritation in the spruce. The tree sends extra sap as healant, which creates a growth (burl). Burls are either "green," harvested from live trees in the spring, or they are "dry burls," taken from dead burl trees. Burls are peeled off their bark and used in their natural form as fenceposts, for example, or they may be shaped and finished into a variety of objects, such as bowls. Check the Burlbilly Hill on the Milepost 1061.6, the visitor will see rows of "burly logs" on the hill.

== Gallery ==
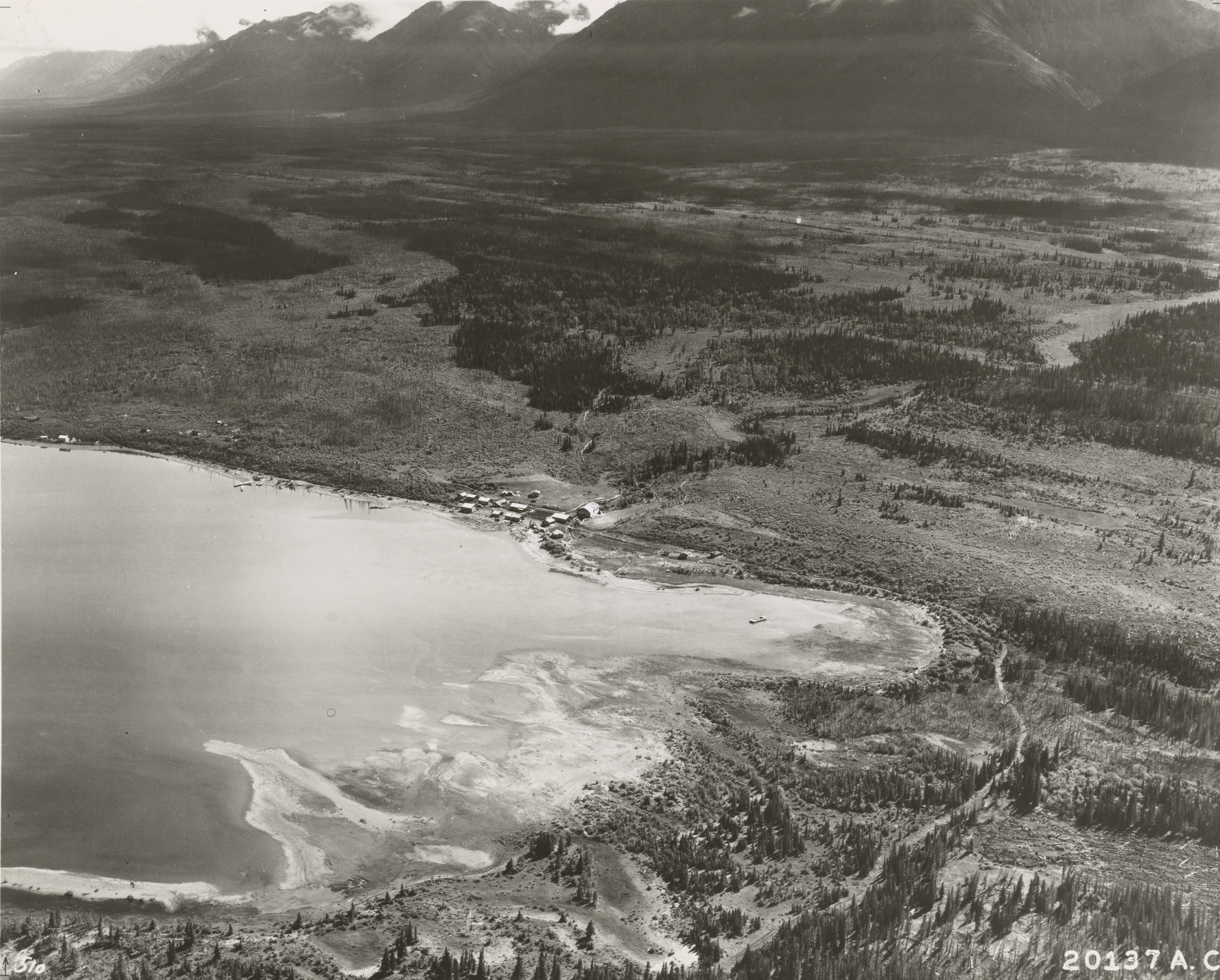

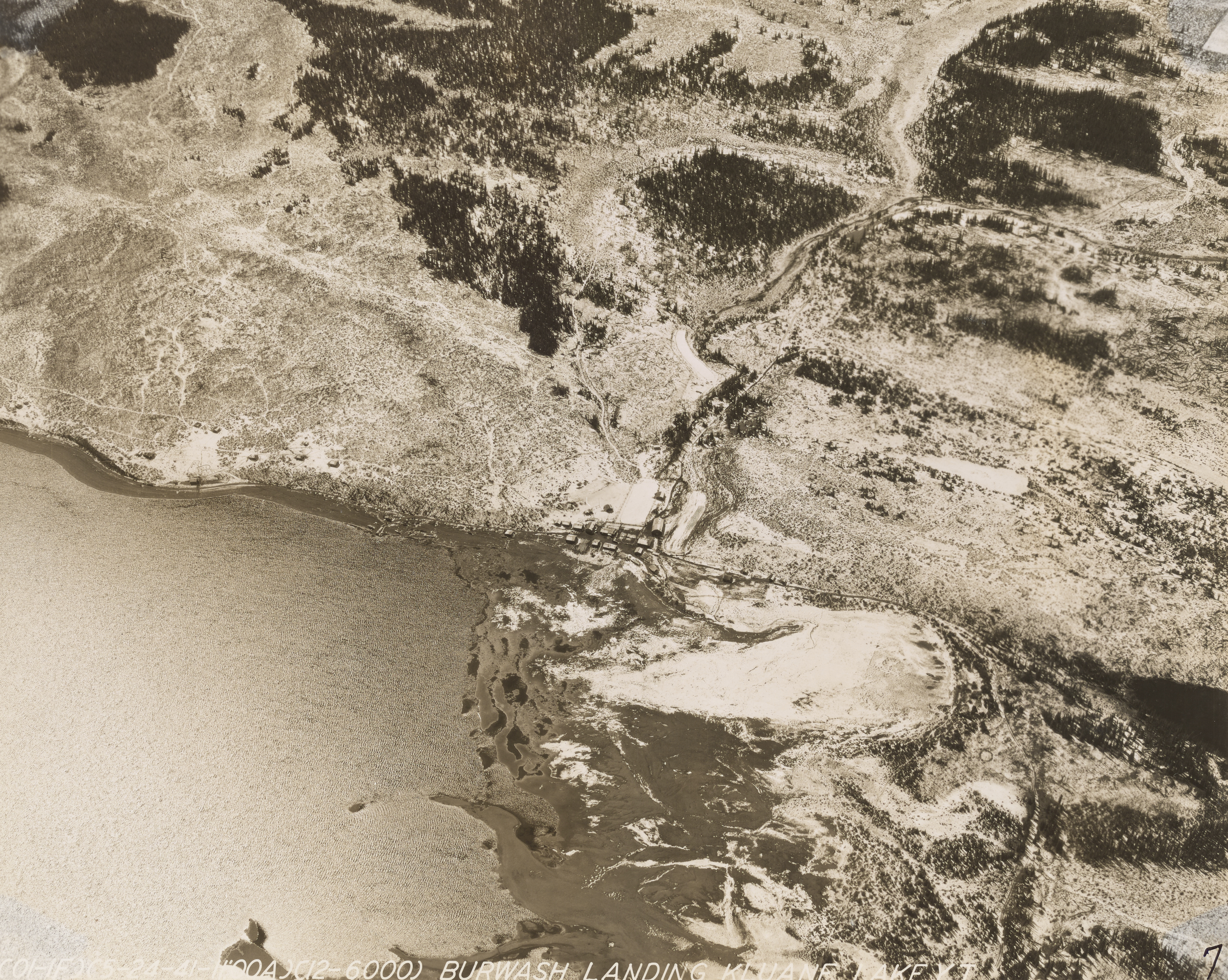

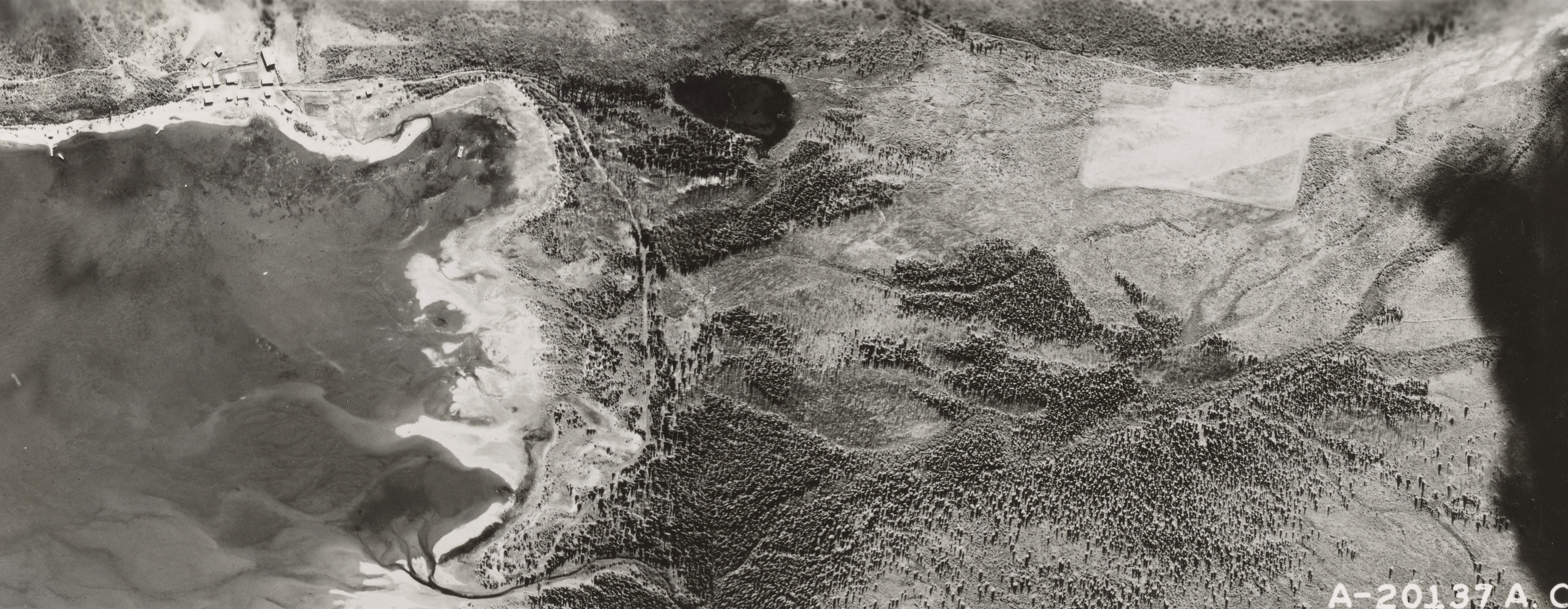
