= Mount Steele =

Mountain in Yukon, Canada

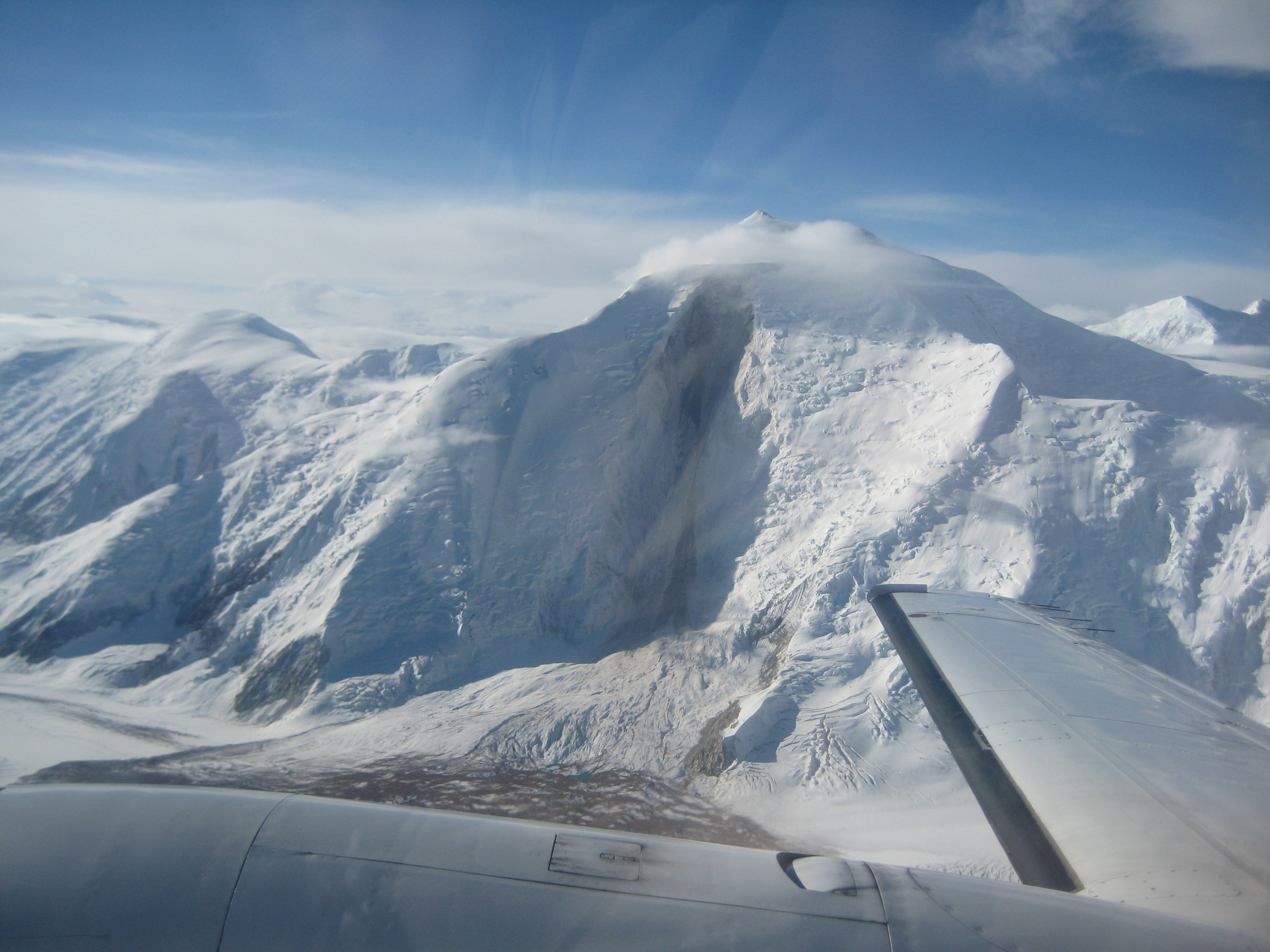

Highest point
- Elevation: 5,073 m (16,644 ft)
- Prominence: 813 m (2,667 ft)
- Parent peak: Mount Lucania
- Listing: North America highest peaks 11th; Canada highest major peaks 5th
- Coordinates: 61°05′36″N 140°18′39″W

Geography
- Location within Yukon
- Interactive map of Mount Steele
- Location: Yukon, Canada
- Parent range: Saint Elias Mountains
- Topo map: NTS 115F1 Mount Steele

Climbing
- First ascent: 1935 by Walter Wood & party
- Easiest route: glacier/snow/ice climb

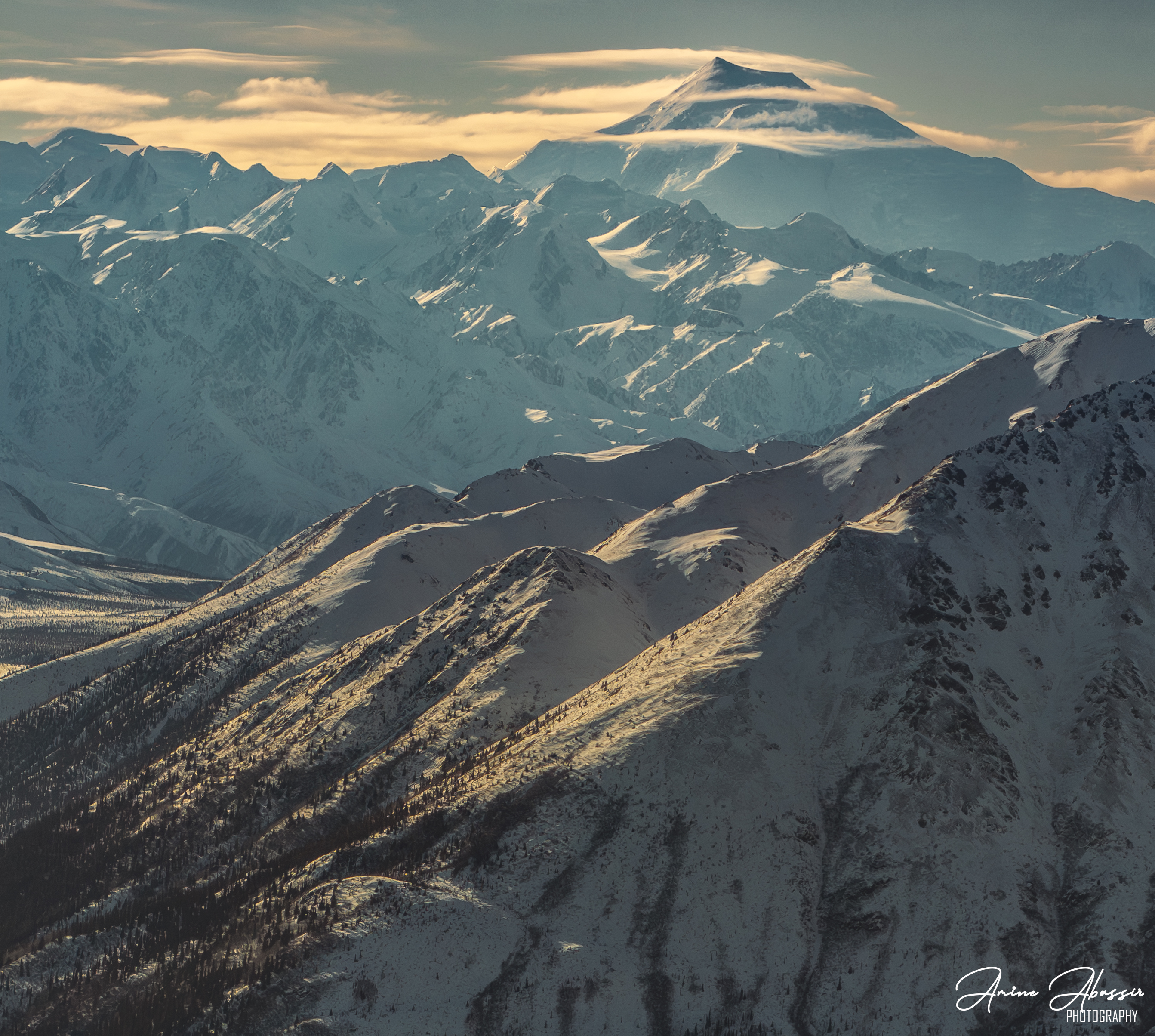
Mt Steele and the St Elias Mountains at sunrise

Mount Steele is the fifth-highest mountain in Canada and either the tenth- or eleventh-highest peak in North America. Its exact elevation is uncertain. Commonly-quoted figures are 5,073 metres (16,644 ft) and 5,020 metres (16,470 ft). A lower southeast peak of Mt. Steele stands at 4,300 m (14,100 ft).

It was named after Sir Sam Steele, the North-West Mounted Police officer in charge of the force in the Yukon during the Klondike Gold Rush.

== Elevation ==
Mount Steele's exact elevation is uncertain. Until the 1960s, Canadian topographical maps showed an elevation of 5,073 metres (16,644 ft), which was determined in 1913 by International Boundary Commission surveyors. However, this height was never tied to the sea-level datum established by the U.S. Coast and Geodetic Survey. More recent Canadian topographical maps no longer show a spot height, and their contour lines indicate a summit elevation of 5,020±20 metres (about 16,470±60 ft). The older figure continues to be quoted by other sources.

== First ascent in 1935 ==
Walter A. Wood led a team consisting of Foresta Wood (Walter's wife), Swiss guide Hans Fuhrer, Joseph W. Fobes, Harrison Wood and I. Pearce Hazard. The expedition approached the peak on the eastern side from Kluane Lake. Base camp was established at the foot of the Steele Glacier with horses carrying loads to Advance Base Camp (known as Camp 6) further along the glacier. ABC provided good views of the mountain and the team decided on the east ridge as their line of ascent.

After waiting for the weather to improve after heavy snowfalls, a four-man team consisting of Walter Wood, Harrison Wood, Fuhrer and Forbes left Camp 8 at the base of the ridge. Their plan was to make a 2,440-metre (8,010 ft) push to the summit. After steady upwards progress, deteriorating weather forced them to return to Camp 8 where they waited out a five-day storm which dumped over a metre of fresh snow. They started out again on August 15 and the ascent was made easier this time by windblown and hard steep snow slopes rather than steep soft snow on their earlier attempt. At 4,570 m (14,990 ft), a plateau of wretched snow forced the team to crawl on all fours. Walter Wood commented:

The humour of it impressed me. Here were four supposedly normal human beings crawling across a snow field 15,000 ft. up in the air, engaged in what they fondly believed to be a sporting venue.

Alternating the lead every 100 paces, they made their way from the plateau to the top, finally reaching the summit at 2:30 pm. The team enjoyed a blissful thirty minutes of windless conditions on top before beginning their descent.

== Avalanche and landslides ==
On 22 July 2007 at approximately 13:25 Pacific Daylight Time, a massive avalanche took place on Mount Steele when a slab of ice with a volume of about 3,000,000 cubic metres (3,900,000 cu yd) broke loose from its north face. The slab broke up as it fell down the side of the mountain, developing into an avalanche that crossed Steele Glacier, overtopped a 275-metre (902 ft) ridge, and continued onto Hodgson Glacier, where it finally came to rest after traveling a total horizontal distance of 8 kilometres (5.0 mi). The avalanche covered about 2 square kilometres (0.8 sq mi) of the surface of Steele Glacier. The avalanche registered as a 2.1-magnitude seismic event.

At 17:57 Pacific Daylight Time on 24 July 2007 – only two days after the avalanche — a massive landslide occurred on the north face of Mount Steele when a 400-metre-wide (1,312 ft) section of ice and rock fell. With a volume estimated at between 27,500,000 and 80,500,000 cubic metres (36,000,000 and 110,000,000 cu yd), it lasted about 100 seconds and reached a maximum speed of at least 252 kilometres per hour (157 mph). Falling 2,500 metres (8,202 ft) down the side of the mountain, the landslide traveled across the 1.5-kilometre-wide (0.9 mi) Steele Glacier, and reached the top of a 275-metre (902 ft) ridge on the opposite side of the glacier, where it came to a stop before sliding back down onto Steele Glacier. It traveled a total horizontal distance of 5.76 kilometres (3.58 mi). It was immediately recognized as one of the largest landslides in Yukon Territory history, if not the largest, and is one of the largest in the recorded history of western Canada.

On 11 October 2015, 45,000,000 metric tons (44,000,000 long tons; 50,000,000 short tons) of rock, snow, and ice with a volume of about 20,000,000 cubic metres (26,000,000 cu yd) slid 1 kilometre (0.6 mi) down the side of Mount Steele and 2 kilometres (1.2 mi) across the surface of Steele Glacier. It was one of the ten largest landslides of the year worldwide.

== See also ==
- List of mountain peaks of North America
  - Mountain peaks of Canada
