= Mount Bertha =

Mountain in Alaska, United States

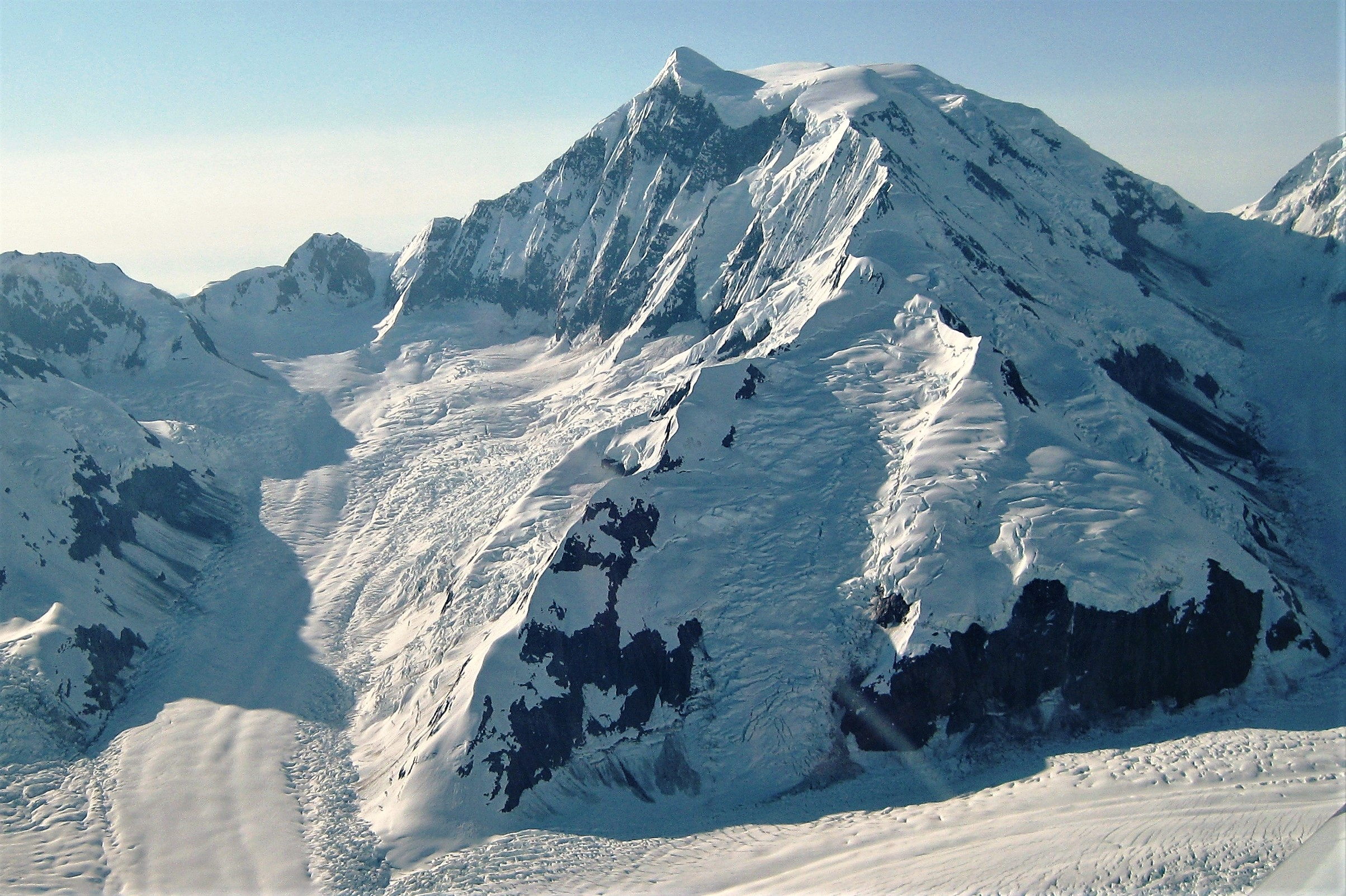
- Mt. Bertha, aerial view

Highest point
- Elevation: 10,204 ft (3,110 m)
- Prominence: 3,454 ft (1,053 m)
- Parent peak: Mount Crillon (12,726 ft)
- Isolation: 3.51 mi (5.65 km)
- Coordinates: 58°41′12″N 137°01′38″W

Geography
- Location within Alaska
- Interactive map of Mount Bertha
- Country: United States
- State: Alaska
- Census Area: Hoonah–Angoon
- Protected area: Glacier Bay National Park
- Parent range: Fairweather Range; Saint Elias Mountains
- Topo map: USGS Mount Fairweather C-4

Climbing
- First ascent: July 30, 1940 Bradford Washburn
- Easiest route: Mountaineering

Mount Bertha is a 10,204-foot (3,110-meter) glaciated mountain summit located in the Fairweather Range of the Saint Elias Mountains, in southeast Alaska, United States.

== Geography and naming ==
The peak is situated in Glacier Bay National Park, 5.5 mi (9 km) east-northeast of Mount Crillon which is the nearest higher peak, and 23.5 mi (38 km) southeast of Mount Fairweather, which is the highest peak in the Fairweather Range. The mountain's name first appeared in 1910 when published by the United States Coast and Geodetic Survey. The United States Geological Survey claims it was named after SS Bertha, an Alaska Commercial Company steamer in service from 1888 until it wrecked at Uyak Bay on July 18, 1915. However, according to Bradford Washburn of the Boston Museum of Science and American Mountaineering Museum, this feature was named for a prostitute in Skagway, Alaska, known by members of the International Boundary Commission who surveyed the area.

== Climbing history ==
The first ascent of the peak was made July 30, 1940, by Bradford Washburn, his wife Barbara Washburn, Maynard Miller, Michl Feuersinger, and Thomas Winship. It was the first mountain climbing experience for Barbara, and Bradford would later refer to the expedition as their honeymoon since they had recently married in April. After the expedition she would learn that she was several months pregnant. In 1947 she became the first woman to summit Denali. The months May through June offer the most favorable weather for climbing and viewing.

== Climate ==
Based on the Köppen climate classification, Mount Bertha has a subarctic climate with cold, snowy winters, and mild summers. Weather systems coming off the Gulf of Alaska are forced upwards by the Fairweather Range (orographic lift), causing heavy precipitation in the form of rainfall and snowfall. Winter temperatures can drop below −20 °C with wind chill factors below −30 °C. This climate supports hanging glaciers on its slopes as well as the immense Brady Glacier to the south, Reid Glacier to the northeast, and Johns Hopkins Glacier to the northwest. Precipitation runoff and meltwater from its glaciers drains into Glacier Bay and the Gulf of Alaska.

== Gallery ==
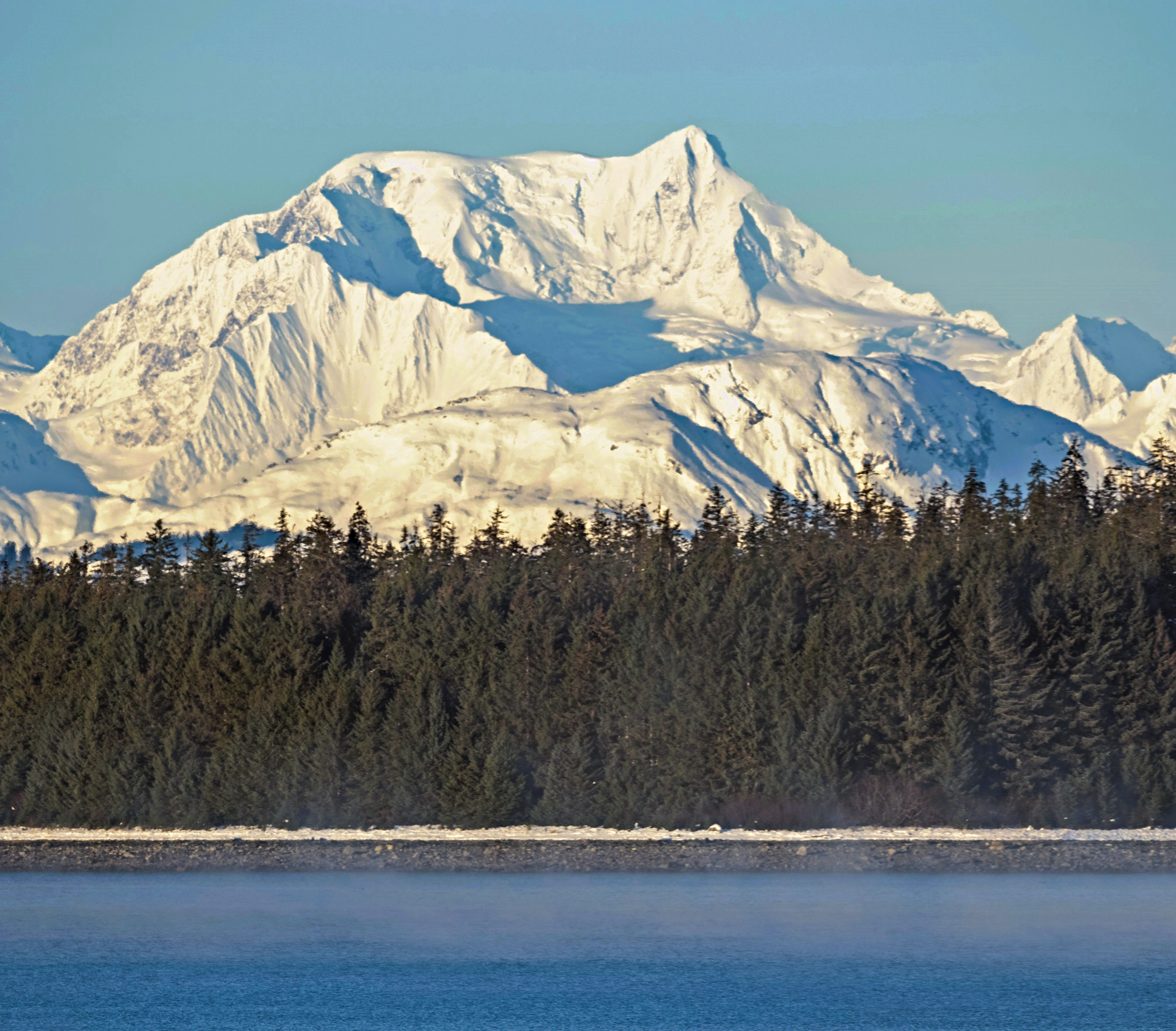

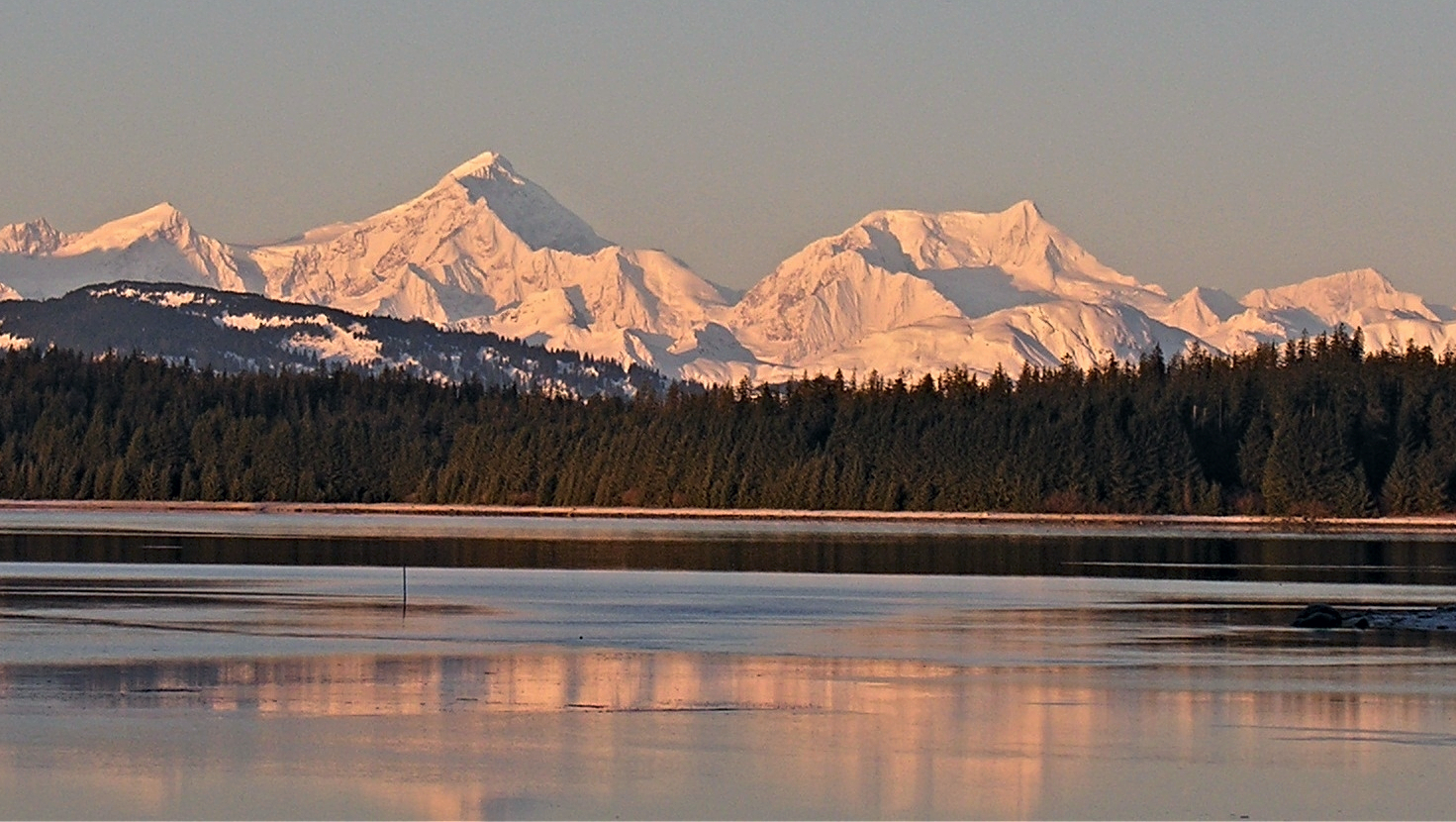
Mt. Crillon (left) and Mt. Bertha (right) seen from park headquarters

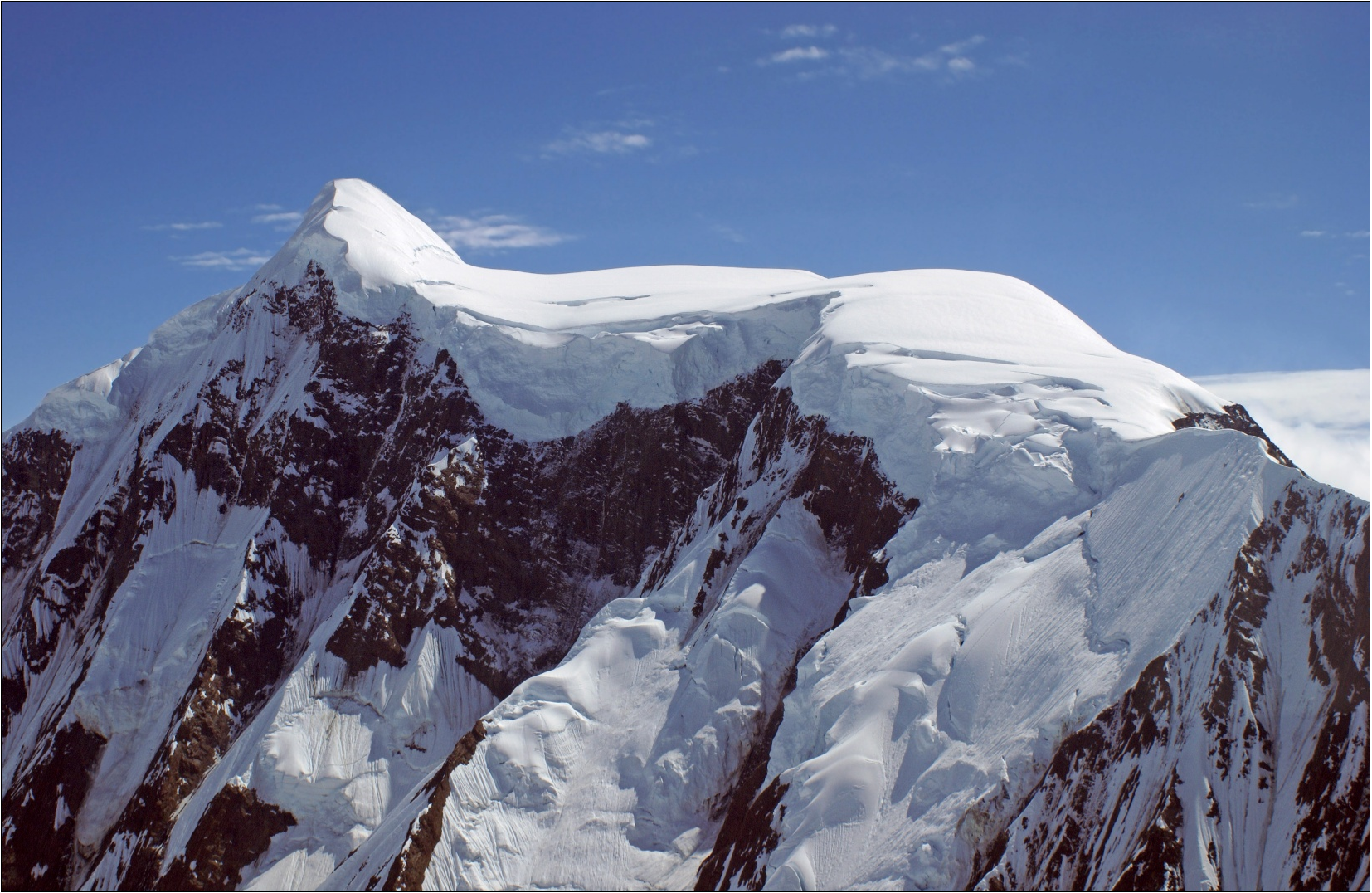
Bertha's summit detail, from northwest

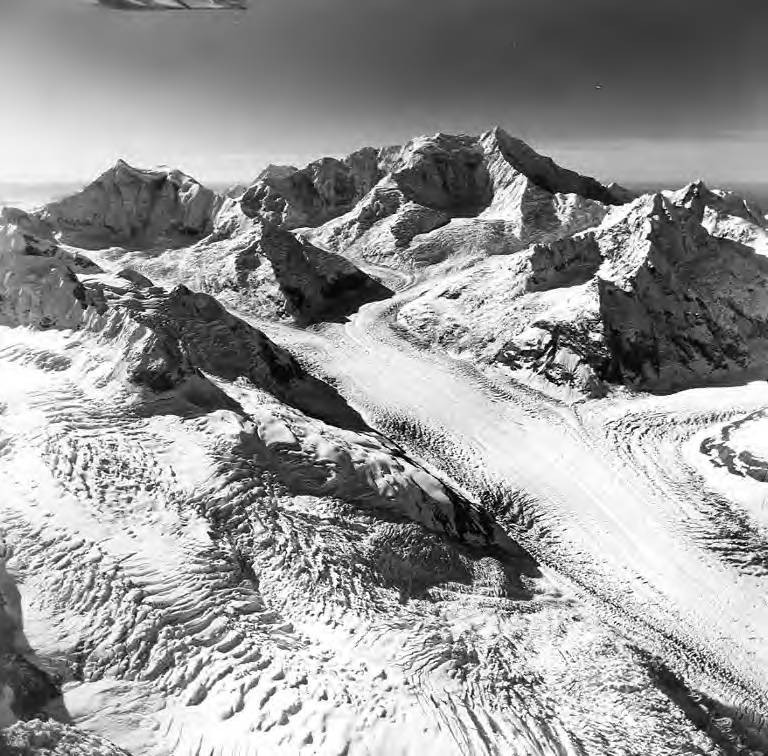
Bertha upper left with Mt. Crillon and Johns Hopkins Glacier. by Austin Post 1973

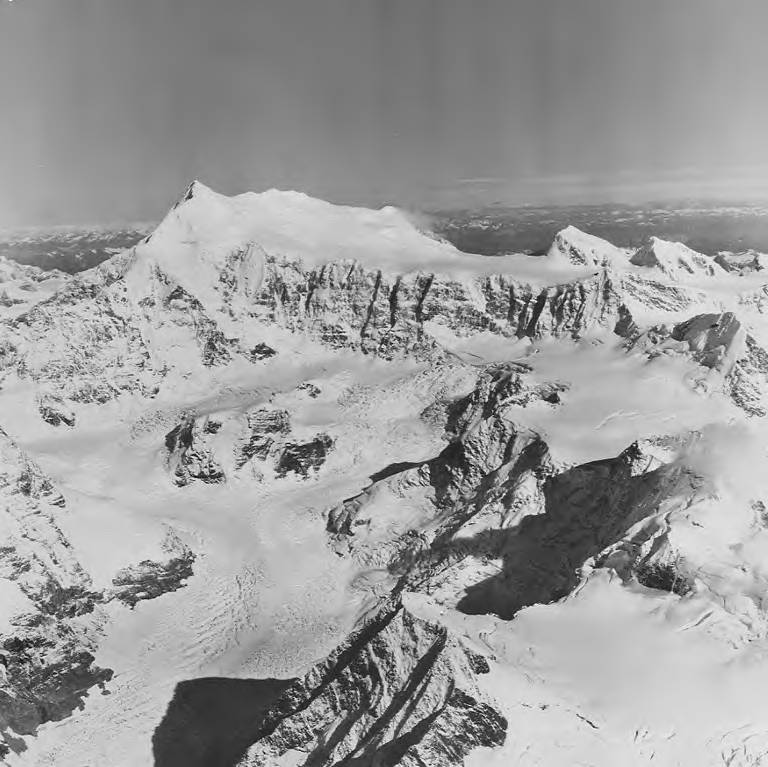
by Austin Post 1972

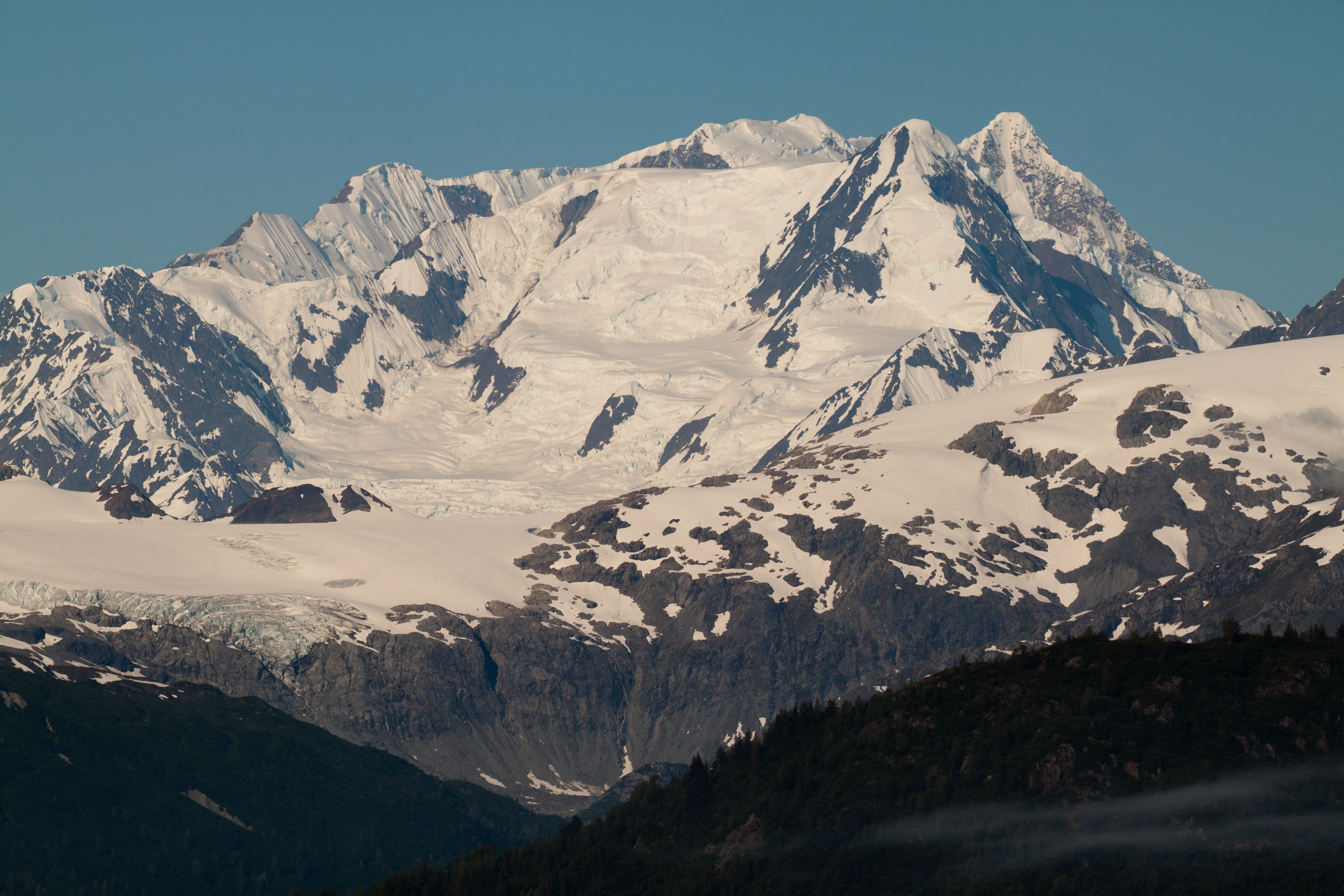
Bertha in front of Crillon

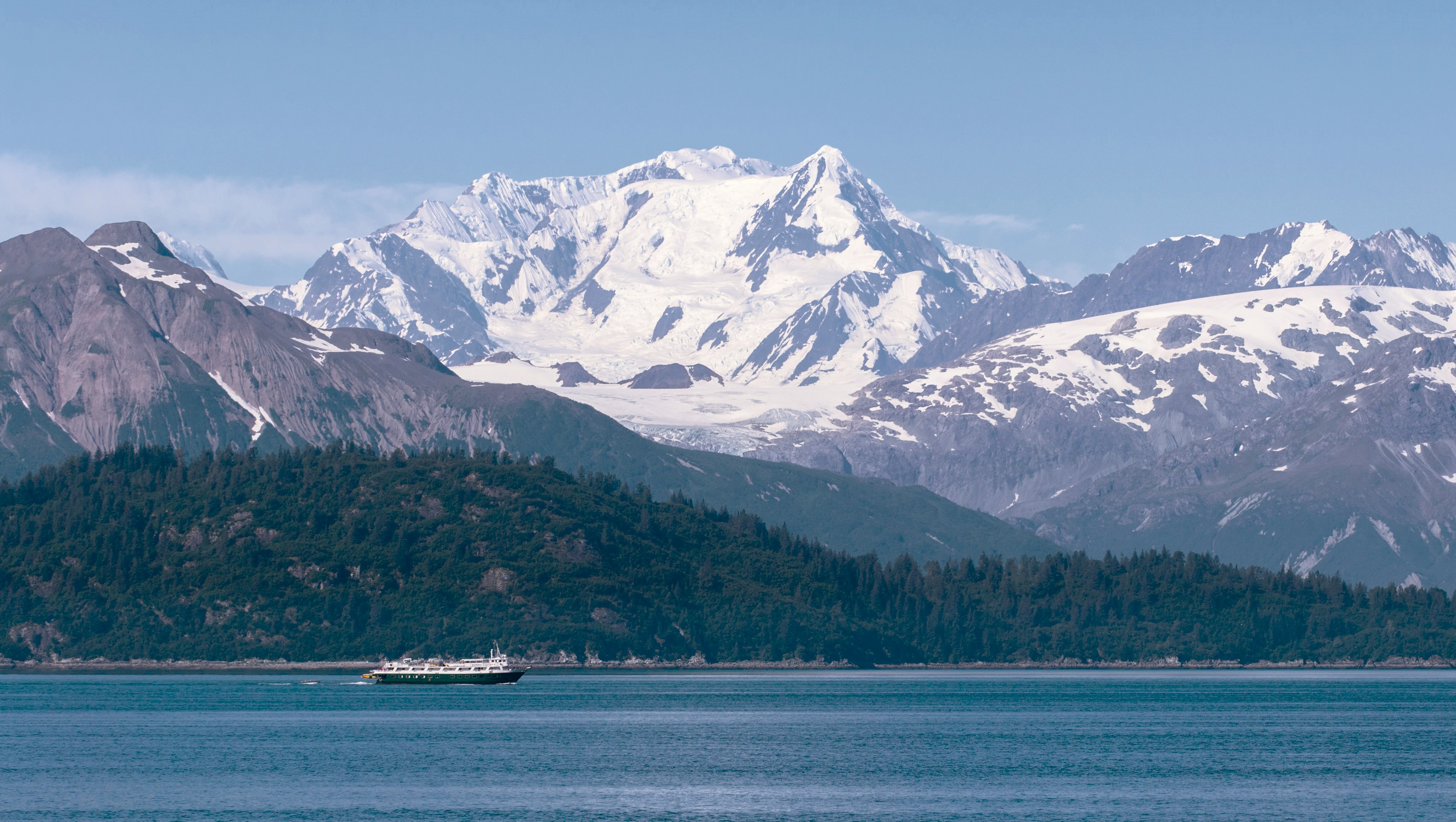
East aspect of Mount Bertha with Mt. Crillon partially visible behind

== See also ==
- Geography of Alaska
- Geology of Alaska
