= Ceratozetella denaliensis =

Scientific classification
- Kingdom: Animalia
- Phylum: Arthropoda
- Subphylum: Chelicerata
- Class: Arachnida
- Order: Oribatida
- Family: Ceratozetidae
- Genus: Ceratozetella
- Species: C. denaliensis

Binomial name
- Ceratozetella denaliensis (Behan-Pelletier, 1985)

Synonyms
- Cyrtozetes denaliensis

Species of mite

Ceratozetella denaliensis is a mite species in the family Ceratozetidae. It is endemic to Alaska and Yukon.

== Description ==
This mite is distinguished from others in the Ceratozetidae family by a strongly convex norogaster, a dentate distal margin, and a broad, lamelliform tutorium. It lives in tundras north of the 60th parallel north in Alaska and Yukon, including in Denali National Park and Preserve and Ivvavik National Park.

Two subspecies are recognized: Ceratozetella denaliensis denaliensis and Ceratozetella denaliensis minor.
