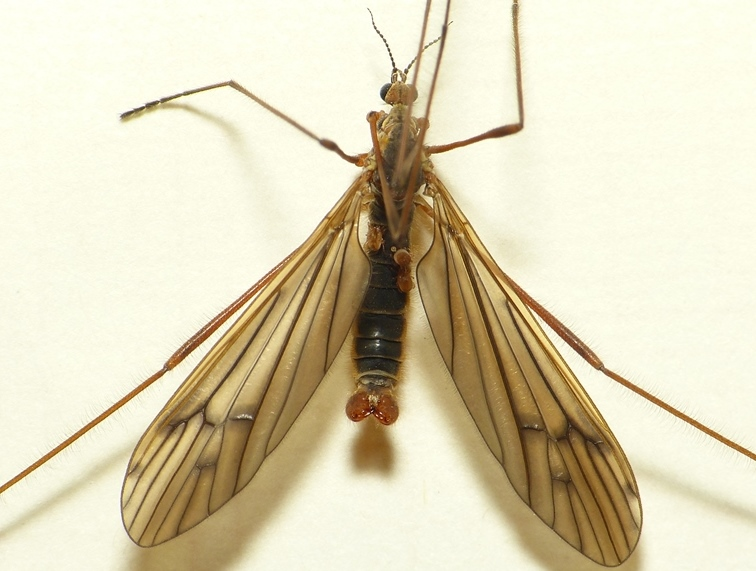

Scientific classification
- Kingdom: Animalia
- Phylum: Arthropoda
- Class: Insecta
- Order: Diptera
- Family: Limoniidae
- Genus: Symplecta
- Species: S. pilipes

Binomial name
- Symplecta pilipes (Fabricius, 1787)

= Symplecta pilipes =

Species of fly

Symplecta pilipes is a Palearctic species of cranefly in the family Limoniidae. It is found in a wide range of habitats and micro habitats: in earth rich in humus, in swamps and marshes, in leaf litter and in wet spots in woods.
