= Erigeron denalii =

Scientific classification
- Kingdom: Plantae
- Clade: Tracheophytes
- Clade: Angiosperms
- Clade: Eudicots
- Clade: Asterids
- Order: Asterales
- Family: Asteraceae
- Genus: Erigeron
- Species: E. denali

Binomial name
- Erigeron denali A.Nelson

Synonyms
- Erigeron mexiae K.M.Becker; Erigeron purpuratus var. dilatatus B.Boivin

Species of flowering plant

Erigeron denalii is a North American species of flowering plants in the family Asteraceae known by the common name Denali fleabane. It is found in Alaska, Yukon, British Columbia, and Northwest Territories.

Erigeron denalii is a very short perennial herb rarely more than 5 cm (2 inches) tall. Each stem generally has only one flower head, with 30–55 white or lavender ray florets surrounding numerous yellow disc florets.

The species is named for Denali, the tallest mountain in North America.
