= Sarah Doherty =

American mountaineer and skier (1959–2023)

- Born: December 21, 1959; Taunton, Massachusetts
- Died: January 5, 2023 (aged 63)
- Occupations: Mountaineer; occupational therapist; entrepreneur

Sarah Doherty (December 21, 1959 – January 5, 2023) was an American and Canadian amputee mountaineer, ski racer, motivational speaker, and entrepreneur who lost her right leg to a drunk driver at age 13. She was a member of the inaugural U.S. National Disabled Ski Team and was the first amputee to reach the summit of Denali. She studied Occupational Therapy at Boston University (1977–1982) gaining a BSc Occupational Therapy; and then worked as a pediatric occupational therapist. In 2014, Doherty received the Woman of Achievement award from Girls Incorporated of Taunton. Doherty died unexpectedly in 2023 at the age of 63.

== Ski racing ==
Six months after losing her leg, Doherty began learning how to ski on one leg using outrigger ski poles. She began competing in regional ski races in the Mount Sunapee area with the New England Handicapped Sportsman Association (NEHSA). Under the direction of her coach, Disabled Sports USA founder Kirk Bauer, Doherty was awarded the Ben Allen Cup as the NEHSA's most improved skier. She moved to Winter Park, Colorado in 1985 to pursue ski racing full-time. She was later selected as an alternate for the U.S. National Disabled Ski Team that first showcased adaptive skiing at the 1988 Olympic Winter Games in Calgary.

== Hiking and mountaineering ==
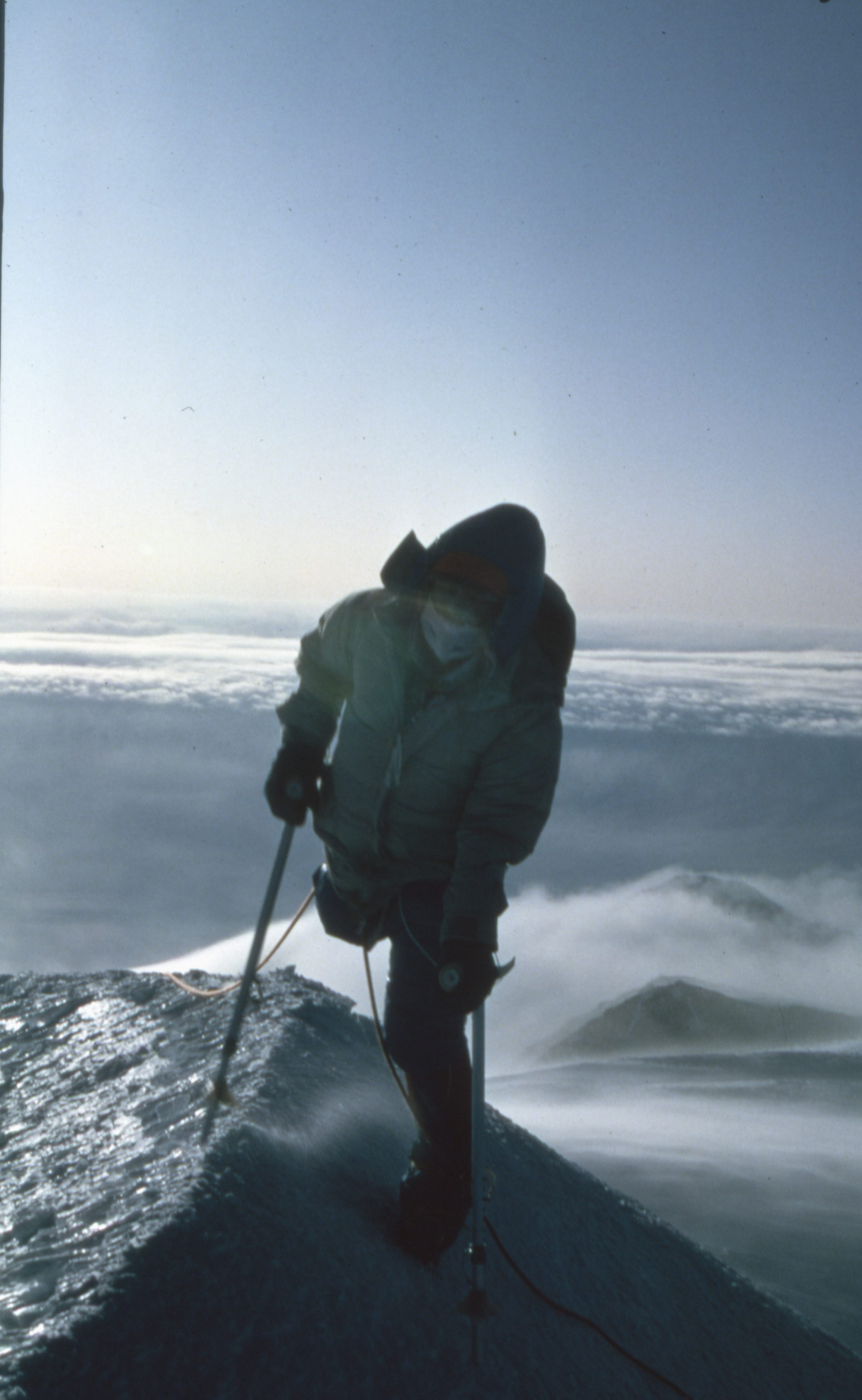
Sarah Doherty approaching the summit of Denali

Doherty began alpine hiking while working as an occupational therapist in Seattle, Washington. She soon branched out into mountaineering and in 1984 became the first one-legged woman to summit Mount Rainier. The following year, she became the first amputee to summit Denali without a prosthetic limb.

== Adaptive equipment design ==
Doherty began working with adaptive crutch designs while preparing to climb Denali. Her first crutch prototype was an aluminum-bodied forearm crutch with a polyurethane basket for the tip. She used these crutches during the climb. She started designing a new model of forearm crutch soon after meeting her partner, structural engineer Kerith Perreur-Lloyd. They began making prototypes for a new crutch design, and after five years of development they formed a company to promote their new crutch called SideStix Ventures Inc. Doherty field tested the crutches on the West Coast Trail in 2008 and Mount Kilimanjaro in 2009. In 2011, her company placed 2nd in the inaugural BCIC New Ventures Competition. Doherty's company is based out of Roberts Creek, British Columbia.
