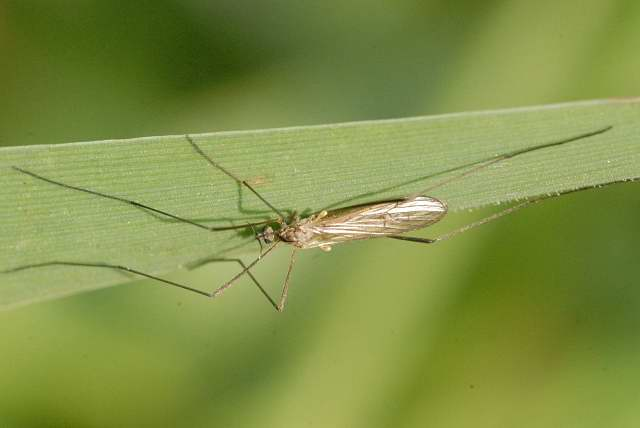
- Symplecta pilipes

Scientific classification
- Kingdom: Animalia
- Phylum: Arthropoda
- Class: Insecta
- Order: Diptera
- Family: Limoniidae
- Subfamily: Chioneinae
- Tribe: Eriopterini
- Genus: Symplecta; Meigen, 1830

Type species
- Limnobia punctipennis Meigen, 1818

Subgenera
- Hoploerioptera Alexander, 1953; Podoneura Bergroth, 1888; Psiloconopa Zetterstedt, 1838; Symplecta Meigen, 1830; Trimicra (Osten Sacken, 1861)

Synonyms
- Helobia Lepeletier & Serville; Idioneura Philippi, 1866; Kowarzia Thalhammer, 1900.

= Symplecta =

Genus of flies

Symplecta is a genus of crane fly in the family Limoniidae.

== Species ==
- Subgenus Hoploerioptera Alexander, 1953

- S. honshuensis (Alexander, 1958)
- S. luctuosipes Alexander, 1953
- S. shikokuensis Alexander, 1953

- Subgenus Podoneura Bergroth, 1888

- S. anthracogramma (Bergroth, 1888)
- S. apphidion (Alexander, 1958)
- S. bequaertiana (Alexander, 1930)
- S. brevifurcata (Alexander, 1930)
- S. harteni Hancock, 2006
- S. peregrinator (Alexander, 1944)
- S. triangula (Alexander, 1975)

- Subgenus Psiloconopa Zetterstedt, 1838

- S. alexanderi (Savchenko, 1973)
- S. beringiana Savchenko, 1979
- S. bispinigera (Alexander, 1930)
- S. bisulca (Alexander, 1949)
- S. bizarrea (Stary, 1992)
- S. cancriformis (Alexander, 1975)
- S. carsoni (Alexander, 1955)
- S. churchillensis (Alexander, 1938)
- S. cramptonella (Alexander, 1931)
- S. denali (Alexander, 1955)
- S. diadexia (Alexander, 1966)
- S. dorothea (Alexander, 1914)
- S. ecalcar (Alexander, 1949)
- S. epicharis (Alexander, 1966)
- S. fausta (Alexander, 1957)
- S. fenestrata (de Meijere, 1913)
- S. gobiensis (Alexander, 1922)
- S. hirsutissima (Alexander, 1966)
- S. hygropetrica (Alexander, 1943)
- S. irata (Alexander, 1949)
- S. janetscheki (Alexander, 1968)
- S. laevis (Alexander, 1930)
- S. laticeps (Alexander, 1916)
- S. laudatrix (Alexander, 1947)
- S. lindrothi (Tjeder, 1955)
- S. lucia (Alexander, 1914)
- S. luliana (Alexander, 1934)
- S. mafuluensis (Alexander, 1948)
- S. mckinleyana (Alexander, 1955)
- S. megarhabda (Alexander, 1943)
- S. meigeni (Zetterstedt, 1838)
- S. microcellula (Alexander, 1914)
- S. neomexicana (Alexander, 1929)
- S. nigrohalterata (Alexander, 1958)
- S. peayi (Alexander, 1948)
- S. polycantha (Alexander, 1945)
- S. preclara (Alexander, 1964)
- S. preclaroides (Alexander, 1964)
- S. propensa (Alexander, 1935)
- S. punctulata (de Meijere, 1919)
- S. pusilla (Schiner, 1865)
- S. rainieria (Alexander, 1943)
- S. recurva (Alexander, 1949)
- S. rutshuruensis (Alexander, 1956)
- S. shoshone (Alexander, 1945)
- S. sinawava (Alexander, 1948)
- S. sparsa (Alexander, 1919)
- S. stictica (Meigen, 1818)
- S. sweetmani (Alexander, 1940)
- S. sylleptor (Alexander, 1957)
- S. taficola (Alexander, 1948)
- S. telfordi (Alexander, 1948)
- S. tridenticulata (Alexander, 1936)
- S. trilaciniata Savchenko, 1982
- S. verna (Alexander, 1920)
- S. winthemi (Alexander, 1922)
- S. yasumatsui (Alexander, 1954)
- S. zukeli (Alexander, 1940)

- Subgenus Symplecta Meigen, 1830

- S. cana (Walker, 1848)
- S. chosenensis (Alexander, 1940)
- S. colombiana (Alexander, 1937)
- S. echinata Stary & Brodo, 2009
- S. edlundae Stary & Brodo, 2009
- S. elongata Loew, 1874
- S. grata Loew, 1873
- S. holdgatei (Freeman, 1962)
- S. horrida (Lackschewitz, 1964)
- S. hybrida (Meigen, 1804)
- S. mabelana (Alexander, 1955)
- S. macroptera (Philippi, 1866)
- S. novaezemblae (Alexander, 1922)
- S. scotica (Edwards, 1938)
- S. sheldoni (Alexander, 1955)
- S. tripilata (Alexander, 1957)

- Subgenus Trimicra (Osten Sacken, 1861)

- S. antipodarum (Alexander, 1953)
- S. brachyptera (Alexander, 1955)
- S. campbellicola (Alexander, 1964)
- S. confluens (Alexander, 1922)
- S. inconstans (Alexander, 1922)
- S. macquariensis (Alexander, 1962)
- S. pilipes (Fabricius, 1787)
