= Bradford Washburn =

American explorer, mountaineer, photographer, and cartographer (1910–2007)

- Born: Henry Bradford Washburn Jr. June 7, 1910; Cambridge, Massachusetts
- Died: January 10, 2007 (aged 96); Lexington, Massachusetts
- Education: Harvard University
- Occupations: Explorer, mountaineer, photographer, cartographer, museum director
- Known for: Founder and director of the Museum of Science (Boston)
- Spouse: Barbara Washburn

Henry Bradford Washburn Jr. (June 7, 1910 – January 10, 2007) was an American explorer, mountaineer, photographer, and cartographer. He established the Boston Museum of Science, served as its director from 1939 to 1980, and from 1985 until his death served as its Honorary Director (a lifetime appointment). Bradford married Barbara Polk in 1940 and honeymooned in Alaska, making the first ascent of Mount Bertha together.

Washburn is especially noted for exploits in four areas.

- He was one of the leading American mountaineers in the 1920s through the 1950s, putting up first ascents and new routes on many major Alaskan peaks, often with his wife, Barbara Washburn, one of the pioneers among female mountaineers and the first woman to summit Denali (Mount McKinley).
- He pioneered the use of aerial photography in the analysis of mountains and in planning mountaineering expeditions. His thousands of striking black-and-white photos, mostly of Alaskan peaks and glaciers, are known for their wealth of informative detail and their artistry. They are the reference standard for route photos of Alaskan climbs.
- He was responsible for creating maps of various mountain ranges, including Denali, Mount Everest, and the Presidential Range in New Hampshire.
- His stewardship of the Boston Museum of Science.

Several of these achievements – e.g. the Everest map and subsequent further work on the elevation and geology of Everest – were carried out when Washburn was in his 70s and 80s.

== Biography ==
Washburn was born on June 7, 1910, in Cambridge, Massachusetts, to a Boston Brahmin family whose roots trace back to Mayflower passenger Elder William Brewster. Brewster was the Pilgrim colonist leader and a spiritual elder of the Plymouth Colony.

Washburn's father, the Very Rev. Henry Bradford Washburn Sr., was an avid outdoorsman, and was dean of the Episcopal Theological School in Cambridge, Massachusetts. Washburn's mother was Edith Buckingham Hall.

His younger brother was Sherwood Larned Washburn, nicknamed "Sherry", who was a physical anthropologist and pioneer in the field of primatology.

He received an undergraduate degree from Harvard University, where he was a member of the Harvard Mountaineering Club. He returned to Harvard to earn a master's degree in geology and geography in 1960.

Washburn was an avid pilot and made his first solo flight in a Fleet biplane at Boeing Field in Seattle in 1934. He earned his private flying license at Roosevelt Field on Long Island later that year.

== Expeditions ==
Washburn embarked on a notable expedition in 1937 to 17,147 feet (5,226 m) Mount Lucania in the Yukon. To do this he and climbing partner Robert Bates had to reach Walsh Glacier, 8,750 ft (2,670 m) above sea level. He called upon Bob Reeve, a famous Alaskan bush pilot, who later replied by cable to Washburn, "Anywhere you'll ride, I'll fly". The ski-equipped Fairchild F-51 made several trips to the landing site on the glacier without event in May, but on landing with Washburn and Bates in June, the plane sank into unseasonal slush. Washburn, Bates and Reeve pressed hard for five days to get the airplane out and Reeve was eventually able to get the airplane airborne with all excess weight removed and the assistance of a smooth icefall with a steep drop. Washburn and Bates continued on foot to make the first ascent of Lucania, and after an epic descent and journey to civilization, they hiked over 150 miles through the wilderness to safety in the small town of Burwash Landing. As Reeve had been unable to return to the glacier with his aircraft, Washburn and Bates chose to leave behind or dump a 900-pound (410 kg) cache of supplies. This cache was located and recovered in 2022.

== Honors ==
Washburn was elected a fellow of the American Academy of Arts and Sciences in 1956.

Washburn gathered many awards over the course of his career, including nine honorary doctorates.

In 1979, he received Gold Medal of the Royal Scottish Geographical Society for "outstanding contributions to cartographic research."

He and his wife received two awards from the National Geographic Society. In 1980, they received the Alexander Graham Bell Medal, and in 1988 they received the Centennial Award.

In 1979, he received Gold Medal of the Royal Scottish Geographical Society for "outstanding contributions to cartographic research."

In 1998, he was awarded the Royal Geographical Society's Cherry Kearton Medal and Award.

In 1994, he received King Albert Medal of Merit from Belgium's King Albert Foundation in recognition of "his guiding spirit in the ambitious and successful enterprise of making a new large-scale map of the roof of the world from 1982 to 1991."

== Death ==
Washburn died of heart failure on January 10, 2007, at the age of 96, in a retirement home in Lexington, Massachusetts. In addition to his wife, he left a son, Edward, and two daughters, Dorothy and Elizabeth.

== Bradford Washburn American Mountaineering Museum ==
The Bradford Washburn American Mountaineering Museum (BWAMM) is devoted to mountaineering, the mountains, science and art, and the dissemination of knowledge – all things that Washburn exemplified. BWAMM is a joint project of the American Alpine Club, Colorado Mountain Club, and National Geographic Society, and is located in Golden, Colorado, Feb. 16, 2008.

== Selected Alaskan first ascents ==
- 1933: Pointed Peak, Fairweather Range, Saint Elias Mountains
- 1934: East Ridge above the Plateau Mount Crillon, Fairweather Range, Alaska, USA. FA with H. Adams Carter, summit attained July 19, 1934.
- 1937: Mount Lucania, Saint Elias Mountains, Yukon, Canada
- 1938: Mount Marcus Baker, Chugach Mountains
- 1938: Mount Sanford, Wrangell Mountains
- 1940: Mount Bertha, Fairweather Range, Saint Elias Mountains
- 1941: Mount Hayes, Alaska Range
- 1944: Mount Deception, Alaska Range
- 1947: McGonagall Mountain, Alaska Range
- 1951: West Buttress Route on Denali, Alaska Range
- 1951: Kahiltna Dome, Alaska Range
- 1955: Mount Dickey, Alaska Range
