= Barbara Washburn =

American mountaineer (1914–2014)

- Born: Barbara Polk; November 10, 1914; Boston, Massachusetts
- Died: September 25, 2014 (aged 99); Lexington, Massachusetts
- Education: Smith College
- Spouse: Bradford Washburn

Barbara Washburn (née Polk) (November 10, 1914 – September 25, 2014) was an American mountaineer. She became the first woman to climb Denali (Mount McKinley) on June 6, 1947. She was the wife and climbing partner of mountaineer and scientist Bradford Washburn.

== Early life ==
Barbara Washburn, née Polk, grew up in the Boston-area suburb of West Roxbury, Massachusetts. She attended the Boston Girls Latin School and graduated from Smith College. As a young woman, she took courses at Harvard University and worked as a secretary for Bradford Washburn, then the director of the New England Museum of Natural History (now the Boston Museum of Science). When the Washburns announced their engagement, Barbara Washburn resigned from her job at the museum. They married on April 27, 1940, honeymooned in New Hampshire, then spent the summer on an Alaskan expedition.

== Mountaineering and first ascents ==
=== Mount Bertha ===
Shortly after marrying Bradford Washburn, Barbara Washburn was asked to accompany her husband and a team of six others on an expedition to attempt the first ascent of remote 10,182 ft (3,103 m) Mount Bertha, a mountain in the Fairweather range of Alaska, during the early summer of 1940. As the expedition's leader, Bradford Washburn envisioned a relatively casual affair. Besides Barbara Washburn, who had no mountaineering experience, a 16-year-old Lowell Thomas Jr. came along at the request of his father, Lowell Thomas. According to Bradford Washburn's later recounting, "His father figured that if Barbara was going it must be easy".

Washburn wrote that prior to her marriage, "I had no mountaineering background". Once in Alaska, the team ferried heavy loads up through a series of camps along the flanks of the mountain. She recalled of that time, "I had no real feeling about being a pioneering woman on a serious Alaskan expedition. I only knew that as the only woman, I had to measure up." On the first attempt at the summit, the team climbed too slowly and had to turn back 1700ft from the top. On the way down, Bradford Washburn decided that they should rappel down an open crevasse to save time. According to Washburn, she learned to rappel on the fly with only brief instructions: "Now tie the rope around your waist....you just swing across this ice slope, and this is called rappelling." For the second summit attempt, three team members, Lowell Thomas Jr., Alva Morrison and Lee Wilson, decided to remain in camp. The remaining five, Barbara and Bradford Washburn, with Maynard Miller, Michl Feuersinger and Thomas Winship, achieved the summit on July 30, 1940. In August, as they returned to Juneau, Alaska, Washburn felt that she was not recovering from the ordeal as quickly as the others and sought the advice of a doctor, only to learn that she was a few months pregnant.

=== Mount Hayes ===
In 1941, fearing that war time activities would preclude further expedition opportunities, Bradford Washburn pushed for the couple to take on a new challenge. Mount Hayes, a 13,832 ft (4,216 m) peak in the Hayes Range of Alaska, had been subject to two previous attempts at the summit, one reaching 11,000 ft (3,400 m), but had not yet had a first ascent. Bradford Washburn later recalled it being one of the few expeditions the couple did with no additional angle, such as map-making or scientific discovery, but simply for the fun of it, in fear that the war would irrevocably alter their circumstances and prevent any future adventures. With a three-month-old baby, Washburn was initially reluctant to go on the trip, but was eventually persuaded. Bradford Washburn's parents would care for the infant Dorothy "Dottie" Washburn in their absence. The Washburns assembled an experienced team, including Ben Ferris, Sterling Hendricks, Bill Shand, Robin Montgomery and Henry Hall.

The remote location of Mount Hayes required a complex plan of approach. The group was able to fly supplies into an impromptu landing spot approximately 19 miles northeast of Mount Hayes, with the help of bush pilot Johnny Lynn. Further supplies were air dropped at various points closer to the mountain, and the whole team met up near the start of the Hayes glacier at 4,600 ft on July 17, 1941. Further supplies were parachuted to the climbers and they established a base camp at 4,900 ft with enough supplies to last 30 days. Between July 21 and 24, the team ferried loads up the shoulder of the mountain to 8,300 ft, with some delays for poor weather. Robin Montgomery departed from the expedition, as planned, to rendezvous with a bush plane on August 1, leaving five remaining.

Perched in a notch above 9000 ft, the climbers set up a forward camp. On July 29, 1941, they made a reconnaissance mission towards the summit, intending to perhaps complete the entire climb. The crux appeared as a "knife-like crest," according to Bradford Washburn, "a tenuous arete of snow and ice, thin as paper, wound into another cleft 300 yards away." With poor weather setting in, the climbers decided not to attempt the final sections. On August 1, the team planned a second attempt. Henry Hall, though an experienced climber, at 46 years old, was older than the rest of the team. Worn out from the first attempt, he decided to remain in camp for the second attempt. More stable weather conditions, and fixed ropes and ice steps cut during the previous climb quickened their way to the final stretches.

At the crux, Washburn was chosen to lead the knife-like ridge, with the rationale that as the lightest climber, she would be easiest for the others to pull back up if the ridge should give way. A climber from a later expedition to Mt. Hayes would describe this section as "so narrow and the snow so soft that you could not put your feet side by side." Bradford Washburn's biographer, David Roberts, questioned the rationale for Washburn's lead, writing that "the crux pitches on a mountain such as Hayes should have been led by the best climber, which in this case was Brad. He weighed only about thirty pounds more than his wife. [...] Had Barbara slipped off the ridge, or broken loose a cornice or even a chunk of the ridge, she would have taken a long, horrific pendulum fall down the sheer precipice on either the east or the west side. Even held on belay, she might have seriously injured herself, and it would have been no easy matter to get her back up to the ridge." In Washburn's obituary, the American Alpine Journal singled out this section of the climb as her greatest feat of mountaineering, noting that "what was probably the hardest bit of technical climbing Brad ever performed in his long Alaskan career was a ridge traverse led by his wife." The ridge did not give way, and the climbers reached the summit that afternoon.

=== Denali ===
Barbara Washburn was asked to return to Alaska to participate in Operation White Tower, an attempt at climbing Denali (then Mount McKinley) in 1947. The expedition was funded by RKO Pictures, who planned to use publicity from the climb to attract public interest towards an upcoming film, set in the Alps, The White Tower. Originally, studio executives wanted to support a trip to Mount Everest, but were convinced by Bradford Washburn that this was geopolitically unfeasible in the immediate aftermath of World War II. Now a mother of three, Washburn was initially hesitant to join the climb, but eventually agreed after consulting the family physician, who assured her a lengthy absence would not harm the children.

The first ascent of the south (higher) peak occurred in 1913. Denali is approximately 130 miles South-Southwest of Fairbanks, Alaska, 20,310 ft in height, with the upper reaches permanently swathed in snow and glaciers. Operation White Tower drew together complex interests. The New England Museum supported scientific, surveying and photographic endeavors during the climb. The U.S. Air Force, interested in cosmic ray research and high altitude camping, helped with logistics, while the Alaska Communications System set up the team with radio support. The National Park Service allowed the use of a ranger station, while Chief Ranger Grant Pearson accompanied the expedition. Four representatives from RKO also took part in the expedition to capture photography, film and written accounts of the climb.

In the end, 17 people would take part in the actual expedition: Carl Anderson, George Brown, Hakon Christensen, Robert Craig, William Deeke, Sgt. James Gale, William Hackett, Robert Lange, Earl Norris, Grant Pearson, Leonard Shannon, Harvey Solberg, William Sterling, H.T. Victoreen, Bradford Washburn, Barbara Washburn and George Wellstead. Washburn was the only woman on the climb. Washburn, Hackett and Lange were the first to reach the summit, on June 6, 1947, followed by Deeke, Craig, Gale, Browne and Bradford Washburn.

As the only woman on the expedition, Washburn became the first woman to climb Denali.

== Cartography and other work ==
The Washburns often worked in tandem, in areas of mountaineering, exploring, mapping, and museum administration. She did not realize that she had been the first woman to climb Denali until after their ascent. She typically accompanied her husband on his expeditions, and contributed to his work at the Boston Museum of Science.

With her husband, she completed a large-scale map of the Grand Canyon, published as a National Geographic magazine supplement in July 1978. For that achievement and others, the Washburns received in 1980 the Alexander Graham Bell Medal from the National Geographic Society. In 1981, the Washburns produced the most detailed and accurate map ever made of Mount Everest.

Washburn's memoir is The Accidental Adventurer: Memoir of the First Woman to Climb Mt. McKinley by Barbara Washburn, Lew Freedman, and Bradford Washburn, Epicenter Press, May 2001.

== Personal life ==
Barbara and Bradford Washburn raised three children, Dorothy, Edward and Elizabeth.
