= Symplecta denali =

Scientific classification
- Kingdom: Animalia
- Phylum: Arthropoda
- Class: Insecta
- Order: Diptera
- Family: Limoniidae
- Genus: Symplecta
- Species: S. denali

Binomial name
- Symplecta denali Alexander, 1955

Synonyms
- Erioptera denali (Alexander, 1955)

Species of crane fly

Symplecta denali is a crane fly species of the family Limoniidae. It is endemic to Alaska. Charles Paul Alexander first described the species in 1955 under the synonym Erioptera denali. The species holotype was collected near the Teklanika River in Denali National Park and Preserve. It is named after Denali.

== Description ==
The fly measures about 3.5 millimeters in length, with wings nearly 4 mm. The dorsal portion of its abdomen is dark brown with yellow-bordered tergites; its ventral abdomen is yellow. The mesothorax is brown-gray on top and yellow on the sides. The head is dark gray, the legs are dark brown, and the antennae are yellow. The wings are narrow and brown-tinged.
