= Tipula denali =

Scientific classification
- Kingdom: Animalia
- Phylum: Arthropoda
- Clade: Pancrustacea
- Class: Insecta
- Order: Diptera
- Family: Tipulidae
- Genus: Tipula
- Subgenus: Arctotipula
- Species: T. denali

Binomial name
- Tipula denali Alexander, 1969

Species of crane fly

Tipula denali is a crane fly species of the family Tipulidae. It is endemic to Alaska. The species holotype was collected from Muldrow Glacier in Denali National Park and Preserve. It is named after Denali.

== Description ==
The fly's length is about 16 millimeters, with wings about 14.5 mm and antennae about 4 mm. It is dark gray with black antennae; its wings are yellowish-white with brown patterning.
