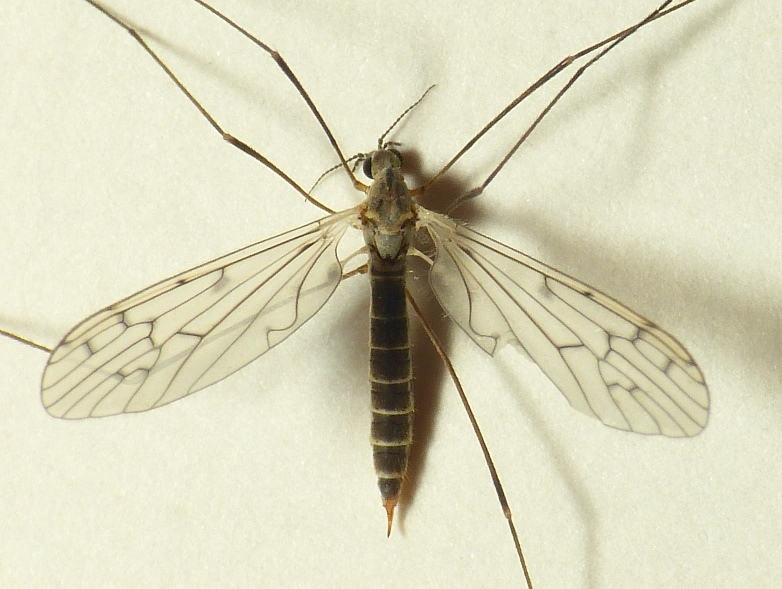
- Symplecta hybrida Netherlands

Scientific classification
- Kingdom: Animalia
- Phylum: Arthropoda
- Clade: Pancrustacea
- Class: Insecta
- Order: Diptera
- Family: Limoniidae
- Genus: Symplecta
- Species: S. hybrida

Binomial name
- Symplecta hybrida (Meigen, 1804)

= Symplecta hybrida =

Species of fly

Symplecta hybrida is a Palearctic species of crane fly in the family Limoniidae.It is found in a wide range of habitats and micro habitats: in earth rich in humus, in swamps and marshes, in leaf litter and in wet spots in woods.
