= Ceratozetidae =

Scientific classification
- Kingdom: Animalia
- Phylum: Arthropoda
- Subphylum: Chelicerata
- Class: Arachnida
- Order: Oribatida
- Superfamily: Ceratozetoidea
- Family: Ceratozetidae; Jacot, 1925

Synonyms
- Euzetidae

Family of mites

Ceratozetidae is a family of mites belonging to the order Oribatida.

== Genera ==
Genera:

- Adoribatella Woolley, 1967
- Allozetes Berlese, 1913
- Austroceratobates Mahunka, 1985
- Ceratozetella Shaldybina, 1966
- Ceresella Pavlitchenko, 1993
- Edwardzetes (Nicolet, 1855)
- Macrogena Wallwork 1966
