= List of books about K2 =

The following is a list of books about K2, a mountain in the Karakorum Range between Pakistan and China, listed by expedition date:

1887 - (United Kingdom) British - Younghusband

- Francis Younghusband, The Heart of a Continent, 1896, (Yakushi Y27)

1892 - (United Kingdom) British - Conway

- Martin Conway, Climbing and Exploration in the Karakoram Himalayas, 1894, (Yakushi C336a)
- Oscar Eckenstein, The Karakorams and Kashmir Himalayas, 1896, (Yakushi E10)

1902 - International - Eckenstein and Crowley

- Charlie Buffet, Pionier am K2 - Jules Jacot-Guillarmod, 2012
- Aleister Crowley, The Confessions of Aleister Crowley, 1969
- Dr Jules Jacot-Guillarmod, Six Mois dans l'Himalaya, le Karakorum et l'Hindu-Kush., 1904, (Yakushi J17), ( (France) edition only)

1909 - (Italy) Italian - Luigi Amedeo

- Filippo De Filippi, La spedizione nel Karakoram e nell'Imalaia occidentale, 1912, (Yakushi F71a), ( (Italy) edition)
- Filippo De Filippi, Karakorum and Western Himalaya, 1912, (Yakushi F71b), ( (United Kingdom) / ( (United States) edition)
- Mirella Tenderini and Michael Shandrick, The Duke of Abruzzi: An Explorer's Life, 1997

1929 - (Italy) Italian - Aimone di Savoia-Aosta

- Aimone di Savoia-Aosta and Ardito Desio, La Spedizione Geografica Italiana al Karakoram, 1936, (Yakushi S670), ( (Italy) edition only)

1937 - (United Kingdom) British - Shipton

- Eric Shipton, Blank on the map, 1938, (Yakushi S432)

1938 American Karakoram expedition - (United States) American - Houston

- Charles Houston and Bob Bates, Five Miles High, 1939, (Yakushi B165)

1939 American Karakoram expedition - (United States) American - Wiessner

- Andrew Kauffman and William Putnam, K2; The 1939 Tragedy, 1992, (Yakushi K66)
- Fritz Wiessner, K2, Tragödien und Sieg am Zweithöchsten Berg der Erde, 1955, (Yakushi W152), ( (Germany) edition only)
- Jennifer Jordan, The Last Man on the Mountain: The Death of an American Adventurer on K2, 2010

1953 American Karakoram expedition - (United States) American - Houston

- Charles Houston and Bob Bates, K2, The Savage Mountain, 1954, (Yakushi H429a)
- Charles Houston, Bob Bates and George Bell, K2, 8611m, 1954, (Yakushi H430), ( (France) edition only)

1954 1954 Italian Karakoram expedition to K2 - (Italy) Italian - Desio

- Mohammad Ata-Ullah, Citizen of Two Worlds, 1960, (Yakushi A284)
- Walter Bonatti, The Mountains of My Life, 2001
- Walter Bonatti, Processo al K2, 1985, (Yakushi B453), ( (Italy) edition)
- Walter Bonatti, K2. La verità. 1954-2004, 2005, ( (Italy) edition)
- Achille Compagnoni, Uomini sul K2, 1958, (Yakushi C328), ( (Italy) edition only)
- Achille Compagnoni, Tricolore sul K2, 1965, (Yakushi C329), ( (Italy) edition only)
- Achille Compagnoni, K2: conquista italiana tra storia e memoria, 2004, ( (Italy) edition only)
- Ardito Desio, Ascent of K2. Second Highest Peak in the World, 1955, (Yakushi D167b), ( (United Kingdom) edition)
- Ardito Desio, Libro Bianco, 1956, (Yakushi D168), ( (Italy) edition only)
- Mario Fantin, Sogno Visuto, 1958, (Yakushi F10), ( (Italy) edition only)
- Lino Lacedelli and Giovanni Cenacchi, K2: The Price of Conquest, 2006, ( (United Kingdom) edition)
- Robert Marshall, K2. Lies and Treachery, 2009

1975 - (United States) American - Whittaker

- Galen Rowell, In the Throne Room of the Mountain Gods, 1977, (Yakushi R366)

1978 - (United States) American - Whittaker

- Cherie Bremer-Kamp / Cherie Bech, Living on the Edge, 1987, (Yakushi B558)
- Rick Ridgeway, The Last Step: The American Ascent of K2, 1980, (Yakushi R216)

1979 - (France) French - Mellet

- Bernard Mellet, K2. La victoire suspendu, 1980, (Yakushi M307), ( (France) edition only)

1979 - International - Messner

- Reinhold Messner and Alessandro Gogna, K2, Mountain of Mountains, 1981, (Yakushi M340c), ( (United Kingdom) edition)

1986

- John Barry, K2, Savage Mountain, Savage Summer, 1987, (Yakushi B135)
- Benoît Chamoux, Le Vertige de l'Infini, 1988, (Yakushi C125), ( (France) edition only)
- Jim Curran, K2, Triumph and Tragedy., 1987, (Yakushi C405a)
- Anna Czerwińska, Groza wokół K2, 1990, (Yakushi C420), ( (Poland) edition only)
- Kurt Diemberger, The Endless Knot: K2, Mountain of Dreams and Destiny, 1991, (Yakushi D234d), ( (United Kingdom) edition)

1993 - (United States) American / (Canada) Canadian - Allison

- Jim Haberl, K2, Dreams and Reality, 1994

2008

- Graham Bowley, No way down - Life and death on K2, 2010
- Marco Confortola, Giorni di ghiaccio. Agosto 2008. La tragedia del K2, 2009, ( (Italy) edition)
- Damien O'Brien, The Time Has Come: Ger McDonnell - His Life & His Death on K2, 2012
- Wilco van Rooijen, Surviving K2, 2010
- Freddie Wilkinson, One Mountain Thousand Summits, 2010
- Peter Zuckerman and Amanda Padoan, Buried in the Sky, 2012
- Pat Falvey and Pemba Gyalje Sherpa, The Summit: How Triumph Turned To Tragedy On K2's Deadliest Days, 2013

General literature on 'K2'

- Fulvio Campiotti, K2, 1954, (Yakushi C36), ( (Italy) edition only)
- Jim Curran, K2, The Story of the Savage Mountain, 1995
- Kurt Diemberger and Roberto Mantovani, K2. Challenging the sky, 1995
- Heidi Howkins, K2: One Woman's Quest for the Summit, 2001
- Maurice Isserman and Stewart Weaver, Fallen Giants: A History of Himalayan Mountaineering from the Age of Empire to the Age of Extremes, 2008
- Dušan Jelinčič, Zvezdnate noči (Starry Nights), 2006
- Jennifer Jordan, Savage Summit: The True Stories of the First Five Women Who Climbed K2, 2005
- Jon Krakauer, Eiger Dreams: Ventures Among Men and Mountains, 1997
- Kenneth Mason, Abode of Snow, 1955, (Yakushi M214a), ( (United Kingdom) edition)
- Bernadette McDonald, Brotherhood of the Rope: The biography of Charles Houston, 2007
- Reinhold Messner, K2 Chogori. La grande montagna, 2004, ( (Italy) edition)
- Greg Mortenson and David Oliver Relin, Three Cups of Tea: One Man's Mission to Promote Peace . . . One School at a Time, 2007
- Richard Sale, The Challenge of K2. A History of the Savage Mountain., 2011
- Mustansar Hussain Tarar, K2 Kahani, (in Urdu), 1994
- Ed Viesturs, No Shortcuts to the Top: Climbing the World's 14 Highest Peaks, 2007
- Ed Viesturs, K2: Life and Death on the World's Most Dangerous Mountain, Aug 2010
- Mick Conefrey, The Ghosts of K2: The Epic Saga of the First Ascent, April 2015
