= Mario Puchoz =

Italian mountaineer and guide (1918–1954)

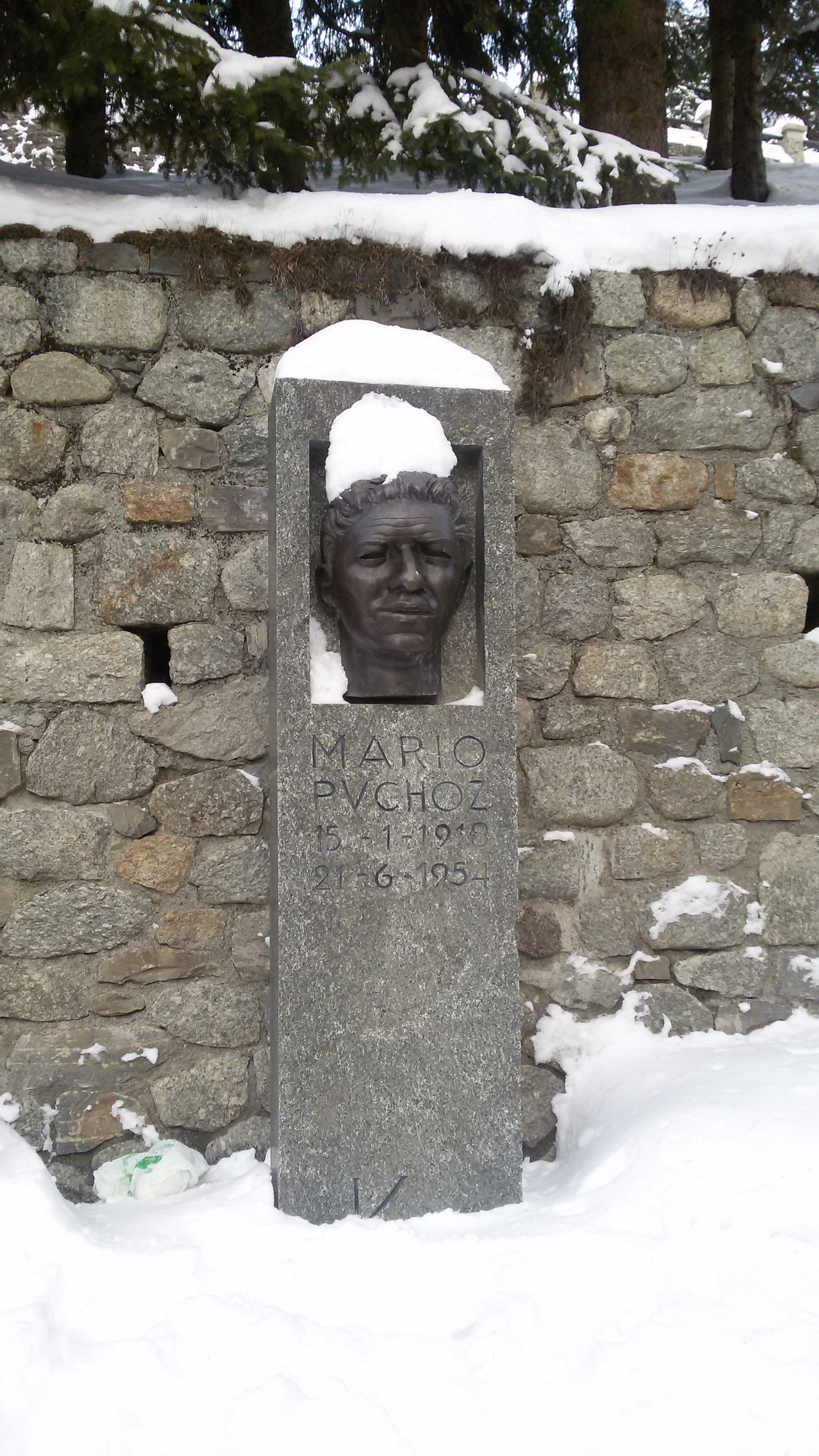
- Puchoz's memorial in Courmayeur
- Born: 15 January 1918; Courmayeur, Italy
- Died: 21 June 1954 (aged 36); K2
- Cause of death: High altitude pulmonary edema
- Burial place: Gilkey Memorial
- Occupations: Mountaineer and mountain guide
- Organization: Italian Alpine Club
- Known for: Member of first successful expedition to K2, second person to die mountaineering on K2

Mario Puchoz (pron. fr . AFI : [pyʃo] ) (15 January 1918 – 21 June 1954 ) was an Italian mountaineer and the second person to die attempting to climb K2. He was a member of the first expedition to successfully climb K2. Despite being one of the most promising climbers of the team, he died of high altitude pulmonary edema near camp 2.

== Biography ==
Puchoz was born and lived in Courmayeur, at the foot of Mont Blanc. From a peasant family, he became passionate about the mountains, becoming a mountain guide.

During the Second World War he was enlisted in the Alpine corps (Monte Cervino ski battalion), and participated in the Italian campaign in Russia in the Italian Expeditionary Force.

After the war, Puchoz continued his activity as a mountaineer and mountain guide.

=== K2 expedition ===
In 1953, he was summoned by Ardito Desio among the candidates to form the Italian expedition to attempt the first ascent of K2 in 1954; having passed the selections, Puchoz left with the other members of the expedition towards Pakistan.

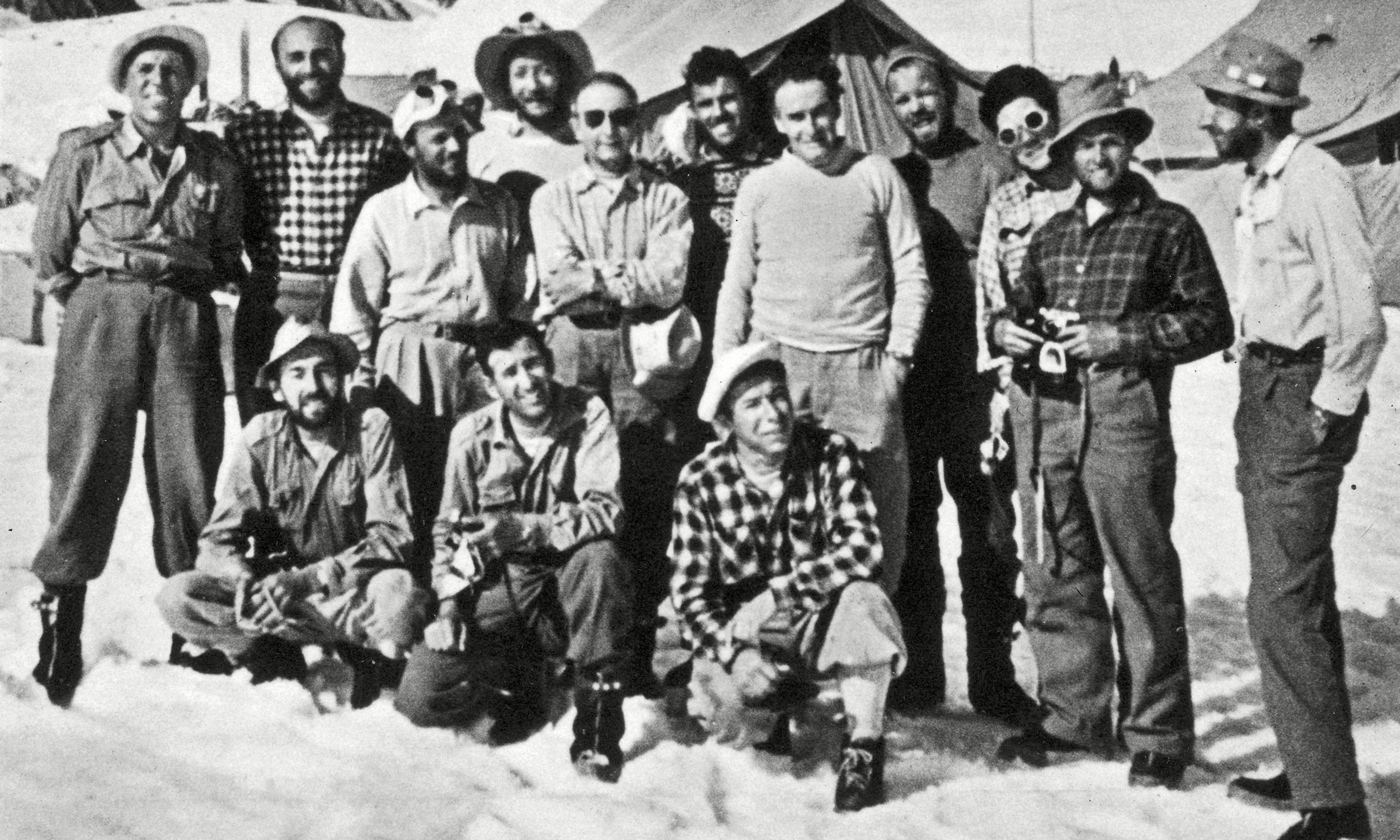
The 1954 K2 team, Puchoz is pictured in the front row, far right.

He participated with his other expedition companions in the preparation of the climbing route, the transport of materials and the establishment of the various base camps. On 18 June 1954, while he was at Camp II, at around 6,000 meters above sea level, Puchoz began to feel some discomfort, but it did not seem worried, and expressed the desire to remain at Camp II. On 20 June, however, his condition suddenly worsened, and, despite the care of Dr. Guido Pagani, the expedition's doctor, Mario died at one in the morning on 21 June.

Dr. Pagani's diagnosis was fulminant pneumonia. Today, in light of medical progress in general and knowledge of the problems of high altitude in particular, it is believed that the cause of Mario Puchoz's death was high altitude pulmonary edema.

Due to bad weather, the expedition companions could not reach Camp II until 26 July; Puchoz's body was recovered and transported to the base camp, where he was buried near Arthur Gilkey's tomb (where today the Gilkey memorial stands).

Despite Puchoz's death, the expedition continued the climb in his memory. Puchoz was the second person to die attempting to climb K2 after Art Gilkey.

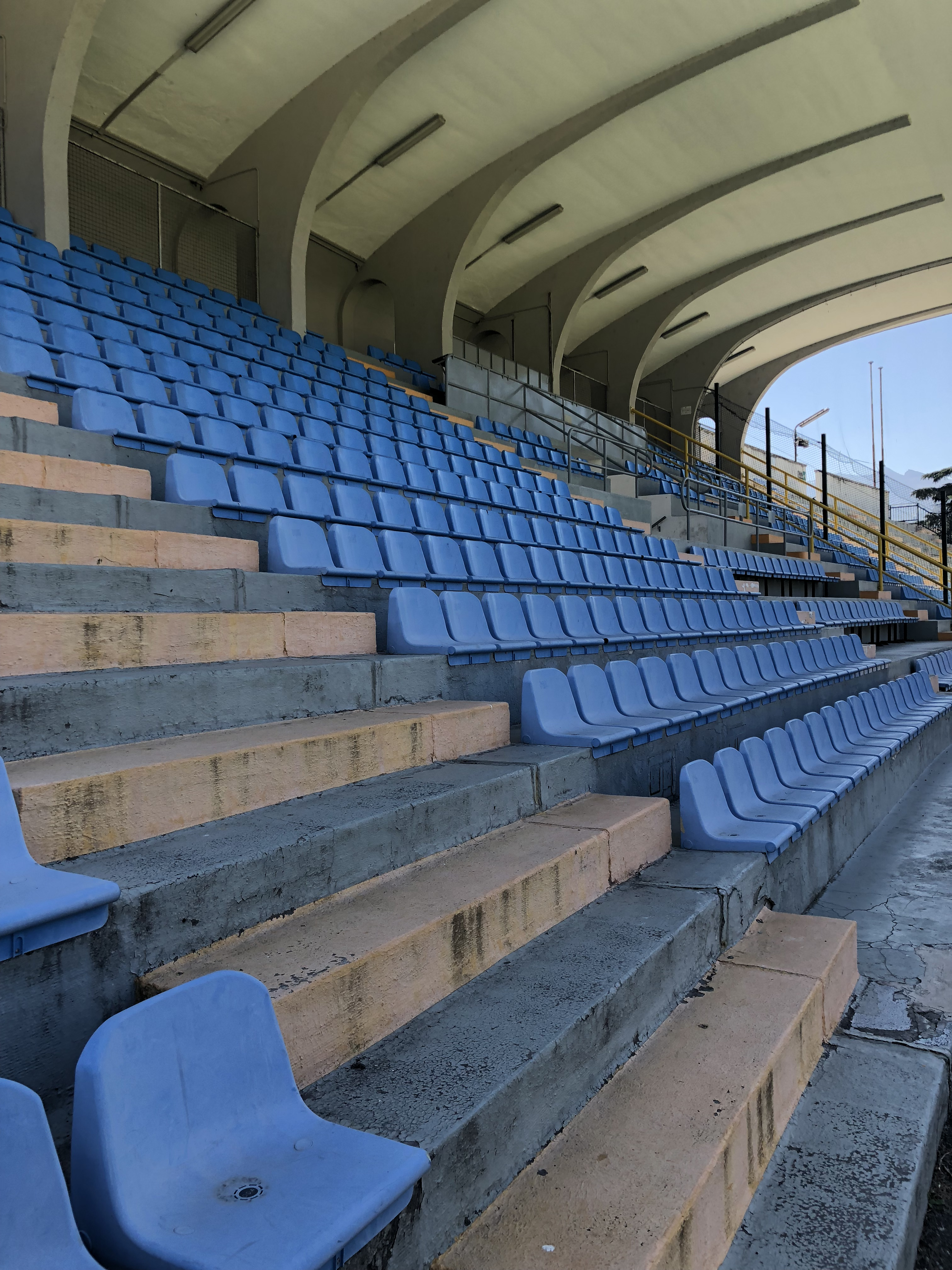
Stadio Mario Puchoz

== Memorials ==
- The city of Aosta named its stadium after Mario Puchoz.
- The city of Courmayeur has a street named after Puchoz "Via Mario Puchoz".
- The city of Rapallo has a street named after Puchoz.
- The city of Tempio Pausania has a street named after Puchoz.
- On Etna, there was a refuge dedicated to Mario Puchoz, located at 1,815 m, which was destroyed by the earthquakes that accompanied the volcanic eruption of 1975.
- Also on Etna, next to where the refuge stood, after the reconstruction of the ski lift facilities following the 2002 eruption, a chairlift was named after Puchoz.
