= Italia K2 =

Italian documentary

Italia K2 is an Italian documentary by Marcello Baldi, released in 1955.

The film documents the 1954 Italian expedition to K2, led by Ardito Desio, which saw the conquest of the K2 summit for the first time by Achille Compagnoni and Lino Lacedelli.

The film is divided into three parts: the preparation of the expedition in Italy, the approach to the K2 base camp in Pakistan, and the climb to the summit. Baldi oversaw the filming of the sequences filmed in Italy, while the filming in Pakistan was handled by Mario Fantin. Compared to similar works created by other expeditions of the time, Italia K2 presents the novelty of also showing shots taken from the summit; these shots were carried out by Compagnoni and Lacedelli themselves.

According to Morandini, the film shows images of a touching sobriety, which contrast with the emphasis of the commentary, which followed the general tone of INCOM newsreels typical of the fifties.

The film was previewed on 25 March 1955 in the presence of president Luigi Einaudi and was a good success with the public, grossing 360 million lire. In 2022 the Cineteca di Bologna redistributed it in a restored edition. The new edition includes only the sequences created by Fantin; the original music was preserved, while both the part relating to the preparations in Italy and the rhetorical commentary of the time were eliminated, replaced by captions based on Fantin's notes.
