= Lino Lacedelli =

Italian mountaineer (1925–2009)

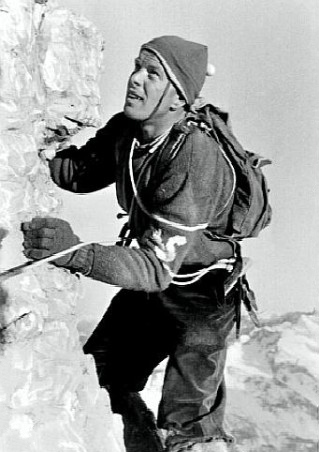
- Lino Lacedelli in 1954

Personal information
- Nationality: Italian
- Born: December 4, 1925 Cortina d'Ampezzo
- Died: November 20, 2009 (aged 83) Cortina d'Ampezzo

Climbing career
- Type of climber: Mountaineer
- First ascents: K2

Lino Lacedelli (4 December 1925 – 20 November 2009) was an Italian mountaineer. Together with Achille Compagnoni, on 31 July 1954 he was the first to reach the summit of K2.

== Early life ==
Lacedelli was born in Cortina d'Ampezzo. His climbing career began as a young teenager when he followed a mountain guide up a local summit. He soon came under the tutelage of Luigi 'Bibi' Ghedina, one of the best Dolomite rock climbers of the age. In 1946 he was accepted into the prestigious Cortina Squirrels club. Lacedelli was known for fast ascents of difficult routes, including: the Constantini-Apollonio South Face Direct (500 m V+ A2) on the Pilastro di Rozes (repeat with Ghedina); the first ascent of the Southwest Face of Cima Scotoni (Fanis Group) with Guido Lorenzi; first one-day ascent of the Solda Route on the SW Face of the Marmolada di Penia (with Lorenzi); and the fourth ascent of the Gabriel-Livanos Diedre on the Cima su Alto with Beniamino Franceschi.

In 1951, he achieved international recognition by completing, in the Mont Blanc massif, the second ascent of the Bonatti-Ghigo on the east face of the Grand Capucin with Bibi Ghendina in 18-hours, just weeks after the four-day first ascent. Despite his claims, Lino Lacedelli never made the second ascent of the Bonatti-Ghigo road on the Grand Capuchin. The team formed by Robert Paragot and Lucien Berardini made the second climb in 1953. The French mountaineers did not find the equipment supposedly left in place by the repeaters - Lacedelli and Ghedina - to abseil.

He became an obvious choice for the 1954 Italian Karakoram expedition to K2 led by Ardito Desio.

== K2 ==
With the older and more experienced Achille Compagnoni, Lacedelli was selected for the summit team. They reached the summit to claim the first ascent via the Abruzzi Ridge on 31 July 1954. The summit was not reached again until 1977.

== After K2 ==
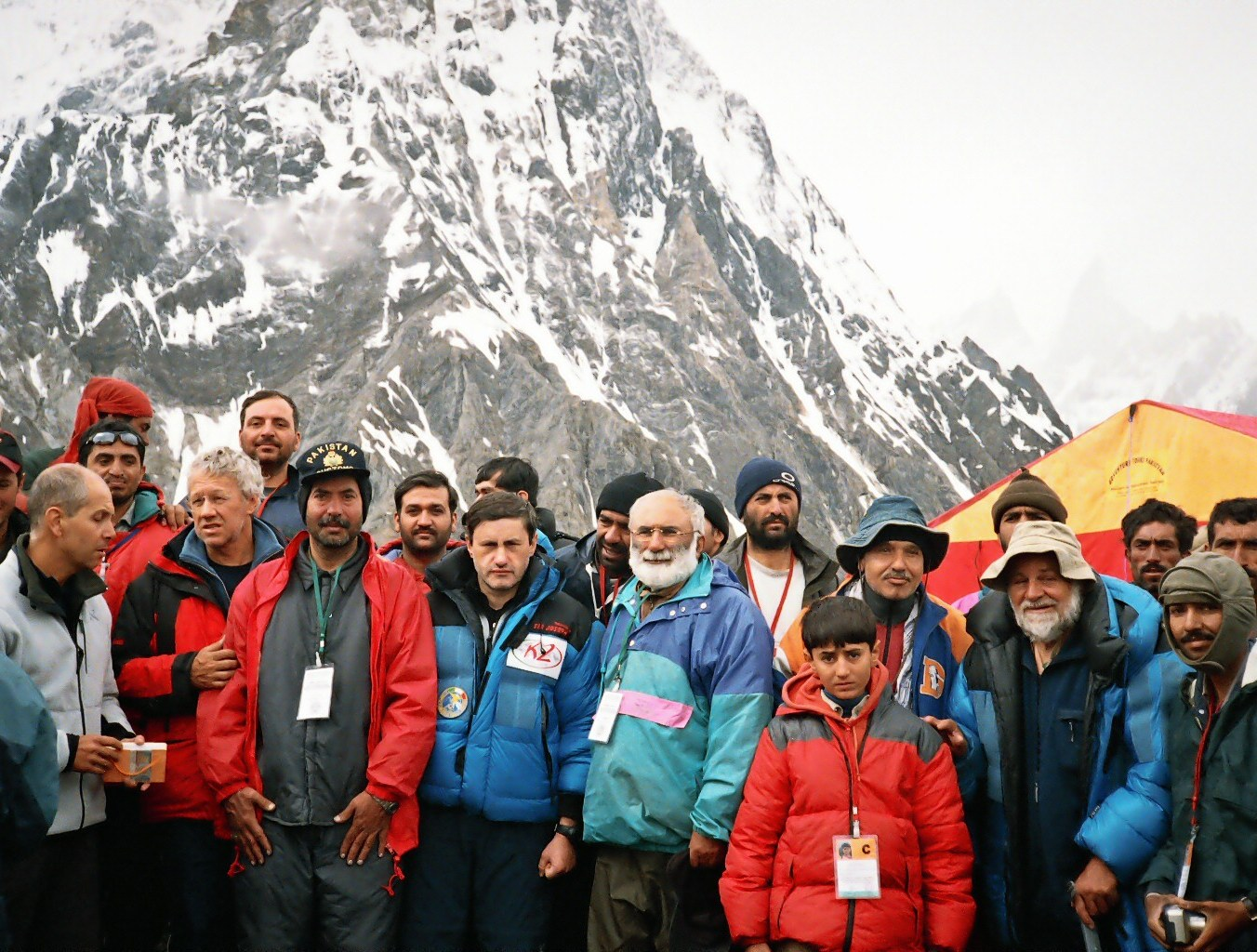
Group of Chiltan Adventurers Association Balochistan with Lino Lacedelli and Gianni Alemanno at Concordia base camp 2004

Lacedelli ran the outdoor shop K2 Sports in Cortina, trekked to K2 Base Camp in 2004. In 2005, he was awarded Italy's highest honour, Knight of the Grand Cross. He died at age 83 on 20 November 2009 in Cortina d'Ampezzo, in the house he had lived his entire life.

== K2 controversy ==
While Lino Lacedelli and Achille Compagnoni were celebrated as national heroes, Walter Bonatti accused Lacedelli and Compagnoni of having abandoned him and Amir Mehdi to an open bivouac just below high camp. In 1954, Bonatti was an ambitious 24-year-old member of the expedition. Bonatti and local porter Amir Mehdi were carrying spare oxygen bottles up to Lacedelli and Compagnoni for a summit push from Camp IX, the final camp. The high camp was further away than Bonatti and Mehdi had expected and night fell before they reached it. Bonatti and Mehdi survived a bivouac at 8100 m, but Mehdi lost all toes on both feet to frostbite.

Back at home, the summit team not only denied all charges, but Compagnoni counter-attacked Bonatti, accusing him of trying to sabotage their summit push and steal the top for himself. Bonatti, who made the first ascent of Gasherbrum IV in 1958, was ostracised from the climbing community and in 1965 gave up mountaineering.

In 1995, Bonatti published The Mountains of My Life, an autobiography with stories about the expedition of 1954. Bonatti displays proof of his innocence, including a photograph of Lacedelli and Compagnoni wearing oxygen masks on the summit.

== Lacedelli speaks up ==
Lacedelli remained silent about the K2 events until 2004, when he published his book K2: The Price of Conquest. He wrote that on the night before the first ascent of K2, Bonatti and Mehdi had to endure a freezing, storm-swept bivouac high on the Shoulder of K2, while their companions Achille Compagnoni and Lino Lacedelli spent the night in a tent literally within hailing distance. As agreed beforehand, Bonatti and Mehdi had carried the oxygen bottles for the summit team who were waiting for them in Camp IX. But the top camp was placed in a higher location than Bonatti had expected, and when they couldn’t find the tent, they were forced to bivouac at 8100 meters.

Ten years after the ascent, mountaineering journalist Nino Giglio published newspaper articles based on interviews with Compagnoni and the expedition’s Pakistani liaison officer Colonel Ata-Ullah. It was claimed that Bonatti had tried to beat Lacedelli and Compagnoni to the summit, that he used oxygen during his bivouac that caused the summiteers supply to run out early, and that Bonatti had deserted Mehdi and so was responsible for his frostbite and subsequent amputations. These accusations prompted Bonatti to file and win a libel suit against Giglio and the newspaper (the damages were donated to an orphanage). Bonatti easily proved that he couldn’t have used the oxygen, as he didn’t have the masks or tubing, just the bottles. One aspect of the libel case was embarrassing to Bonatti: his lawyer tracked down Amir Mehdi in Hunza, bringing him to Gilgit District Court for deposition. Mehdi was asked about the bivouac and his testimony supported at least one of Compagnoni's assertions – Bonatti had been scheming to supplant Compagnoni on the summit team, and had promised Mehdi they would spend the night in Camp 9's tent and continue to the summit, regardless of Compagnoni's objections. Bonatti wanted to try to summit K2 without the use of supplemental oxygen. However, Mehdi denied that Bonatti abandoned him or used the summit team's oxygen. He also believed that if they had used oxygen during the bivouac, he could have saved his toes.
