= Achille Compagnoni =

Italian mountaineer and skier (1914–2009)

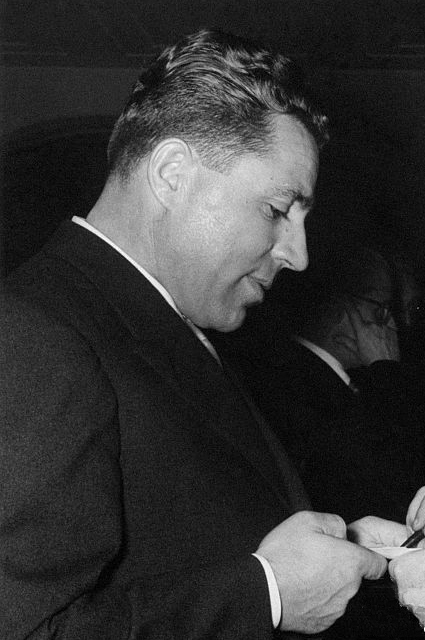
- Compagnoni at the world premiere of Italia K2 on 25 March 1955

Personal information
- Born: 26 September 1914 Santa Caterina di Valfurva, Italy
- Died: 13 May 2009 (aged 94) Aosta, Italy

Sport
- Sport: Skiing

Achille Compagnoni (26 September 1914 – 13 May 2009) was an Italian mountaineer and skier. Together with Lino Lacedelli on 31 July 1954 he was in the first party to reach the summit of K2.

== Biography ==
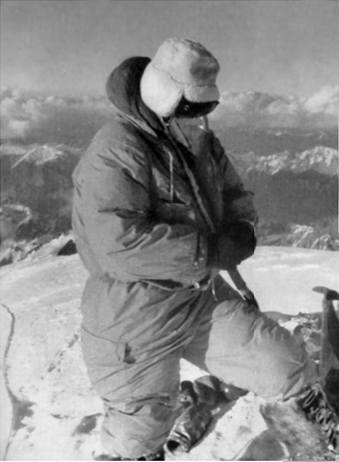
Compagnoni on the summit of K2 on 31 July 1954

Compagnoni was born in Santa Caterina di Valfurva, Sondrio, Lombardy.

On the successful K2 expedition, Compagnoni's decision to place the final camp (IX) at a higher location than formerly agreed was a source of controversy. Compagnoni alleged that Walter Bonatti had used some of the oxygen supply intended for the summit, causing it to run out on summit day. Walter Bonatti disputed this, and was cleared in the Italian courts in 1964.

Bonatti and a Hunza climber, Amir Mehdi, climbed up to deliver oxygen to Compagnoni and Lacedeilli for their summit attempt. It was an epic climb with the weight of the oxygen bottles at that altitude and both men were exhausted. Bonatti and Mehdi arrived in failing light at a point on the "shoulder" at 7,900 metres (26,000 ft) where the team had agreed to place camp IX. To their surprise the camp was not there. Alarmed, Bonatti and Mehdi called out to Compagnoni and Lacedelli who eventually answered from a site further up and left on the mountain, instructing Bonatti to leave the bottles and descend down the mountain. Bonatti could see the headlamp shining from the site over a difficult traverse in the dark, 600 ft away. Bonatti pleaded with Compagnoni and Lacedelli to join them in the camp. The headlamp abruptly switched off and despite continued pleas from Bonatti and Mehdi, Compagnoni and Lacedelli remained silent, sentencing Bonatti and Mehdi to an unplanned bivouac at 7,900 metres (26,000 ft) in the open.

Bonatti assessed that Mehdi was not in a fit state to downclimb safely at night. He stayed on the "shoulder" with Mehdi battling snow drifts and the cold all night. It cost Mehdi his toes. Compagnoni explained his decision to move the tent was to avoid an overhanging serac. However his motive actually was to prevent Walter Bonatti from reaching the camp and hence join the summit team in an attempt. Bonatti was easily in the best physical condition of all the climbers and the logical choice to make the summit attempt. If he had joined the summit team, he would likely have done so without the use of supplemental oxygen. If he had succeeded, any summit by Compagnoni would have been eclipsed. Compagnoni intended to discourage Bonatti from reaching the tent.

At 18:10 the next evening, Compagnoni and Lino Lacedelli reached the summit of K2, using the supplemental oxygen Bonatti and Mehdi had brought them. Expedition leader Ardito Desio, in his final report, mentioned the forced bivouac only in passing. Mehdi's frostbite was an embarrassment to the expedition. The Italian government provided Mehdi with a small pension for his contribution and sacrifice on the first ascent of K2. This is disputed by Mehdi's son.

In 2004, Lino Lacedelli confirmed Bonatti's version of events in his book, K2. Il prezzo della conquista (see also his interview in National Geographical Magazine in an article on Bonatti). In 2006 an English translation appeared, K2: The Price of Conquest. In 2008, the Club Alpino Italiano officially recognized Bonatti's version of these events. Walter Bonatti never reconciled with Compagnoni.

Achille Compagnoni died aged 94 in Aosta on 13 May 2009.

== Skiing ==
During his service with the Alpini corps of the Italian army, he participated together with Lieutenant Giuseppe Lamberti and Sergeant Ettore Schranz in the fourth edition of the legendary Trofeo Mezzalama, when their team placed second.

Further notable results were:

- 1939: 2nd, Italian men's championships of cross-country skiing, 50 km
- 1940: 1st, Italian men's championships of cross-country skiing, 36 km
- 1941: 3rd, Italian men's championships of cross-country skiing, 50 km
- 1942: 3rd, Italian men's championships of cross-country skiing, 18 km

== Italian orders of merit ==
1st Class / Knight Grand Cross: Cavaliere di Gran Croce Ordine al Merito della Repubblica Italiana (8,362)

== Bibliography ==
- Uomini sul K2, Achille Compagnoni, 1958, Veronelli Editore, Milano IT.
- Il Tricolore sul K2, Achille Compagnoni, 1958, Veronelli Editore, Milano IT.
- The Mountains of My Life, Walter Bonatti.
- K2. Storia di un caso, Walter Bonatti.
- K2. La verità. 1954–2004, Walter Bonatti, 2005, Baldini Castoldi Dalai editore. ISBN 88-8490-845-0.
- K2. Il prezzo della conquista, Lino Lacedelli and Giovanni Cenacchi, 2004, Mondadori, IT. ISBN 978-88-04-53556-0
- K2: The Price of Conquest, Lino Lacedelli and Giovanni Cenacchi, 2006, Carreg Ltd. UK. ISBN 0-9538631-3-1.
- K2. Lies and Treachery, Robert Marshall, 2009, Carreg Ltd. UK. ISBN 978-0-9538631-7-4.
