= Amir Mehdi =

Pakistani mountaineer and porter (1913–1999)

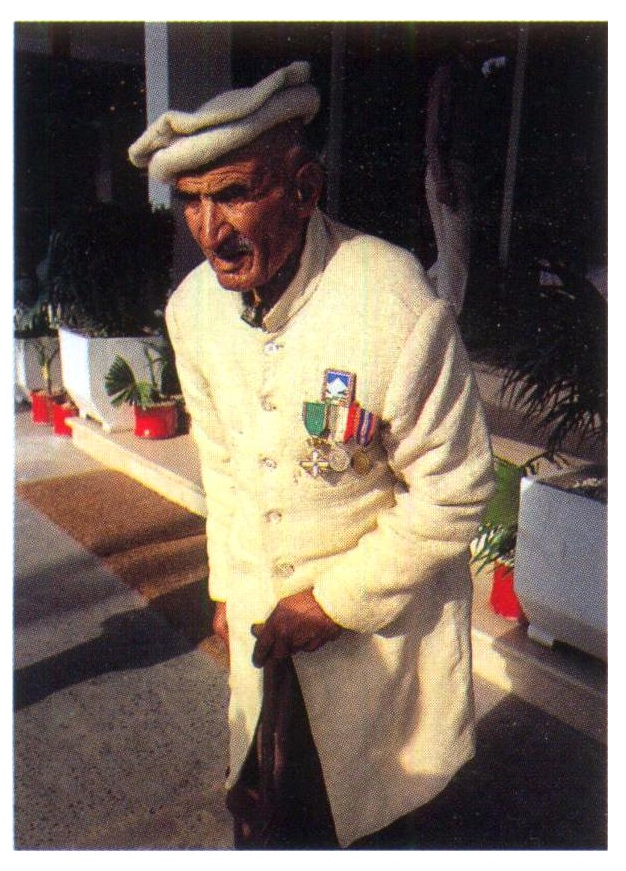
- Amir Mehdi

Personal information
- Nationality: Pakistani
- Born: 1913
- Died: 1999 (aged 85–86)

Climbing career
- Type of climber: Mountaineer
- First ascents: Nanga Parbat
- Major ascents: K2 first ascent
- Known for: 1954 Italian Karakoram expedition to K2

Amir Mehdi (sometimes spelled Amir Mahdi, and also known as Hunza Mehdi; 1913–1999) was a Pakistani mountaineer and porter known for being part of the team which made the first successful ascent of Nanga Parbat in 1953, and of K2 in 1954 with an Italian expedition. He, along with the Italian mountaineer Walter Bonatti, are also known for having survived a night at the highest open bivouac - 8,100 metres (26,600 ft) - on K2 in 1954.

== Nanga Parbat (1953) ==
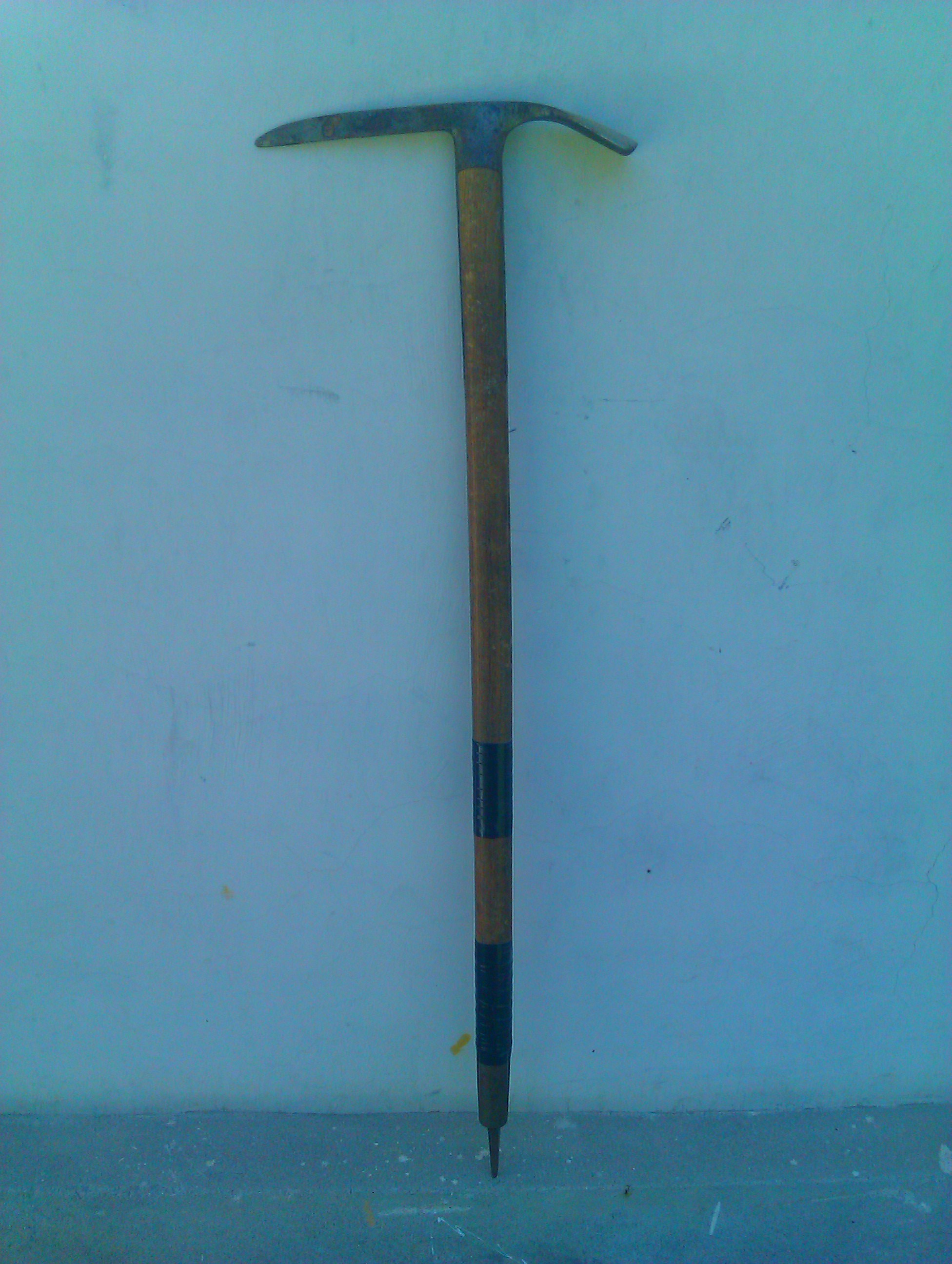
Ice Axe used by Amir Mehdi, during 1954's K2 ascent

In July 1953 a German-Austrian team embarked on an expedition to Nanga Parbat. The expedition was organized by the half-brother of Willy Merkl, Karl Herrligkoffer from Munich, while the expedition leader was Peter Aschenbrenner from Innsbruck, who had participated in the 1932 and 1934 attempts. Hermann Buhl, one of the european team members, made it to the top and became the first person to reach the summit. He was assisted by two high altitude porters from Hunza, Amir Mehdi and Haji Baig. They later helped Buhl during his descent, when he was caught by frostbite and lost his crampon.

== K2 (1954) ==
During the Italian expedition, Amir Mehdi and Walter Bonatti were stranded by Achille Compagnoni and Lino Lacedelli, who wanted to prevent Bonatti from reaching the summit, and were forced to huddle on an ice ledge overnight at 8,100 metres (26,600 ft), the highest ever open bivouac at the time. As Mehdi was wearing standard army boots, he lost all his toes to frostbite and spent 8 months in hospital recovering from the ordeal.

It was later revealed that Compagnoni had deliberately moved the camp because he wanted to prevent Bonatti and Mehdi from joining the summit bid. Compagnoni apparently feared that Bonatti, who was younger and fitter, was going to steal the limelight, perhaps by climbing without supplemental oxygen. Compagnoni intended for Mehdi and Bonatti to see that the bivouac tent was out of reach, and return to a lower camp, but night fell, and Mehdi was in no condition to climb back down, so the two had to dig into snow for shelter.

Unlike his Italian colleagues, Mehdi hadn't been given proper high-altitude snow boots. He was wearing regular army boots - according to some reports, they were two sizes too small for him. He developed severe frostbite, and was unable to walk by the time he reached base camp. He had to be carried on a stretcher to a hospital in the town of Skardu, where he was given first aid, and transferred from there to a military hospital in Rawalpindi. Doctors had no choice but to amputate all his toes to prevent gangrene from spreading. He was not released from the hospital until eight months later.

When he finally returned home to his village in Hunza, Mehdi put away his ice axe and told his family he never wanted to see it again.

== Life and career ==
Mehdi left mountaineering after the K2 attempt. The Italian government claimed it awarded him a pension, but his son denied this. Amir served briefly as a government servant of Pakistan, before living out the rest of his modest life in his hometown Hassanabad.

Mehdi died of old age in 1999, in Hunza.

== Awards and titles ==
- The Italian government awarded him the rank of cavaliere.
- Mehdi also received the Italian civilian medal, Al Valor Civile.
- Mehdi was given the title of 'Hunza Tiger' for the services rendered during the ascent of Nanga Parbat in 1953.

== See also ==
- Nazir Sabir
- Ashraf Aman
- Samina Baig
- Meherban Karim
- Hunza Valley
