= Art Gilkey =

American geologist and mountaineer (1926–1953)

Arthur Karr Gilkey
- Born: September 25, 1926; Colorado, US
- Died: August 10, 1953 (aged 26); K2

Arthur Karr Gilkey (September 25, 1926 – August 10, 1953) was an American geologist and mountaineer.

He was born in Boulder, Colorado, to Herbert J. Gilkey (1890–1976) and Mildred (Talbot) Gilkey, and was raised in Ames, Iowa, where his father was a professor of Engineering. He earned a Bachelor's of Science degree from Iowa State University in 1949 after a tour of duty in the Navy during World War II, and began graduate study in Geology at Columbia University, where he earned a Master of Science degree in 1950. Prior to his death, Gilkey had completed his doctoral dissertation, “Fracture Pattern of the Zuni Uplift,” and was posthumously awarded a Ph.D. His thesis advisor was Walter H. Bucher. An article Gilkey wrote with Arie Poldervaart was published posthumously.

Gilkey explored Alaska in 1950 and 1952. He died during the 1953 American expedition to summit K2. At Camp III, he came down with thrombophlebitis (blood clots in the leg) or possibly deep venous thrombosis, followed by pulmonary embolism. His fellow expedition members, including Charles Houston and Pete Schoening, immediately turned back in an attempt to save his life. During the descent, Gilkey, wrapped in a sleeping bag, suddenly disappeared. It is believed he was swept away by an avalanche, but others conjecture that he released himself from the ropes to spare his teammates from further risk on his behalf. Gilkey's remains were discovered in 1993, melting out of the glacier at the base of K2's south face.

== See also ==
- List of solved missing person cases (1950–1969)

== Memorials ==
- The Gilkey Memorial to deceased climbers, situated below K2, was originally built for, and named after, Art Gilkey.
- The American Alpine Club administers the Arthur K. Gilkey Memorial Award, providing grants in aid of scientific research in alpine areas.
