= The Mountains of My Life =

1995 book by Walter Bonatti

- Author: Walter Bonatti
- Original title: Montagne di una vita
- Language: Italian
- Publisher: Baldini & Castoldi
- Publication date: 1995
- Publication place: Italy
- English publication date: 2001
- Pages: 335
- ISBN: 8880890301

The Mountains of My Life (Italian: Montagne di una vita) is a 1995 book by the Italian mountaineer Walter Bonatti. It is a collection of texts where Bonatti recounts his experiences of expedition climbing and alpine climbing over several continents. It includes his account of the 1954 Italian expedition to K2 and its associated controversy.
