= Gilkey Memorial =

Memorial in Pakistan

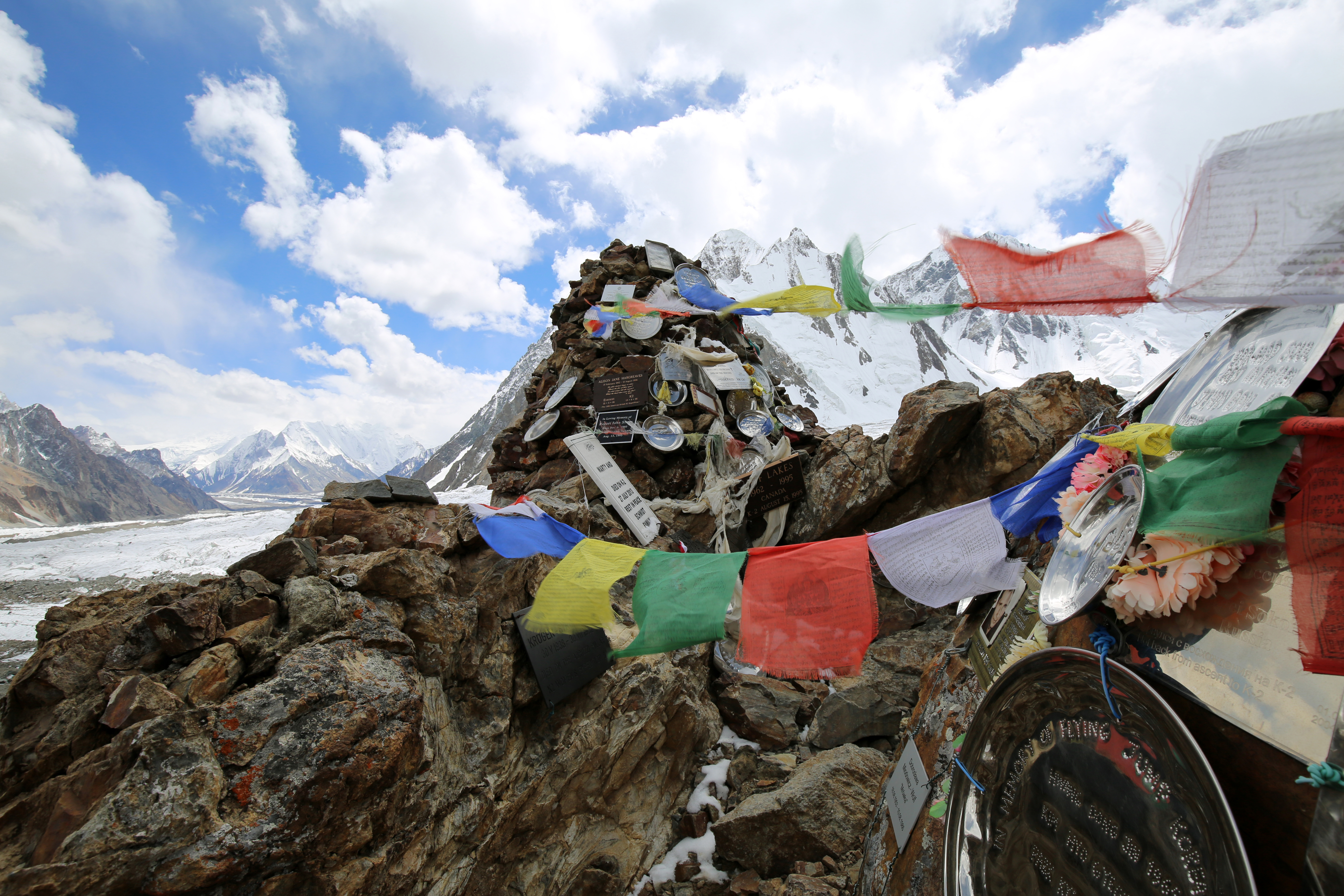
Gilkey Memorial in 2019

The Gilkey Memorial is a memorial and cenotaph for those who have died while climbing K2. The memorial is named after Art Gilkey who died on the mountain in 1953.

The memorial is a stone cairn covered with metal plaques. Each plaque is inscribed with details about the dead climber, such as when they went missing or were found dead.

A plaque was added for Dudley Wolfe, the American climber who died on the mountain during the 1939 American expedition after his remains were found in 2002.
