= Ardito Desio =

Italian geologist, mountaineer and cartographer (1897–2001)

Count Ardito Desio
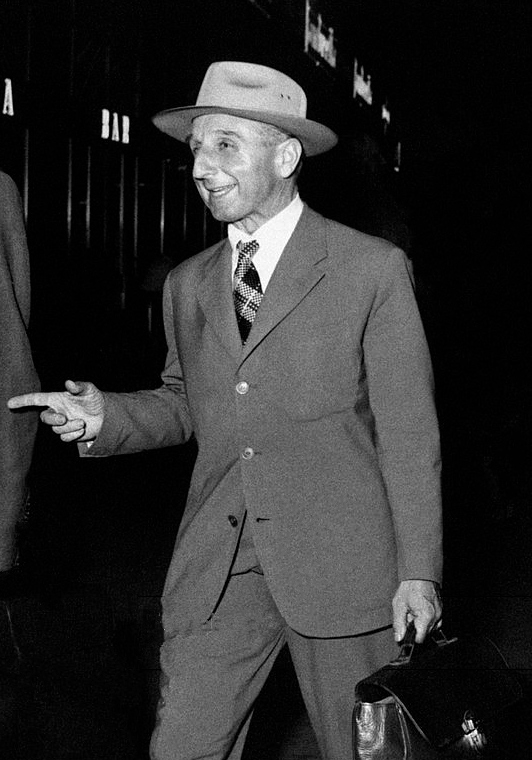
- Ardito Desio in 1955
- Born: 18 April 1897; Palmanova, Friuli, Italy
- Died: 12 December 2001 (aged 104); Rome, Italy
- Education: University of Florence
- Occupations: Glaciologist, Geologist, Mountaineer, Geographer
- Employer: University of Milan
- Organization: Geological Committee of Italy
- Known for: First ascent of K2
- Honours: Department of Earth Sciences Ardito Desio (DiSTAD), University of Milan

Count Ardito Desio (18 April 1897 – 12 December 2001) was an Italian explorer, mountain climber, geologist, and cartographer.

== Early life ==
Desio was born in Palmanova, Friuli, Italy. He attended the Middle Schools of Udine and Cividale and the University of Florence (1916–1920), graduating with a degree in Natural Sciences (Geology). During the First World War, he served in the military corps of the alpini and was captured by the Austrians on Mount Pasubio. He made advanced studies in Geology at the same University from 1921 to 1923, and was also an assistant in that matter at that university, as well as in those of Pavia (1923–1924) and Milan (1924–1927). He was a lecturer in Physical Geography, Geology and Paleontology (1928–1931), Professor of Geology at the University of Milan, and Applied Geology at the Engineering School of Milan (a position he held from 1932 to 1972). Concurrent to these positions, he served as a consultant geologist for the Edison Company for hydroelectric plants in Italy, Spain, Switzerland, Greece, Turkey and Brazil, and the same capacity for the Public Power Corporation of Greece. In 1973 he became Professor Emeritus at the University of Milan.

== Exploration of mountains in Europe ==
Desio began geological investigations into certain areas of the Alps and Apennines in 1920. The following year, he made some exploratory trips to the Dodecanese Islands. He published a volume on the geology of that archipelago in the Italian Geological Survey.

== Exploration of mountains in Africa ==
In 1926, Desio organized and led a geographical and geological expedition to the Oasis of Jaghbub, in the Libyan Desert. The scientific results of these investigations are published in four volumes by the Royal Geographical Society of Italy, the organization that sponsored the expedition.

From 1930 to 1933 he led some geological and geographical expeditions through the hinterland of Libya, including the crossing of the Sahara desert with a large caravan of camels from the Mediterranean seaboard as far as the frontier of Sudan and back through Fezzan, across the Libyan Sahara (summer 1931). The report of this expedition was also published in four volumes.

In 1935 and 1936 he further explored the Fezzan, from both the geological and hydrological point of view, and the Tibesti massif in the Central Sahara. From 1936 to 1940, he organized and directed the Libyan Geological Survey, which included research into mining and artesian waters by order of the Government of Libya. Desio discovered in 1938 natural oil in the subsurface of Libya. In the same years, he also discovered an exploitable deposit of Carnallite in the Oasis of Marada, and rich artesian aquifers in some zones of Northern Libya, which gave a strong impulse to the development of the agriculture. However, further exploration in this region was halted by the outbreak of World War II.

During the winters of 1937 and 1938, Desio explored Wallega and the Benishangul-Gumuz Region in Eastern Ethiopia, both from the point of view of the geology and mining, discovering some new deposits of gold and molybdenite.

In 1940 he organized and directed an expedition to Tibesti, employing automobiles and aircraft. The scientific reports were published in a volume by the Royal Geographical Society of Italy. In the same year, he organized and directed a mining exploration in Northern Albania.

== Exploration of mountains in Asia ==
In 1929 he was a member of the Italian Geographical Expedition to Karakoram, under the leadership of the Duke of Spoleto, in the capacity of geographer and geologist. On this occasion, he covered Kashmir and Baltistan in Northern Pakistan, and developed his scientific activity in the valleys of Baltoro and Panmah glaciers on the south slope of the range, and in the Sarpo Laggo and Shaksgam valleys, between the Karakorum and the Aghil ranges, the Abruzzi valley climbing, for the first time, the Conway Pass. The results of this expedition are contained in a volume, which was published under the aegis of the Royal Geographical Society and the Italian Alpine Club in 1936.

During the summer of 1933, Desio led an expedition to Iran. The expedition climbed some of the highest peaks of the Zagros Range including the development of a new route to the summit of Iran's highest peak, Mount Damāvand (5,610 m). He published some scientific reports on this trip.

=== First ascent of K2 ===
From 1952 to 1955, he led 3 expeditions to the Karakorum Range and Hindu Kush. The first was a preliminary expedition; the second, the main expedition for the first ascent of K2 (8,611 m, the second highest peak in the world); the third, for geological, geophysical and ethnographical researches. The results of the studies carried out during these expeditions have been published in many papers and more largely developed in 8 volumes of scientific character.

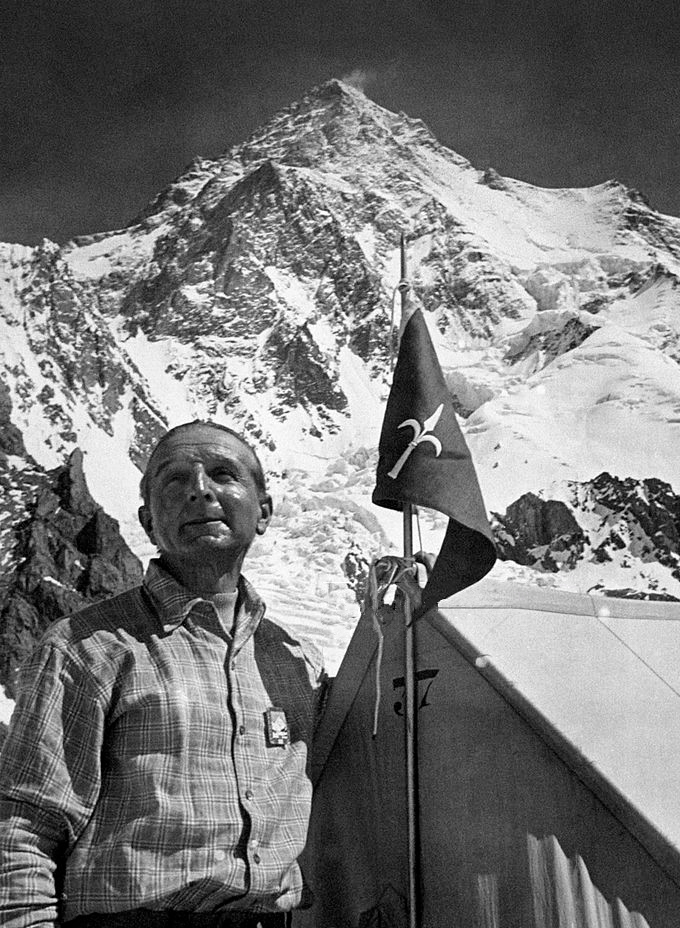
Ardito Desio at K2 in 1954

=== Later expeditions ===
During the summer of 1961, he led an expedition to Badakhshan and Katagan (North¬eastern Afghanistan) with a geological and geophysical program, and in the summer of 1962 he led another expedition to the Karakorum Range, exploring geologically the upper Hunza valley and the Chogo Lumba, the Basha and the Hoh Lumba glacier valleys.

In 1967 and 1968 he carried out geohydrological investigations in the Mu River basin (Central Burma) for a UN irrigation project, while in 1970 he developed a geological study in Mindanao (Philippines).

In northern Pakistan Desio carried out three other geological expeditions during the summers of 1971 (Middle Indus Valley), 1973 (Gilgit-Skardu) and 1975 (Punjab and Gilgit).

By invitation of Academia Sinica, in June 1980, after a scientific symposium in Beijing, Desio crossed Southern Tibet with a team of Chinese scientists.

In 1989 he planned, organized and realized a permanent high-altitude scientific laboratory-observatory in a prefabricated glass and aluminum pyramid-shaped structure, which was installed at an altitude of 5,050 m at the base of Mount Everest. The aim was to grant multidisciplinary scientific investigations at high quotient. The "Pyramid" is still in existence and the laboratory still works.

== Exploration of mountains in Antarctica ==
In 1961, he was invited by the National Science Foundation to visit Antarctica, particularly the stations of McMurdo, Byrd and Amundsen-Scott at the South Pole, and the Wright Valley, one of the Dry Valleys (Victoria Land).

== Membership and titles ==
Desio was President of the Geological Committee of Italy, of the Geological Society and is honorary President of the Paleontology Society, of the National Association of Italian Geologists. He was the first president of the Italian Order of Geologists.

Desio was a member of the Italian National Academy of Lincei. He was awarded an honorary degree in Geological Sciences by the University of Urbino in 1985.

== Final years ==
He spent his last four years in Rome, where he died in December 2001, aged 104. He is buried in Palmanova, his native town.

In 1982, the University of Milan named its Department of Earth Sciences after Desio. The Department of Earth Sciences Ardito Desio (DiSTAD) was opened on 1 November 1982 after merging the Institutes of Geology and Palaeontology, the Institute of Mineralogy, Petrography and Ore Deposits, and the Institute of Geophysics together.
