= Sport in Italy =

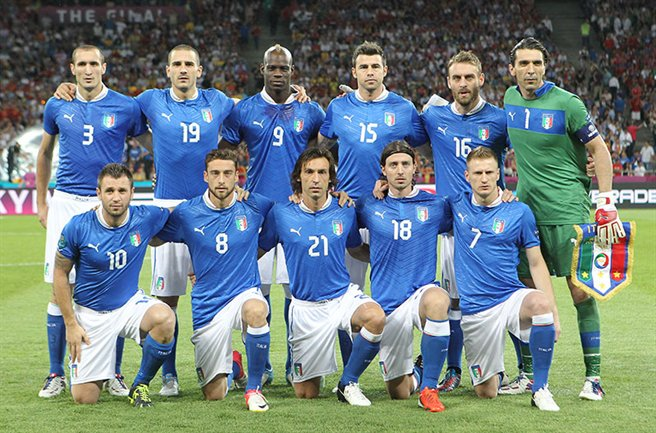
The Italy national football team in 2012. Football is the most popular sport in Italy.

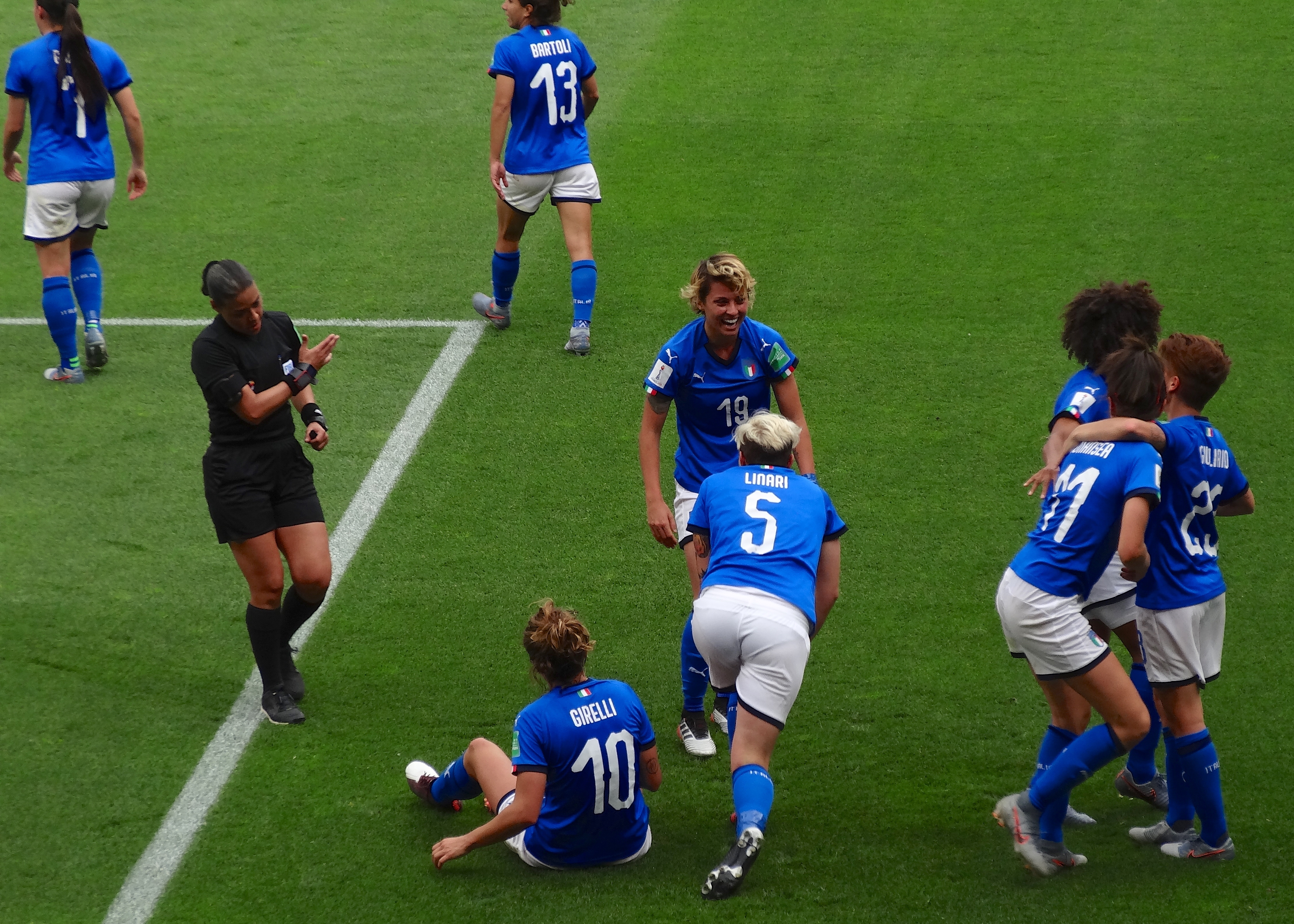
Italy during 2019 FIFA Women's World Cup match against Australia.

Sport in Italy has a long tradition. In several sports, both individual and team, Italy has good representation and many successes. The most popular sport in Italy is football. Italy's national football team is one of the world's most successful teams with four FIFA World Cup victories (1934, 1938, 1982 and 2006) and two UEFA Euro victories (1968 and 2021). Italian clubs have won 48 major European trophies, making Italy the second most successful country in European football. Italy's top-flight club football league is named Serie A and is followed by millions of fans around the world.

Other popular team sports in Italy include basketball, volleyball and rugby. Italy's male and female national volleyball teams are often featured among the world's best. The Italian national basketball team's best results were gold at Eurobasket 1983 and EuroBasket 1999, as well as silver at the Olympics in 1980 and 2004. Lega Basket Serie A is widely considered one of the most competitive in Europe. Italy's rugby national team competes in the Six Nations Championship, and is a regular at the Rugby World Cup. The men's volleyball team won three consecutive World Championships (in 1990, 1994, and 1998) and earned the Olympic silver medal in 1996, 2004, and 2016.

Italy has a long and successful tradition in individual sports as well. Bicycle racing is a familiar sport in the country along with fencing, shooting and boxing. Alpine skiing is also a widespread sport in Italy, and the country is a popular international skiing destination, known for its ski resorts. Italian skiers achieved good results in Winter Olympic Games, Alpine Ski World Cup, and tennis has a significant following in Italy, ranking as the fourth most practised sport in the country. Motorsports are also extremely popular in Italy. Italy has won, by far, the most MotoGP World Championships. Italian Scuderia Ferrari is the oldest surviving team in Grand Prix racing, having competed since 1948, and statistically the most successful Formula One team in history.

Historically, Italy has been successful in the Olympic Games, taking part from the first Olympiad and in 47 Games out of 48, not having officially participated in the 1904 Summer Olympics. Italian sportsmen have won 618 medals at the Summer Olympic Games, and another 141 at the Winter Olympic Games, for a combined total of 759 medals with 259 golds, which makes them the sixth most successful nation in Olympic history for total medals. The country hosted two Winter Olympics and will host a third (in 1956, 2006, and 2026), and one Summer games (in 1960).

== Participation by sport ==
This list, published by Italian National Olympic Committee, refers to a survey made by National Institute of Statistics (Italy) in 2000.

#	Sport	Participants	National teams	Details
1	Football (including futsal)	4,363,000	Football; Futsal	Football in Italy
2	Water sports	3,480,000	Swimming; Diving; Water polo	
3	Gymnastics (including physical education)	2,204,000		
4	Skiing	2,060,000		
5	Cycling	1,321,000	Cycling	
6	Tennis	1,298,000	Davis Cup team Fed Cup team	Tennis in Italy
7	Volleyball (including beach volleyball)	999,000	Volleyball (men); Volleyball (women)	
8	Athletics (including road running)	995,000	Athletics	Athletics in Italy
9	Basketball	606,000	Basketball	
10	Bodybuilding (including physical fitness)	555,000		

== Major team sports ==
=== Football ===
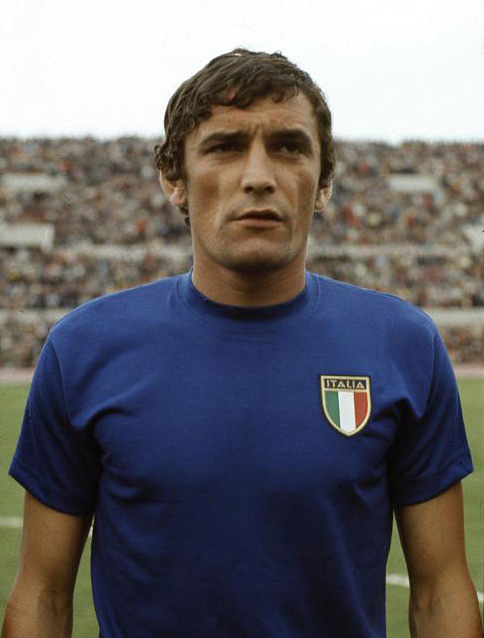
Gigi Riva, with 35 goals in 42 appearances (in all official competitions) between 1965 and 1974, is Italy's all-time leading goalscorer.

Football (calcio in Italian) is the most popular sport in Italy. The Italy national football team is considered to be one of the best national teams in the world. They have won the FIFA World Cup four times (1934, 1938, 1982, 2006), trailing only Brazil (with 5), runners-up in two finals (1970, 1994) and reaching a third place (1990) and a fourth place (1978). They have also won two European Championships (1968 and 2020), also appearing in two finals (2000, 2012), finished third at the Confederations Cup (2013), won one Olympic football tournament (1936) and two Central European International Cups (1927–30 and 1933–35).

Italy's top domestic league, the Serie A, is one of the most popular professional sports leagues in the world and it is often depicted as the most tactical national football league. Serie A clubs have seen success in the Champions League (formerly the European Cup), the premier European club competition, winning it twelve times. Italy's club sides have won 48 major European trophies, making them the second most successful nation in European football. Serie A hosts three of the world's most famous clubs as Juventus, Milan and Inter, all founding members of the G-14, a group which represented the largest and most prestigious European football clubs; Serie A was the only league to produce three founding members. Juventus, Milan and Inter, along with Roma, Fiorentina, Lazio and historically Parma, but now Napoli, are known as the Seven Sisters of Italian football. The Italian word for soccer is calcio, "kick", taken from the name of Italy's traditional football games, as opposed to being adapted from the English name football or soccer, as in most other languages. Often, Italian children can be seen playing on the street with friends and relatives.

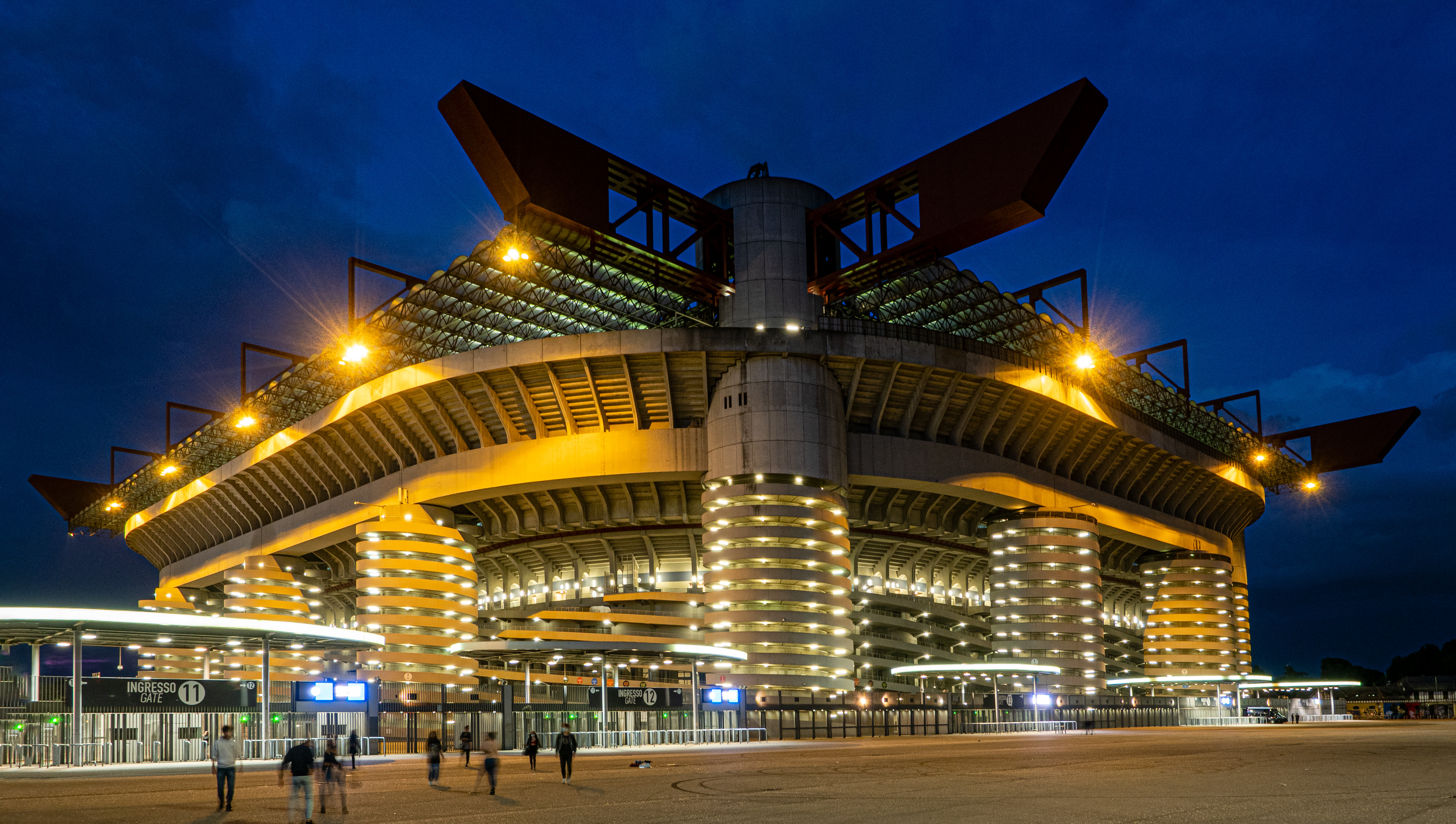
The San Siro stadium in Milan.

The history of football in Italy gives much of the explanation behind why it has remained such a popular sport today. The first record of an Italian football team goes back to 1893. This team was named FC Genoa. The sport was brought to Italy through the Romans, who used to play a very similar game called harpastum, which included two teams aiming to score on their opponents side (hands could be used along with feet). Years later, the Renaissance brought about big changes for not only the art and culture of Italy, but also for sport. Specifically, Florence was the spot where the most changes occurred. Football of the past was different from that of today as teams were much larger with 27 people. Also, the games were only 50 minutes long. Today, the games consist of two 45 minute halves. The Italy National team first began playing in 1910 in the FIFA World Cup. To the surprise of many fans, the Italy National Team did not qualify for the tournament in 2017. This was the first time in sixty years that the team did not make the World Cup after losing to Sweden. The loss was published in popular sport newspapers in Italy such as La Gazzetta dello Sport, which is one of the largest selling newspapers in Italy.

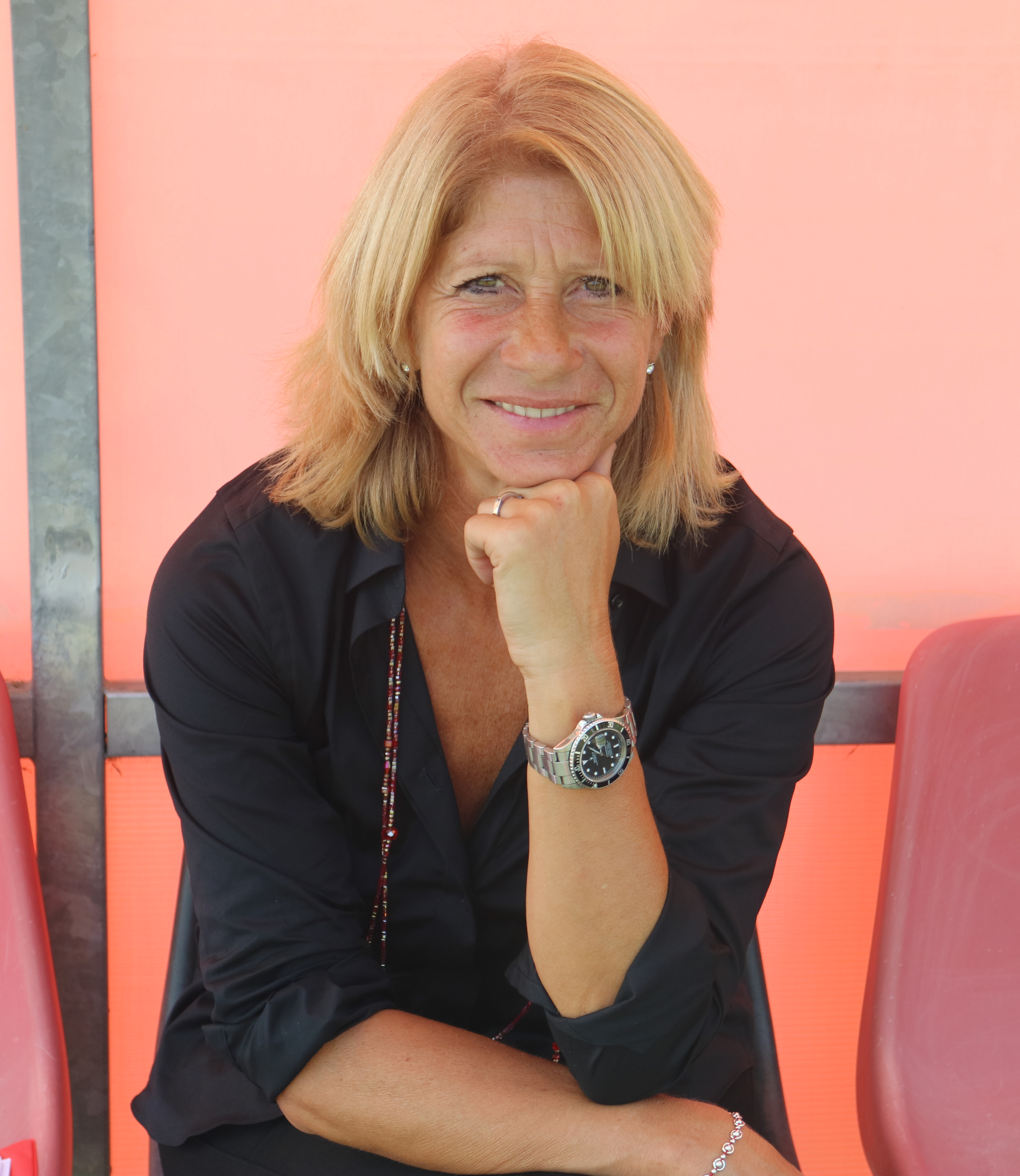
Carolina Morace legendary figure in Italian women's football, Carolina Morace was a prolific striker who played for the Italian national team and also served as their coach.

Stadiums have also become more than a place to watch a football game today. All across Italy, stadiums now include various different things such as museums, shops, and restaurants for the people attending the game to enjoy. Italian football stadiums also host other venues such as concerts, rugby matches, and field and track. Italy takes pride in their football stadiums and have some of the most well known in the world. Most Italian stadiums have stadium tours where children six and under are allowed to go for free . The city of Milan stadium, which is also known as the San Siro stadium, has the biggest seating capacity in Italy with 80,018 seats. The stadium is also known in the country as "La Scala del Calcio." It is also known as the "Giuseppe Meazza" stadium after the Italian star, Giuseppe Meazza. The San Siro stadium has hosted four UEFA Champions League finals. This stadium is where the rival teams AC Milan and Internazionale play. The two clubs meet twice a year and the matches between these two clubs are known as the Derby della Madonnina. It is called Derby della Madonnina in honour of one of the main sights in the city of Milan, the statue of the Virgin Mary on the top of the Duomo, which is often referred to as the Madonnina ("Little Madonna" in Italian). Another famous stadium in Italy is the Stadio Olimpico. This stadium is the second largest in Italy and is where the rival teams AS Roma and SS Lazio play. The two clubs meet twice a year and the matches between these two clubs are known as the Derby della Capitale (Derby of the Capital). Also, the Stadio Olimpico holds the Coppa Italia Final.

Being a football country, Italy has some all-time great players that have played for them. More players have won the coveted Ballon d'Or award while playing in Serie A than any other league in the world, except La Liga. Fabio Cannavaro played professional football from 1992 to 2011. He is among only one of three defenders to have been named FIFA's Player of the Year. Cannavaro won the award in 2006 which is the same year he also helped Italy reach the finals of the World Cup. Another one of Italy's all-time great football players was Dino Zoff. Zoff played goalie for Italy, and at 40 years old he became the oldest player to win the World Cup. Also, Dino holds the record for the longest time without giving up a goal at an international tournament with 1,142 minutes. His club play includes six Serie A titles. After retiring from playing football, Dino later became a coach. Another great Italian football player was Giuseppe Meazza. Meazza scored 33 goals in his 53 World Cup appearances. Meazza has the second most goals scored for Italy all time since he is only two goals behind Gigi Riva. Giuseppe won two World Cup's with Italy as well as winning three Serie A titles and one Coppa Italia title.

=== Basketball ===
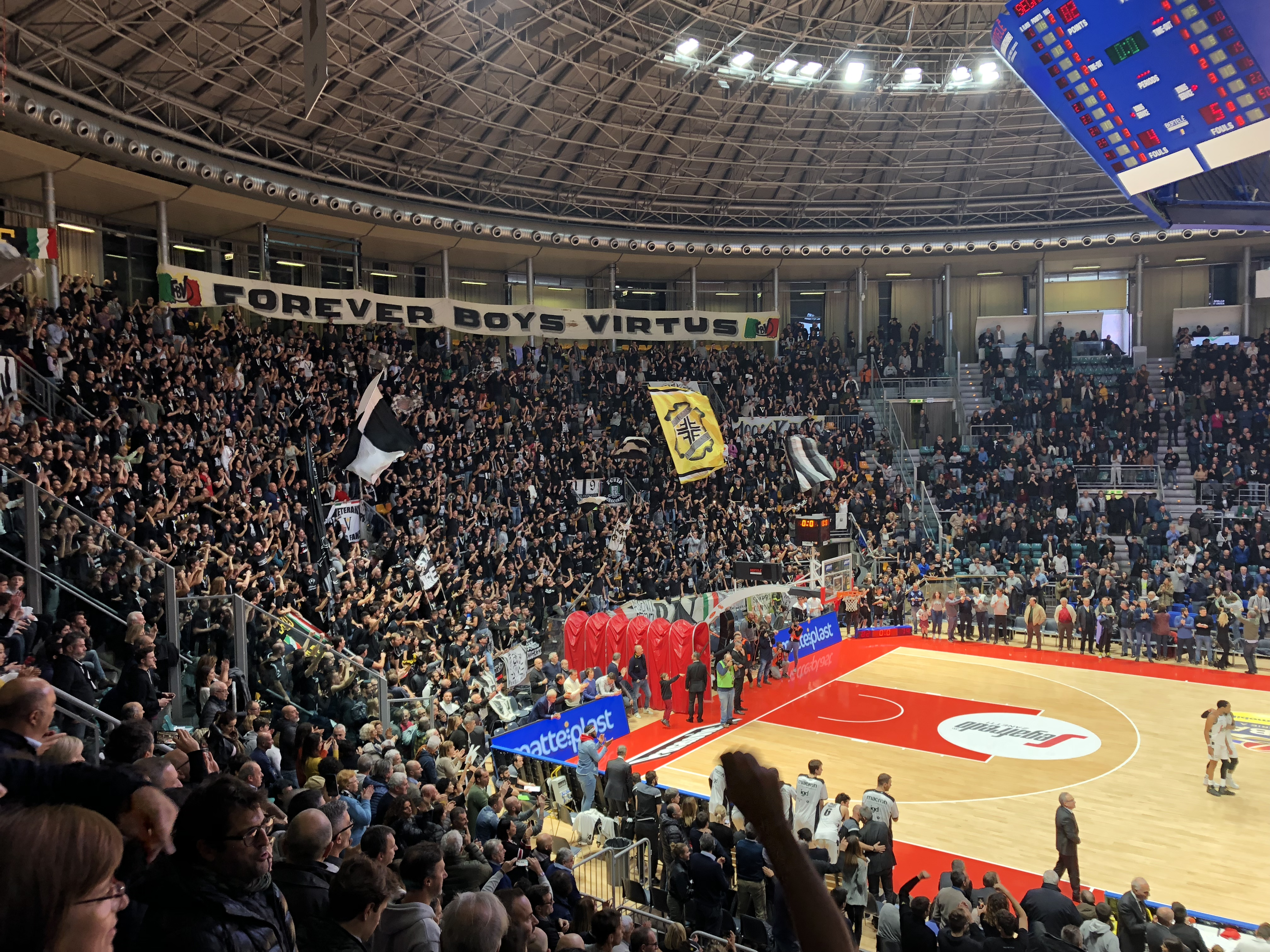
Virtus Bologna's fans of Curva Calori in PalaDozza, 2018

Italy has a long and rich tradition in basketball (pallacanestro in Italian). The Italy men's national basketball team has qualified for 38 EuroBasket tournaments, winning two gold medals (1983, 1999), four silver medals (1937, 1946, 1991, 1997), and four bronze medals (1971, 1975, 1985, 2003) as achievements. While Italy has made nine trips to the World Cup, the closest they have come to winning a medal was in 1970 and 1978, where they finished fourth. In 12 attempts at the Summer Olympics, Italy has earned two silver medals, in 1980 and 2004. Currently, Italy is ranked 10th in the FIBA World Rankings. Italy women's national basketball team at the European Women's Basketball Championship the Italian team won gold medal in 1938 and bronze medal in 1974.

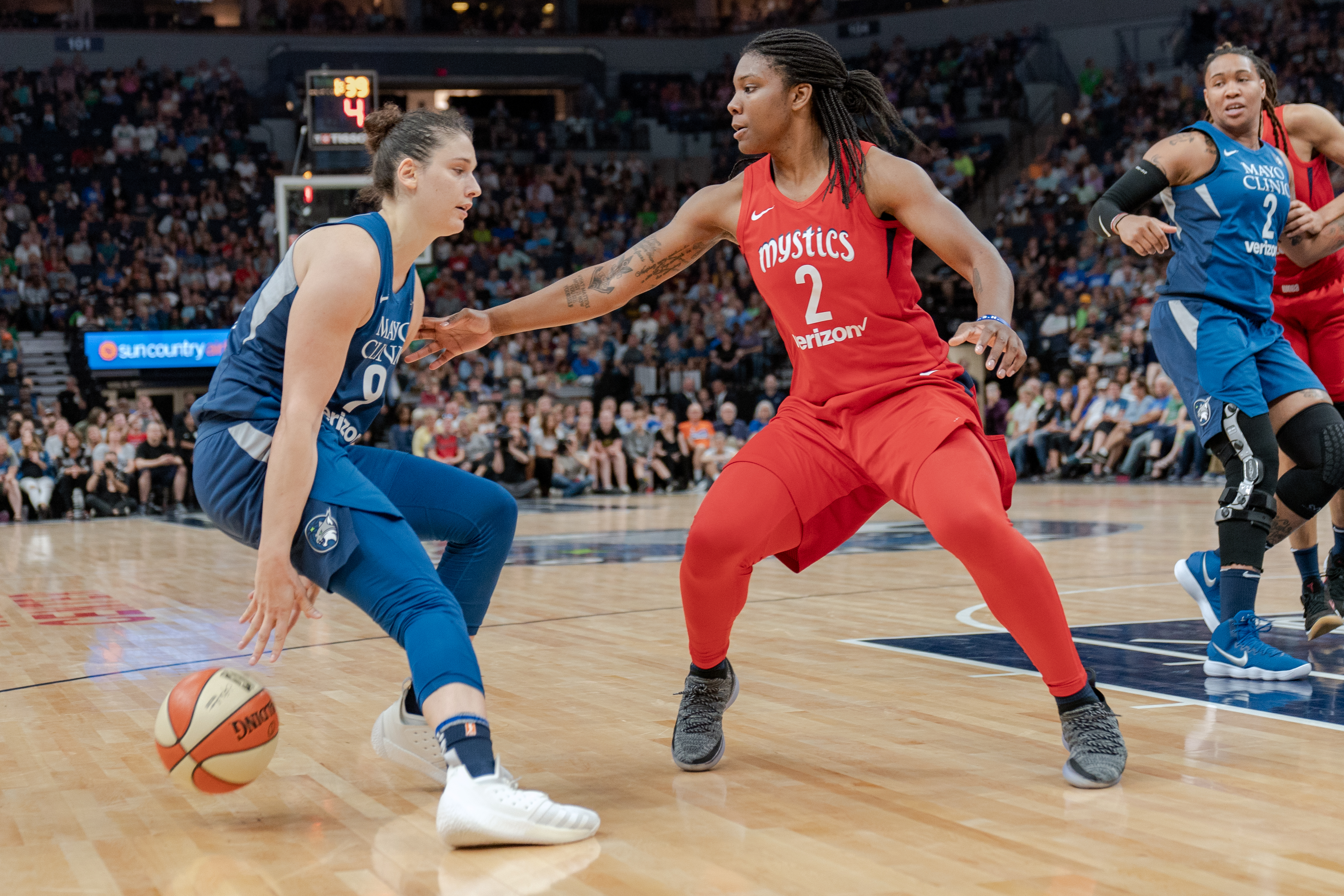
Cecilia Zandalasini guarded by Myisha Hines-Allen in 2018.

A total of 99 teams have competed in the LBA since its inception. Seventeen teams have been crowned champions, with Olimpia Milano having won the title a record 28 times, and Virtus Bologna 16 times. According to FIBA Europe's and Euroleague Basketball's national league coefficients, the LBA was the historically top ranked national domestic league in Europe, for the period 1958 to 2007. Today, the LBA is considered to be one of the top European national basketball leagues. Its clubs have won the most EuroLeague championships (13), the most FIBA Saporta Cups (15), and the most FIBA Korać Cups (10).

Famous Italian club teams include Olimpia Milano, Virtus Bologna, Pallacanestro Varese, Pallacanestro Cantù, Fortitudo Bologna, Victoria Libertas, Pallacanestro Treviso, Mens Sana 1871, Virtus Roma, Pallacanestro Trieste, JuveCaserta and Scaligera Verona.

=== Volleyball ===
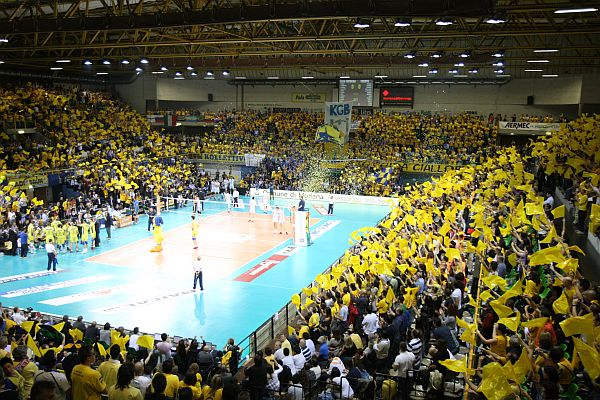
Italian people in PalaPanini for Italian Volleyball League

Volleyball (pallavolo in Italian) is played by a lot of amateur players. The Italian Volleyball League and Italian Women's Volleyball League are held since 1946. Modena Volley won 12 neb's titles, Volley Treviso nine, and Parma eight. Teodora Pallavolo Ravenna won 11 women's titles, Bergamo eight, and Audax Modena five.

In the CEV Champions League, Modena and Treviso won four titles each, Porto Ravenna and Trentino Volley three, Parma two, and CUS Torino and Volley Lube one. In the CEV Women's Champions League, Bergamo won seven titles, Olimpia Teodora Ravenna Sirio Perugia and Matera two each, and Modena and Casalmaggiore won one each.

The Italy men's national volleyball team is one of the most successful national teams in the history of volleyball, having won four World Championships (1990, 1994, 1998 and 2022), seven European Championships (1989, 1993, 1995, 1999, 2003, 2005 and 2021), one World Cup (1995) and eight World League (1990, 1991, 1992, 1994, 1995, 1997, 1999 and 2000). The Italy women's national volleyball team won the FIVB Volleyball Women's World Championship once (2002), the Women's European Volleyball Championship three times (2007, 2009 and 2021) and the FIVB Volleyball Women's Nations League once (2022).

The Italian national teams have won both the 2021 Women's European Volleyball Championship and Men's European Volleyball Championship in the same year. This also makes them the only country to have won the UEFA European Championship, Women's European Volleyball Championship and Men's European Volleyball Championship all in the same year. Italy featured a women's national team in beach volleyball that competed at the 2018–2020 CEV Beach Volleyball Continental Cup.

==== Attendances ====
The average attendance per top-flight league season and the volleyball club with the highest average attendance:

Season	League average	Best club	Best club average
2022–23	3,592	Sir Safety Susa Perugia	4,678

Source: League page on Wikipedia

=== Rugby union ===
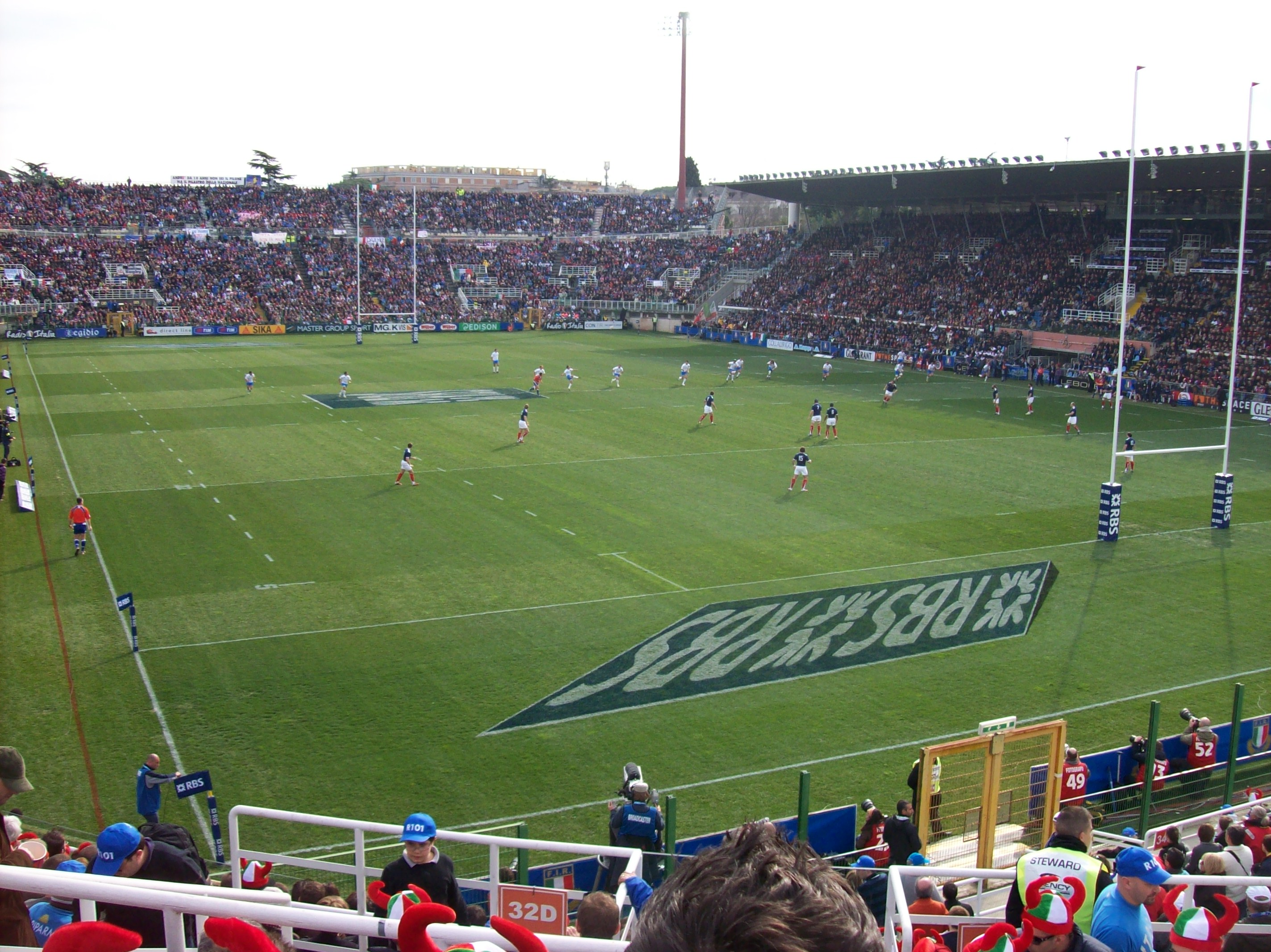
The Stadio Flaminio during a rugby union match in the 2011 Six Nations Championship, between Italy and France, which resulted in an upset victory for Italy.

Rugby union (rugby a 15 in Italian) enjoys a good level of popularity, especially in the north of the country. From the 2010–11 season, Italy has had two teams in the Pro12, previously an all-Celtic competition, involving teams from Ireland, Scotland, and Wales. To accommodate this move, the country's National Championship of Excellence effectively became a semi-professional developmental competition. The two Pro12 sides took up Italy's existing places in the elite Europe-wide club competition, then known as the Heineken Cup and now as the European Rugby Champions Cup, and four Eccellenza sides compete in the second-tier European Rugby Challenge Cup. Italy's national team competes since 2000 in the Six Nations Championship, and is a regular at the Rugby World Cup, despite having yet to pass the group stage. Italy are classed as a tier-one nation by World Rugby.

Rugby union in Italy is governed by the Italian Rugby Federation. Rugby was introduced into Italy in the early 1900s. It is also known as pallovale or palla ovale ("oval ball") within Italy. The governing body of Italian rugby union is the Federazione Italiana Rugby (FIR). An original organisational committee was established in 1911, although it was in 1928 when the body became the FIR, and in 1987, it joined the International Rugby Board. In 1934 the FIR became a founding member of the Federation Internationale de Rugby Amateur.

Rugby union's traditional heartland consisted of the small country towns in the Po Valley, and other parts of Northern Italy. One version says that Italian workers returning from France, particularly the south, introduced the game there, and gave it a significant rural/working class base, which still exists in towns such as Treviso and Rovigo. A demonstration game was also played in 1910, in Turin between Racing Club Paris and Servette of Geneva. The Top10, known as the Peroni Top10 for sponsorship reasons, and formerly Top 12, is Italy's top level professional men's rugby union competition. The Top 10 is run by Italian Rugby Federation and is contested by 10 teams, following the Italian federation's decision to name Peroni as the official partner of the Top10 competition. Notable Italian players include Ivan Francescato, Paolo Vaccari, Carlo Checchinato, Massimo Giovanelli, Mauro and Mirco Bergamasco, and Sergio Parisse.

=== Calendar of the major men's and women's professional sports leagues in Italy ===
January	February	March	April	May	June	July	August	September	October	November	December
Serie A (Football)							Serie A (Football)				
LBA (Basketball)									LBA (Basketball)		
Superlega (Volleyball)									Superlega (Volleyball)		
URC (Rugby Union)								URC (Rugby Union)			
Serie A Elite (Rugby Union)									Serie A Elite (Rugby Union)		

January	February	March	April	May	June	July	August	September	October	November	December
Serie A Women (Football)									Serie A Women (Football)		
LBF(Basketball)								LBF(Basketball)			
Serie A Femminile (Volleyball)									Serie A Femminile (Volleyball)		
Serie A Elite (Rugby Union)									Serie A Elite (Rugby Union)		

== Minor team sports ==
=== Water polo ===
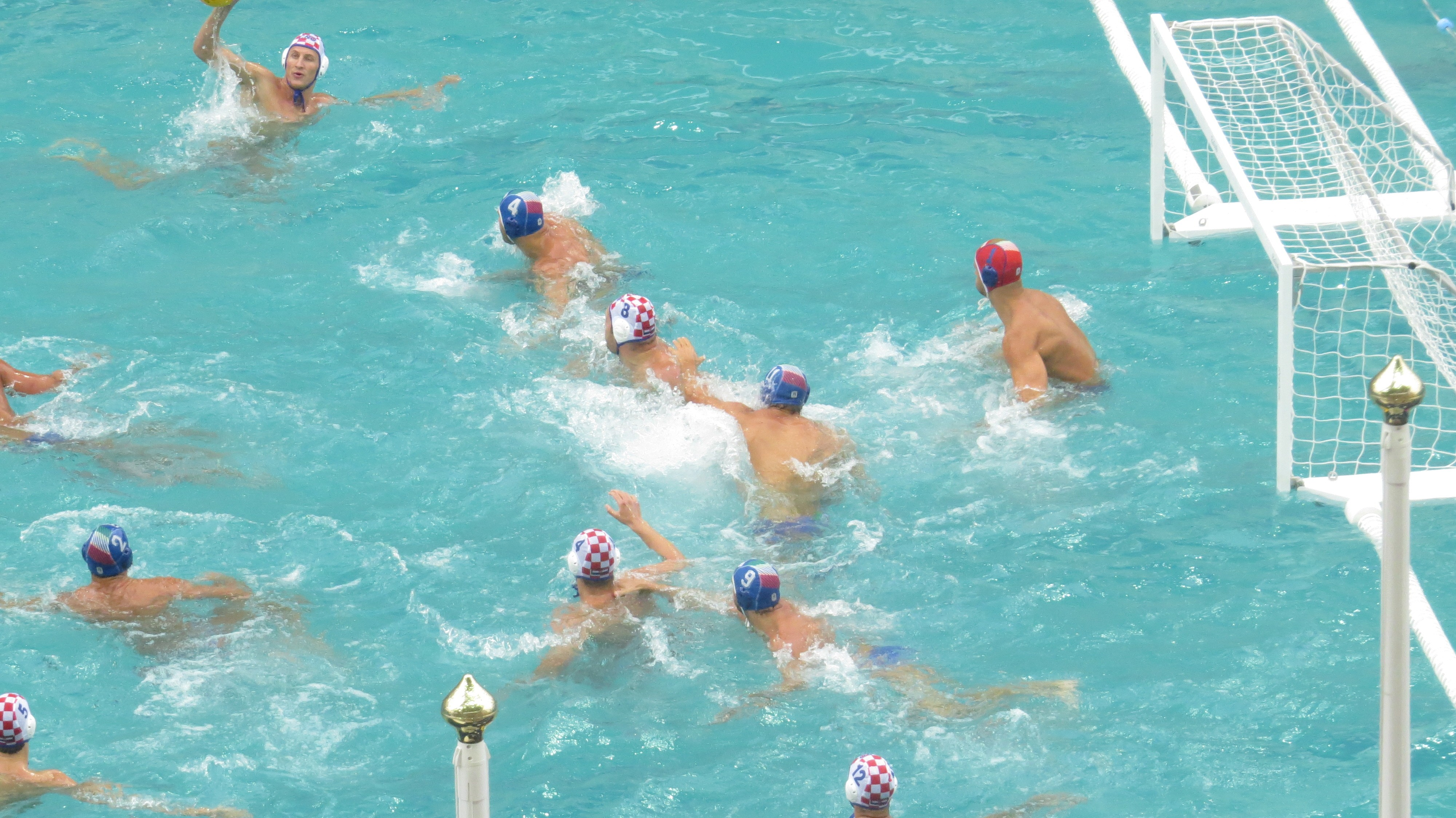
Italy men's national water polo team vs. Croatia during the 2016 Summer Olympics

The Italy men's national water polo team represents Italy in men's international water polo (pallanuoto in Italian) competitions. The national men's team has the nickname of Settebello, a reference to both the Italian card game scopa and a standard water polo team having seven players. The Italian men's water polo team has won 8 Olympic medals, 7 World Championships, 5 World Cup, 11 European Championships medals and 3 World League medals, making them one of the most successful men's water polo teams in the world. They have won a combined twelve championships in those five competitions, with the World League, the last competition which Italy won in 2022.

The Italy women's national water polo team represents Italy in international women's water polo competitions and friendly matches. The team is one of the leading teams in Europe since the mid-1990s, claiming the title at the 2004 Summer Olympics in Athens, Greece. The squad is nicknamed the Setterosa. The Serie A1 di pallanuoto maschile is the premier division of the Italian water polo male national championship. First held in 1912, it is currently contested by twelve teams. Pro Recco is the Serie A1's most successful club with 36 titles since 1959, followed by CN Posillipo with eleven.

- Other popular water team sport in Italy is water basketball (pallacanestro acquatica in Italian).

=== Handball ===
The Serie A is the name of the highest level handball (pallamano in Italian) league of Italy. Pallamano Trieste is the championship's most successful club with seventeen titles. The Serie A1 is the premier division of the Italian women's handball national league. Established in 1970, it is currently contested by 13 clubs. PF Cassano Magnago is the championship's most successful club with eleven titles in a row between 1986 and 1996, while Jomi Salerno has been the most successful team in the 21st century so far with seven titles between 2004 and 2019.

=== Ice hockey ===
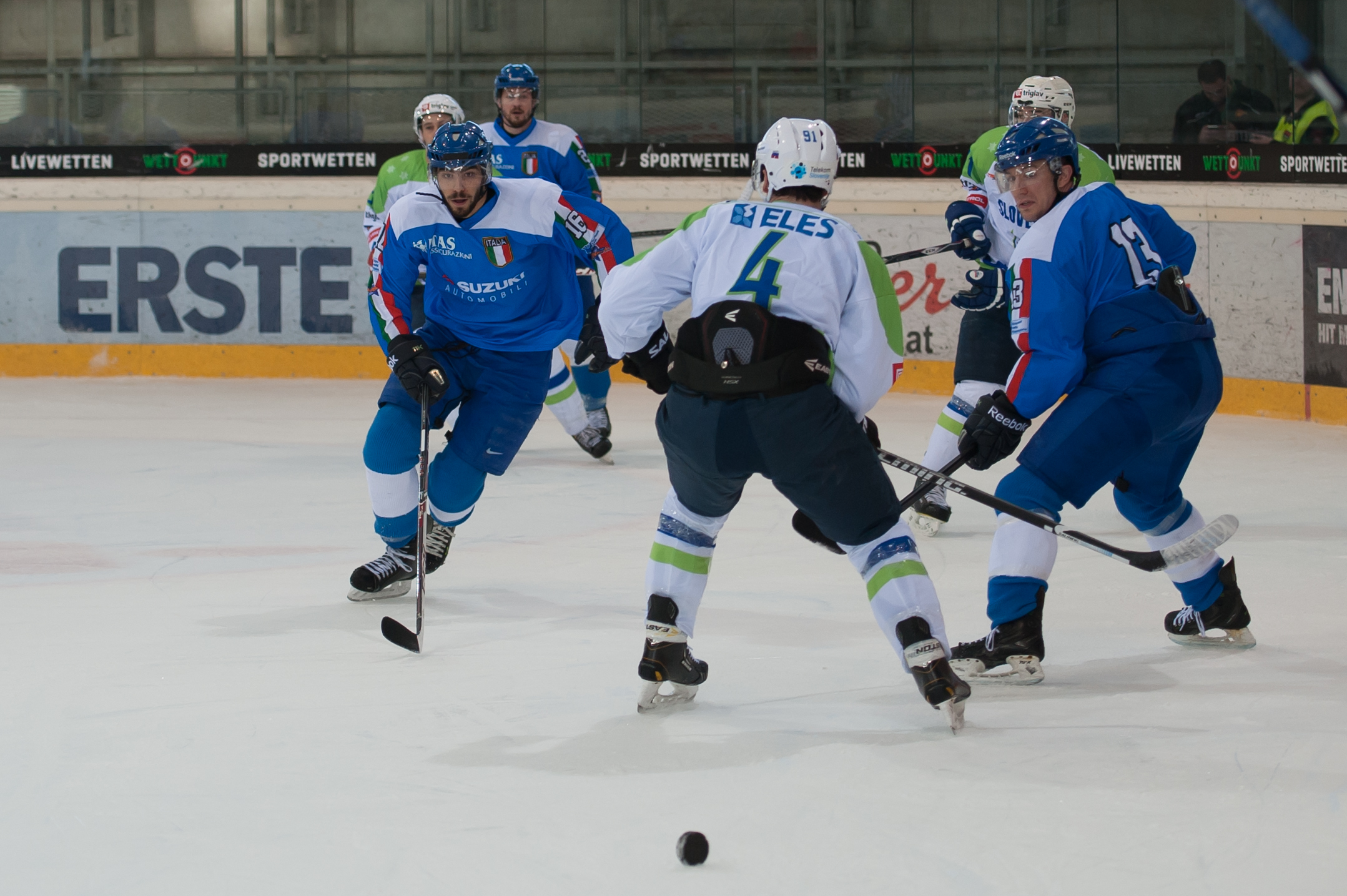
Euro Ice Hockey Challenge in 2015, Italy vs. Slovenia

Ice hockey (hockey su ghiaccio in Italian) is popular mainly in the Northern Italy. The Italy men's national ice hockey team is the national ice hockey team of Italy, and is controlled by the Federazione Italiana Sport del Ghiaccio (FISG), a member of the International Ice Hockey Federation. Italy men's national ice hockey team ranks 17th in the IIHF World Ranking (2022).

Italian Hockey League - Serie A, formerly known as Serie A, is the top tier of professional ice hockey in Italy, which first began play in 1925. They are conducted under the authority of the Federazione Italiana Sport del Ghiaccio (FISG). The league initially merged with the Inter-National League to become the Alps Hockey League in 2016. Italian teams in the Alps Hockey League also compete in the Italian Hockey League - Serie A. The league was known as Elite.A during the 2013–14 season, and as Italian Hockey League - Elite during the 2017-2018 season.

=== Futsal ===
The Italy national futsal team represents Italy in international futsal (calcetto in Italian) competitions such as the FIFA Futsal World Cup and the European Championships and is controlled by the Italian Football Federation. It is one of the strongest teams in Europe, champions in the 2003 UEFA Futsal Championship and UEFA Futsal Euro 2014. The Italy national futsal team has appeared in the final match of the FIFA Futsal World Cup once (2004) as well as two third/fourth place playoffs.

=== American football ===
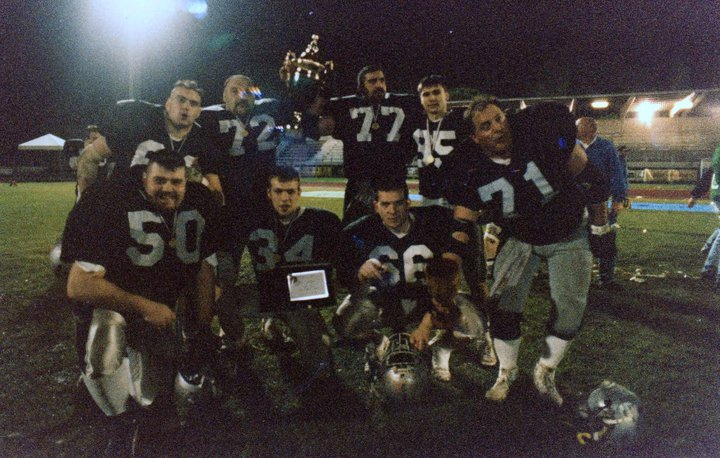
Legnano Frogs celebrate victory after winning the XV Italian Bowl in 1995

Italian Football League (IFL) is the top level American football (football americano in Italian) league in Italy established in 1980. The annual final play-off game to determine the league champion is called the Italian Bowl, that awards the title of "champion of Italy" and the scudetto. Italian teams that have won the Eurobowl have been Legnano Frogs (1989) and Bergamo Lions (2000, 2001 and 2002).

The Italy national American football team, nicknamed the Blue Team is the national American football team for Italy. They have been successful, having won the European championship three times, and been runner up three times. They won the 2021 IFAF European Championship, its third European title, having also won in 1983 and 1985. The best result at the IFAF World Championship was 4th place at the 1999 IFAF World Championship.

== Individual Sports ==
=== Water sports ===
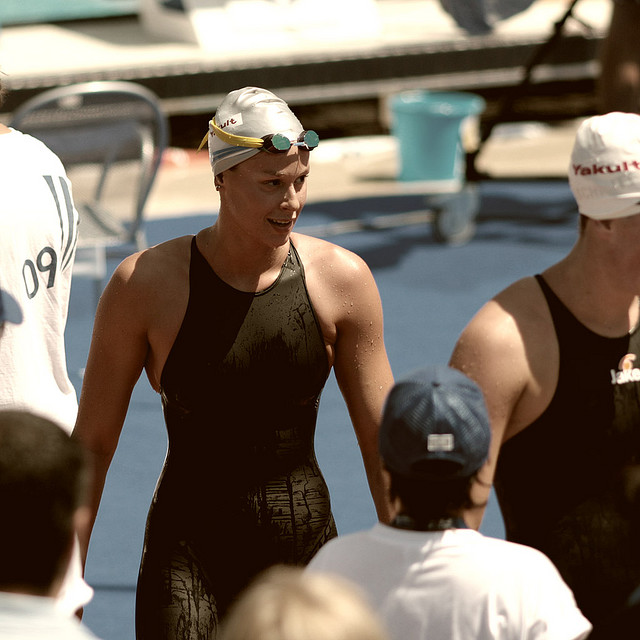
Federica Pellegrini during the 2009 World Aquatics Championships

- Swimming (nuoto in Italian) is a popular sport in Italy. The Italian Swimming Federation, founded in 1899 is the principal Swimming Federation in Italy. It brings together more than 1200 clubs. The Italy national swimming team represents Italy in International swimming competitions such as Olympic Games or World swimming Championships. Notable Italian swimmers are Novella Calligaris, Giorgio Lamberti, Domenico Fioravanti, Massimiliano Rosolino, Alessio Boggiatto, Federica Pellegrini, Filippo Magnini and Gregorio Paltrinieri.
- Sailing (vela in Italian) and rowing (canottaggio in Italian) are popular sport in Italy. Notable Italian sailors are Agostino Straulino and Alessandra Sensini, while noteworthy Italian rower are Peppiniello Di Capua, Giuseppe Abbagnale, Carmine Abbagnale and Agostino Abbagnale.

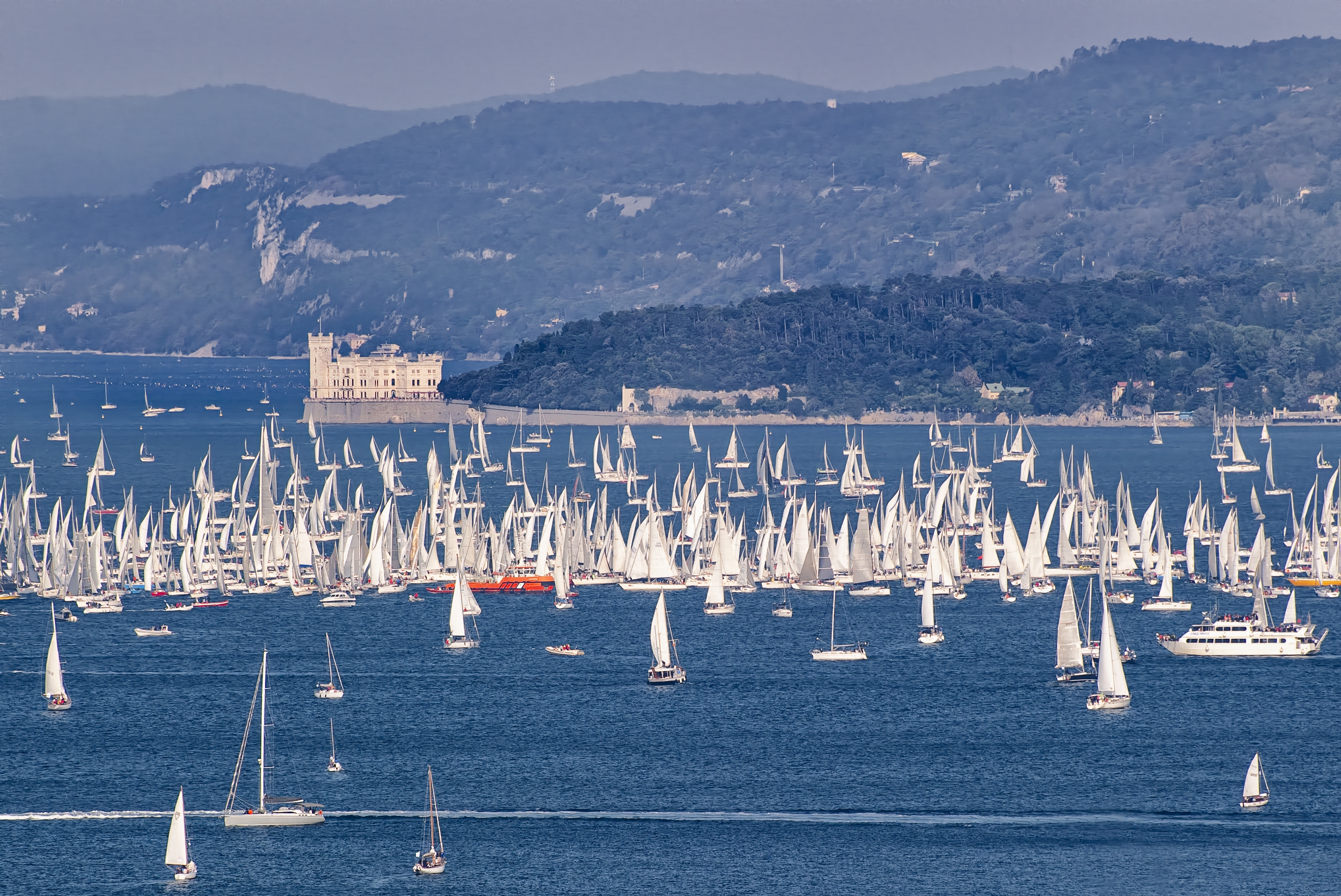
Barcolana is the largest regatta in the world.

- On the second Sunday of October in the Gulf of Trieste the Barcolana is held: established in 1969, it is today the largest regatta in the world. The Barcolana became the Guinness World Record holder in February 2019 when it was named "the greatest sailing race" with its 2,689 boats and over 16,000 sailors on the starting line. The Barcolana is organized by the yacht club Società Velica di Barcola e Grignano. Thanks to its particular formula, the Barcolana is a unique event on the international sailing stage: on the same starting line expert sailors and sailing lovers race side by side on boats of different sizes divided into several divisions according to their overall length. Still on the subject of boat racing, another noteworthy race is the Regatta of the Historical Marine Republics. The Regatta of the Historical Maritime Republics is a sporting event of historical re-enactment, established in 1955 with the aim of recalling the rivalry of the most famous Italian maritime republics: those of Republic of Amalfi, Republic of Pisa, Republic of Genoa and Republic of Venice, during which four rowing crews representing each of the republics compete against each other. This event, held under the patronage of the President of Italy, takes place every year on a day between the end of May and the beginning of July, and is hosted in rotation between these cities.
- In 1972, synchronized swimming (nuoto sincronizzato in Italian) took hold in Italy, thanks to the commitment of a swimming teacher at the Lanciani swimming pool in Rome, who decided to let boys and girls try to train the alternating backstroke, rhythmizing the movements. In 1976 the first synchronized swimming team was formed, the "clams", made up of seven girls and one boy. At the Italian swimming pools athletes and swimming teachers began to study and practice the discipline, teaching it and making the sport grow.
- Towards the end of the 19th century the diving (tuffi in Italian) also spread to Italy and in particular to Rome where the Ponte Milvio became an ideal place for acrobatics on the Tiber. In Italy, the first national diving championship was held in 1900 in Milan, at Bagni di Diana. Notable Italian diver is Klaus Dibiasi, while noteworthy Italian free-diver is Enzo Maiorca.
- Other popular water sports in Italy are water skiing (sci nautico in Italian), surfing (surf in Italian) and water basketball (pallacanestro acquatica in Italian).

=== Gymnastics ===
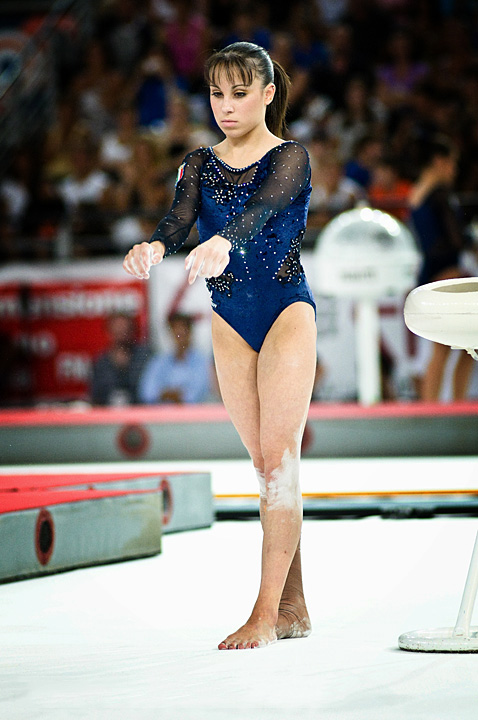
Vanessa Ferrari is one of Italy's most accomplished artistic gymnasts.

Gymnastics (ginnastica in Italian) is a popular sport in Italy. On 17 March 1844, the Royal Gymnastics Society of Turin, the oldest sports club in Italy, was established by the Swiss gymnast Rudolf Obermann, called to Italy by King Charles Albert of Piedmont-Sardinia. On 15 March 1869, the Italian Gymnastics Federation was founded in Venice, the first sports federation in the history of Italy.

At the turn of the millennium, Italy showed a growing quality in the discipline, with Susanna Marchesi finishing 9th at the Individual All Around competition, as well as the team winning 6th place in the 2000 Summer Olympics. Italy won the silver medal at the 2004 Summer Olympics and came in at 4th place at the 2008 Summer Olympics. They also collected a string of medals throughout the 2005–2008 Olympic cycle. At the 2009 Rhythmic Gymnastics Championship in Mie, Japan, the team soared to first place, winning the gold medal and becoming the new queens, a feat they achieved again at the 2010 Rhythmic Gymnastics Championship in Moscow. The celebration of Italian gymnastics is because they are among the best squads in the world, facing competitions against the Eastern European block of nations: Belarus, Russia, and Bulgaria. Vanessa Ferrari was multiple world and European champion of artistic gymnastics.

=== Winter sports ===
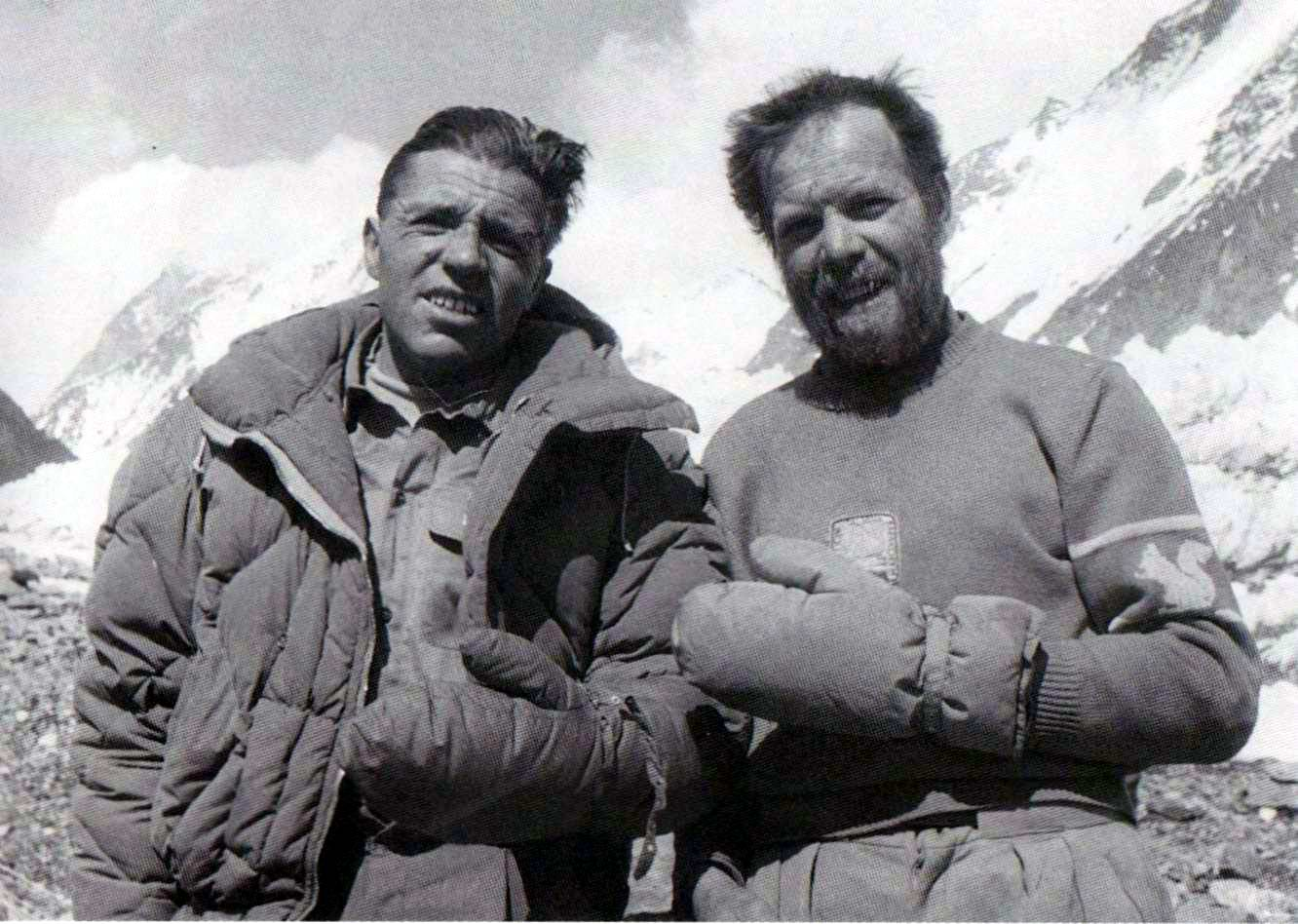
Achille Compagnoni and Lino Lacedelli, the first people to reach the summit of K2.

Winter sports (sport invernali in Italian), are popular in Italy. Among them, Italians excel in cross-country skiing (sci di fondo in Italian), but also in luge (slittino in Italian), with the two time Olympic gold medal winner Armin Zoeggeler.

- Alpine skiing or ski (sci in Italian) is a very popular sport in Italy, with more than 2,000,000 skiers, most of them in the northern regions near the Alps and in the central provinces near the Apennine Mountains. Italian skiers have achieved good results in the Winter Olympic Games, World Cup, and World Championship, most notably Zeno Colò, Gustavo Thoeni, who won 4 Overall World Cups between 1970 and 1975; Piero Gros, who was Overall World Cup champion in 1974, Alberto Tomba who won the Overall World Cup in 1995 and Federica Brignone, who was overall World Cup champion in 2020 and 2025. Tomba, Brignone, Deborah Compagnoni, and Isolde Kostner received many medals in different editions of the Winter Olympic Games. Giorgio Rocca and Manfred Mölgg won the Slalom World Cup in 2006 and 2008 respectively, whilst Giuliano Razzoli was Olympic slalom champion in 2010 and Sofia Goggia was Olympic downhill champion in 2018. Other Italian winners of World Cup discipline titles include Peter Fill, Peter Runggaldier, Denise Karbon, Marta Bassino and Dominik Paris, with the latter two also winning World Championship golds.
- Cross-country skiing (sci di fondo in Italian) is popular in northern Italy, with athletes, who have won medals at the Winter Olympics, of the likes of Franco Nones, Maurilio De Zolt, Stefania Belmondo, Marco Albarello, Giuseppe Pulie, Giorgio Vanzetta, Silvio Fauner, Bice Vanzetta, Manuela Di Centa, Gabriella Paruzzi, Fulvio Valbusa, Fabio Maj, Karin Moroder, Pietro Piller Cottrer, Cristian Zorzi, Giorgio Di Centa, Arianna Follis, Antonella Confortola, Sabina Valbusa and Federico Pellegrino.
- Alpinism (alpinismo in Italian) is followed, because Italian alpinists wrote several pages of history in this sport. Italians Achille Compagnoni and Lino Lacedelli conquered first the summit of K2 (8611 m) in 1954, in the expedition led by the geologist Ardito Desio. Reinhold Messner was the first man in the world to reach the 14 summits, over 8,000 meters, and the first one to climb Mount Everest alone and without oxygen. Cesare Maestri conquered the Cerro Torre in Patagonia in 1959. Walter Bonatti is considered one of the best alpinists in Europe in 1950s, realizing some ascents considered impossible by the competitors.
- Figure skating (pattinaggio di figura in Italian) is a popular sport and professional figure skaters often starring in events of exhibition. Notable Italian athlete in figure skating is Carolina Kostner.
- Bobsleigh (bob in Italian) is very followed, because Italian bobsledder Eugenio Monti was the most successful athlete in the international history of this sport.
- Luge (slittino in Italian) is followed from its history, with Paul Hildgartner and Gerda Weissensteiner to the recent dominance of Armin Zöggeler.

=== Cycling ===
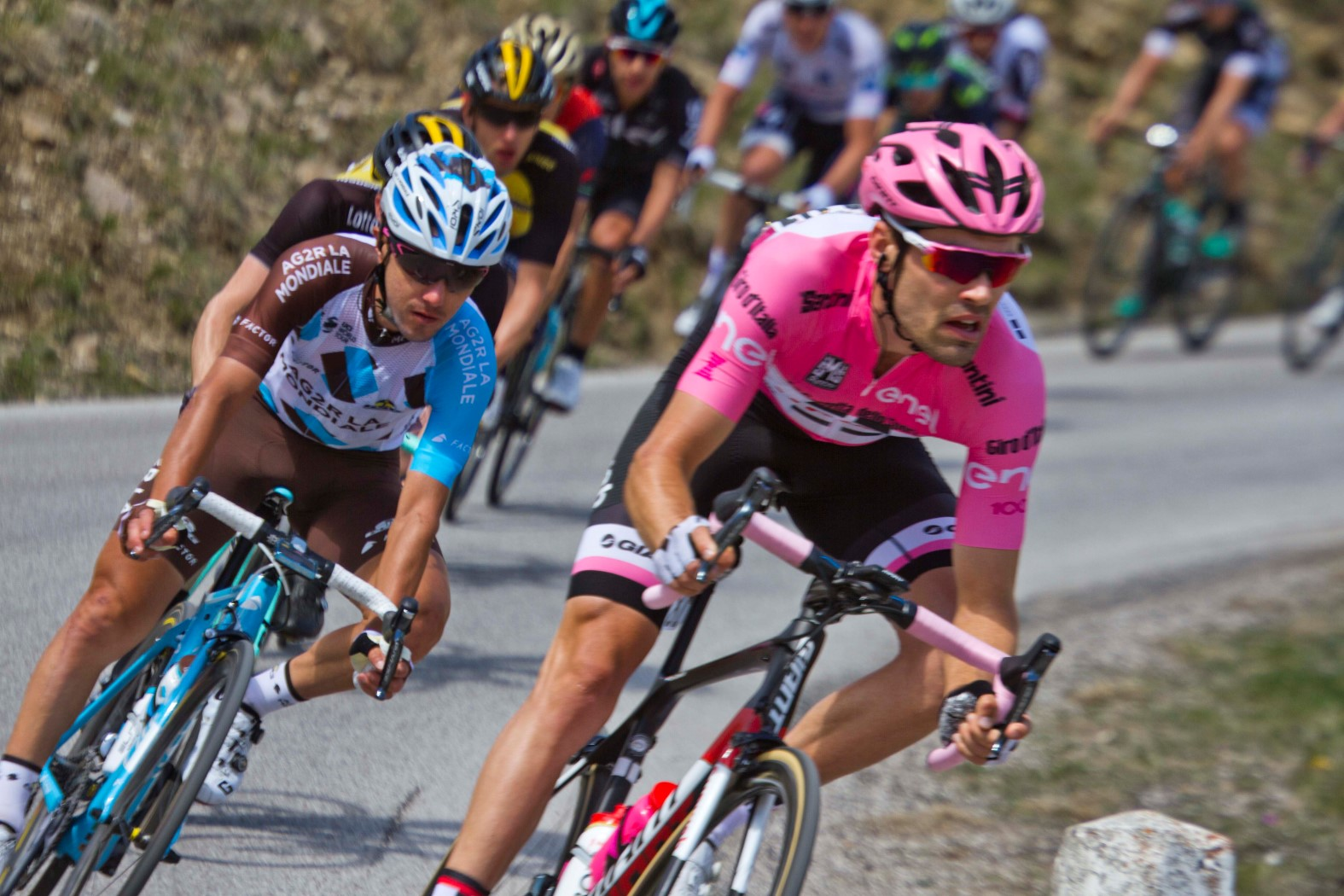
Starting in 1909, the Giro d'Italia is the Grands Tours' second oldest.

Cycling (ciclismo in Italian) is a well-represented sport in Italy. Bicycle racing is a familiar sport in the country. Italians have won the World Cycling Championship more than any other country, except Belgium. The Giro d'Italia is a world-famous long-distance cycling race held every May, and constitutes one of the three Grand Tours, along with the Tour de France and the Vuelta a España, each of which last approximately three weeks. The race has been held annually since its first edition in 1909, except during the two world wars. As the Giro gained prominence and popularity the race was lengthened, and the peloton expanded from primarily Italian participation to riders from all over the world. The Giro is a UCI World Tour event, which means that the teams that compete in the race are mostly UCI WorldTeams, with some additional teams invited as 'wild cards'. The rider with the lowest aggregate time is the leader of the general classification and wears the pink jersey.

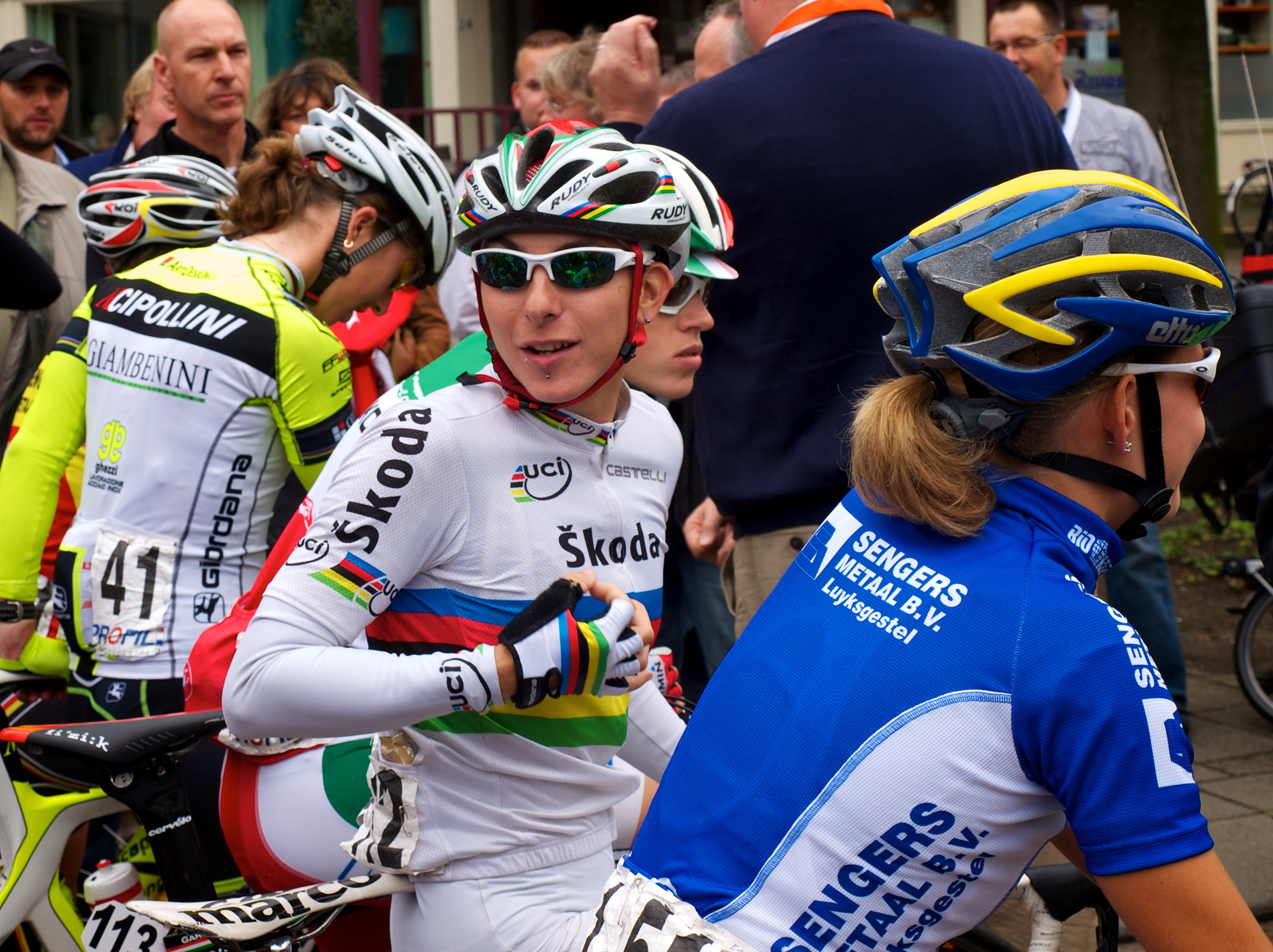
Giorgia Bronzini cyclist specializing in road and track events, known for her sprinting abilities and multiple world championship titles in track cycling.

Two of the five 'Monuments', the oldest and most prestigious one-day races on the cycling calendar, are located in Italy: Milan–San Remo, held in March, and Giro di Lombardia, held in September or October. The Milan–San Remo, also called "The Spring classic" or "La Classicissima", is an annual road cycling race between Milan and Sanremo, in Northwest Italy. With a distance of 298 km (~185.2 miles) it is the longest professional one-day race in modern cycling. It is the first major classic race of the season. The first edition was held in 1907. The Giro di Lombardia, officially Il Lombardia, is a cycling race in Lombardy, Italy. It is traditionally the last of the five 'Monuments' of the season, considered to be one of the most prestigious one-day events in cycling, and one of the last events on the UCI World Tour calendar. Nicknamed the Classica delle foglie morte ("the Classic of the falling (dead) leaves"), it is the most important Autumn Classic in cycling. The race's most famous climb is the Madonna del Ghisallo in the race finale. Because of its demanding course, the race is considered a climbers classic, favouring climbers with a strong sprint finish.

Some of the most successful Italian road cyclists have been Costante Girardengo, Fausto Coppi, Gino Bartali, Alfredo Binda, Felice Gimondi, Fiorenzo Magni, Mario Cipollini, Francesco Moser, Marco Pantani, Moreno Argentin, Paolo Bettini, Michele Bartoli, Gianni Bugno, Alessandro Petacchi and Vincenzo Nibali.

The economic footprint of the sport is substantial, with around 33 million visitors in Italy now including some cycling in their trip according to pro.eurovelo.com. Within that group, Ecobnb reports about 9 million “pure” cycle tourists travel primarily to ride. In 2023, cycling tourism generated 56.8 million trips and over €5.5 billion in direct economic impact per E-Bike Travel, and by 2024, the Cycle Tourism Show estimated visits tied to cycle tourism in Italy reached 89 million, continuing the boom.

=== Tennis ===
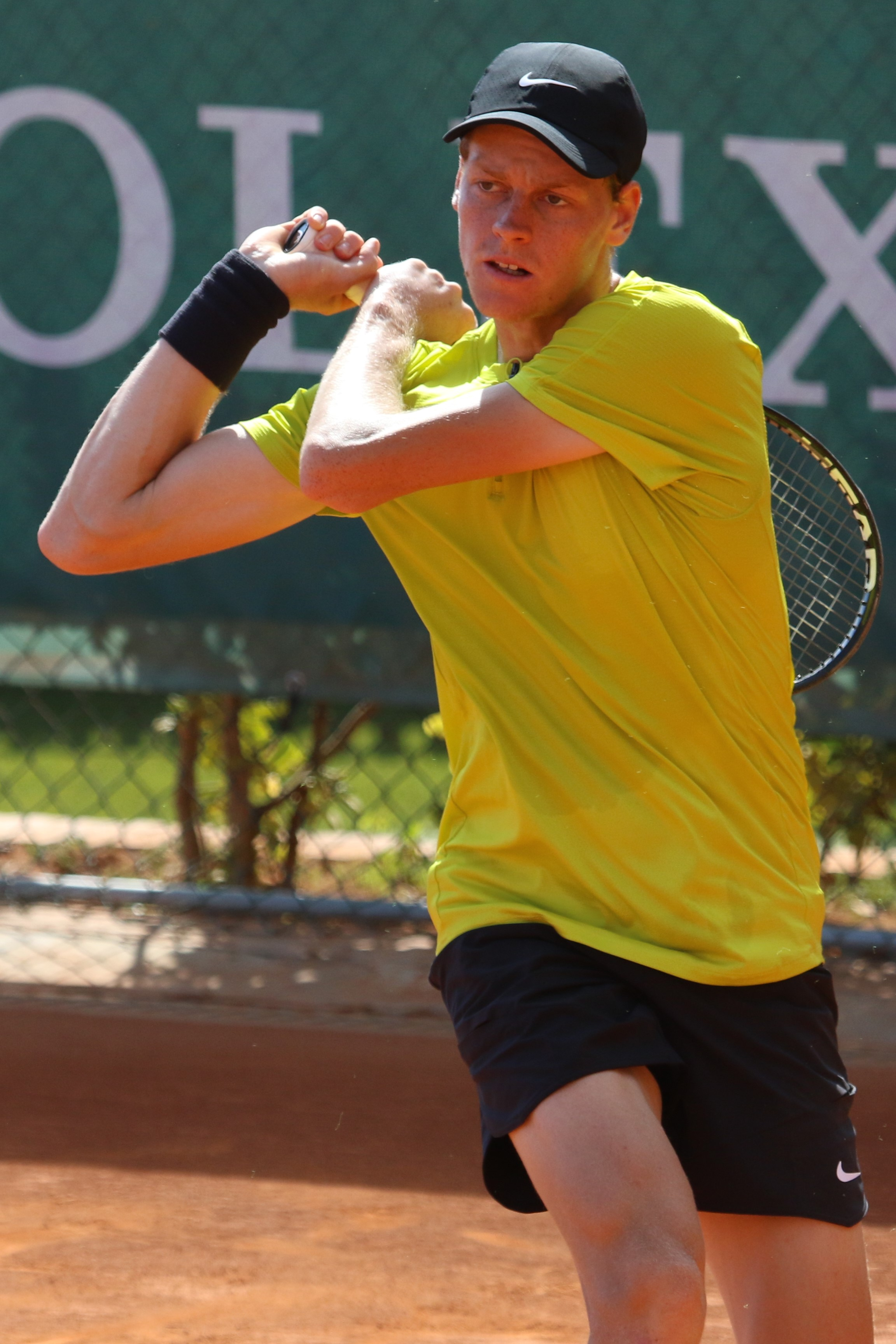
Jannik Sinner

Tennis has a significant following near courts and by television. Italian professional tennis players are always in the top 100 world's ranking of male and female players. The Rome Masters, founded in 1930, is one of the most prestigious tennis tournaments in the world. Beach tennis with paddle racquet was invented by Italians, and is practiced by many people across the country.

The five most successful Italian tennis players with regard to Grand Slam tournament results are Nicola Pietrangeli (1959 French Championships and 1960 French Championships), Adriano Panatta (1976 French Open), Francesca Schiavone (2010 French Open), Flavia Pennetta (2015 US Open) and Jannik Sinner (2024 Australian Open, 2024 US Open, 2025 Australian Open, and 2025 Wimbledon).

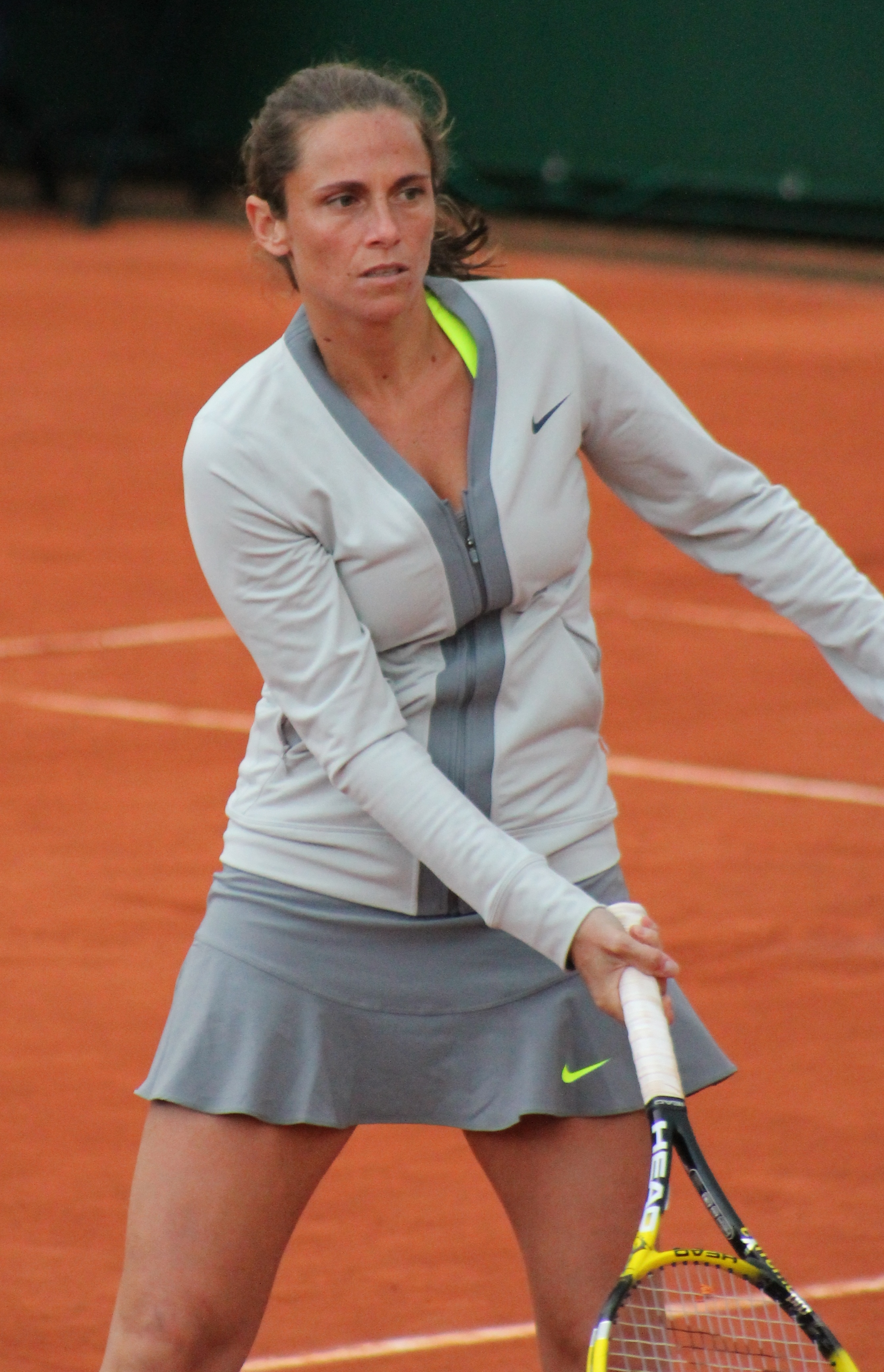
Roberta Vinci tennis player.

The Italy Davis Cup team won the 1976 Davis Cup, and other three in a row in 2023 Davis Cup, 2024 Davis Cup, and 2025 Davis Cup and the Italy Fed Cup team won six times the Fed Cup in 2006, 2009, 2010, 2013, 2024, 2025. These triumphs, including an extraordinary three in a row, establish Italy as a true queen of modern tennis prestige. Italian players such as Sara Errani, Flavia Pennetta, Roberta Vinci and Francesca Schiavone have entered the WTA Top 10 in their careers. Schiavone was the first Italian player to win a Grand Slam singles title, winning the 2010 French Open; she was later followed by Pennetta, who won the 2015 US Open. The doubles duo of Sara Errani and Roberta Vinci have accomplished a Career Grand Slam in doubles, have been named ITF World Champions 3 years in a row (2012, 2013, 2014) and have ended every season since 2012 as World No. 1. In 2019, Matteo Berrettini became the first Italian in singles to reach the final of Wimbledon. Jannik Sinner winner of four Grand Slam titles is currently the top Italian player in the ATP rankings, while Jasmine Paolini is currently the top Italian player in the WTA rankings.

=== Athletics ===
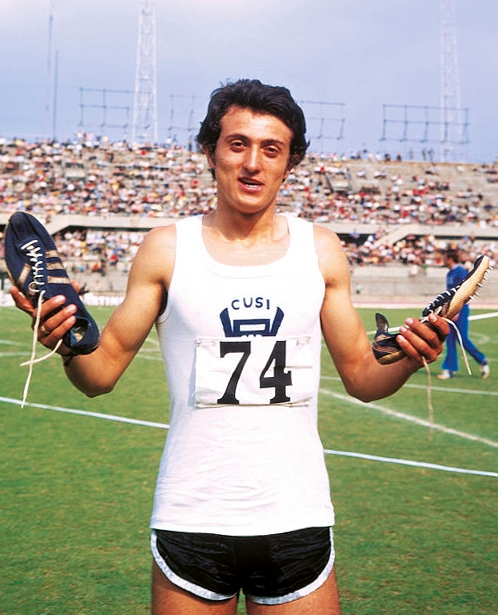
Pietro Mennea

The governing body of Athletics (atletica leggera in Italian) in Italy is Italian Athletics Federation affiliated to European federation, the European Athletic Association (EAA), international federation, the International Association of Athletics Federations (IAAF) and Italian National Olympic Committee (CONI), which in turn is a member of International Olympic Committee (IOC).

The Italy national athletics team represents Italy at the international athletics competitions such as Olympic Games or world athletics championships. Amongst the most famous Italian athletes, there's the sprinter Pietro Mennea (1952-2013) who held the 200 metres world record (19:72) for 17 years from 1979 to 1996 and is still holder of the European record.

Other notable Italian athletes are Ugo Frigerio, Ondina Valla, Adolfo Consolini, Pino Dordoni, Abdon Pamich, Livio Berruti, Sara Simeoni, Gabriella Dorio, Alberto Cova, Gelindo Bordin, Stefano Baldini, Maurizio Damilano, Dorando Pietri, Paola Pigni, Luigi Beccali, Alessandro Andrei, Gianmarco Tamberi and Marcell Jacobs.

=== Bodybuilding ===
In Italy, bodybuilding is at the 10th place in the ranking of most popular sports, even considering the high number of people who engage in body building gym, as amateur, just to keep fit themselves.

=== Combat sports ===
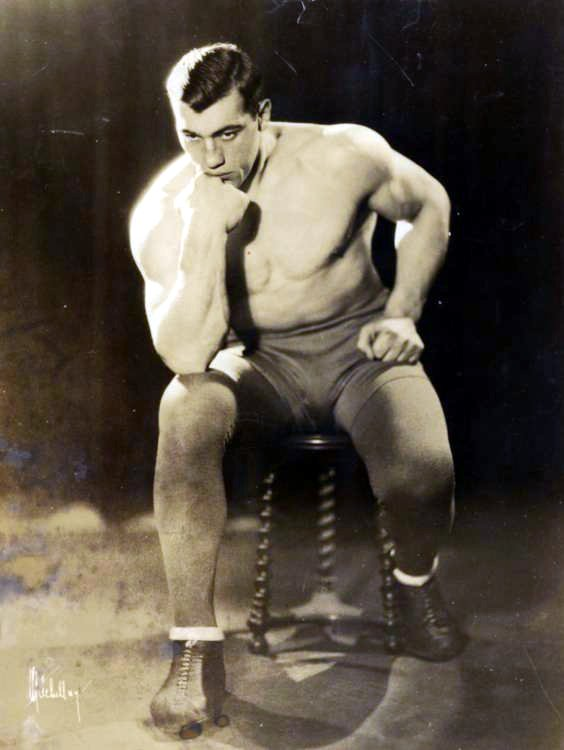
Primo Carnera, boxer and wrestler.

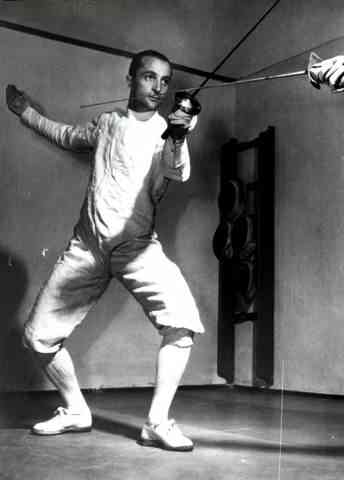
Edoardo Mangiarotti, the world's most successful fencer.

Combat sports are participated and followed sports. There are many national and international events every year.

- Boxing is a sport, that Italy ranks in at 4th all-time at the Olympics. Notable Italian boxers are Francesco Damiani, Primo Carnera, Nino Benvenuti, Bruno Arcari, Patrizio Oliva, Duilio Loi, Sandro Mazzinghi and Roberto Cammarelle.
- Fencing (scherma in Italian) is a very successful sport and Italy is the most successful fencing country at the Olympics. Italy national fencing team represents Italy in International fencing competitions such as Olympic Games or World Fencing Championships. The national Italian fencing team participated to all the Summer Olympics editions, from Paris 1900, 26 times on 28. Noteworthy fencers are Nedo Nadi, Giulio Gaudini, Edoardo Mangiarotti, Giuseppe Delfino, Irene Camber, Mauro Numa, Giovanna Trillini and Valentina Vezzali.
- Italy ranks 8th all-time in judo at the Olympics. Notable Italian judoka winners of gold medals at the Olympics are Ezio Gamba, Giuseppe Maddaloni, Fabio Basile and Giulia Quintavalle.
- Karate is participated in Italy, both amateur and professionally. Notable Italian karateka are Luigi Busà, Mattia Busato, Angelo Crescenzo, Luca Maresca, Simone Marino, Michele Martina, Carlo Pedersoli Jr., Pino Presti, Luca Valdesi, Luigi Zoia, Sara Battaglia, Viviana Bottaro, Sara Cardin, Carola Casale, Terryana D'Onofrio, Michela Pezzetti and Silvia Semeraro.
- Kickboxing is participated in Italy, both amateur and professionally. Notable Italian kickboxers are Gery Bavetta, Alessandro Campagna, Gabriele Casella, Mathias Gallo Cassarino, Roberto Cocco, Mustapha Haida, Gregorio Di Leo, Armen Petrosyan, Giorgio Petrosyan, Alessandro Riguccini, Mara Romero Borella, Annalisa Bucci, Silvia La Notte, Gloria Peritore, Chantal Ughi, Jleana Valentino, Veronica Vernocchi, Martine Michieletto and Chiara Vincis.
- Notable Italian athlete in Greco-Roman wrestling (lotta greco-romana in Italian) is Vincenzo Maenza.

=== Motorsports ===
Motorsports (sport motoristici in Italian) in Italy have an important tradition and are very popular.

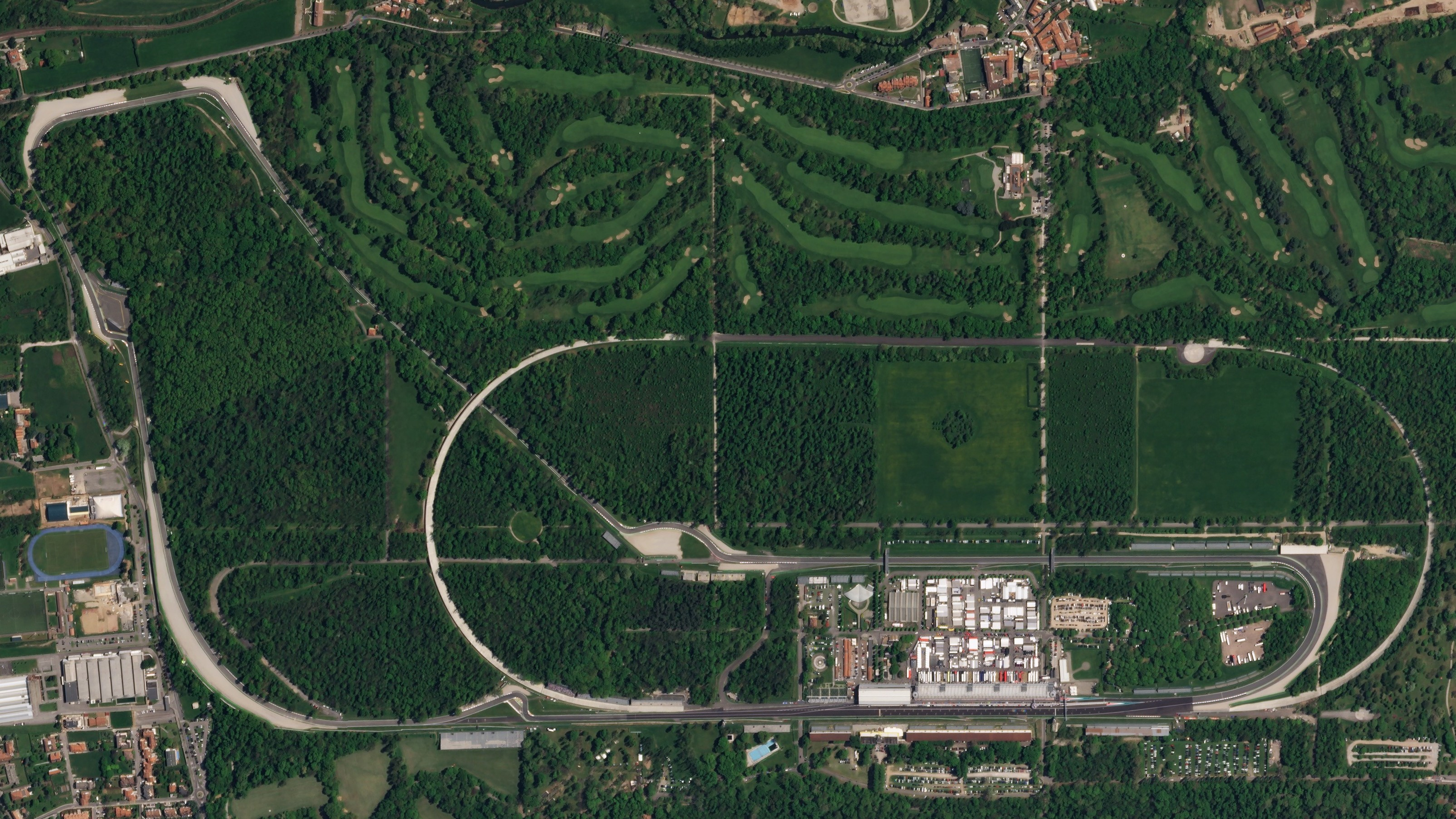
Satellite photograph of the Monza Circuit, which is located in the Royal Villa of Monza park

- Well-known racetracks include the Monza and Imola (dedicated to Enzo Ferrari and his eldest son Dino), the Mugello and Misano Adriatico circuit (dedicated to the motorcycle driver Marco Simoncelli). The Monza Circuit (Italian: Autodromo Nazionale di Monza, lit. 'National Motor Racetrack of Monza') is a historic 5.793 km (3.600 mi) racetrack near the city of Monza, north of Milan. Built in 1922 in the Royal Villa of Monza park in a woodland setting, the site has three tracks – the 5.793 km (3.600 mi) Grand Prix track, the 2.405 km (1.494 mi) Junior track, and a 4.250 km (2.641 mi) high speed oval track with steep bankings which was left unused for decades and had been decaying until it was restored in the 2010s. The circuit's biggest event is the Italian Grand Prix. With the exception of the 1980 running, the race has been hosted there since 1949. The Italian Grand Prix of Formula One is the fifth oldest surviving Grand Prix, having been held since 1921. It is also one of the two Grand Prix present in every championship since the first one in 1950. In addition to Formula One, the circuit previously hosted the 1000 km Monza, an endurance sports car race held as part of the World Sportscar Championship and the Le Mans Series. Monza also featured the unique Race of Two Worlds events, which attempted to run Formula One and USAC National Championship cars against each other. The racetrack also previously held rounds of the Grand Prix motorcycle racing (Italian motorcycle Grand Prix), WTCC, TCR International Series, Superbike World Championship, Formula Renault 3.5 Series and Auto GP. Monza currently hosts rounds of the Blancpain GT Series Endurance Cup, International GT Open and Euroformula Open Championship, as well as various local championships such as the TCR Italian Series, Italian GT Championship, Porsche Carrera Cup Italia, Italian F4 Championship, and the Monza Rally Show.

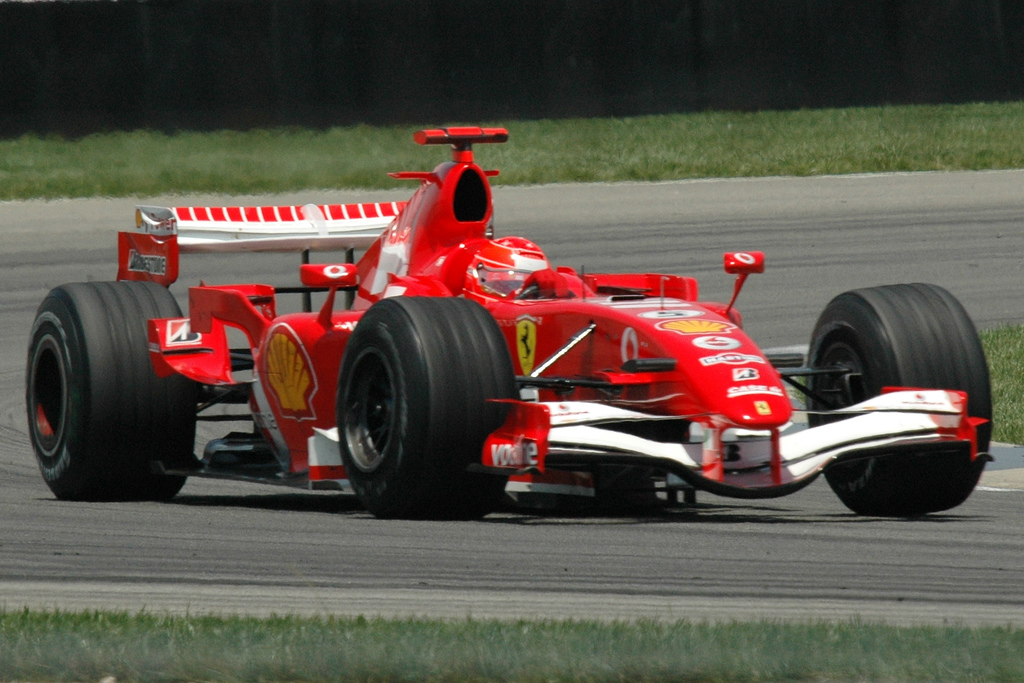
Scuderia Ferrari is the oldest surviving team in Grand Prix racing, having competed since 1948, and statistically the most successful Formula One team in history

- In auto racing (automobilismo in Italian) in Italy is extremely popular, from Formula One to endurance racing to rallies. In speed, from the first races of the 20th century, Fiat, Alfa Romeo, Maserati (the only Italian manufacturer to win the Indianapolis 500 twice), Ferrari, Abarth and Lancia, have won in the most important races (Targa Florio, Rally of Italy, Mille Miglia, 24 Hours of Le Mans, Nürburgring 24 Hours, Carrera Panamericana) and won world and continental titles in all categories. The Italian driver Giuseppe Farina, in his Alfa Romeo, won the first Formula One World Driver Championship in 1950. Italian Scuderia Ferrari is the oldest surviving team in Grand Prix racing, having competed since 1948, and statistically the most successful Formula One team in history.

Formula One team Ferrari has had great success over the many years as they have competed in the sport since 1950, when the sport first started. They have won 16 constructors' championships and 15 drivers' championships. This team is also the most successful engine manufacturer in the sport as far as wins, fastest laps and podiums are concerned. Their World Champions are Alberto Ascari, Juan Manuel Fangio, Mike Hawthorn, Phil Hill, John Surtees, Niki Lauda, Jody Scheckter, Michael Schumacher and Kimi Räikkönen. The other Italian team in F1, Scuderia AlphaTauri have two wins in the sport.

In road racing, the Targa Florio, the Mille Miglia and the Coppa Acerbo are among the oldest and most famous Italian races. In rallies, Lancia (with the Fulvia HF, Stratos, 037 and Delta) and Fiat (124 spyder, 131-Abarth), boast numerous world titles, manufacturers and drivers (Sandro Munari, Miki Biasion, Alessandro Fiorio, Alessandro Fassina), and titles continental.

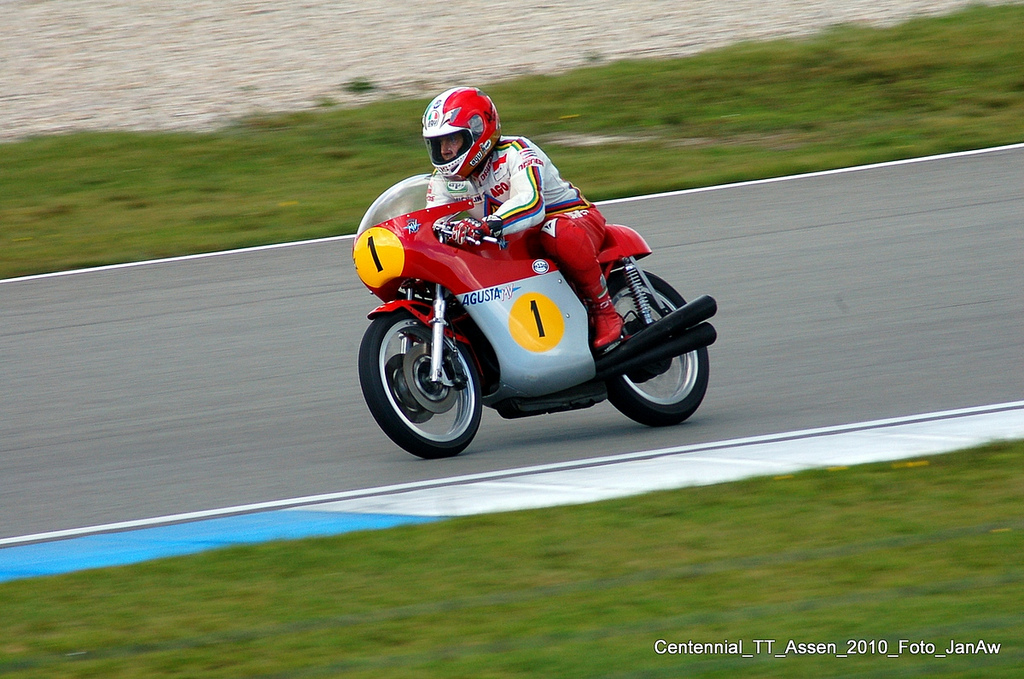
Giacomo Agostini, the most successful motorcyclist in the history of the World Championship

- In motorcycling (motociclismo in Italian), the great champions of the past, such as Umberto Masetti, Carlo Ubbiali, Tarquinio Provini and Giacomo Agostini, the most successful rider in the history of the World Championship, (15 times world champion in the 350 and 500 cc classes with 10 victories at the Tourist Trophy).

They are followed by the champions of the present, Max Biaggi, Loris Capirossi, and in particular Valentino Rossi, who has won 89 Grands Prix and 9 World Championships, being the only motorcycle racer to have won their world titles in 4 classes: one each in the 125cc, 250cc and 500cc, and six in the MotoGP. The Bianchi, Aprilia, Beta, Cagiva, Gilera, Guzzi, MV Agusta, TM Racing, Benelli e Ducati brands have won the most prestigious races and won world championships in all categories.

Tony Cairoli is the most titled Italian in Motocross, while in the women's category (WMX) Kiara Fontanesi is the most titled in the world, with six championships won, four of which were in a row.

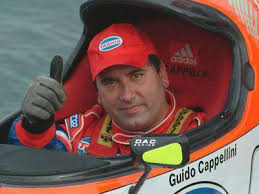
Guido Cappellini has won more world championships in powerboat Formula 1 than anyone else in history

- Powerboating (motonautica in Italian) has a long history linked to the Italian country. With the founding of the Italian Motorboat Federation in 1923, whose president was Prince Ferdinando, Duke of Genoa, this sport immediately attracted prominent personalities of the time with frequenters of the first major events including Guglielmo Marconi, Benito Mussolini and Gabriele D'Annunzio. This sport in Italy has grown in particular from the 1970s onwards and counts Angelo Moratti and subsequently Massimo Moratti among the presidents of its federation. In 1929 the Pavia-Venice Raid was born, the longest powerboat race in the world at the time. In the 1930s, Gabbriele D'Annunzio offered the Oltranza Cup for the Gardone Riviera races. The main centers of the Italian Power Force settled in the Lombardy area and in particular in Como, Milan.

Renato Molinari is one of the greatest in Italian powerboating, a driver with exceptional skills, multiple world champion in Formula 1 and in many other international categories. More recently, Guido Cappellini is a champion who, in the most important international class, Formula 1, has won more world championships than anyone else in history. In modern powerboating, Alex Carella (four-time world champion) and Francesco Cantando race among the top ranks. In addition to the motorboat Formula 1, the Aquabike World Championship (jet ski) was held in the waters of Piedmont, Lombardy, Apulia, and Sardinia.

=== Golf ===
Golf is played by over 90,000 registered players, as of 2021. There are several male and female professional players, with notable current players including Costantino Rocca, the brothers Edoardo, and Francesco Molinari, and Matteo Manassero. The most important tournament is the Italian Open. The Molinari brothers won the World Cup of Golf in 2009. The Ryder Cup 2023 will also take place in Rome for the first time.

== Equestrian sports ==
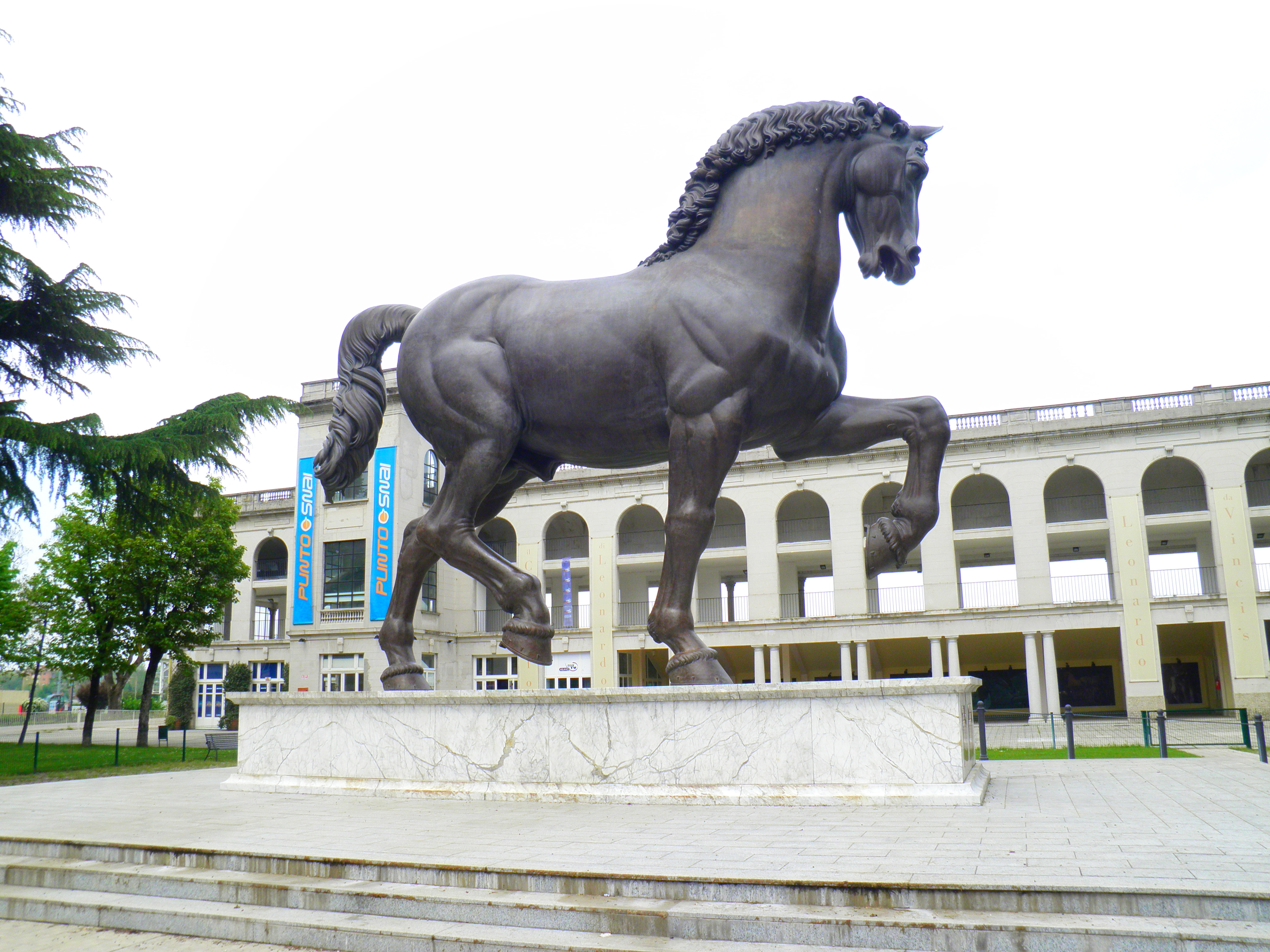
The statue of Leonardo's horse, which is located in front of the Hippodrome of San Siro in Milan

Olympic disciplines, horse racing (ippica in Italian), equestrian vaulting (volteggio a cavallo in Italian), polo (a team sport), and rodeo are participated and followed sports. There are many national and international events every year. Notable Italian equestrian are Gian Giorgio Trissino, Piero D'Inzeo, Raimondo D'Inzeo, Graziano Mancinelli and Mauro Checcoli.

Hippodrome of San Siro (Italian: Ippodromo di San Siro) is a horse racing venue in the city of Milan, which takes its name from the neighborhood of the same name in which it is located. Designed in 1913 to replace the then-used Trotter in Via Padova, the Hippodrome of San Siro was inaugurated on 25 July 1920, with its construction work being slowed down due to the World War I. In 1999 a statue of Leonardo's horse was placed in the square in front of the racecourse. It is owned by Snaitech.

Capannelle Racecourse (Italian: Ippodromo delle Capannelle) is a horse racing venue in Rome. The course was constructed in 1881, and it was rebuilt in 1926 to a design by Paolo Vietti-Violi. It was recently the venue of two Group 1 flat races – the Premio Lydia Tesio (downgraded to Group 2 in 2019) and the Premio Roma (downgraded to Group 2 in 2017). The track also stages the most valuable flat race in Italy, the Derby Italiano, which was downgraded to Group 2 status in 2009.

The Pferderennplatz Meran (Italian: Ippodromo di Maia) is an Italian racecourse, located in the town of Meran, South Tyrol, used for thoroughbred horse racing. It is one of the leading racecourses in Italy, hosting the annual Grosser Preis von Meran (Grand Prix of Meran). As Meran grew in importance as a spa town due to the visits by Empress Elisabeth of Austria and the aristocracy, the need to have organised horse races grew. In 1896, the first horse race took place and in 1900 a permanent racecourse established, which featured flat, steeplechase, and trotting races.

== Traditional sports ==
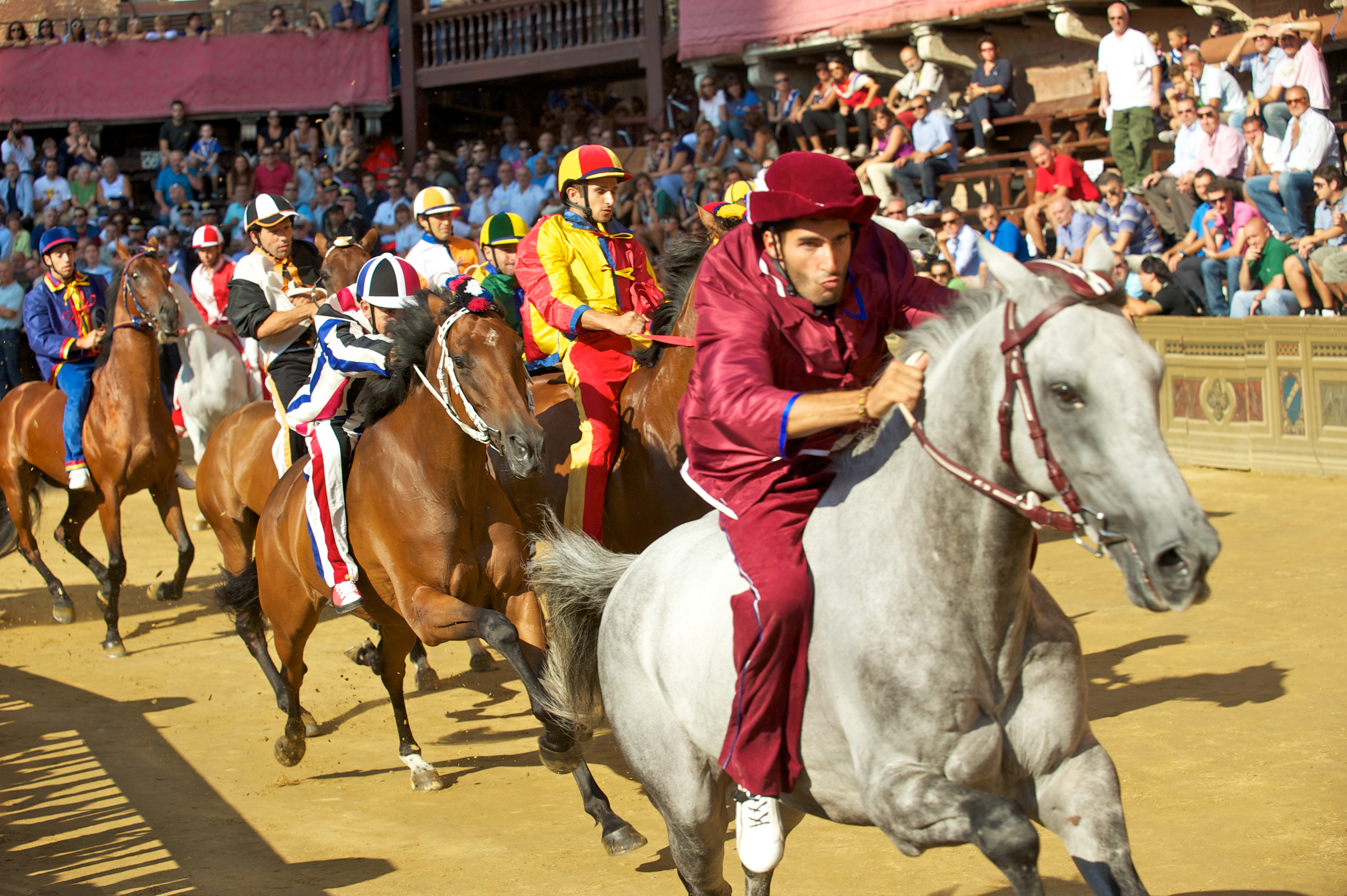
Palio di Siena attracts tourists from every continent. The first edition took place in 1633.

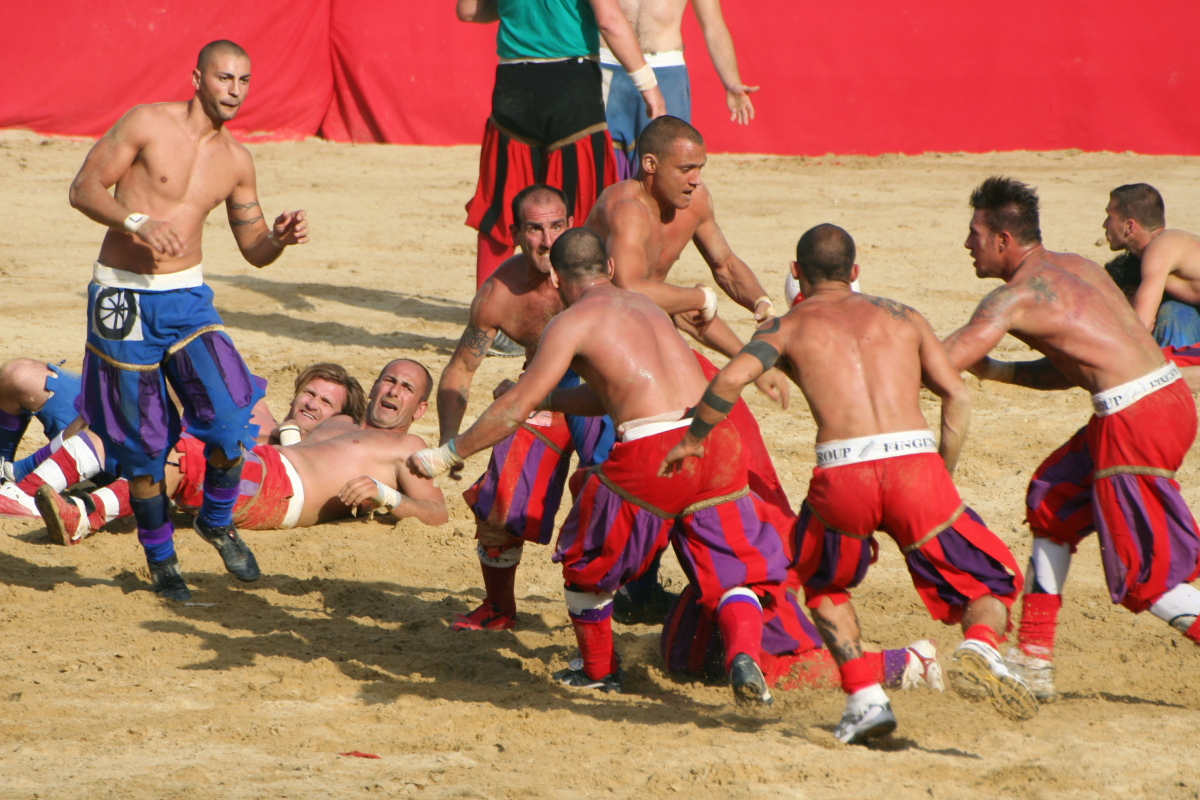
Calcio Fiorentino, that originated during the Middle Ages. This traditional sporting event attracts tourists from all over the world.

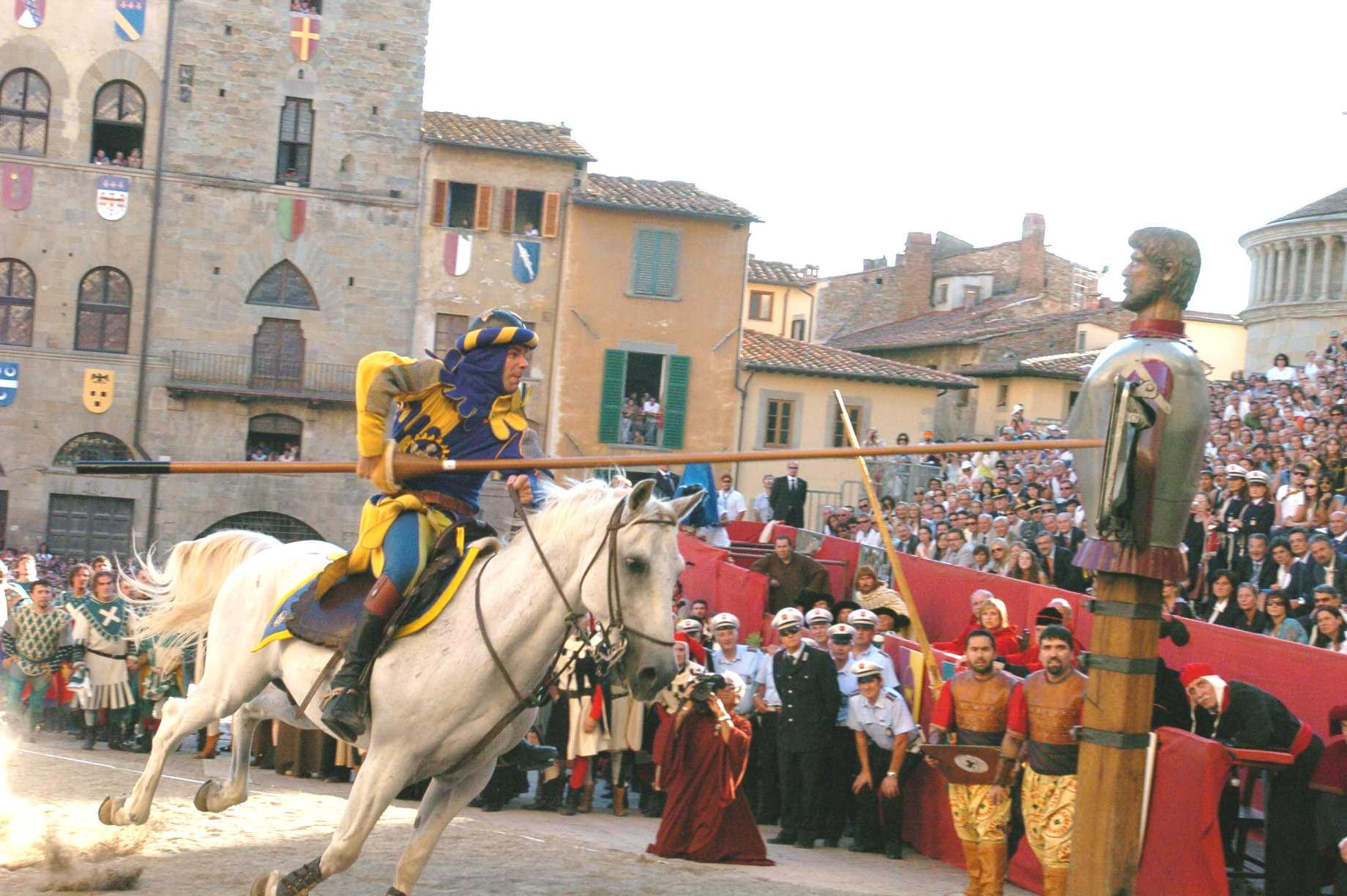
Saracen Joust of Arezzo is an ancient game of chivalry. It dates back to the Middle Ages. It attracts tourists from all over the world.

Several traditional team ball sports, called sferistici in Italian language, are played in sphaeristerium, or sferisterio in Italian language, so also in open playing fields since 1555 and when Antonio Scaino from Salò regulated pallone col bracciale. There are many modalities of these sports: pallone col bracciale, pallapugno, pallapugno leggera, palla elastica, palla, and tamburello. Professional players compete in the national circuit of tournaments and international championships.

- The traditional sport of bocce is a popular sport and pastime. Bocce is a ball sport belonging to the boules family. Developed into its present form in Italy, it is closely related to British bowls and French pétanque, with a common ancestry from ancient games played in the Roman Empire. Bocce is played around western, southern and southeastern Europe, as well as in overseas areas with historical Italian immigrant population, including Australia, North America, and South America, principally Argentina and the southern Brazilian state of Rio Grande do Sul. Initially played just by the Italian immigrants, the game has slowly become more popular with their descendants and more broadly.
- Cue sports are played on traditional billiard table in many forms: five-pins, goriziana (nine pins), and boccette. There are almost 6,000,000 amateur players and professional players who compete in national circuit of tournaments and international championships.
- Palio or annual athletic contest is followed very much, because every comune celebrates ancient events in these competitions. The most famous in the world is Palio di Siena. The first Palio di Siena took place in 1633. Ten horses and riders, bareback and dressed in the appropriate colours, represent ten of the seventeen contrade of Siena, or city wards. The Corteo Storico of Siena, a pageant to the sound of the March of the Palio, precedes the race, which attracts visitors and spectators from around the world.

The Palio di Asti is a traditional Italian festival of medieval origin that culminates with a bareback horse race. The race has been run each year since the 13th century. The earliest record, cited by Guglielmo Ventura, dates from the third quarter of the 13th century. It has taken place every year, with the exception of a period in the 1870s and a 30 year interruption in the 20th century. Since 1988, the race has taken place in a triangular 'square' in the center of Asti, the Piazza Alfieri.

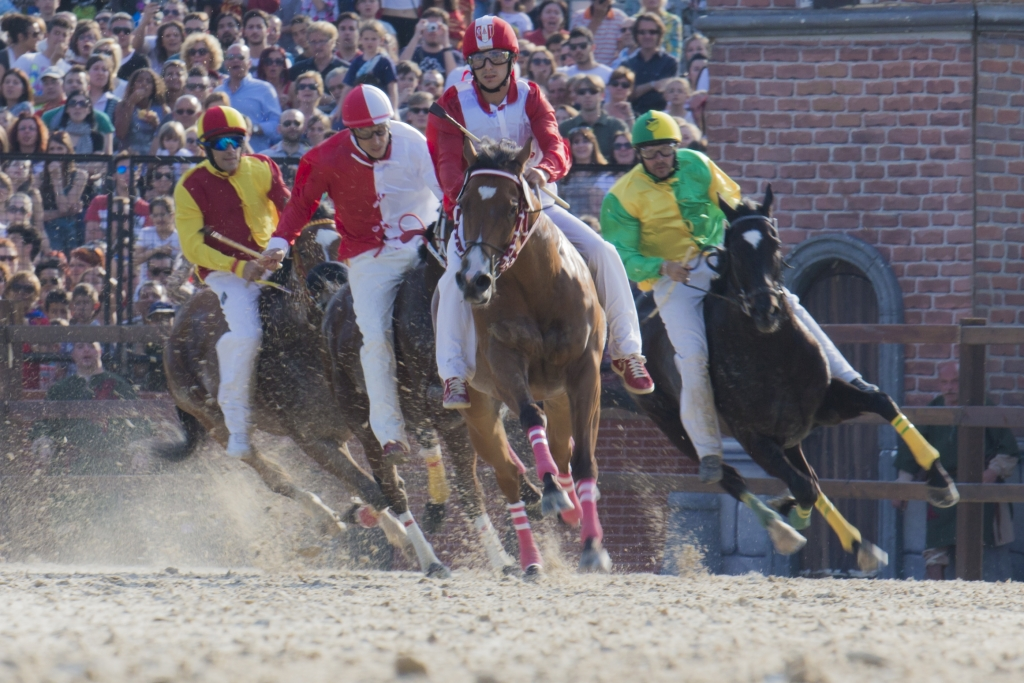
The horse race of the Palio di Legnano. In 2003 the medieval pageant of the Palio di Legnano was shown at the Columbus Day in New York City.

The Palio di Legnano is a traditional Italian festival held in the City Of Legnano, Italy, to recall the Battle of Legnano held on 29 May 1176 by the Lombard League and the Holy Roman Empire of Frederick Barbarossa. This Palio is composed by a medieval pageant and a horse race. Legnano is subdivided into eight contrade, each of which takes part both in the medieval pageant and in the horse race held at the stadio Giovanni Mari. This is considered one of the most important non-competitive events of this type in Italy. In 2003 the historic pageant was shown at the Columbus Day in New York City.
The Palio of Ferrara is a competition among the 8 neighborhoods (contrade) of the town of Ferrara, Emilia-Romagna, Italy. Four of these neighborhoods correspond to four wards located inside the medieval town fortifications. The remaining four correspond to external boroughs. After a long interruption the tradition was briefly reenacted in 1933, stopped again during World War II and eventually restarted in 1967.
The Palio di Parma is a festival that is held once a year in the northern Italian town of Parma, and traces back to the ancient "Scarlet Run"". The origin of this festival can be reconducted to 1314 as reported by Giovanni Del Giudice in the Chronicon Parmense. The festival was held every year on 15 August, from the 14th century to Napoleon's arrival in the 19th century. Starting from 1978 the competition was brought to a new life.

- Calcio Fiorentino (also referred to as calcio storico "historic football") is an early form of football (soccer and rugby) that originated during the Middle Ages in Italy. Once widely played, the sport is thought to have started in the Piazza Santa Croce in Florence. There it became known as the giuoco del calcio fiorentino ("Florentine kick game") or simply calcio, which is now also the name for association football in the Italian language. The game may have started as a revival of the Roman sport of harpastum. This traditional sporting event attracts tourists from all over the world.
- Saracen Joust of Arezzo is an ancient game of chivalry. It dates back to the Middle Ages. It was born as an exercise for military training. This tournament was regularly held in Arezzo between the 16th century and the end of the 17th century, when memorable jousts in baroque style were organized. The joust – which became a typical tradition of Arezzo at the beginning of the 17th century – declined progressively during the 18th century and eventually disappeared, at least in its "noble" version. After a brief popular revival between the 18th and 19th century, the joust was interrupted after 1810 to reappear only in 1904 in the wake of the Middle Ages reappraisal operated by Romanticism. Finally, the joust was definitely restored in 1931 as a form of historical re-enactment set in the 14th century, and quickly acquired a competitive character. Saracen Joust attracts tourists from all over the world.
- The Giostra della Quintana was a historical jousting tournament in Foligno, central Italy. It was revived as a modern festival in 1946. The tournament event takes place in June (1st Challenge) during a Saturday night and September (the counter-challenge) the 2nd or 3rd Sunday of September, and is proceeded each time by a festival with a 17th-century costumed parade. The definition of Quintana comes from the 5th road of the Roman military camps, where the soldiers were trained in lance fighting. This is the origin of the tournament's name, but the first definition and documented "Quintana" as a knights' jousting tournament during a festival, dates back to 1448. In 1613 the build-up to the Quintana tournament included the carnival festivals we see today. Giostra della Quintana attracts tourists from all over the world.

== Italy at the Olympics ==
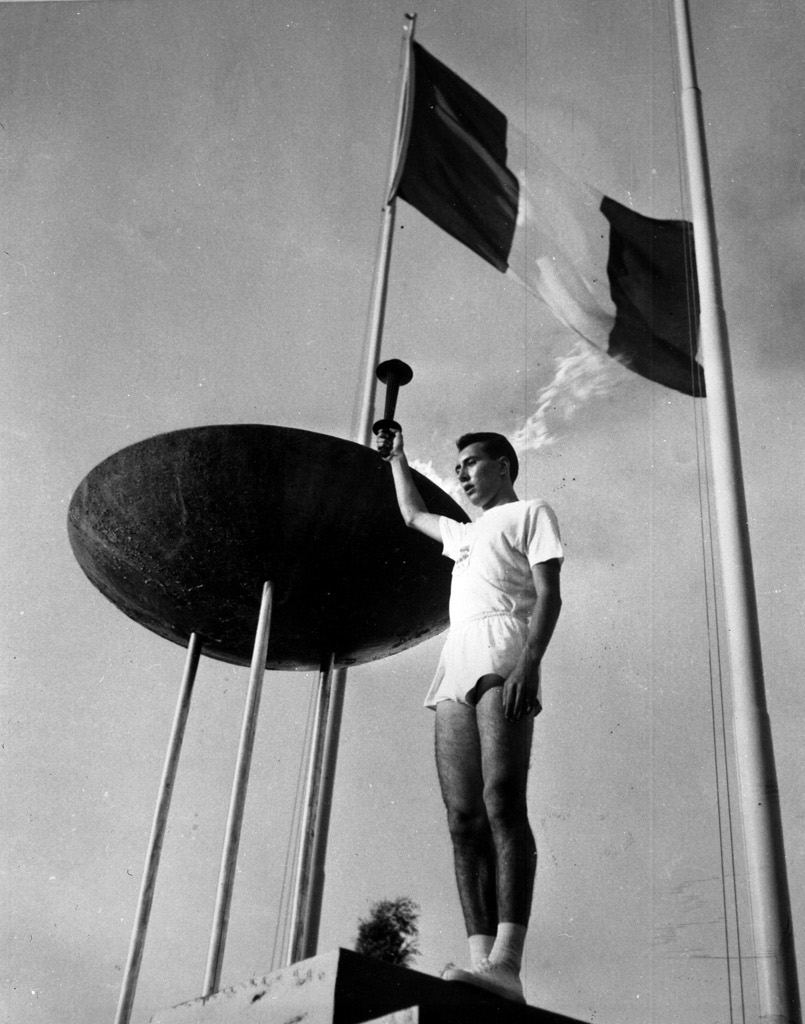
Giancarlo Peris lighting the 1960 Summer Olympics flame under the flag of Italy at Stadio Olimpico in Rome.

Historically, Italy has been successful in the Olympic Games, taking part from the first Olympiad and in 47 Games out of 48, not having officially participated in the 1904 Summer Olympics.

Italy has hosted the Games on four occasions:

- 1956 Winter Olympics in Cortina d'Ampezzo.
- 1960 Summer Olympics in Rome.
- 2006 Winter Olympics in Turin.
- 2026 Winter Olympics in Milan and Cortina d'Ampezzo.

As 2022, Italian athletes have a cache of 618 medals at Summer Olympic Games, and a cache of 141 medals at Winter Olympic Games. Italy has won a total of 259 gold medals which makes them the 6th most successful country in Olympic history, after the USA, the Soviet Union, Germany, Great Britain and France. Italy has the sixth highest medal total of all time with 759. Italy has the third longest medaling streak after Sweden and Finland. Italy has medaled in 40 straight Olympic games, starting with the 1936 Summer Olympics.

Italy had finished the Summer Olympic Games: 2nd in 1932, 3rd in 1960, 4th in 1936, and 5th in 1924, 1928, 1948, 1952, 1956, 1964, 1980 and 1984. In the Winter Olympic Games, Italy has finished 4th in 1968 and 1994, and 6th in 1952 and 1992. Italy ranks 1st all-time in fencing, 2nd in cycling, 3rd in luge, 4th in boxing and shooting, 5th in alpine skiing, and 6th in bobsled, cross-country skiing and short track speed skating.

The Italian National Olympic Committee (Italian: Comitato Olimpico Nazionale Italiano, CONI) was created in 1914 and recognized in 1915. Within Italy, CONI recognizes 44 national sports federations, 19 associate sports disciplines, 15 promotional sports organizations, and 19 organizations for the betterment of sports. In total 95,000 sports clubs with 11,000,000 members are recognized. Its 2016 annual budget is 412,900,000 euros which is primarily funded by the Italian government.

== Walk of Fame of Italian sport ==
The Walk of Fame of Italian sport is the Walk of Fame of the Italian sport, inaugurated by Italian National Olympic Committee (CONI) on 7 May 2015. It is a list of 125 Italian all-time champions, which has been implemented on five occasions (five new entries in 2015, 2016 and 2021, seven in 2018, three in 2019), from the initial 100 names.

The Walk of Fame of Italian sport is a road path in Rome with plaques dedicated to former Italian sports athletes who have distinguished themselves internationally. It runs between the Avenue of the Olympics and the Stadio Olimpico in the Olympic Park of the Foro Italico of the capital.

== See also ==
- Borella, a traditional three pin bowling
- Sport in Sicily
