= Borella (game) =

Borella is a bowling game played in northern Italy since at least the 16th century.

Borella was played in streets and parks around Treviso by ordinary people. Borella is still played at the Club Marconi, Bossley Park, New South Wales, Australia.

Borella is similar to 'three-pin bowling', but unlike ten-pin bowling where the pins are in rows, the three borella pins are placed in a single file behind each other. Borella is traditionally played with a large ball made of wood from a maple tree. The three wooden pins or skittles, called sòni, are about 60 cm high. To play the game a player stands 30 metres away from the pins, runs and throws the ball –a bit like a cricket bowler– to strike them at speed.
