= Gery Bavetta =

Italian Thai boxer and kickboxer

- Born: January 2, 1988 (age 38); Ribera, Italy
- Nationality: Italian
- Weight: 54.0 kg (119.0 lb; 8.50 st)
- Division: Bantamweight; Super bantamweight
- Style: Kickboxing, Muay Thai
- Fighting out of: Thailand, World
- Team: SMT Team (Universal Gym Cacciato)
- Years active: 2004-present

Kickboxing record
- Total: 70
- Wins: 53
- By knockout: 19
- Losses: 16
- By knockout: 1
- Draws: 1
- Last updated on: January 21, 2018

Gery Bavetta (born January 2, 1988) is an Italian Thai boxer and kickboxer.

He was Italian Amateur Kombat League Champion, Amateur Kombat League World Champion, and two-time Italian Professional Kombat League Champion. The World Boxing Council Muaythai currently ranks him 20th place in the world in his category.

He is currently undefeated in Italy and number 1 in his category (53 kg).

== Career ==
Bavetta began his career at age 16 at the Combat Gym of Ninni Ruvolo, where he practiced mostly K-1, but became passionate about amateur-level Muay Thai. In 2007 he moved to Pattaya, Thailand, together with his friend and fellow boxer Alfonso Vella, where he trained in the Pattaya Kombat Gym camp of Italian Christian Daghio.

He returned to Thailand in 2008, to the camp managed by the OneSongchai group. There he trained with a former champion of Lumpinee Stadium, Yod Buangarm, who took him to the Luk Barn Yai camp, where he trained and resided for a few months.

On his return to Italy, he trained with Massimiliano Cacciato at the Universal Gym in Racalmuto. After two more study trips to Thailand, he began his first amateur matches in the Kombat League Federation, winning the Italian MTA Kombat League title in Potenza Picena. Bavetta later won the Italian Professional Kombat League title in Racalmuto. He then won the World OneSongchai MTA Kombat League title in Tivoli.

On September 11, 2010, he made his professional debut in Birmingham against England’s Damien Trainor. In the following years he took part in the King's Cup in Thailand, and he trained at Luk Barn Yai and Sitsonpeenong.

== Political commitment ==
Bavetta is a dedicated member and militant of the Communist Party.

== Titles ==
- Italian Amateur Kombat League Champion
- Two-time Italian Professional Kombat League Champion
- OneSongchai Amateur Kombat League World Champion
