= Heinz Grill =

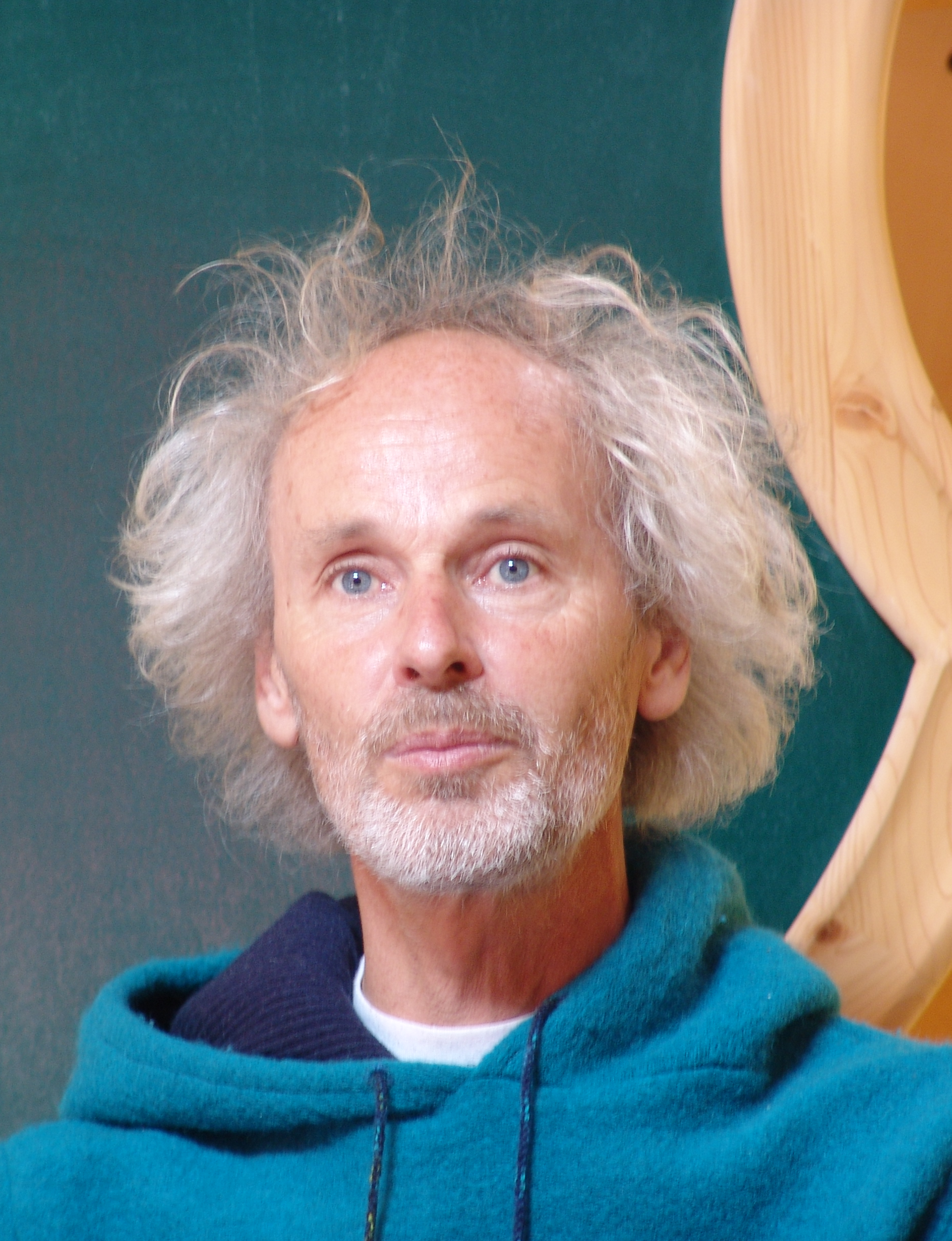
- In 2012
- Born: May 24, 1960 (age 65); Wasserburg am Inn, Bavaria
- Occupations: Mountaineer, author, yoga teacher
- Website: heinz-grill.de/en/

Heinz Grill is a German mountaineer, author, and yoga teacher. He has opened many new climbing routes in the Alps and Dolomites.

In 1977 he won the Golden Carabiner award from the German Alpine Club. In 2012 he shared the Silla Ghedina prize for best climbing in the Dolomites.

== Climbing ==
Heinz Grill began to climb from the age of twelve. At the age of seventeen he soloed the Pumprisse route on the Fleischbank in the Wilder Kaiser, an undertaking that caused a sensation and scandal, because it was the first solo ascent of the first route in the Alps officially rated as 7th grade. Following this undertaking (considered by traditionalists a provocation because it was daring but dangerous), Heinz Grill was excluded from the Alpenverein (Alpine Club) of Wasserburg. However, in 1977 he was awarded the Golden Carabiner prize for his solo ascents in the Wilder Kaiser.

During the years 1975 - 1990 he climbed the rock routes alone, without ropes and safety devices. These include: in the Karwendel in Austria on Punta Laliderer the Rebitsch route, on the Pilastro Lalider the Rebitsch route; in the Sella Group on Piz Ciavazes the via Soldà, the routes of Armando Aste (for example the Ezio Polo) on the Marmolada, la Via Ideale, via Canna d’Organo and via Comici in Civetta; and the Regular Route on the Half Dome in Yosemite. In this period he made himself known as a daring solo climber. In 1988 he began working as a writer; in 2000 he moved to live in Italy in Arco, Trentino.

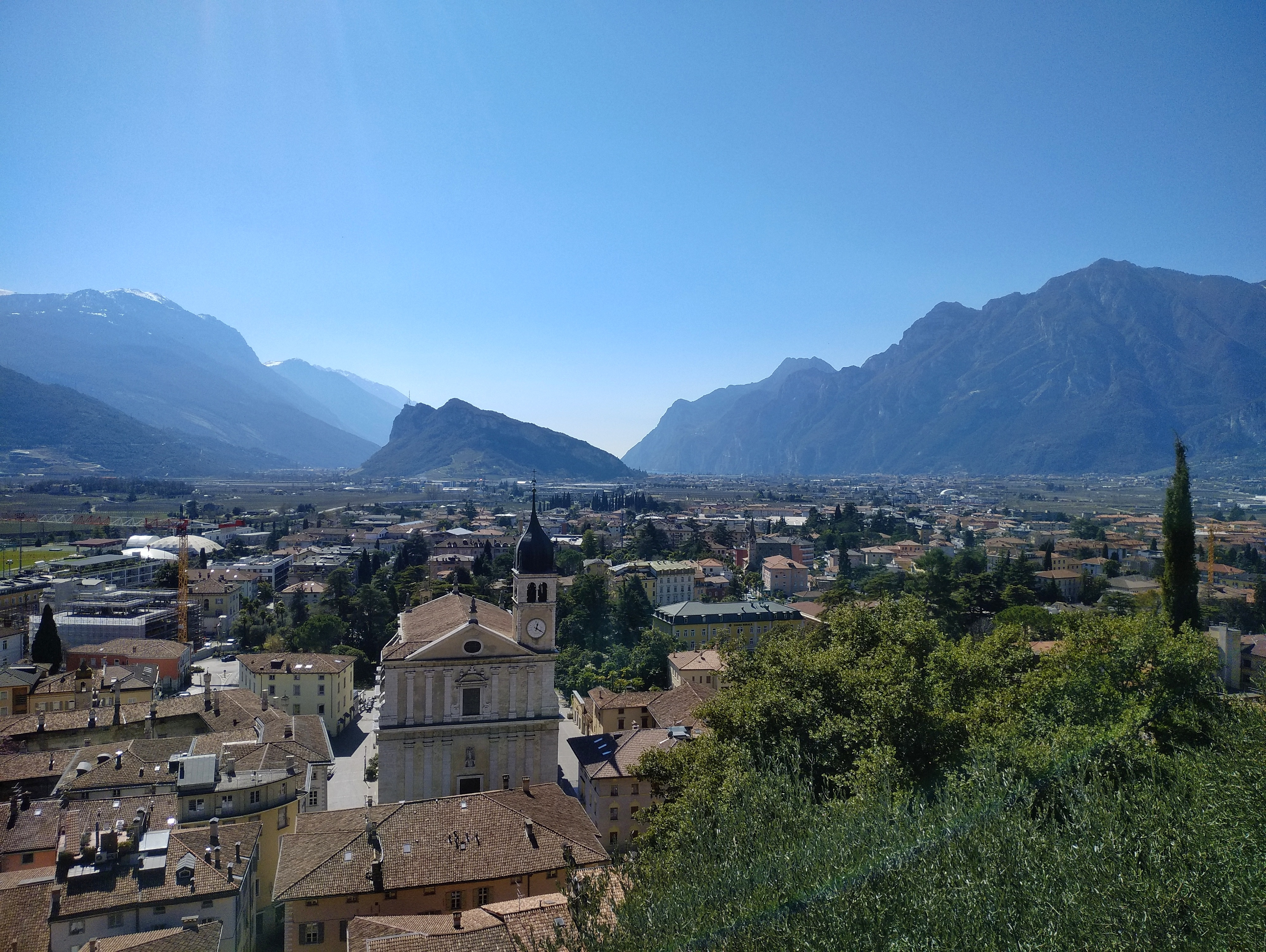
The mountainous setting of Arco, Trentino, Grill's home from 2000 onwards. He has opened many new routes in the area.

From 2006 to 2016 he opened about 80 routes in the Sarca Valley in Trentino; these have increased the infrastructure of Arco and its surroundings. Heinz Grill's routes in the Sarca Valley are called "rhythmic routes" and have a character between sports and mountaineering climbing. Heinz Grill stated that the routes were opened from below in a mountaineering style, but were later "sculpted and created" through extensive cleaning work.

He has created 30 new rock routes in the Dolomites, for example in the Pale di San Martino on the Cima Immink the Via Internazionale and the Via Nuova, in the Brenta Dolomites on the Croz dell'Altissimo the Via in Memoria of Samuele Scalet on the Pale di San Lucano, on the Spiz di Lagunaz the Pilastro Massarotto route, and the Via Collaborazione (awarded by Silla Ghedina the most beautiful Dolomite route of 2012), in Vallaccia. among many others.

In addition to appreciation, Grill's mountaineering work has been criticised: the routes he opened, according to some, would in fact only appear to be mountaineering, but in reality were banal, with dug holds, overloaded with coiled ropes and stops made with wood (which could be considered dangerous).

== Yoga ==
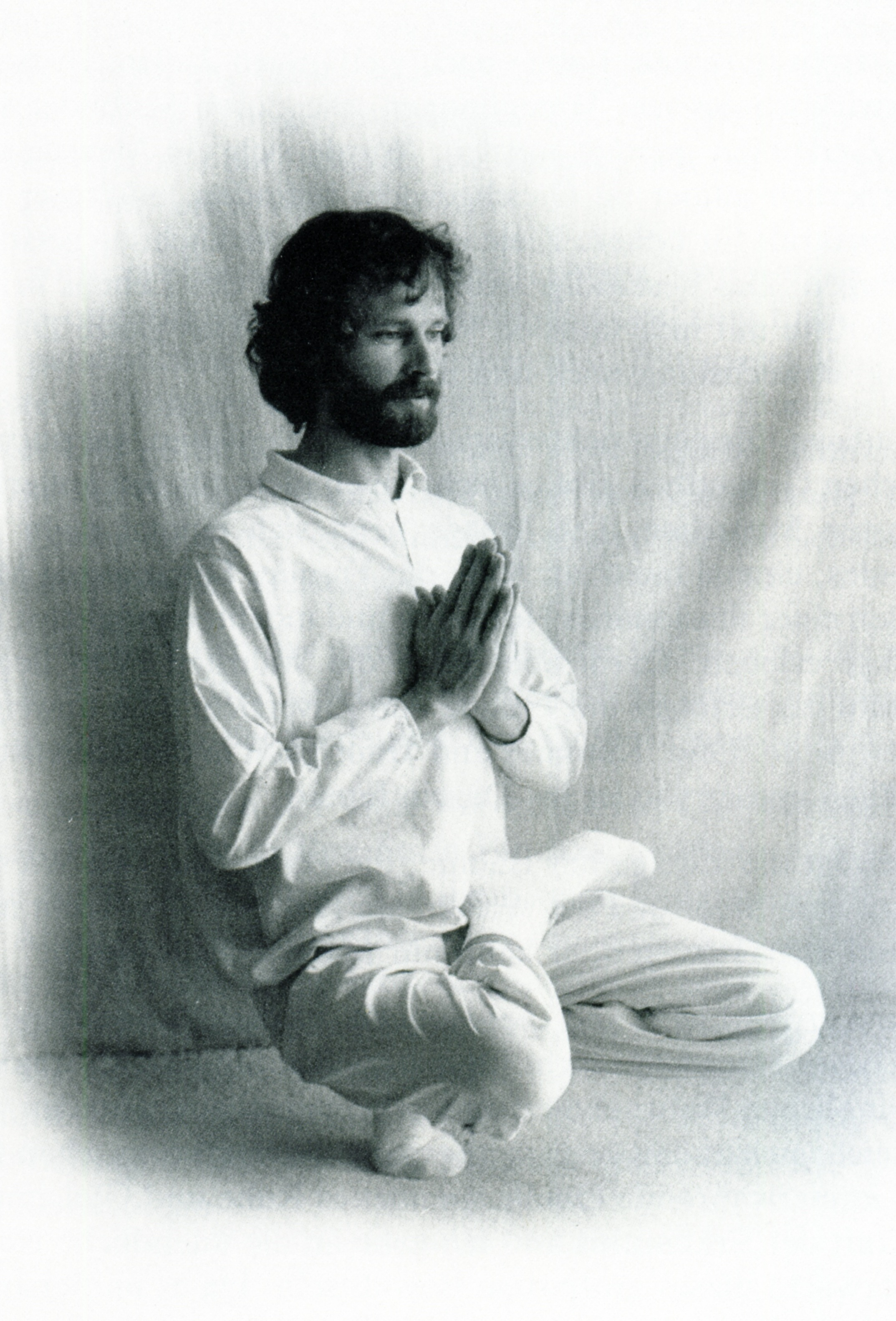
Grill in 1992 in the yoga pose Padangushtasana, Toe Stand

Grill teaches and writes about yoga and meditation in the mountainous northern province of Trentino, Italy.

== Awards and distinctions ==
In 1977 Grill received the Golden Carabiner award from the German Alpine Club of Wasserburg.

The Silla Ghedina prize for the best climbing in the Dolomites 2012 was awarded to Grill with his companions Franz and Martin Heiss and Florian Kluckner, for the Collaboration route.

In 2017 Grill was nominated as a Scholar of the Italian Academic Climbing Club.

== Principal works ==
Grill writes on subjects including medicine, yoga, architecture, spirituality, philosophy, and mountaineering. He has published over 100 works in German. Some of his works have been translated into Dutch, English, and Italian.

=== Climbing ===
In English

- 2011 Climbing Routes in the Sarca Valley: A rhythmical experience in climbing. Teola Idea Montagna Editoria e Alpinismo.

=== Yoga and spirituality ===
In English

- 1996: Harmony in Breathing, Heinrich Hugendubel Verlag.
- 2004: The spiritualising of the body: an artistic and spiritual path with yoga. Lammers-Koll Verlag.
- 2005: The soul dimension of yoga: a practical foundation for a path of spiritual practice. Lammers-Koll Verlag.
- 2007: Nutrition and the inner sense of giving the spiritual meaning of food. Lammers-Koll Verlag.
- 2012: Enriching the Life and Health of the Chest Area. Lammers-Koll-Verlag.

== Bibliography ==
- Alessandro Beber, doloMITICHE-opere d'arte a cielo aperto, Vividolomiti, 2014, pp. 100–111, ISBN 978-88-907887-6-5.
- Mauro Bernardi, Arrampicare in Val Gardena, Dolomiti, Athesia, 2002, p. 222, ISBN 978-88-6839-065-5.
- Dante Colli, "Nella Valle del Sarca- Colloquio con il filosofo-alpinista Heinz Grill", in La Rivista, May–June 2010, pp. 26–29.
- Karl Elberg, Vom Wesen des Berges, Lammers Koll Verlag, 2001, ISBN 3-935925-80-8.
- Florian Kluckner, Arco plaisir, Ideamontagna, 2016, ISBN 978-88-97299-78-3.
- Diego Filippi, Arco pareti. Vie classiche, moderne e sportive in Valle del Sarca, Versante Sud, ISBN 978-88-96634-76-9.
- Maurizio Giordani, Marmolada, Parete Sud, Versante Sud, Milano, 2007, p. 24. ISBN 88-87890-53-6.
- Riccadonna Graziano, Nel “buen retiro” di Lundo Grill sposa roccia e yoga, in Trentino, 18 October 2015.
- Gerd Heidorn, "Felsenphilosoph Heinz Grill- Das Spiel mit dem Rhythmus", in Panorama, 2013, pp. 92–95.
- Lorenzo Massarotto, Le vie, Luca Visentini, 2013, Pordenone, ISBN 978-88-88099-11-8.
- Ivo Rabanser, Arrampicare in Valle del Sarca. Vie classiche ad Arco e dintorni, Athesia, 2013, ISBN 978-88-8266-924-9.
- Ivo Rabanser, "Civetta", Club Alpino Italiano, 2012, ISBN 978-88-365-5097-5.
- Georg Schmid, Kirchen Sekten Religionen, Theologischer Verlag Zürich, 2003, p. 251- 252 ISBN 978-3-290-17215-2.
- Richard Stumhofer, Heinz Grill- un solitarista molto ardito in Der Bergsteiger, Issue 5, 1979, pp. 281–86.
- Reto Zbinden, Jubiläums Textbuch, Yoga Journal Verlag, Zürich, 2008, Pag. 524 ISBN 3-931172-27-9.
