= Walter Bonatti =

Italian mountaineer and alpinist (1930–2011)

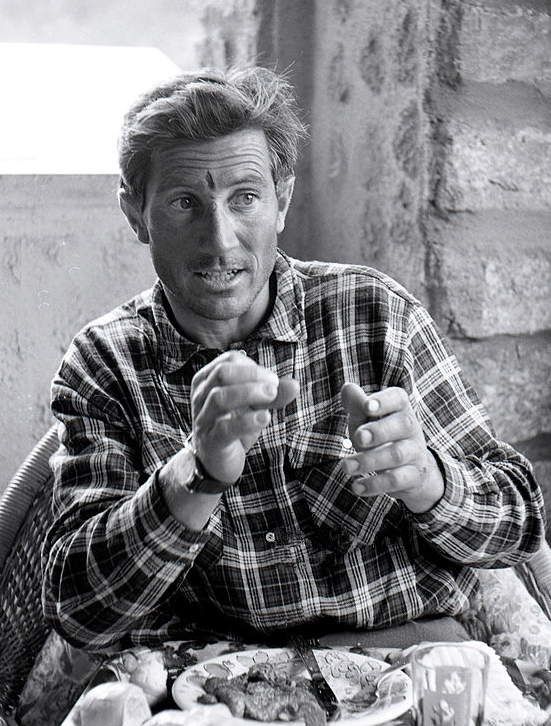
- Walter Bonatti in 1964

Personal information
- Nationality: Italian
- Born: 22 June 1930 Bergamo, Lombardy, Italy
- Died: 13 September 2011 (aged 81) Rome, Lazio, Italy

Climbing career
- Type of climber: Mountaineer
- First ascents: Gasherbrum IV
- Major ascents: List of mountaineering achievements
- Known for: Solo climb of Aiguille du Dru
- Updated on 18 March 2013

Walter Bonatti (Italian pronunciation: [ˈvalter boˈnatti]; 22 June 1930 – 13 September 2011) was an Italian mountaineer, alpinist, explorer and journalist. He was noted for many climbing achievements, including a solo climb of a new alpine climbing route on the south-west pillar of the Aiguille du Dru in August 1955, the first ascent of Gasherbrum IV in 1958, and, in 1965, the first solo climb in winter of the North face of the Matterhorn on the mountain's centenary year of its first ascent.

Immediately after his solo climb on the Matterhorn, Bonatti announced his retirement from professional climbing at the age of 35, and after 17 years of climbing activity. He authored many mountaineering books and spent the remainder of his career travelling off the beaten track as a reporter for the Italian magazine Epoca. He died on 13 September 2011 in Rome of pancreatic cancer, aged 81, and was survived by his life partner, the actress Rossana Podestà.

Famed for his climbing panache, Bonatti attempted and succeeded in barely-known and technically difficult climbs in the Alps, Himalayas, and Patagonia. In 2009, Bonatti was awarded the first-ever Piolet d'Or Lifetime Achievement Award. He is widely considered as being one of the greatest climbers in history.

== Life and career ==
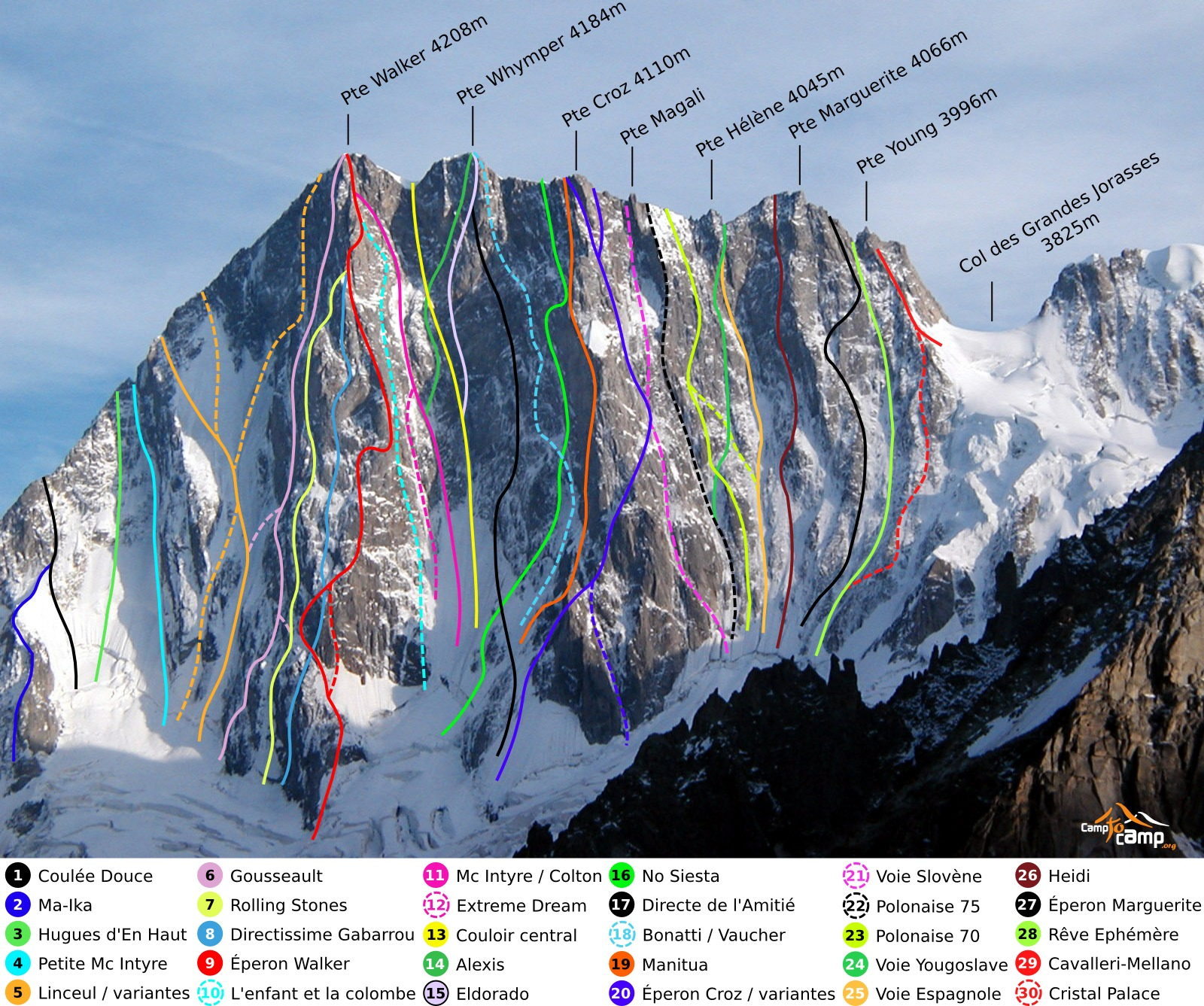
North Face of the Grandes Jorasses. The Walker Spur, climbed by Bonatti in 1949, is number 9.

An only child, born in Bergamo, in Lombardy, Italy, Bonatti spent his childhood in the Po Valley dreaming of adventure. WWII left his working-class family impoverished. His father was a fabric merchant, Bonatti took to gymnastics through a sports association in Monza. The physical strength and balance he developed here would prove to be crucial skills for Bonatti as a climber. At age 18, Bonatti started climbing on the Grigna, a rocky mountain of the Italian Prealps,where he spent the summer of 1948 climbing intensively.

In 1949, within a year of starting to climb, he made the first repetition of the Oppio-Colnaghi-Guidi Route, a challenging climb on the South Face of the Croz dell'Altissimo 250 metres (820 ft) long and rated UIAA V+. Soon after followed the climb of the Bramani-Castiglioni Route on the North-West face of Piz Badile, a second repetition of the Ratti-Vitali route on the West Face of the Aiguille Noire de Peuterey, a rocky mountain in the Italian part of the Mont Blanc massif and the fourth ascent of the Walker Spur on the North Face of the Grandes Jorasses in only two days and with limited equipment. This last route had been climbed for the first time in 1938 by famous climber Riccardo Cassin and consists of 1,200 metres (3,900 ft) of rock-climbing with UIAA difficulty of IV and V and one step of VI+. The climb of the Walker Spur by the Cassin route is exposed to stone fall and ranks together with the North Face of the Eiger as one of the major climbs achieved in the Alps between the two world wars.

Bonatti had limited financial means and his first climbs were done with very basic equipment, including pitons that he had manufactured personally. During the first years, Bonatti worked in a steel mill and climbed on Sunday directly after the Saturday night shift. In less than two years since he started climbing, Bonatti had already joined the restricted circle of the best Italian climbers.

=== The early climbs ===
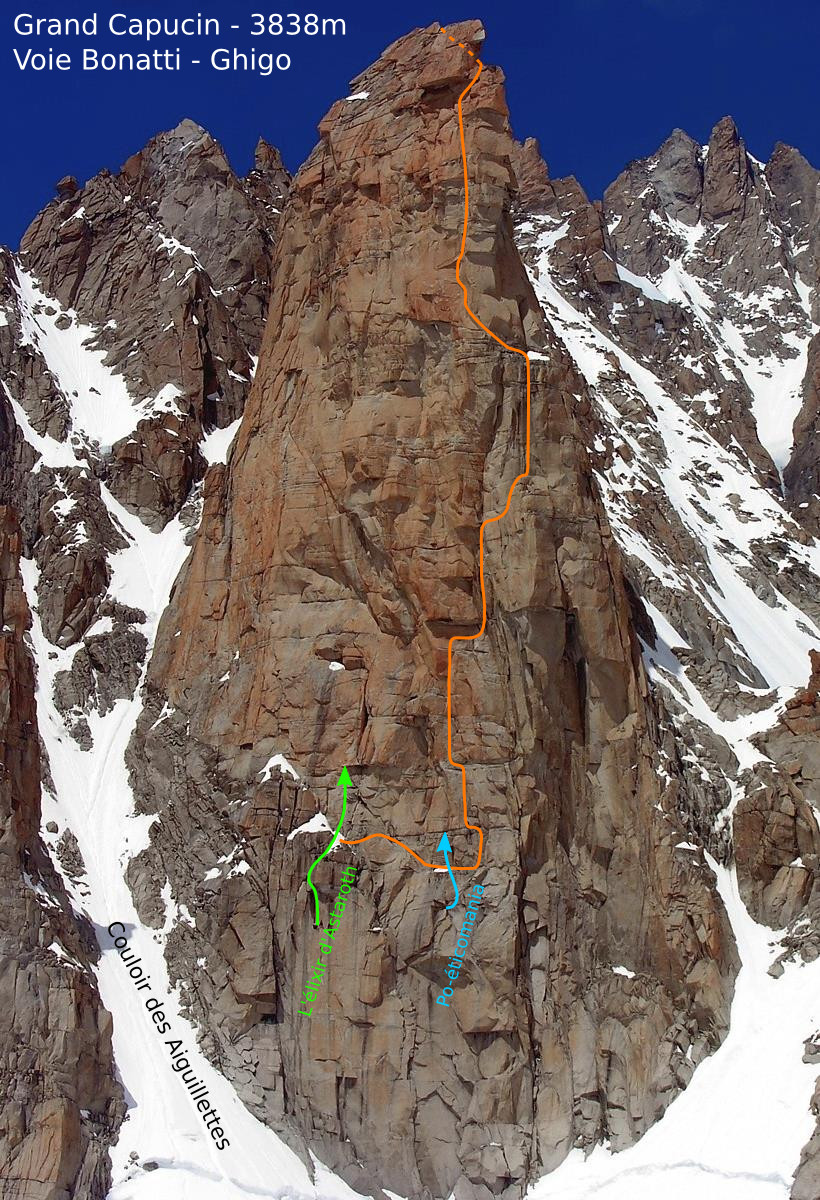
Grand Capucin

In 1950, he tried what would have been his first major achievement: the first ascent of the east face of the Grand Capucin, an unclimbed face of red granite in the group of Mont Blanc, together with climber Camillo Barzaghi. They climbed a few pitches before being forced back by a storm. Three weeks later, together with Luciano Ghigo, another attempt was made. After three days of climbing and three hanging bivouacs, they had reached the most difficult section of the climb, a vertical section of 40 metres (130 ft) of smooth granite, but a storm again forced them to retreat.

In 1951 the same team tried again to climb the east face of the Grand Capucin. They started the climb on 20 July in good weather conditions. In two days they got close to the summit but again the weather worsened and they had to spend a day on the face in a hanging bivouac. The next day, despite bad weather conditions, they managed to successfully complete the climb and return safely to the hut. A few years later, in 1955 and after completing the climb himself, Hermann Buhl stated that it was the "most difficult granite climb in an absolute sense". In 1952, Bonatti and Roberto Bignami opened the first route on the south ridge of the Aiguille Noire de Peuterey.

In February 1953, together with Carlo Mauri he made the first winter ascent of the north face of the legendary Cima Ovest di Lavaredo. A few days later they made the first repetition of the winter ascent of the north face of Cima Grande, climbed already in 1938 by Fritz Kasparek. Before the end of the 1953 winter, with Roberto Bignami, and in only two days, Bonatti opened on Matterhorn a new direct variant on the Furggen Ridge. In the summer of 1953, he achieved the first climb of Mont Blanc by the north gully from the Peuterey Col.

In 1954 Bonatti was assigned to the Alpine regiment and for four days each week he trained men to climb; for the other three, he was allowed to head off into the mountains on his own. With all his achievements he had become an unavoidable selection for the Italian assault on K2, which would rebound to his disadvantage.

=== K2 ===
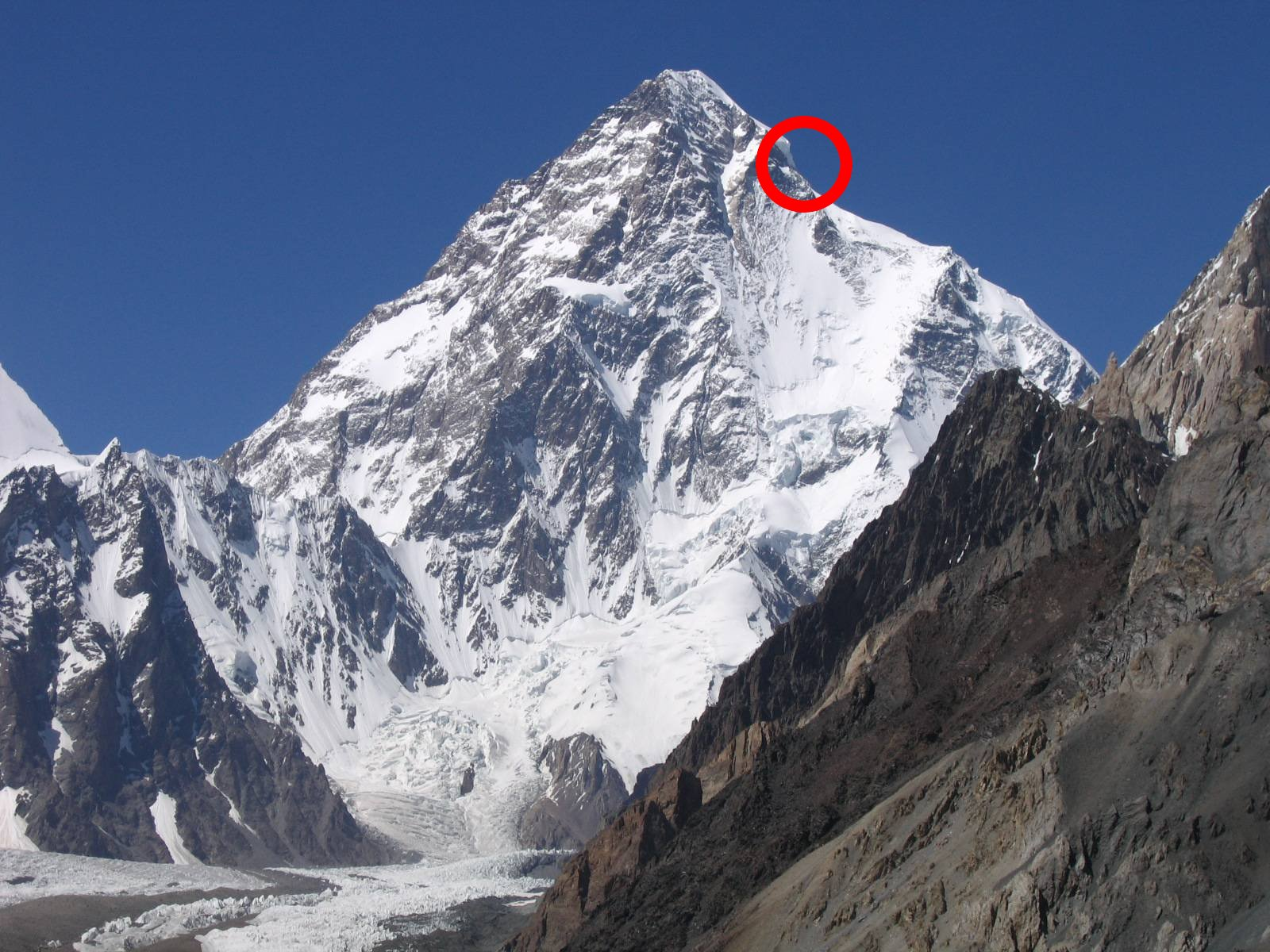
Position of Camp IX and of the unplanned Bonatti-Mehdi open bivouac

Bonatti was the youngest participant of the 1954 Italian expedition to K2 organized by Ardito Desio. As Bonatti said afterward at the age of 80: It was the era when European countries picked off the 8,000m peaks in the same way they had colonies 100 years previously. On 31 July, two members of the Italian team, Lino Lacedelli and Achille Compagnoni, reached the summit, securing the first ascent of K2 for the Italian team. However, years after the expedition Bonatti found himself accused and at the center of a bitter controversy based on conflicting accounts of events that occurred during the ascent. 53 years later, the Italian Alpine Club officially recognize that both Lacedelli and Compagnoni lied in their account of the ascent and that Bonatti's version of the facts was accurate.

Along with Hunza climber Amir Mehdi, Bonatti had the task to carry oxygen cylinders up to Lacedelli and Compagnoni at Camp IX for a summit attempt. However, Compagnoni had decided to place Camp IX at a higher location than previously agreed with Bonatti. Bonatti and Mehdi reached a point close to Camp IX but by this time night had fallen and Mehdi's condition had deteriorated. Bonatti knew that he and Mehdi needed the shelter of a tent to survive a night at this altitude without risk of frostbite or worse, but the Camp IX tent was placed at the end of a dangerous traverse across icy slopes and visibility was too reduced to get there. Bonatti saw that Mehdi was in no condition to climb further or make a return to Camp VIII and was reluctantly forced to endure an open bivouac without a tent or sleeping bag at 8,100 metres (26,600 ft) and −50 °C (−58 °F). This cost Mehdi his toes, while Bonatti was lucky to survive the terrible night unharmed. Compagnoni gave the explanation that his decision to change the agreed site of the camp was to avoid an overhanging serac, but Bonatti accused both (and the facts would later support his claim) of having deliberately changed the location to make it impossible for Bonatti and Mehdi to remain overnight at that height, so there would be no way they too could attempt the summit themselves.

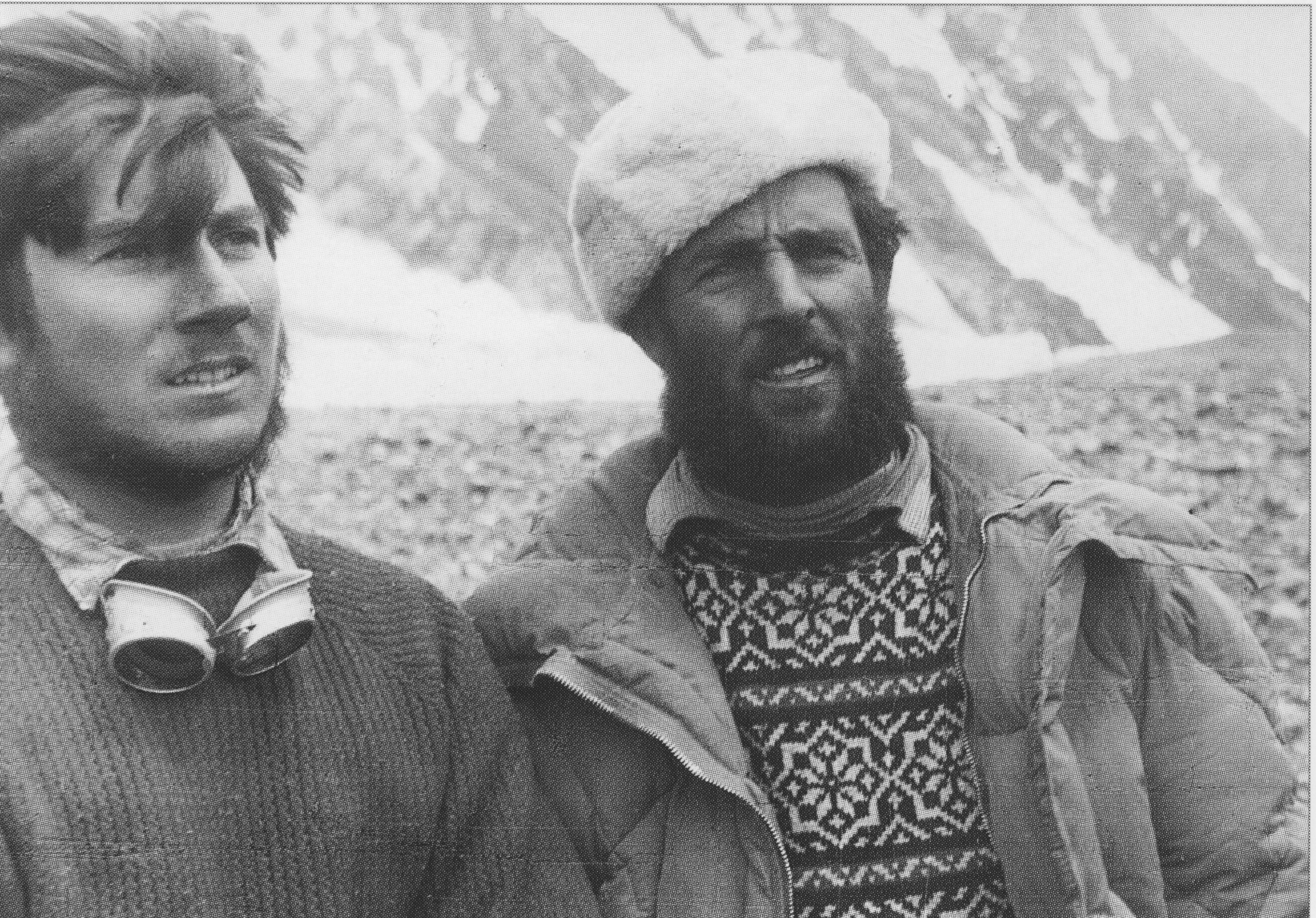
Bonatti (left) and Erich Abram at base camp during the K2 expedition 1954

Bonatti was in the best physical condition of all the climbers and the natural choice to make the summit attempt, but Ardito Desio selected Lacedelli and Compagnoni. Had Bonatti joined the summit team he would likely not have used supplemental oxygen. Therefore, Lacedelli and Compagnoni's oxygen-assisted climb could have been eclipsed. Although the Bonatti-Mehdi forced bivouac was not anticipated, Compagnoni intended to discourage Bonatti from reaching the tent and participating in the final summit climb. On the morning of 31 July, after Bonatti and Mehdi had already begun their descent to the safety of Camp VIII, Compagnoni and Lacedelli retrieved the oxygen cylinders left at the bivouac site and reached the summit of K2 at 6.10pm. Ardito Desio, in his final report, mentioned the forced bivouac only in passing. Mehdi's frostbite was an embarrassment to the expedition. Bonatti was later accused by Compagnoni of using some of the oxygen to survive his bivouac, causing the climbers to run out of oxygen earlier than expected on the summit day. Bonatti immediately claimed that he could not use this supplemental oxygen because both the mask and the regulator were at Camp IX. Bonatti brought evidence supporting his response that Compagnoni had lied about running out of oxygen en route to the summit. Although Bonatti's version of facts was supported by Lacedelli in K2: The Price of Conquest (2004), Lacedelli contended that the oxygen had in fact run out. However, he attributed this not to Bonatti's alleged use of the oxygen, but to the physical exertion of the climb causing the use of more oxygen than expected.

For a long time, Bonatti was accused and vilified by a part of the climbing community but over time some evidence has come out to support his honesty. Reinhold Messner, in June 2010, said, "Bonatti was one of the greatest climbers of all time – the last true Alpinist, an expert in all disciplines. But more importantly, Walter was a marvelous, tolerant, loving person. He leaves a great spiritual testament: he was a clean man vilified for 50 years over what happened on K2, but in the end, everyone accepted that he was right."

In 2007, the Italian Alpine Club published a revised official account, entitled K2 – Una storia finita, that accepted Bonatti's version of events as completely accurate.

Bonatti tried to organize a solo ascent of K2 without oxygen the following year to put the record straight but could not get the backing, so he retreated to Courmayeur, where he became a mountain guide in 1954.

=== Aiguille du Dru ===
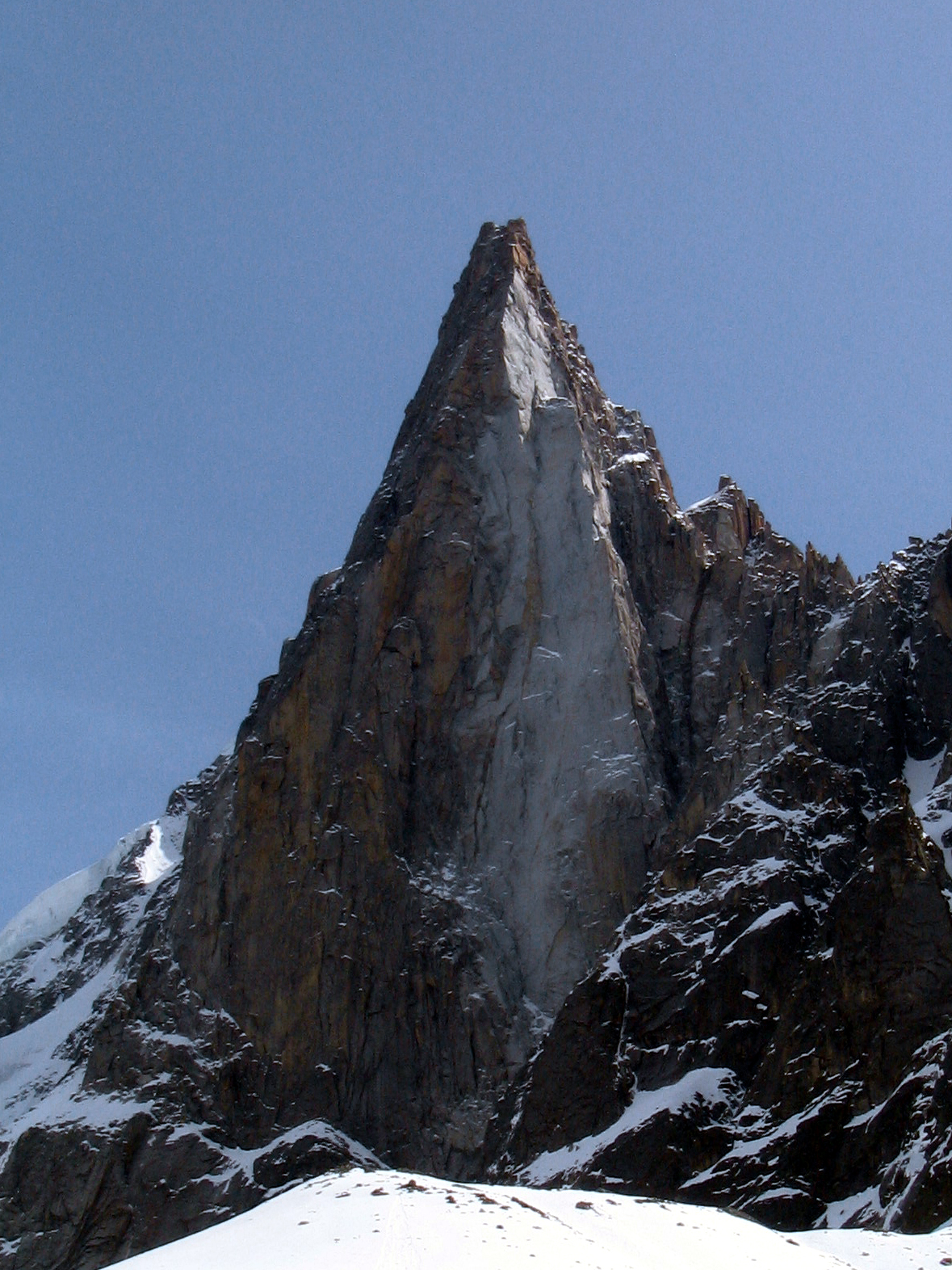
West face of Aiguille du Dru in 2006

Many years later, Bonatti would write:

Until the conquest of K2, I had always felt a great affinity and trust for other men, but after what happened in 1954 I came to mistrust people. I tended to rely only on myself. This was limiting me and I knew it, but it at least served to protect me from further disappointment.

— Walter Bonatti, The Mountains of My Life

In the August 1955, after two attempts frustrated by the weather, he managed to solo climb a new route on the south-west pillar of the Aiguille du Dru in the Mont Blanc Group. The climb, rated ED+ with difficulties up to UIAA VIII-, required six days (and five hanging bivouacs) and still today is considered a masterpiece of climbing.

After five days of climbing on a vertical rock offering very limited protection, Bonatti found himself stalled and faced with an impassable overhanging section. On the left and on the right the rock was absolutely smooth. Bonatti put together all the slings and small sections of ropes he had on him, attached one end of the rope in a crack, and swinging on the other end managed to negotiate the difficulty. This route, known afterward as the Bonatti Pillar, is considered still today as one of the greatest achievements in alpinism. In order to overcome long vertical sections and several overhangs, Bonatti had to adapt the techniques of aid climbing to the granitic rock formations of the Dru.

In 2005 a massive landslide completely destroyed the Bonatti Pillar route.

=== The "Vincendon and Henry tragedy" ===
In December 1956, together with his partner Silvano Gheser, Bonatti attempted a winter ascent of the Pear Route on the Brenva side of Monte Blanc. During the approach they met two climbers, the French Jean Vincendon and the Belgian François Henry, en route to the nearby Brenva Spur, a climb of medium difficulty. Both parties started their respective climbs at 4am on Christmas Day in clear sunny conditions. After a few hours, ice conditions on Bonatti's climb deteriorated dangerously and he and Gheser were forced to seek a safe exit up the Brenva Spur where Jean Vincendon and François Henry were climbing. The two parties continued the climb on different, but parallel, lines. Close to the end of the climb at 4pm, Bonatti's party was around 100 metres (330 ft) higher. In the meantime, with the approach of darkness, a strong storm began. The two parties were forced to make an unplanned bivouac at 4,100 metres (13,500 ft), but could not keep up a vocal and visual link.

Bonatti managed to pass the night unharmed but his companion Gheser started to suffer from frostbite to one foot. On 26 December Bonatti and Gheser descended 100 metres (330 ft) lower to join the other party. The four climbers continued the climb together and arrived on the Brenva Col. From there two options were possible: descend directly to Chamonix crossing a section of unstable and avalanche-prone snow, or climb to the summit of Mont Blanc and descend the normal route to find shelter in the Vallot Hut. Bonatti decided to take the second option, the safest but also the longest and more painful because it required the four men to gain 500 metres (1,600 ft) of elevation in a winter storm. Bonatti pushed the men to climb as fast as possible because he realized time was limited; Gheser's feet and hands were suffering from severe frostbite (later in the valley he would have some fingers amputated). They arrived at the Vallot Hut when night had already fallen.

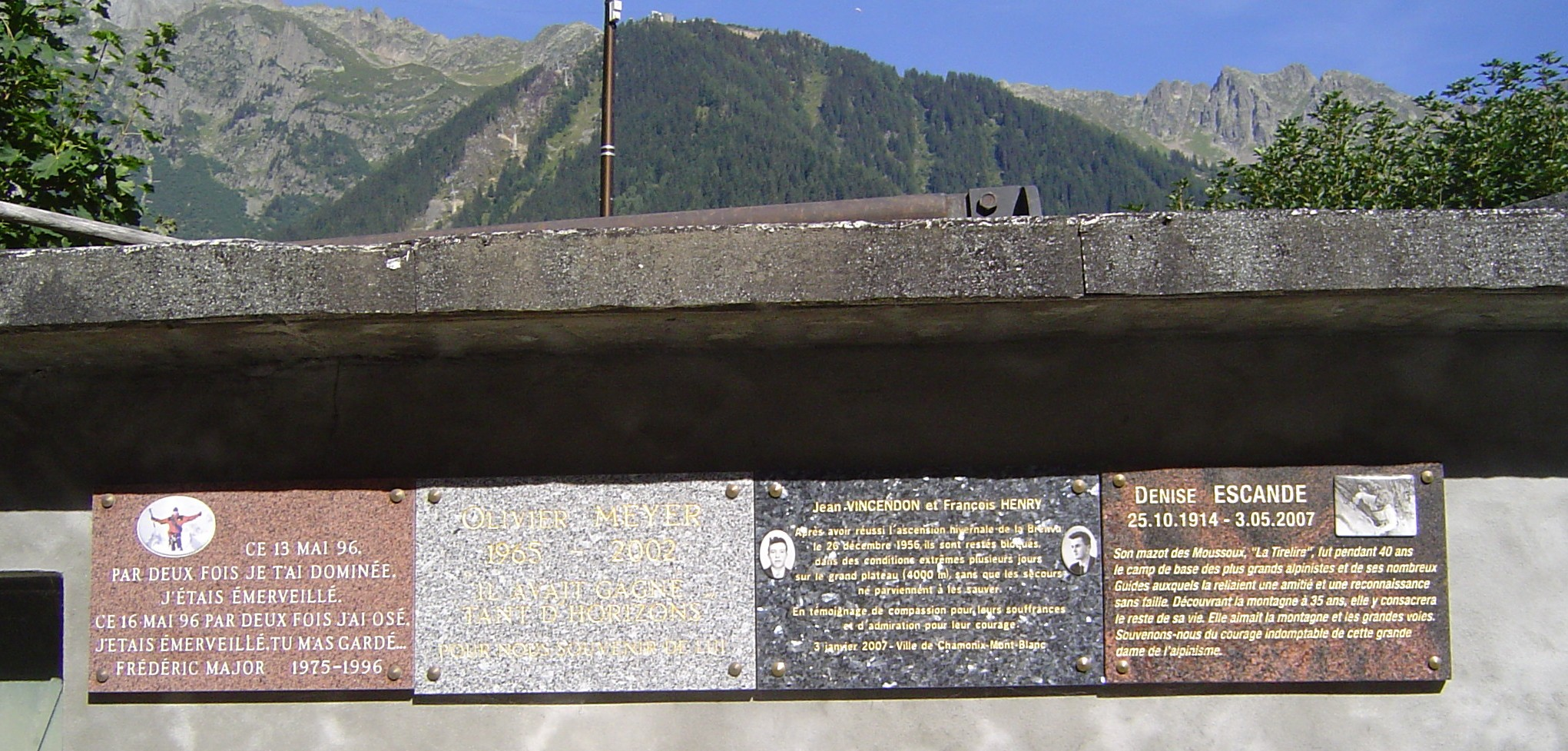
Plaque commemorating the Vincendon and Henry tragedy

In the meantime Vincendon's party decided, 200 metres (660 ft) from the summit of Mont Blanc, to turn back and head directly to Chamonix, but the arrival of darkness forced them to spend the night in a crevasse at 4,600 metres (15,100 ft). Bonatti and Gheser left the Vallot Hut on 27 December, descended the Italian side of Mont Blanc and arrived at the Gonella Hut, where on 30 December a team of alpine guides arrived to rescue them.

Vincendon and Henry, in the meantime, were totally exhausted and frostbitten and waited in the crevasse to be rescued, but the bad weather prevented a successful operation. Multiple attempts to save the climbers were made (including a helicopter sent to rescue the party but crashed on the glacier). All proved useless. Both climbers died of cold after 10 days exposure. Their bodies were recovered in March 1957. The events that marked this tragedy triggered changes in mountain rescue techniques and procedures in France.

=== Grand Pilier d'Angle ===
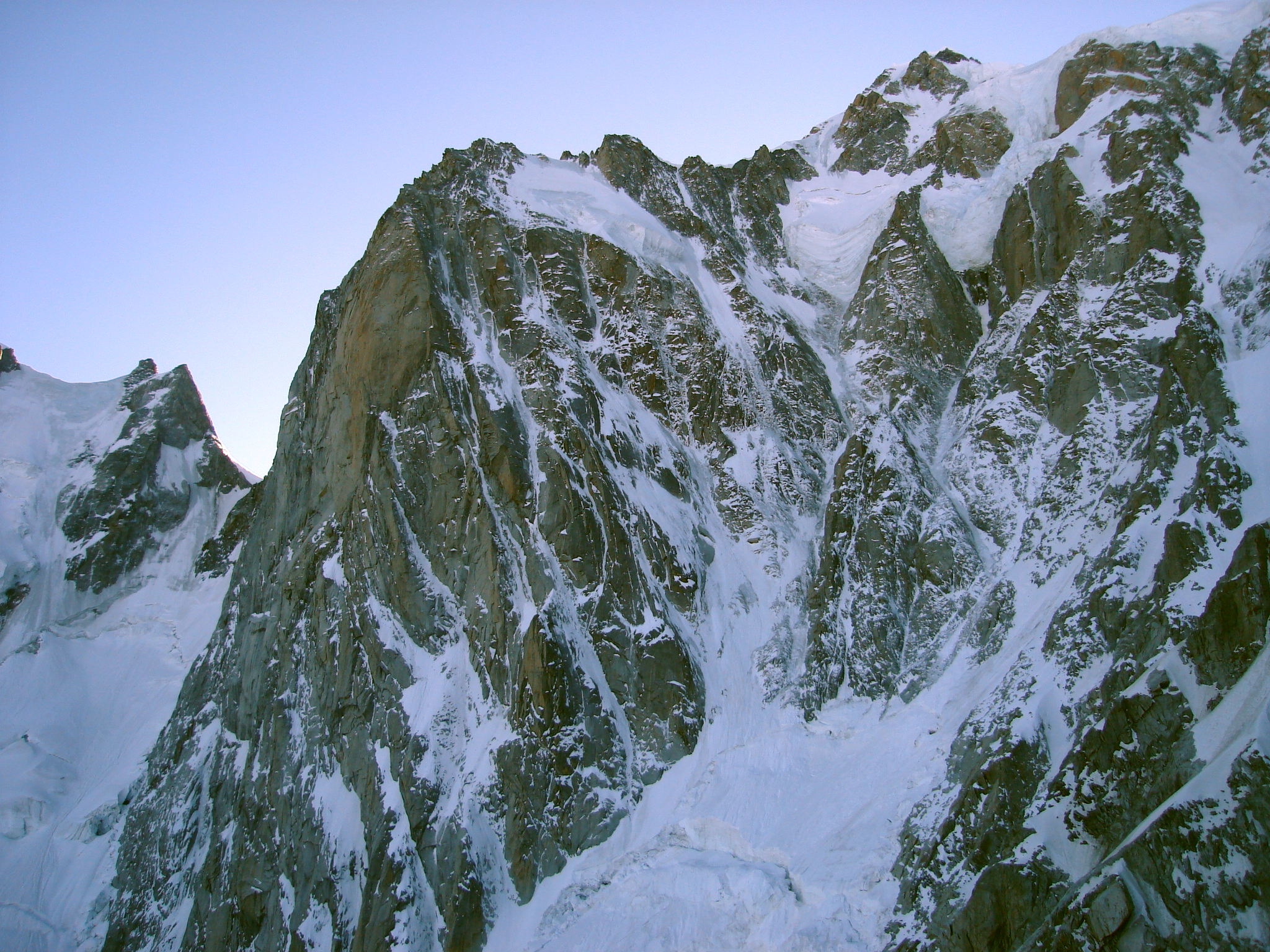
North face of the Grand Pilier d'Angle

In 1957 Bonatti relocated to Courmayeur. After a long period spent recovering from his Brenva Spur climb, Bonatti turned his attention to the last big virgin face in the Mont Blanc Group: the north face of the Grand Pilier d'Angle. Three new routes were opened on the Grand Pilier d'Angle between 1957 and 1963: on the north-east face with Toni Gobbi (1–3 August 1957), on the north face (22–23 June 1962) with Cosimo Zappelli and again with Zappelli on the south-east face (11–12 October 1963). All these routes have an alpine difficulty around ED and are UIAA-rated V/VI.

Bonatti declared after the first ascent of the north-east face of the Grand Pilier d'Angle, that "The mixed terrain of the face was, without doubt, the most somber, the most savage and the most dangerous of any that I have ever encountered in the Alps.".

On 9 March 1961, Bonatti climbed together with Gigi Panei and made the first winter ascent of the Via della Sentinella Rossa, a classic route on the Brenva side of Mont Blanc in a record time of 11 hours from the bivouac of La Fourche.

=== Patagonia ===
In January 1958 Bonatti was in Patagonia, (Argentina), to participate in a mixed Argentine-Italian expedition in the glaciated mountains of the Southern Patagonian Ice Field. The objective was to climb with Carlo Mauri the unclimbed Cerro Torre (3,128 metres (10,262 ft)). The climb started from the west side of the mountain on 2 February in conditions of fair weather, but the route would prove to be difficult and the climbing equipment (ropes and pitons) insufficient. Very likely, the climb itself was above the skills of the best climbers of the time. Indeed, the first undisputed and fair climb of Cerro Torre would be achieved only in 1974 by another Italian expedition, after many unsuccessful attempts by other climbers.

During the same expedition, along with Argentines René Eggmann and Folco Doro Altán, they ascended on 4 February the unclimbed Cerro Mariano Moreno and on 7 February the also unclimbed Cerro Adela. In the following days, they concatenated the mountains Cerro Ñato, Cerro Doblado, Cerro Grande, and Cerro Luca (this last one climbed for the first time). Cerro Luca, in the Group of Cerro Grande, was named by the two climbers after Mauri's son. The traverse of the three mountains is currently known as Travesía del Cordón Adela (Cerro Adela traverse). This impressive traverse took place only two days after the first ascent of Cerro Mariano Moreno.

=== Gasherbrum IV ===
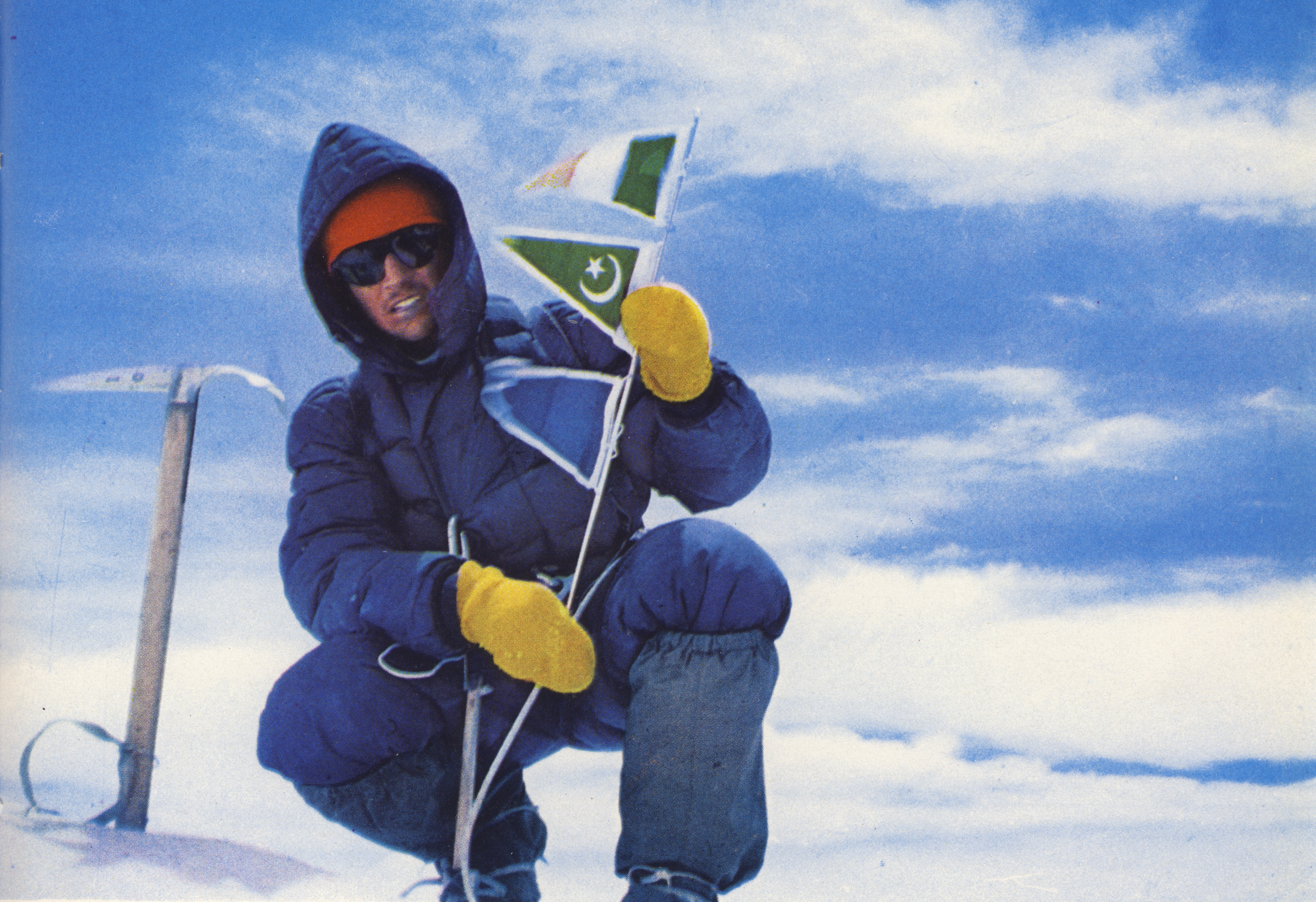
Bonatti on the summit of Gasherbrum IV

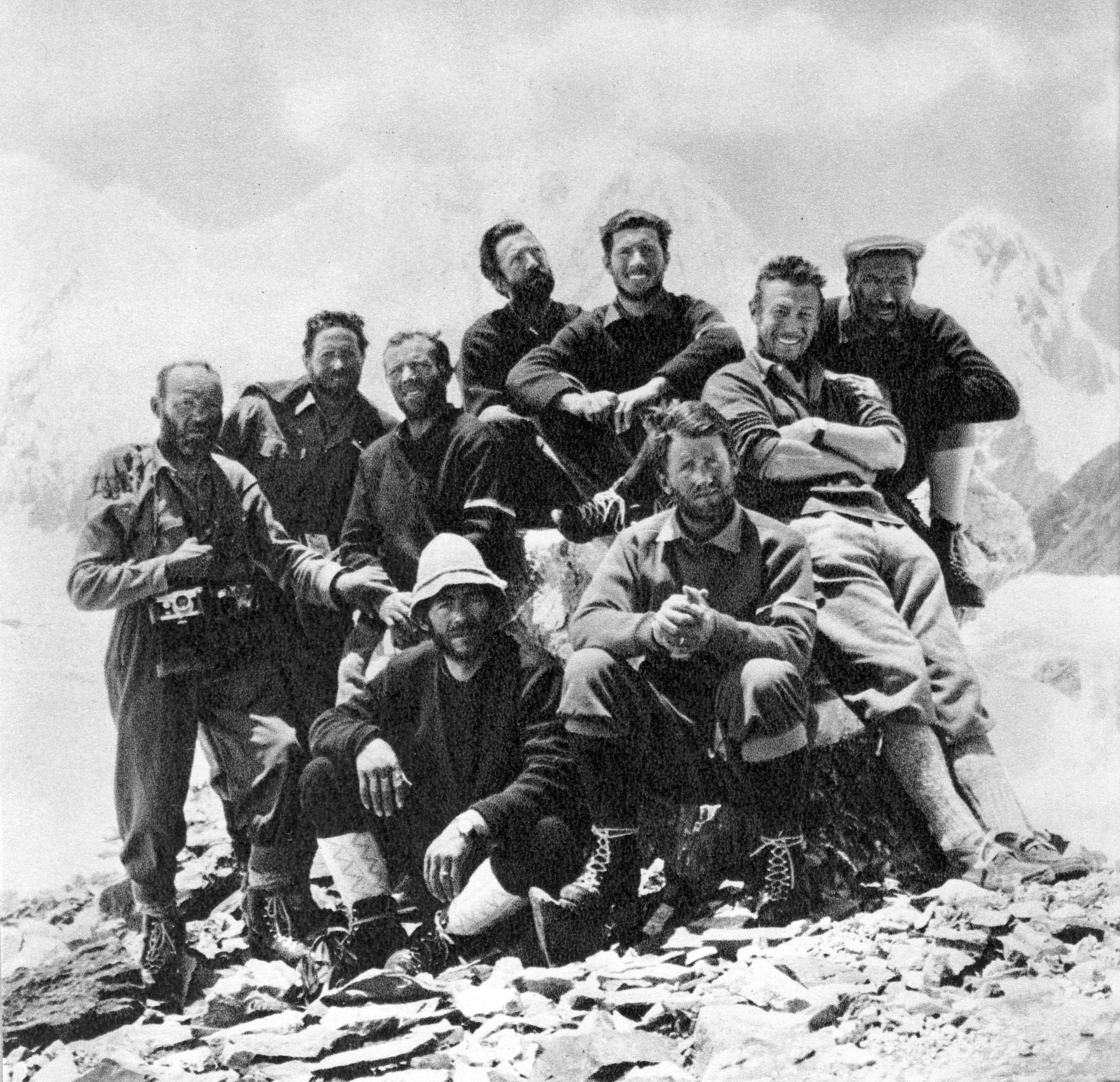
The Italian expedition to Gasherbrum IV. Bonatti is seated on the rock in the middle.

In 1958 Bonatti joined an Italian expedition led by Riccardo Cassin to the Karakoram mountains of Pakistan. The intention was to climb the previously unconquered Gasherbrum IV (7,925 metres (26,001 ft), the 17th highest mountain on Earth and the 6th highest in Pakistan). On 6 August, together with Carlo Mauri, Bonatti summited after an alpine style ascent by the north-east ridge.

=== Cordillera Huayhuash ===
In May 1961, Walter Bonatti and Andrea Oggioni climb Nevado Ninashanca (5,607 metres (18,396 ft)) and achieved the first ascent of Rondoy Norte (5,789 metres (18,993 ft)), a remote peak of the Cordillera Huayhuash. This peak was climbed by the west face, a very serious and difficult climb rated ED+. It has recorded very few ascents since.

=== The tragedy of the Central Pillar of Frêney ===
In the summer of 1961 Walter Bonatti, Andrea Oggioni, and Roberto Gallieni decided to climb the Central Pillar of Frêney, an unclimbed peak of the Mont Blanc Group. During the approach at the Bivouac of La Fourche they met a French team composed of Pierre Mazeaud, Pierre Kohlmann, Robert Guillaume and Antoine Vieille. The two teams decided to make the ambitious climb together. A snowstorm, lasting more than one week, blocked the two parties only 100 metres (330 ft) from the summit of the pillar. In the meantime, two alpine guides (Gigi Panei and Alberto Tassotti) alerted by the fact that Bonatti had not yet returned to Courmayeur, moved to the Bivouac of La Fourche and realized, reading a note left by Bonatti in the hut book, the scope of the climb of the two teams. Meanwhile, Bonatti and the others were in a stalled situation; they had not moved for the previous three days. Finally, they decided to descend, but only three climbers (Bonatti, Gallieni and Mazeaud) managed to return safely. The other four died of exhaustion or from accidents while trying to find a way out through the fresh snow. Vieille died at the Rochers Gruber (a technical section of the climb) and Guillaume fell into a crevasse of the Freney Glacier. Andrea Oggioni died in the Innominata Gully, less than one hour of descent from the hut. Pierre Kohlmann died only 10 minutes walk from the hut. In 2002, French President Jacques Chirac awarded Bonatti the National Order of the Legion of Honor for the courage, determination, and altruism he demonstrated in trying to save his fellow climbers.

The Central Pillar of Frêney remained unclimbed only for a few days. On 29 August 1961 Chris Bonington, Ian Clough, Don Whillans and Jan Długosz were the first to solve what was called the "Last Great Problem of the Alps’.

=== Grandes Jorasses ===
In four days, between the 6 and 10 August 1964, Bonatti climbed for the first time the Pointe Whymper (one of the six summits of the Grandes Jorasses) together with Michel Vaucher. The climb (known today as the Bonatti-Vaucher route) is still considered very technical and difficult. It is classified as ED alpine grade and consists of 1,100 metres (3,600 ft) of rock-climbing rated UIAA VI, several sections of mixed ground quoted M6 (vertical to overhanging with difficult dry tooling) and with some pitches of A2 aid climbing. This difficult climb would be repeated in winter in 1976 by Pierre Béghin and Xavier Fargeas. In 1977 Pierre Béghin would solo the route in winter.

=== Matterhorn ===
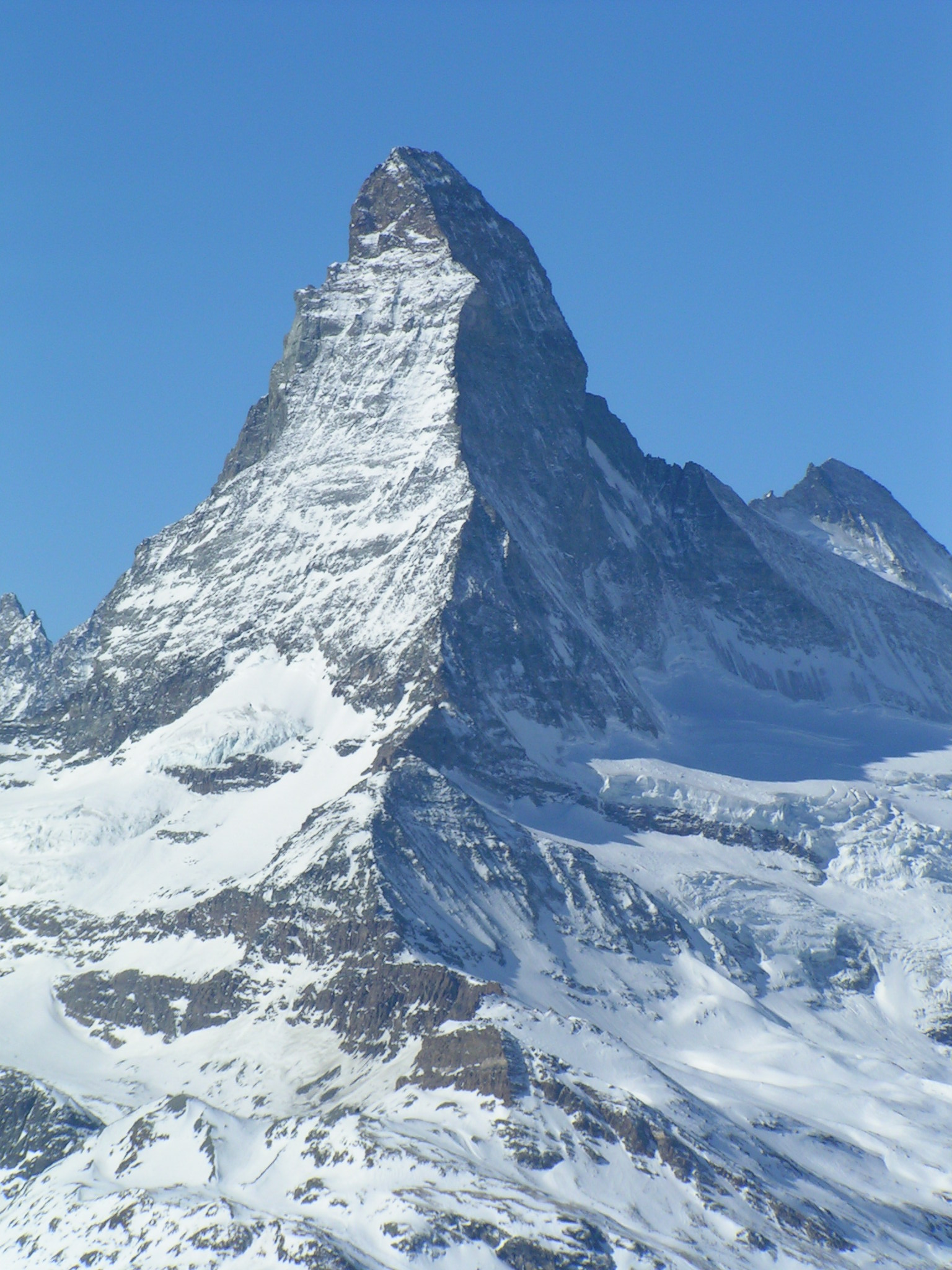
On the right side of the Matterhorn, in the shadow, is its north face

In February 1965, Bonatti tried with two companions to climb a new, direct route on Matterhorn Nordwand (north face) but the team was turned around by a storm. Back in the valley, his two friends had to leave. He considered his options and then set off on 18 February 1965 for a second attempt alone. Five days later he emerged on the summit, having completed a demanding climb of 1.200 metres rated ED+. This climb has since been rarely repeated solo and in winter, the three most notable repetitions being perhaps:

- February 1994: Catherine Destivelle in four days;
- March 2006: Ueli Steck in 25 hours;
- 27. September 2011: Patrik Aufdenblatten and Michi Lerjen-Demjen in 7 hours and 14 minutes.

Shortly after the climb, Walter Bonatti announced his retirement from professional climbing at the age of 35 and after only 17 years of climbing activity.

=== Life after professional climbing: Reporter and explorer ===
Bonatti worked for more than 20 years as a reporter for the weekly Italian magazine Epoca, traveling off the beaten track. Here are the most notable places he visited:

- 1965 : Alaska to explore the Pribilof Islands
- 1966 : Uganda and Tanzania to ascend the Kilimanjaro in Tanzania and the Ruwenzori, and track the itinerary made by Prince Luigi Amedeo, Duke of the Abruzzi in 1906. He crossed alone a wild jungle of 1200 km.
- 1967 and 1973 : South America to explore the Orinoco and the Amazon River.
- 1968 : Island of Sumatra to study the behavior of the tiger and enter in contact with the Sakai, a population of Aboriginal people coming originally from Malaysian jungles.
- 1969 : Australia to explore the Center of Australia and Lake Eyre.
- 1969 : Marquesas Islands to make in the jungle the trip made by Melville. He found the same locations described by Melville and proved that the original story was true.
- 1971 : Cape Horn.
- 1971 : Argentina to climb Aconcagua.
- 1972 : Zaire and Congo to climb Nyiragongo Volcano.
- 1974 : New Guinea to enter in contact with some local tribes.
- 1976 : Antarctica to explore the McMurdo Dry Valleys with a team of scientists.
- 1978 : South America to locate the sources of the Amazon River.
- 1985–1986 : Chile to explore the Patagonian Southern Patagonian Ice Field.

Most of these adventures are described in his book In terre lontane.

=== The union with Rossana Podestà ===
In 1980 Bonatti met the former actress Rossana Podestà in Rome and they soon relocated to Dubino, a small town in the Alps.

Bonatti, aged 81, died alone at a private clinic where the hospital management would not allow his partner of more than 30 years to spend the last minutes of his life together because the two were not married. His funeral took place in Lecco on 18 September 2011, where he was cremated and the ashes interred in the cemetery of Porto Venere.

== Climbing philosophy ==
Walter Bonatti called his climbing philosophy "The pursuit with the extremely hard". He pulled off a fantastic number of audacious ascents plus more remarkably survived some horrific climbs that killed some of his associates. The underlying idea of his approach was to accept climbing the mountain hard as it is, with fair means and in the simplest and most aesthetic way possible. In an interview left to John Crace of The Guardian on 30 June 2010, he said: Modern equipment is so technically advanced you can climb anything if you put your mind to it. The impossible has been removed from the equation.

He was always fiercely opposed to the use of expansion bolts. Reinhold Messner shared Bonatti's approach and stated in the book The Murder of the Impossible that "Expansion bolts contribute to the decline of alpinism".

In his book The Mountains of My Life Walter Bonatti writes:

For me, the value of a climb is the sum of three inseparable elements, all equally important: aesthetics, history, and ethics. Together they form the whole basis of my concept of alpinism. Some people see no more in climbing mountains than an escape from the harsh realities of modern times. This is not only uninformed but unfair. I don’t deny that there can be an element of escapism in mountaineering, but this should never overshadow its real essence, which is not escape but victory over your own human frailty.

== Honors ==

- Knight Grand Cross of the Order of Merit of the Italian Republic (Cavaliere di gran croce dell'Ordine al merito della Repubblica italiana)

Rome, 2 December 2004

Bonatti later refused the honour because it was jointly awarded to Achille Compagnoni.

- Commander of the National Order of the Legion of Honor (Commandeur de l'Ordre national de la Légion d'honneur)

Paris, June 2002

- Piolet d'Or Lifetime Achievement Award, the first-ever time the award was made.

2009

== Legacy ==
The life of Walter Bonatti has inspired entire generations of climbers, in Italy and worldwide.

A hut in the Val Ferret, at 2,025 metres (6,644 ft) near the village of La Vachey, in the municipality of Courmayeur is dedicated to Bonatti.

In 2009 Bonatti was awarded the Piolet d'Or for his lifetime achievement. After his death, the Piolet d'Or prize for lifetime achievement was renamed Piolet d'Or for lifetime achievement, Walter Bonatti prize.

British climber Doug Scott wrote in his 1974 book Big Walls that Bonatti was perhaps the finest alpinist there has ever been, while in 2010 Reinhold Messner described him as one of the greatest climbers of all time and a marvellous person.

The legendary Chris Bonington said about Bonatti: He was a complex person and a sensitive one too. K2 always preyed on his mind. But he was also a man of great integrity. And a great gentleman.

French alpinist Pierre Mazeaud declared: Il y a de la spiritualité chez cet être-là. Pour moi, Walter est sans doute un héros de légende mais c’est avant tout un homme de vérité qui a tout simplement du cœur (There is spirituality in that person. For me, Walter is undoubtedly a legendary hero but it is above all a man of truth who has a big heart).

Gaston Rebuffat would speak of Bonatti in the following terms: Un homme doté d'un idéal mais également doté des précieuses qualités humaines qui permettent de réellement mettre un idéal en pratique. (A man with ideals, but also with the precious human qualities making possible ideals to become real).

In May 2012 the first movie on the life of Bonatti: Con i muscoli, con il cuore, con la testa, was produced by Road Television. The production of the movie started before Bonatti's death and modified slightly afterwards.

== List of main mountaineering achievements ==
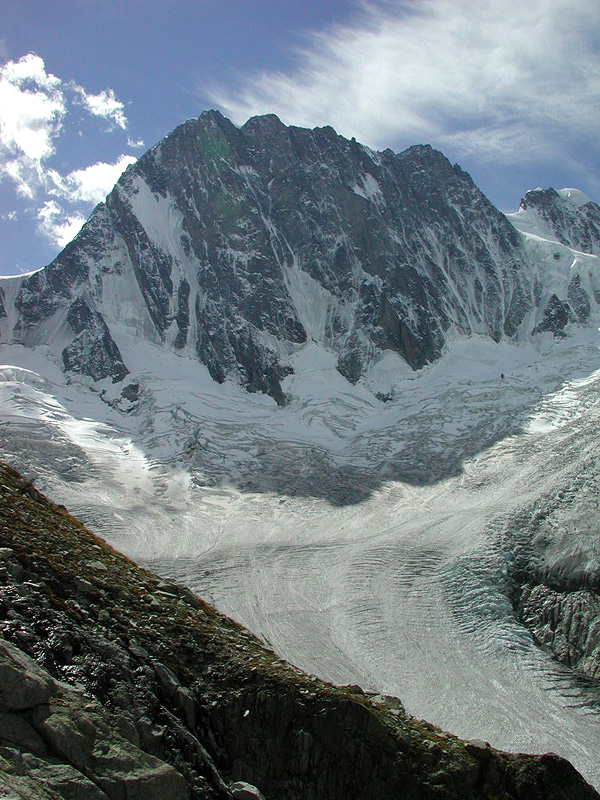
North Face of the Grandes Jorasses

Listed are some of the most significant climbs of Water Bonatti.

- Oppio-Colnaghi-Guidi Route – Croz dell'Altissimo – 27–29 June 1949 – First repetition with Andrea Oggioni and Iosve Aiazzi
- Ratti-Vitali Route – Aiguille Noire de Peuterey – 13–14 August 1949 – Third repetition with Andrea Oggioni and Emilio Villa
- Cassin Route – Grandes Jorasses (Walker spur) – 17–19 August 1949 – Fifth repetition with Andrea Oggioni
- Gaiser-Lehmann Route – Pizzo Cengalo – 30 June −2 July 1950 – First repetition with C. Casati
- Bonatti-Nava Route – Punta Sant'Anna – 6–7 August 1950 – First ascent by the north ridge
- Bonatti-Ghigo Route – Grand Capucin – 20–23 July 1951 – First ascent of the east face
- Cassin Route – Cima ovest di Lavaredo – February 1953 – First winter ascent with Carlo Mauri
- Bonatti-Gobbi Route – Grand Pilier d'Angle – 1–3 August 1957 – First ascent with Toni Gobbi of the east face
- Northeast ridge – Gasherbrum IV – 6 August 1958 – First ascent with Carlo Mauri
- Runtuy North – May 1961 – First ascent with Andrea Oggioni
- Sentinella Rossa Route – Mont Blanc – 9 March 1961 – First winter ascent with Gigi Panei
- Bonatti-Zappelli Direct Route – Mont Blanc (Frêney) – 20–22 September 1961 – First ascent with Cosimo Zappelli
- Bonatti-Zappelli Route – Grand Pilier d'Angle – 22–23 June 1962 – First ascent with Cosimo Zappelli, north face
- Cassin Route – Grandes Jorasses – 25–30 January 1963 – First winter ascent with Cosimo Zappelli
- Bonatti-Zappelli Route – Grand Pilier d'Angle – 11–12 October 1963 – First ascent with Cosimo Zappelli, south face
- North ridge – Trident du Tacul – 30 July 1964 – First ascent with Livio Stuffer
- Bonatti-Vaucher Route – Grandes Jorasses (Pointe Whymper) – 6–10 August 1964 – First ascent of the north face with Michel Vaucher

Routes soloed

- Bonatti Route – Aiguille du Dru – 17–22 August 1955 – First solo ascent of the south-east pillar
- Major Route – Mont Blanc (Brenva) – 13 September 1959 – First solo ascent. The same day Carlo Mauri soloed for the first time the parallel Poire Route.
- South-East face – Brenva Col – 28 March 1961 – First solo ascent
- Bonatti Route – Matterhorn – 18–22 February 1965 – First solo and winter climb of a new route on the north face

== Books ==
Walter Bonatti was a prolific writer. Hereafter are listed his books. Most of them were translated in several languages.

- Le Mie Montagne (My Mountains), Walter Bonatti, Bologna: Zanichelli, 1961
- I Giorni Grandi (The Great Days), Walter Bonatti, Verona: Arnoldo Mondadori Editore, 1971
- Magia del Monte Bianco (Magic of Mont Blanc), Walter Bonatti, Como: Massimo Baldini Editore, 1984
- Processo al K2 (Trial on K2), Walter Bonatti, Como: Massimo Baldini Editore, 1985
- La Mia Patagonia (My Patagonia), Walter Bonatti, Como: Massimo Baldini Editore, 1986
- Un Modo di Essere (A way of Living), Walter Bonatti, Milan: dall'Oglio Editore, 1989
- K2 Storia di un Caso (K2 – The Story of a Court Case), Walter Bonatti, Bergamo: Ferrari Editrice, 1995
- Montagne di Una Vita, Walter Bonatti, Milan: Baldini & Castoldi, 1995
- K2 Storia di un Caso (K2 – The Story of a Court Case) 2nd edition, Walter Bonatti, Milan: Baldini & Castoldi, 1996
- In terre lontane (In far away lands), Walter Bonatti, Milan: Baldini & Castoldi, 1998
- The Mountains of My Life, Walter Bonatti, Penguin Classics, 2010. ISBN 978-0-141-95716-6
- K2 La verità. 1954–2004 (K2 The truth), Walter Bonatti, 2005, Baldini Castoldi Dalai editore. ISBN 88-8490-845-0.
- K2 Lies and Treachery, Robert Marshall, 2009, Carreg Ltd. UK. ISBN 978-0-9538631-7-4.
- Un mondo perduto: viaggio a ritroso nel tempo, Walter Bonatti, Milan: Baldini Castoldi Dalai, 2009
