= Refuge Walter-Bonatti =

Coordinates: 45°50′52″N 7°02′05″E

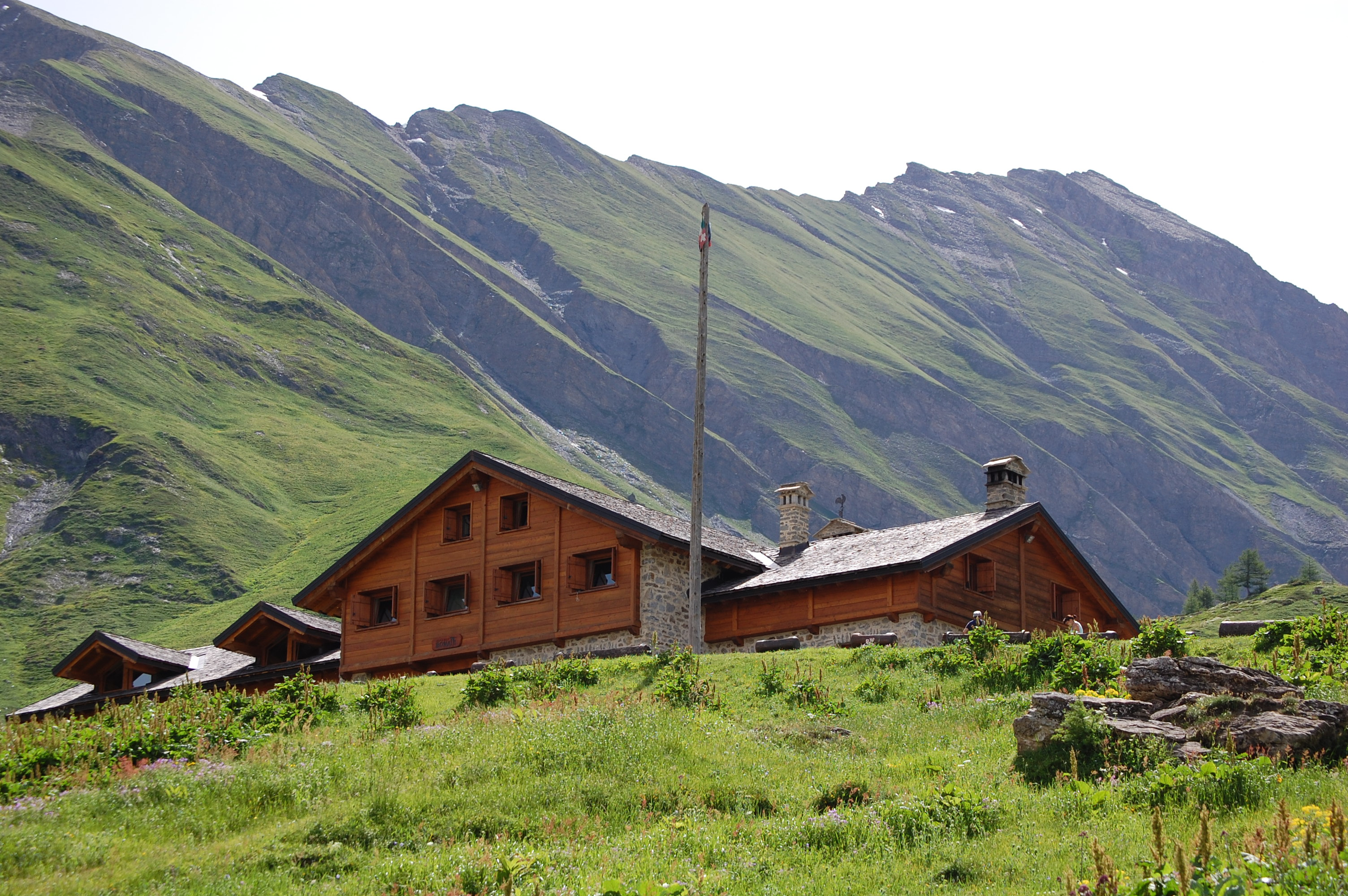
Refuge Walter Bonatti

Refuge Walter-Bonatti is a mountain hut in the Val Ferret, in the Pennine Alps, Aosta Valley, Italy, at an altitude of 2,025 metres (6,644 ft). It is named after the Italian mountaineer.
