= Croz dell'Altissimo =

Mountain in Italy

Coordinates: 46°10′09″N 10°56′28″E

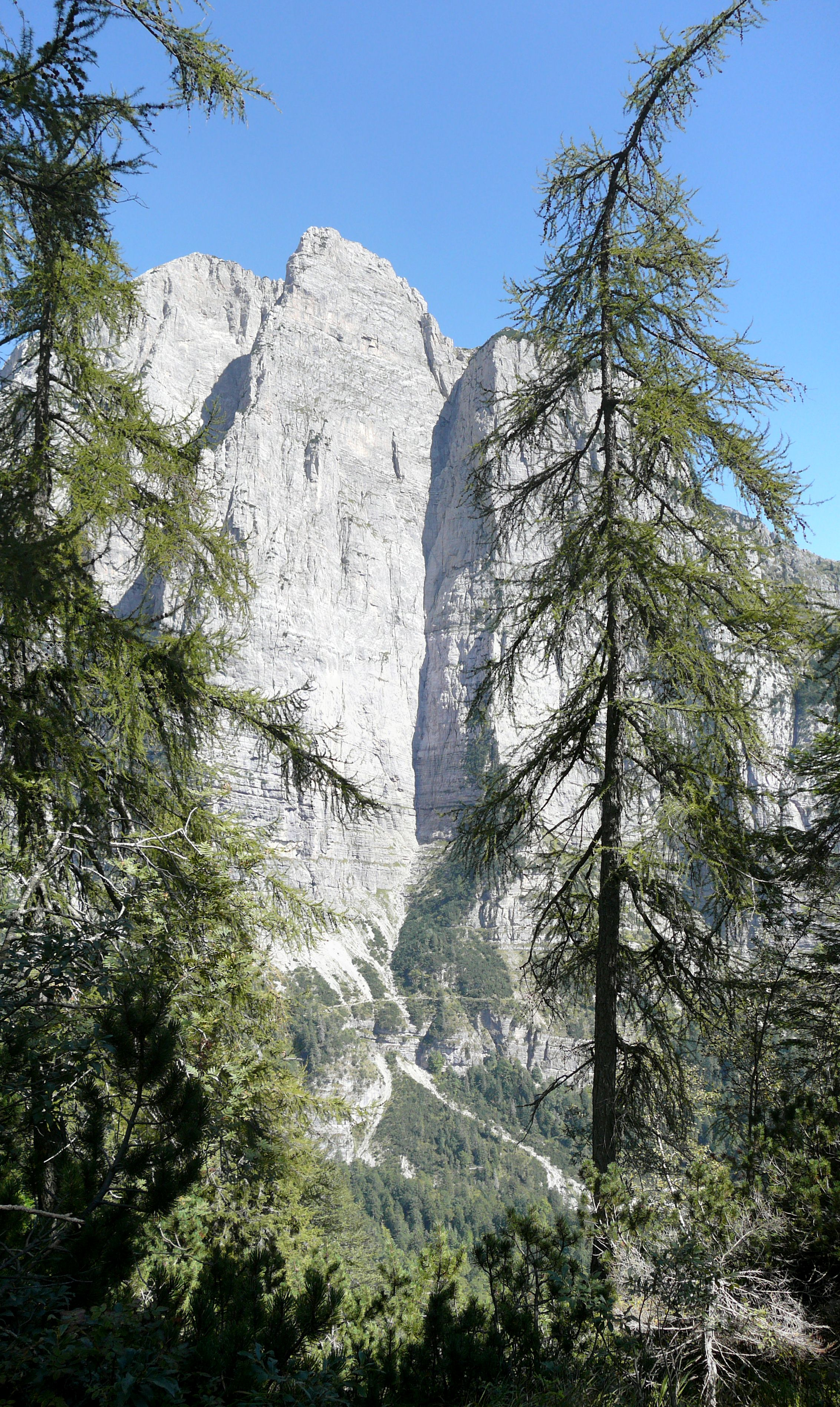
Gruppo del Brenta - Croz dell'Altissimo

Croz dell'Altissimo is a mountain in the Brenta group (It.: Dolomiti di Brenta), a subgroup of the Rhaetian Alps in the Italian Region of Trentino-Alto Adige, with a height of 2,339 metres (7,674 ft)). The mountain is mostly known for its imposing South-West face that rises with a straight vertical 900 meters from Val dell Seghe, above Molveno, up to the summit ridge. The mountain has actually two distinct summits, a NW and a SE summit, of which the former is slightly higher but the latter bears the cross. The east and north sides of the mountain are quite easily accessible for hikers.

== Climbing history ==
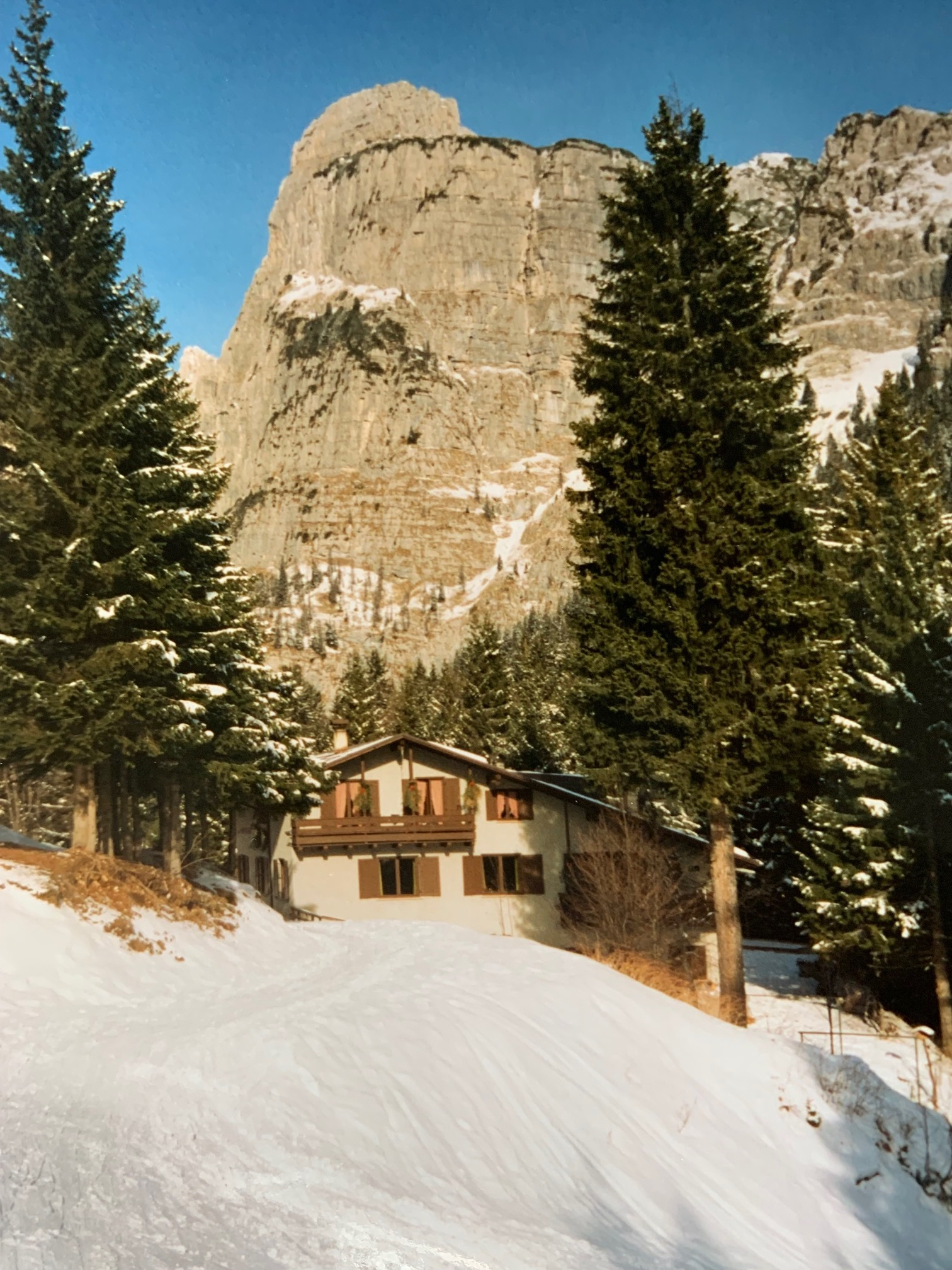
Rif. La Montanara (1995)

The first men to climb to the summit of Croz dell'Altissimo were probably the shepherds and hunters of Molveno and surrounding villages. Molveno had its pastures on the adjacent southeast slopes of the mountain at Malga Tovre, while Spormaggiore had the Malga Spor to the north. The mountain’s west wall, though, remained inaccessible for centuries. It was not climbed until August 1910 when Cortina d’Ampezzo born guide Angelo Dibona, guide Luigi Rizzi from Val di Fassa, together with Max and Guido Mayer, opened the Via Dibona, a 900 meter vertical climb up the west wall. Starting with a rather winding trajectory at the base, it then goes straight up through the inside corner between the west wall and the big south-west buttress overcoming a key passage round a massive protruding rock, “il masso squarciato” and then turning to the outer ridge of the shoulder towards the top. (UIAA: V+) At the time, this ascent was just about the limit of what was considered technically feasible. Dibona would later recall that he had used only two pitons during the whole ascent one probably in the wet passage around the “masso squarciato”. Paul Preuss, during his 1911 season in the Dolomites, became the second to climb the Via Dibona, this time accompanied by his brother in law, the lawyer Paul Relly. It was not until more than two decades later that other classic routes were climbed through the Croz west wall. The Armani-Fedrizzi Dihedral, first climbed by Matteo Armani and Cornelio Fedrizzi in 1936 through fissures and exposed chimneys to the east of the central buttress(UIAA: V and VI). The Via Detassis climbed by the acclaimed Brenta guides Bruno Detassis and Enrico Giordani in 1936 ascends through the obvious line of chimneys to the left of the large gorge that descends from the main peak, to the left of the central buttress. (UIAA: V and VI/A1). The Via Oppio: via the west wall, a great achievement in 1939 of Nino Oppio, Serafino Colnaghi and Leopoldo Guidi (UIAA:V+/A1 and VI/A2). It waited 10 years to be repeated, by Walter Bonatti c.s. in 1949 Other well known climbing routes include the Spigolo Stenico-Furlani climbed in 1942 by Marino Stenico and Carlo Furlani (UIAA:V/V+), the Via Loss-De Stefani, opened by Bepi Loss and Romeo De Stefani in 1967 (UIAA: V and VI), the Via del Rifugio Croz dell'Altissimo, traced by Dario Bonetti, Felice Spellini and Valentino Chini in 1974 (UIAA: V + and A2) and the Via Sinfonia d'Autunno, an itinerary that has become a more recent classic on the Croz. (UIAA: VI and A1)

== Today ==
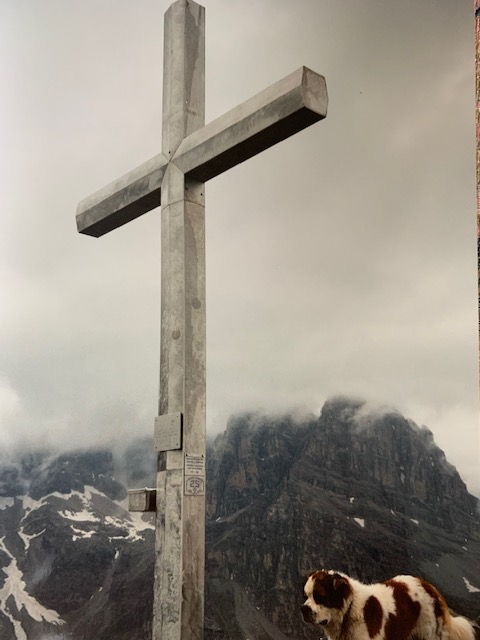
Summit cross of Croz dell'Altissimo (1994)

The area is supported by two privately managed mountain cabins, Rifugio La Montanara, accessible by cable lift from Molveno, and Rifugio Croz’ dell Altissimo that can be reached from Molveno through Pradel or Val delle Seghe.
