= National Register of Historic Places listings in Sheridan County, Wyoming =

Location of Sheridan County in Wyoming

This is a list of the National Register of Historic Places listings in Sheridan County, Wyoming. It is intended to be a complete list of the properties and districts on the National Register of Historic Places in Sheridan County, Wyoming, United States. The locations of National Register properties and districts for which the latitude and longitude coordinates are included below, may be seen in a map.

There are 31 properties and districts listed on the National Register in the county, one of which is a National Historic Landmark.

This National Park Service list is complete through NPS recent listings posted April 3, 2026.

Contents: Counties in Wyoming
Albany - Big Horn - Campbell - Carbon - Converse - Crook - Fremont - Goshen - Hot Springs - Johnson - Laramie - Lincoln - Natrona - Niobrara - Park - Platte - Sheridan - Sublette - Sweetwater - Teton - Uinta - Washakie - Weston

== Current listings ==
	Name on the Register	Image	Date listed	Location	City or town	Description
1	Big Goose Creek Buffalo Jump	Big Goose Creek Buffalo Jump	February 12, 1974 (#74002031)	Address restricted	Sheridan vicinity	Buffalo jump with three occupation levels dating to the late 15th or early 16th century, and some metal artifacts indicating use around the start of the contact era.
2	Big Red Ranch Complex		October 11, 1984 (#84000437)	30 Big Red Ln. 44°33′56″N 106°31′40″W	Ucross	Circa-1882 ranch house, outhouse, and barn of one of the few large agricultural corporations to weather the open range era, diversifying into sheep ranching, irrigated farming, and sugar beets. Now the Ucross Foundation artist retreat.
3	CKW Bridge over Powder River	CKW Bridge over Powder River	February 22, 1985 (#85000432)	U.S. Routes 14/16; 44°41′50″N 106°06′46″W	Arvada	452-foot (138 m) Pratt deck truss bridge built 1932–33; Wyoming's leading example of the deck truss bridges developed for long highway crossings from the 1930s to the 1950s. Replaced in 1990.
4	Clearmont Jail	Clearmont Jail	May 14, 1984 (#84003698)	Water St. 44°38′21″N 106°22′48″W	Clearmont	1922 jail built within three years of Clearmont's incorporation, reflecting the town's early need for law and order on the migrant farm worker circuit.
5	Connor Battlefield	Connor Battlefield	August 12, 1971 (#71000891)	Connor Battlefield State Historic Park; 44°54′19″N 107°09′46″W	Ranchester	Site of the Battle of Tongue River, a U.S. attack on an Arapaho village on August 29, 1865, that served as the most significant military engagement of the Powder River Expedition.
6	Dayton Community Hall	Dayton Community Hall	November 25, 2005 (#05001338)	410 Bridge St. 44°52′34″N 107°15′53″W	Dayton	Long-serving event hall providing a venue for a wide variety of activities since it was built by the Works Progress Administration in 1936.
7	Dayton Mercantile	Dayton Mercantile	May 12, 2016 (#16000264)	408 Main St. 44°52′32″N 107°15′47″W	Dayton	Prosperous 1882 general store and post office, expanded in 1901 to include a ballroom. A long-serving center for the area's commercial, communication, and social needs.
8	EAU Arvada Bridge	EAU Arvada Bridge	February 22, 1985 (#85000433)	County Road CN3-38; 44°39′02″N 106°07′51″W	Arvada	1917 Parker through truss bridge, one of the last two remaining in Wyoming at the time of its nomination. Replaced in 1990.
9	EBF Bridge over Powder River	EBF Bridge over Powder River	February 22, 1985 (#85000434)	Lower Powder River Rd. 44°52′49″N 106°03′43″W	Leiter	One of Wyoming's first rigid-connected road truss bridges, built 1914–15 with an atypical configuration of one Pratt and one Warren through span. Replaced in 1989.
10	ECR Kooi Bridge	ECR Kooi Bridge	February 22, 1985 (#85000436)	Kooi Rd. over the Tongue River; 44°54′33″N 107°05′15″W	Monarch	80-foot (24 m) pin-connected Pratt pony truss built in 1913; an early example of a road bridge design that became common in Wyoming, and, at the time of its nomination, the longest still in use. Replaced in 2013.
11	ECS Bridge over Big Goose Creek	ECS Bridge over Big Goose Creek	February 22, 1985 (#85000435)	481 Big Goose Rd. 44°46′25″N 107°02′33″W	Sheridan	1914 pin-connected Pratt pony truss, an early example of a road bridge design that became common in Wyoming.
12	First Congregational Church	First Congregational Church	January 3, 2023 (#100008515)	101 W. Works St. 44°47′46″N 106°57′27″W	Sheridan	Exemplary early-20th-century Gothic Revival church built in 1912, whose design reflects the growing informality and expanded social functions of the era's Protestant churches.
13	Fort Mackenzie		June 18, 1981 (#81000612)	1898 Fort Rd. 44°49′47″N 106°59′15″W	Sheridan	Unusually late U.S. Army post established in 1898 and converted to a veterans hospital in 1922, with 48 contributing properties comprising one of Wyoming's largest collections of homogeneous federal buildings.
14	Stephen George Homestead		April 15, 2023 (#100008514)	86 Peno Rd. 44°46′30″N 106°53′51″W	Sheridan	Unusually well preserved example of a Wyoming homestead established under the Homestead Act of 1862, with an 1881 log cabin, an English barn, an early-20th-century Victorian house, and an outbuilding.
15	Holy Name Catholic School	Holy Name Catholic School	April 23, 2013 (#13000212)	121 S. Connor St. 44°47′45″N 106°57′05″W	Sheridan	Wyoming's oldest standing Catholic school, built in 1914, whose homey Neoclassical/American Craftsman design together with a 1952 International Style annex also illustrate two key periods in the state's school architecture.
16	Johnson Street Historic District	Johnson Street Historic District	April 9, 1984 (#84003701)	Johnson, 1st, and 2nd Sts. 44°40′50″N 106°59′30″W	Big Horn	One of Wyoming's densest surviving concentrations of western false front architecture, with five contributing properties built 1882–1929, representing 19th-century boomtowns and Big Horn's successful pivot into an agricultural service center.
17	Mount View	Mount View	December 8, 1997 (#97001534)	610 S. Jefferson St. 44°47′29″N 106°57′43″W	Sheridan	House, carriage house, and shed built 1911–12 for pioneer entrepreneur Lyman Brooks (1856–1931), an influential business and civic leader in early Sheridan. Also noted for its Prairie School design by Glenn Charles McAlister.
18	Odd Fellows Hall	Odd Fellows Hall	December 9, 1980 (#80004052)	321 Jackson St. 44°40′49″N 106°59′29″W	Big Horn	1894 Independent Order of Odd Fellows clubhouse, significant as one of the few original examples of western false front architecture remaining in Big Horn. Also a contributing property to the Johnson Street Historic District.
19	Quarter Circle A Ranch		August 10, 1976 (#76001961)	239 Brinton Rd. 44°38′42″N 107°00′33″W	Big Horn	Gentleman's ranch and vacation home complex established in 1893 and expanded by its second owner—art collector Bradford Brinton—beginning in 1923. Became the Brinton Museum in 1961.
20	Robinson-Smith House	Robinson-Smith House	April 26, 2016 (#16000207)	520 S. Brooks St. 44°47′33″N 106°57′27″W	Sheridan	A large and well-preserved example of an American Foursquare house, designed by prominent regional architect Glenn Charles McAlister and built in 1909.
21	St. Peter's Episcopal Church	St. Peter's Episcopal Church	May 8, 2013 (#13000266)	1 S. Tschirgi St. 44°47′50″N 106°57′29″W	Sheridan	1912 church noted as one of Sheridan's leading examples of Gothic Revival architecture and as one of only three Wyoming churches with stained glass from the Charles J. Connick Associates Studio, which was installed 1958–1972 as funds allowed.
22	Schunk Lodge		January 4, 2018 (#100001955)	Approx. 1 mi. N of Red Grade Rd. 44°36′48″N 107°12′45″W	Big Horn vicinity	1910 cabin used as a dude ranch and stage station, representing permitted commercial use of national forest land; expanded with six additional rustic log cabins 1933–1940s as a vacation property whose owners hosted influential guests to promote wilderness conservation in the Bighorn Mountains.
23	Sheridan County Courthouse	Sheridan County Courthouse	November 15, 1982 (#82001836)	224 S. Main St. 44°47′42″N 106°57′23″W	Sheridan	One of Wyoming's most architecturally prominent county courthouses (built 1904–05, with a 1913 jail), reflecting the determination of area settlers to found a lasting community.
24	Sheridan County Fairgrounds Historic District	Sheridan County Fairgrounds Historic District	August 10, 2011 (#11000533)	1753 Victoria St. 44°48′11″N 106°58′52″W	Sheridan	Fairgrounds complex reflecting the importance of agricultural shows and rodeos in Sheridan County, with six contributing properties built 1923–1950, including three 1939 buildings also noted for their sandstone architecture by the Works Progress Administration.
25	Sheridan Flouring Mills, Inc.	Sheridan Flouring Mills, Inc.	December 8, 1997 (#97001533)	2161 Coffeen Ave. 44°46′27″N 106°56′30″W	Sheridan	Milling complex built 1920–21 for a flour company in business 1890s–1972; a major local employer that underpinned the region's agricultural sector. Adapted to become the Mill Inn in 1978.
26	Sheridan Inn	Sheridan Inn	October 15, 1966 (#66000762)	856 Broadway St. 44°48′23″N 106°57′14″W	Sheridan	Luxurious hotel established in 1893 by the Chicago, Burlington and Quincy Railroad and operated for a few years by Buffalo Bill Cody (1846–1917), when it heavily catered to prominent easterners attracted to the area for big game hunting. Also a contributing property to the Sheridan Railroad Historic District.
27	Sheridan Main Street Historic District	Sheridan Main Street Historic District	November 9, 1982 (#82001837)	Main St. from Burkitt to Mandel Sts. 44°47′54″N 106°57′21″W	Sheridan	Well-preserved six-block central business district reflecting Sheridan's explosive early-20th-century growth as a hub for agriculture, mining, and county government; with 65 contributing properties mostly built in the 1910s and 1920s.
28	Sheridan Railroad Historic District	Sheridan Railroad Historic District	November 12, 2004 (#04001234)	201–841 Broadway St., 508–955 N. Gould St. 44°48′17″N 106°57′16″W	Sheridan	Secondary commercial and residential district created by the 1892 placement of the railroad outside Sheridan's existing downtown, with 112 contributing properties including the depot complex, trackside warehouses, working-class housing, and neighborhood businesses.
29	The Stone House	The Stone House	November 4, 2022 (#100008015)	142 SR Buffalo Creek Rd. 44°47′29″N 106°41′26″W	Wyarno	1898 ranch house with a succession of early owners and a 1922 outbuilding dating to steadier fortunes and occupancy; noted for their unusually high historical integrity and association with the volatility of homesteading in northern Wyoming.
30	Trail End	Trail End	February 26, 1970 (#70000675)	400 Clarendon Ave. 44°48′05″N 106°57′58″W	Sheridan	Mansion built 1908–1913 for cattleman turned politician John B. Kendrick (1857–1933), who served as Governor of Wyoming and U.S. Senator. Also an exemplar of the fine urban homes built by successful cattlemen around the turn of the 20th century. Became a state historic site in 1982.
31	Susan Wissler House	Susan Wissler House	March 8, 1984 (#84003703)	406 Main St. 44°52′33″N 107°15′47″W	Dayton	1885 commercial building with living quarters, inhabited 1905–1915 by three-term mayor Susan Wissler (1853–1939), the first female mayor in Wyoming.

== See also ==
- List of National Historic Landmarks in Wyoming
- National Register of Historic Places listings in Wyoming
