= Mount View =

Mount View may refer to:

- Mount View, New South Wales, town in Australia
- Mount View, Taupō, neighbourhood of Taupō, on the North Island of New Zealand
- Mount View (Sheridan, Wyoming), United States, listed on the National Register of Historic Places

== See also ==
- Mount View High School (disambiguation)
