= Gary T. Erbe =

Self taught American painter best known for trompe l'oeil technique

- Born: 1944 (age 81–82); Union City, New Jersey, U.S.
- Occupation: Painter

Gary T. Erbe (born 1944) is an American oil painter. He is self-taught, and he is best known for his trompe-l'œils. His work has been exhibited at the Canton Museum of Art, the Brinton Museum, the Boca Raton Museum of Art, the Heckscher Museum of Art, the Baum School of Art and the Reading Public Museum.

== Background ==
Erbe's interest in art began at a young age when he became fascinated by the illustrations in his school textbooks. Erbe's stepfather, Frank Schaefer, encouraged and supported Erbe's interest in art and bought him his first art set. When Erbe was fifteen, his stepfather died and, in the following decade, Erbe produced very little art.

At age sixteen, Erbe dropped out of school, and moved into a studio apartment in Weehawken, New Jersey. Shortly after, Erbe met Edny, whom he married in 1963. One year later, she and Erbe had their first child, Kim, and five years later had their second child, contemporary artist Chantell Van Erbé. To support his family, Erbe worked as an apprentice at an engraving company and painted in his spare time.

Erbe was particularly inspired by artists like William Michael Harnett and John F. Peto, who applied the trompe-l'œil approach to their paintings. Trompe-l'œil translates to "fool the eye", alluding to the way in which three-dimensional objects are rendered on a two dimensional surface. His work from the 60s involves assemblages of objects which have a thematic relationship with each other. Both the paintings and the assemblages which he paints are Erbe's masterpieces, and the assemblages have been included in his shows.

In 1969, Erbe explored a more contemporary method to trompe-l'œil called Levitational Realism, in which the objects in his paintings appear to be floating. In the following year, he quit his job as an engraver in hopes of becoming a full-time artist.

In 1978, Erbe and Edny split and Erbe moved into his own studio in Union City. Through a mutual friend he met Anna Vedovelli, a local artist who lived nearby. The two married in 1979 but divorced three years later.

By 1996, Erbe was married to Zeny Santos. They lived in his studio in Union City until 2006, moved to a condominium in Hoboken, New Jersey for three years, and now reside in Nutley, New Jersey.

Since 1970, Erbe's work has been exhibited extensively in group and solo exhibitions. His work is in the permanent collections of various well-regarded institutions.

In 2016, The Butler Institute of American Art published a 300-page book on Erbe entitled Footprints: The Art and Life of Gary Erbe.

== Selected collections ==
- Butler Institute of American Art
- Brandywine River Museum
- Canton Museum of Art
- Springfield Art Museum
- Phoenix Art Museum
- Brinton Museum
- Montclair Art Museum
- New Jersey State Museum
- Woodmere Art Museum
- New Britain Museum of American Art
- The National Arts Club, NY
- Salmagundi Club, NY
- Boca Raton Museum of Art
- John F. Peto Studio Museum
- Heckscher Museum of Art
- Fort Wayne Museum of Art

== Selected solo exhibitions ==
- 1970, Pace Gallery, Houston, TX
- 1971, Veldman Gallery, Wisconsin
- 1976, The New Britain Museum of American Art, CT
- 1976, NJ Center for Visual Arts, NJ
- 1979, General Electric World Headquarters, CT
- 1982, The Alexander Gallery, New York
- 1983, New Jersey State Museum, NJ
- 1985, The Butler Institute of American Art, OH
- 1985, Sordoni Art Gallery, PA
- 1985, The Alexander Gallery, New York
- 1988, The Montclair Art Museum, NJ
- 1988, The Canton Museum of Art, OH
- 1988, The Westmoreland Museum of American Art, PA
- 1988, The Woodmere Art Museum, PA
- 1995, The Butler Institute of American Art, OH
- 1995, The New Britain Museum of American Art, CT
- 1995, The James A. Michener Art Museum, PA
- 1995, Boca Raton Museum of Art, FL
- 1998, ACA Gallery, New York
- 1999, Springfield Art Museum, OH
- 2000, The National Arts Club Grand Gallery, New York
- 2003, Harmon Meek Gallery, Fl
- 2008–09, Albuquerque Museum, NM
- 2009, The Butler Institute of American Art, OH, 40 year Retrospective
- 2009, Salmagundi Club, New York
- 2009, Boca Raton Museum of Art, FL, 40 Year Retrospective
- 2013, The Butler Institute of American Art, OH
- 2015, Canton Museum of Art, OH
- 2015, The Baum School of Art, PA
- 2016, Heckscher Museum of Art, New York
- 2016, Jonathan Boos Gallery, New York
- 2017, The Butler Institute of American Art, OH, 50 Year Retrospective
- 2017, Brinton Museum, WY, 50 Year Retrospective
- 2018, Reading Public Museum, PA, 50 Year Retrospective
- 2019, John F. Peto Studio Museum, NJ, 50 Year Retrospective

== Awards ==
- 1975, Julius Hallgarten Award, The National Academy of Design, New York, New York
- 1975, Gold Medal of Honor, Allied Artists of American Art, 62nd Annual Exhibition, New York, New York
- 1975, First Prize, Salmagundi Club, New York, New York
- 1982, John-Young Hunter Memorial Award, Allied Artists of America, 69th Annual Exhibition, New York, New York
- 1984, Gold Medal of Honor, Allied Artists of America 71st Annual Exhibition, New York, New York
- 1985, John Young Hunter Memorial Award, Allied Artists of America, 76th Annual Exhibition, New York, New York
- 1989, Emily Lowe Award, Allied Artists of America 76th Annual Exhibition, New York, New York
- 1991, Emily Lowe Award, Audubon Artists, 49th Annual Exhibition, New York, New York
- 1991, Gold Medal of Honor, Allied Artists of America 78th Annual Exhibition, New York, New York
- 1992, Beatrice Jackson Humphreys Award, Audubon Artists 50th Annual Exhibition, New York, New York
- 1993, Gilmore- Romans Memorial Award, Allied Artists of America 80th Annual Exhibition, New York
- 1994, The Stefan Hirsch Memorial Award, Audubon Artists 52nd Annual Exhibition, New York, New York
- 1997, First Prize, The National Arts Club 99th Annual Exhibition, New York, New York
- 1998, President's Award, Salmagundi Club, New York, New York
- 1998, The Salzman Award, The National Arts Club 100th Annual Exhibition, New York, New York
- 1998, Gold Medal of Honor, Audubon Artists 56th Annual Exhibition, New York, New York
- 2000, The Alfred Crimi Award, Audubon Artists 58th Annual Exhibition, New York, New York
- 2002, First Prize, The Butler Institute of American Art 66th National Midyear Exhibition, Ohio
- 2002, Silver Medal of Honor, Audubon Artists, 60th Annual Exhibition, New York, New York
- 2003, Medal for Lifetime Achievement in American Art, The Butler Institute of American Art, Ohio
- 2004, Visual Art Award, The National Arts Club 106th Annual Exhibition, New York, New York
- 2006, Gold Medal of Honor, Allied Artists of America 93rd Annual Exhibition, New York, New York
- 2007, Salmagundi Club Medal of Honor, New York, New York
- 2007, Gold Medal of Honor, Allied Artists of America 93rd Annual Exhibition, New York, New York
- 2010, Gold Medal of Honor, National Art Museum of Sport, Indiana
- 2010, Gold Medal of Honor, Allied Artists of America 97th Annual Exhibition, New York, New York
- 2013, Received by the State of New Jersey Senate Resolution by Senator Brian P. Stack
- 2013, Received by the City of Union City, County of Hudson, State of New Jersey Proclamation by Mayor Brian P. Stack and the Board of Commissioners
- 2013, “Annie Oakley: Little Sure Shot,” The Nutley Historical Museum, Nutley, New Jersey
- 2013, First prize, National Juried Trompe l’oeil Exhibition, John F. Peto Studio Museum, Island Heights, New Jersey
