= Bridge over Powder River =

Bridge over Powder River may refer to the following bridges:

- CKW Bridge over Powder River, near Arvada, Wyoming
- EBF Bridge over Powder River, near Leiter, Wyoming
