= Big Red Ranch Complex =

Historic ranch in the U.S. state of Wyoming

- U.S. National Register of Historic Places
- Location within Wyoming Location within the United States
- Location: Off U.S. 14/16, Ucross, Wyoming
- Coordinates: 44°33′52″N 106°31′37″W
- Area: 9 acres (3.6 ha)
- Built: c. 1882
- Architectural style: Late Victorian
- NRHP reference No.: 84000437
- Added to NRHP: October 11, 1984

The Big Red Ranch Complex is an historic ranch located off U.S. Routes 14 and 16 in Ucross, Wyoming. The ranch was built circa 1882 by the Pratt & Ferris Cattle Company and was one of three large ranches operated by the company in the region. The ranch acquired its name because all of its main buildings were painted red; at the time, most ranches lacked permanent buildings entirely, much less painted ones. Pratt & Ferris became one of the most successful cattle ranching companies in the area by the end of the decade, as they bought out most other local ranches and even established a post office at the Big Red Ranch. In the 1890s, the ranch largely converted to raising sheep. In 1906, company owner Joseph Leiter turned the ranch into an irrigated farm; in the following years, the ranch briefly reverted to cattle ranching before Leiter leased it to sugar beet farmers. Leiter ultimately sold the ranch in 1949.

The ranch was added to the National Register of Historic Places on October 11, 1984.

It is now used by the Ucross Foundation.

== See also ==
- National Register of Historic Places listings in Sheridan County, Wyoming
