= Schunk Lodge =

- U.S. National Register of Historic Places
- Location within Wyoming Location within the United States
- Nearest city: Big Horn, Wyoming
- Coordinates: 44°36′47.5″N 107°12′44.7″W
- NRHP reference No.: 100001955
- Added to NRHP: January 4, 2018

Schunk Lodge is a log cabin located in a remote section of the Bighorn Mountains. The cabin was used as a mail stage stop and as a dude ranch before it became a mountain cabin for Will Schunk, a conservationist who was instrumental in the establishment of the nearby Cloud Peak Wilderness.

Schunk Lodge was listed on the National Register of Historic Places in on January 4, 2018.

== Usage ==
Schunk Lodge was previously used by The Wilderness Society as a congregative place in nationwide meetings, and was used for the 1957 election of attorney Harvey Broome as their president.
