= Tongue River Cave =

Cave in Wyoming, USA

Coordinates: 44°50′39″N 107°19′53″W

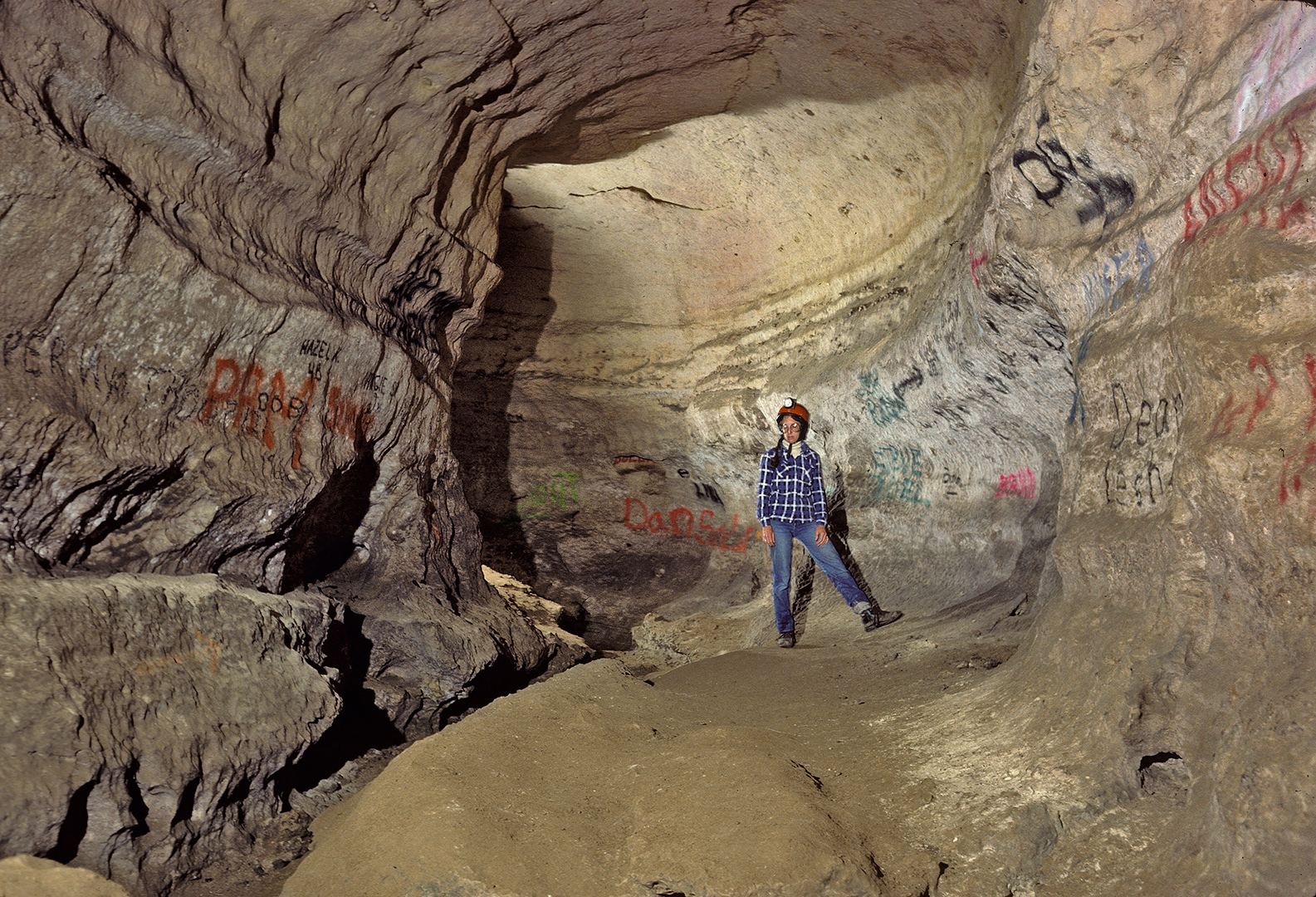
Tongue River Cave has been impacted by visitors with spray paint and destruction of speleothems.

Tongue River Cave is a cave in the Bighorn National Forest just west of Dayton, Wyoming, United States. Historically notable for a wide variety of rare cave formations and animal species, the cave has suffered in recent decades from unrestricted traffic, vandalism, and the theft of many of the cave's speleothems. Deemed beyond preservation, the cave is now managed by the U.S. Forest Service as a "sacrifice cave".

The Bighorn National Forest closed the cave to the public in July 2010 to prevent the spread of white-nose syndrome; however, the cave has since been reopened. Registration and decontamination of clothing and gear is now required to visit the cave per Forest Order.

== Geology ==
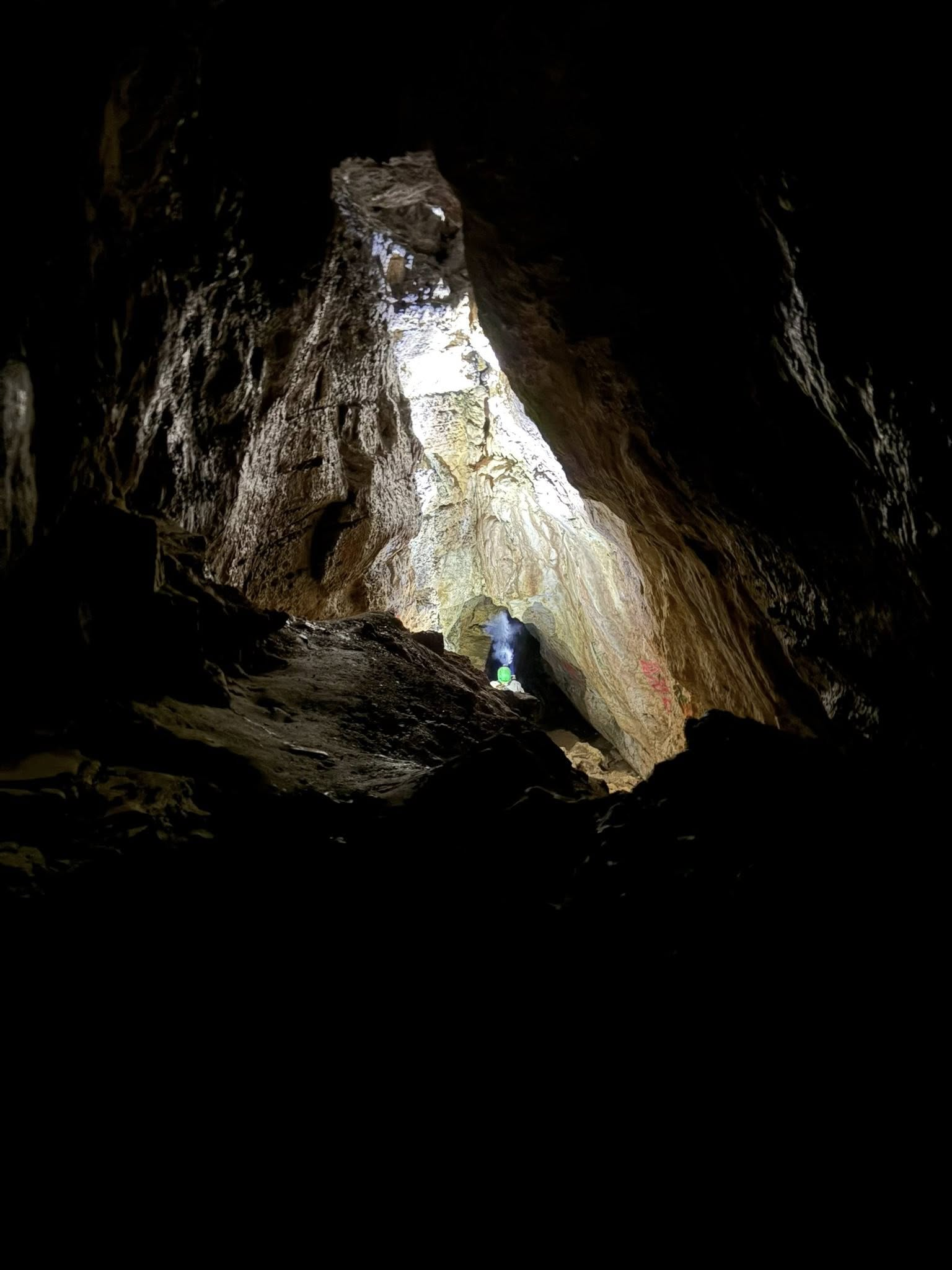
Tongue River Cave near the entrance. A researcher from the University of Wyoming documents the cave.

Tongue River Cave is in the Bighorn Dolomite. Mapped in 1969 by the National Speleological Society, Tongue River Cave contains 1.23 miles (1.98 km) of passages. The cave is 106 feet (32 m) deep. The cave is composed primarily of two separate river channels, one abandoned and the other active. The active stream passage is an underground portion of the Little Tongue River, which resurges farther east down the Tongue River Canyon. The active and abandoned river channels intersect approximately 0.5 miles (1 km) into the cave in a large chamber known as the Boulder Room. The upper channel is mostly dry and sandy, ending in a sand-filled chamber. The lower, active stream passage begins in a sump and ends in a narrow fissure. Attempts have been made to explore the cave's underwater portion, but low water temperatures and the difficulty of hauling adequate scuba equipment through tight passages have hampered the success of such efforts.

== Hydrology ==
In October 1974, fluorescent dye injected into surface waters of the Little Tongue River 2.6 miles (4.2 km) to the south of the cave appeared inside the cave's river, verifying speculation that the Little Tongue River is the source of the cave's stream passage. Waterfalls exist in places of rapid erosion and softer stone within Tongue River Cave, including a 24-foot (7.3 m) drop at the cave's Big Falls. Surface rain and snowmelt contribute to the river's level inside the cave, with rapid increases in water level possible even days after the surface event that triggered the increase occurred. Flash floods in the cave are a rare occurrence.

== Meteorology ==
The cave's temperature remains a constant 50 °F (10 °C) with near 100% humidity. Approximately 750 feet (230 m) into the cave, the main passage constricts into a narrow crawl where barometric equalization of the cave's atmosphere with that of the outside generates significant winds. Near the cave's entrance, condensation resulting from the meeting of the subterranean and surface air masses results in the cave's Rain Room, where water droplets fall in constant succession from the chamber's ceiling.

== Biology ==
Two species of bat inhabit Tongue River Cave, though their sighting has diminished in recent years. Townsend's big-eared bat (Plecotus Townsendii) and the fringed myotis (Myotis thysanodes) occupy the canyon, and have most likely relocated to less travelled habitats. A band of reclusive cave rats occupies the lower crawlways below the cave's entrance chamber.
