= Sheridan County School District Number 3 =

School district in Wyoming, United States

Sheridan County School District #3 is a public school district based in Clearmont, Wyoming, United States. With an enrollment of 101 students (as of October 1, 2008), it is the second smallest school district in the state of Wyoming.

== Geography ==
Sheridan County School District #3 serves the eastern portion of Sheridan County.

- Incorporated places
  - Town of Clearmont
- Census-designated places (Note: All census-designated places are unincorporated.)
  - Arvada
- Unincorporated places
  - Leiter

== Schools ==
- Arvada-Clearmont High School (Grades 9–12)
- Arvada-Clearmont Junior High School (Grades 7–8)
- Arvada Elementary School (Grades K-6)
- Clearmont Elementary School (Grades PK-6)

== Student demographics ==
The following figures are as of October 1, 2008.

- Total District Enrollment: 101
- Student enrollment by gender
  - Male: 46 (45.54%)
  - Female: 55 (54.46%)
- Student enrollment by ethnicity
  - White (not Hispanic): 92 (91.09%)
  - Hispanic: 6 (5.94%)
  - American Indian or Alaskan Native: 3 (2.97%)

== See also ==
- List of school districts in Wyoming
