= Ucross Foundation =

Nonprofit organization in Wyoming, USA

- Nickname: Ucross
- Formation: 1981
- Type: Nonprofit
- Website: https://www.ucrossfoundation.org

The Ucross Foundation, located in Ucross, Wyoming, is a nonprofit organization that operates a retreat for visual artists, writers, composers, and choreographers working in all creative disciplines.

== History ==
Founded in 1981 by Raymond Plank, Ucross is located on a 20,000-acre working cattle ranch in northeastern Wyoming. The Big Red Ranch Complex, which includes the Foundation’s main offices and a renovated barn that houses a public art gallery, was built in 1882 and is listed on the National Register of Historic Places. The name Ucross comes from the original brand of the Pratt and Ferris Cattle Company in the 1880s, which operated a large ranching concern with Big Red as its headquarters. Along with James Pratt and Cornelius Ferris, one of the early partners in the ranch was Marshall Field. The cattle brand for Pratt and Ferris Cattle Company had a U with a cross beneath.

== Residency, gallery, and outreach ==
The Foundation provides living accommodations, studio space, uninterrupted time in the High Plains landscape to competitively selected individuals, for two to six weeks. Up to ten individuals are in residence at any one time. The Foundation has four writing studios, four visual arts studios, and two composing studios and the Lauren Anderson Dance Studio, named for the first Black principal dancer for a major ballet company, in the Koehler Performing Arts Center. Approximately 115 individuals are supported annually.

Artists in residence live in their studios, the historic Ucross School House or the Clearmont Train Depot, which have been renovated to include four bedrooms each, with a dining area, living area, and main kitchen in the School House. Ucross has hosted over 2,600 artists-in-residence from across the United States and the world.

The Foundation participates in a number of long-term collaborations with other arts organizations, including the Sundance Institute Theatre Program, the Herb Alpert Award in the Arts (administered by CalArts and supported by the Herb Alpert Foundation), and the PEN/Hemingway Award for Debut Novel. Ucross also collaborates with the Alley Theatre, the Pew Fellowships in the Arts, The Ford Family Foundation Fellowship for Oregon Artists, the Whiting Foundation, the Ford Family Foundation, UCLA’s Center for the Art of Performance, Yale University, the Shepherd School of Music at Rice University, Cave Canem, and the Berklee Institute of Jazz and Gender Justice.

The renovated Ucross Art Gallery, located in the historic Big Red Barn, operates year-round at no cost to the public and typically features exhibitions by Ucross Fellows. The Foundation was named a recipient of the Wyoming Governor’s Arts Award for Excellence in the Arts in 2005.

== Fellows ==
Notable Ucross Fellows include Annie Proulx, Terry Tempest Williams, Elizabeth Gilbert, Theaster Gates, Anthony Hernandez, and Tayari Jones. National Book Award winners Susan Choi, Sigrid Nunez, and Sarah M. Broom have been residents, as have Academy Award and Tony winners Benj Pasek and Justin Paul, Emmy Award winner Billy Porter, recent Pulitzer Prize winners Michael R. Jackson and Colson Whitehead, and three-term United States Poet Laureate Joy Harjo. Others include Ron Carlson, Lan Samantha Chang, Du Yun, Joshua Ferris, Robert L. Freedman, Steve Giovinco, Perry Glasser, Francisco Goldman, Ricky Ian Gordon, Adam Guettel, Jessica Hagedorn, Porochista Khakpour, Michael Harrison, Emily Jacir, Stephen Jimenez, Ha Jin, Jeffe Kennedy, Byron Kim, Verlyn Klinkenborg, Tania Leon, Jason Moran, Bill Morrison, Ann Patchett, Sarah Ruhl, Mark So, Andrew Solomon, Manil Suri, Jean Valentine, Paula Vogel, Doug Wright, Charles Wuorinen, Liat Yossifor, and Liz Young.

== Land stewardship ==
Ucross has also supported numerous conservation initiatives, including the planting of thousands of trees on the ranch and the placement of a conservation easement on over 12,000 acres of the ranch with the Wyoming Chapter of The Nature Conservancy. In 2010, the Ucross Ranch, currently leased by the Apache Foundation, was named a finalist for the Leopold Conservation Award, given by the Sand County Foundation. The newest land initiative at Ucross involves the creation of a community park, The Park at Ucross.

The Park at Ucross hosts a small interdenominational chapel and The Raymond Plank Center, a modern structure that hosts art exhibitions, artists in residence, and regional and national conferences.
