= Ucross, Wyoming =

- Unincorporated community
- Location within Wyoming Location within the United States
- Coordinates: 44°33′39″N 106°32′24″W
- Country: United States
- State: Wyoming
- County: Sheridan
- Elevation: 4,082 ft (1,244 m)

Population (2020)
  - Total: 26
- Time zone: UTC-7 (Mountain (MST))
  - Summer (DST): UTC-6 (MDT)
- Area code: 307
- GNIS feature ID: 1609168

Ucross is an unincorporated community along the Piney Creek on the southern edge of Sheridan County, Wyoming, United States. Ucross is located at the junction of U.S. Route 14 and U.S. Route 16, 9.6 miles (15.4 km) west-southwest of Clearmont.

Ucross has a population of 26. It is part of the so-called UCLA of Wyoming — Ucross, Clearmont, Leiter and Arvada.

The community received its name from the Pratt and Ferris Cattle Company, whose logo had a U with a cross beneath it.

In 1981, the Ucross Foundation was created, and in 1983, the nonprofit began welcoming its first artists in residence. An artist residency on a 20,000-acre ranch, Ucross Foundation has a residency program that has hosted more than 2,600 artists, writers, composers, and choreographers. The Ucross Art Gallery is housed in the original Pratt and Ferris headquarters, the Big Red Barn. The renovated space offers a world-class gallery and attached dance studio and performance space.

== Notable persons ==
Walt Longmire mystery novels author Craig Johnson lives in a log cabin in Ucross.

Distinguished Ucross Foundation alumni include Annie Proulx, Terry Tempest Williams, Elizabeth Gilbert, Ann Patchett, Ricky Ian Gordon, Bill Morrison, Theaster Gates, Anthony Hernandez, and Tayari Jones. National Book Award winners Susan Choi, Sigrid Nunez, and Sarah M. Broom have been residents, as have Academy Award and Tony winners Benj Pasek and Justin Paul, Emmy Award winner Billy Porter, recent Pulitzer Prize winners Michael R. Jackson and Colson Whitehead, and three-term United States Poet Laureate Joy Harjo.
