= Odd Fellows Hall (Big Horn, Wyoming) =

- U.S. National Register of Historic Places
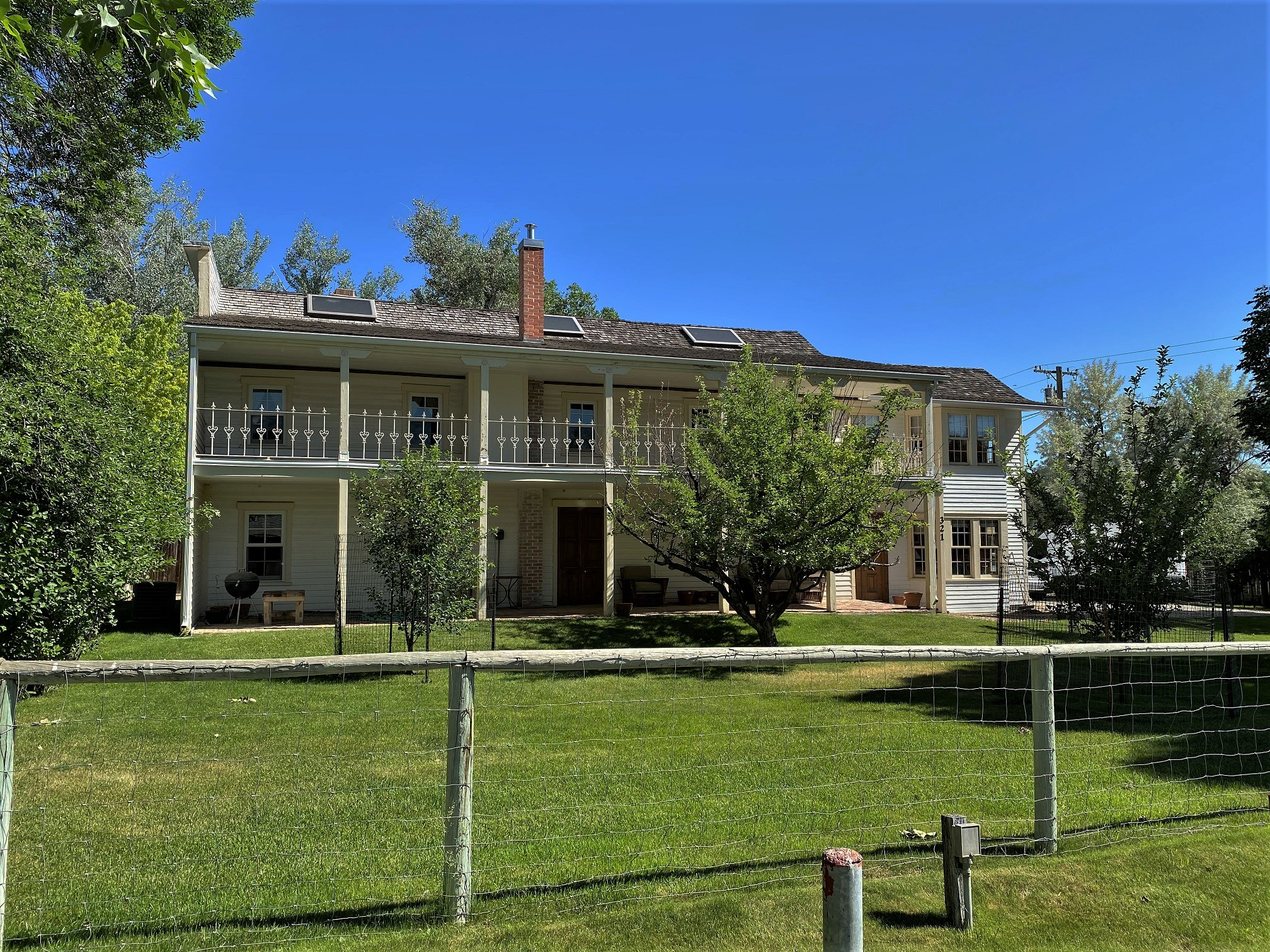

- Location within Wyoming Location within the United States
- Location: Jackson St. Big Horn, Wyoming
- Coordinates: 44°40′46″N 106°59′27″W
- Area: less than one acre
- Built: 1894
- Architectural style: Western false front
- NRHP reference No.: 80004052
- Added to NRHP: December 9, 1980

The Odd Fellows Hall, also known as Big Horn Odd Fellows Hall, is located in Big Horn, Wyoming, and was built in 1894. The hall was originally used by Big Horn's chapter of the Independent Order of Odd Fellows and was later used by the Odd Fellows' sister organization, the Rebekahs. The organizations hosted community events until the Odd Fellows merged with another chapter in 1949 and the Rebekahs disbanded in 1970; the groups mainly folded because they lacked the resources to maintain their building. The building features a false front, a common design feature in buildings in Western boom towns; it is one of three remaining historic buildings in Big Horn with a false front.

The hall was listed on the National Register of Historic Places in 1980.
