= Dayton Community Hall =

- U.S. National Register of Historic Places
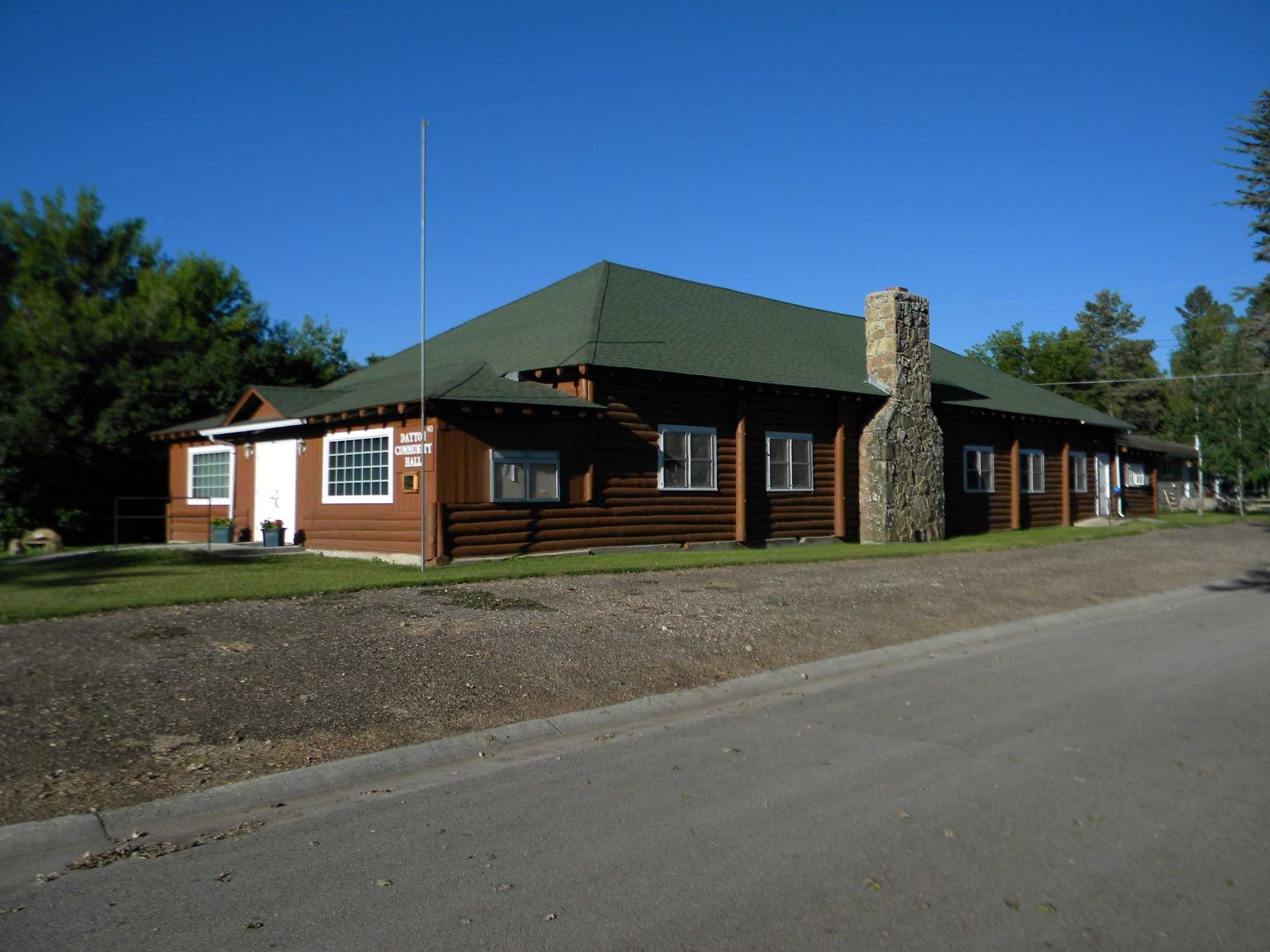

- Location within Wyoming Location within the United States
- Location: 410 Bridge St., Dayton, Wyoming
- Coordinates: 44°52′34″N 107°15′53″W
- Area: less than one acre
- Built: 1936
- Built by: Works Progress Administration
- NRHP reference No.: 05001338
- Added to NRHP: November 25, 2005

The Dayton Community Hall is a community building located at 410 Bridge St. in Dayton, Wyoming, United States. The hall was built in 1936 by the Works Progress Administration. The people of Dayton used the hall for community gatherings, as their previous event space at the Dayton Mercantile was no longer safe for activities. The hall was the largest such hall in the county, and the dances it hosted each Saturday night drew visitors from up to 50 miles (80 km) away. In addition to dances, the hall also hosted basketball games, Dayton Benefit Club meetings, local school events, and political functions. The hall continues to be used for local events.

The hall was added to the National Register of Historic Places on November 25, 2005.
