= EBF Bridge over Powder River =

- U.S. National Register of Historic Places
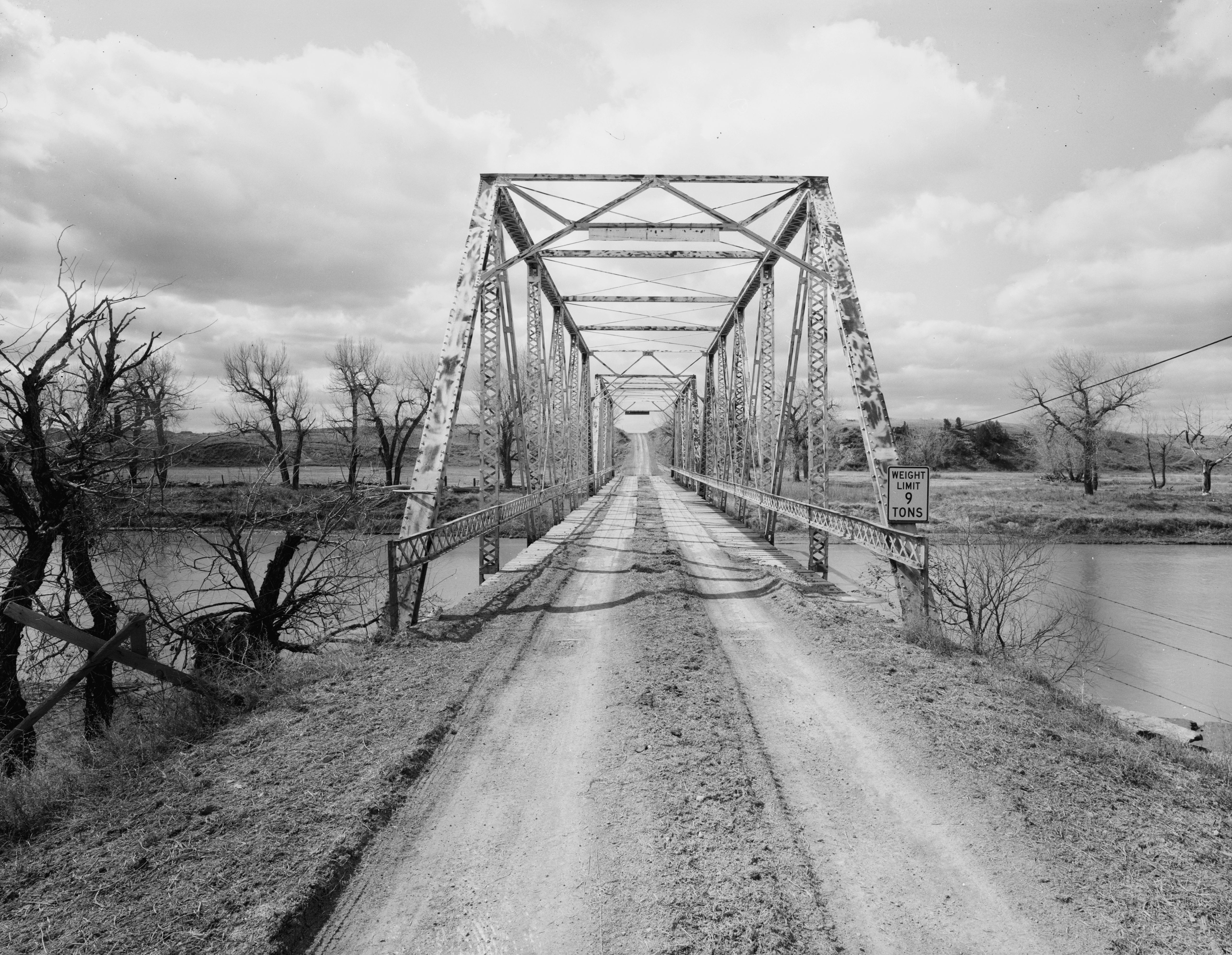
- The bridge in 1982

- Location within Wyoming Location within the United States
- Nearest city: Leiter, Wyoming
- Coordinates: 44°52′49″N 106°3′43″W
- Area: less than one acre
- Built: 1915
- Built by: Gregg & Stout Bridge Company
- Architectural style: Pratt/Warren through truss
- MPS: Vehicular Truss and Arch Bridges in Wyoming TR
- NRHP reference No.: 85000434
- Added to NRHP: February 22, 1985

The EBF Bridge over Powder River is a bridge located near Leiter, Wyoming, which carries Sheridan County Road CN3-269 over the Powder River. The 201.5-foot-long (61.4 m) bridge has two spans: the first span is a Pratt through truss, while the second span is a Warren truss. Due to this configuration, the bridge has been called "one of [Wyoming's] more interesting vehicular trusses." The trusses in the bridge are connected rigidly rather than by pins; the bridge was built in a transitional period between the two designs and is an early example of rigid connections. The Gregg & Stout Bridge Company of Sheridan built the bridge in 1915.

The bridge was added to the National Register of Historic Places on February 22, 1985. It was one of several bridges added to the National Register for its role in the history of Wyoming bridge construction.

== See also ==
- List of bridges documented by the Historic American Engineering Record in Wyoming
