= Robinson–Smith House =

- Robinson-Smith House
- U.S. National Register of Historic Places
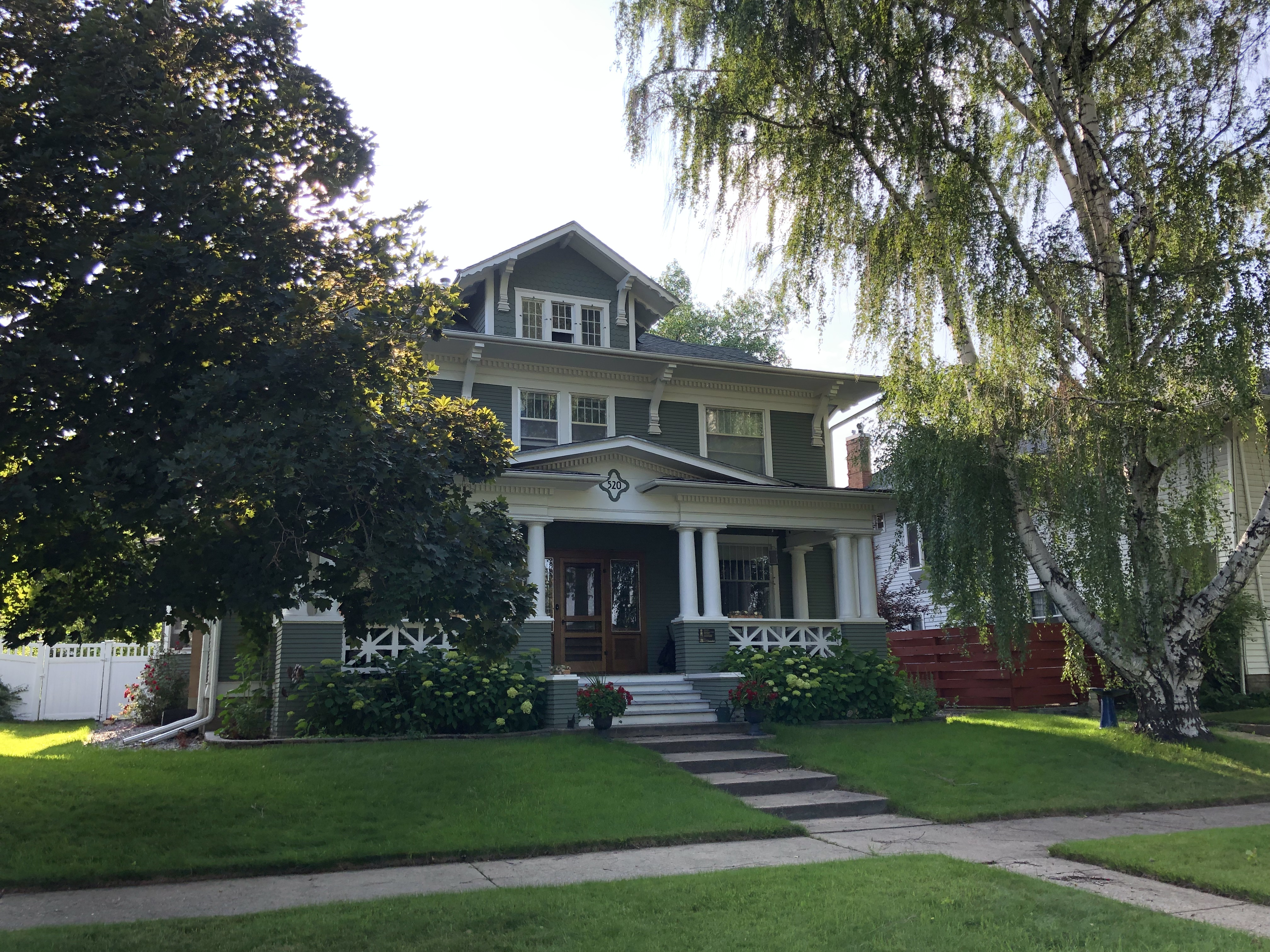

- Location within Wyoming
- Location: 520 South Brooks St., Sheridan, Wyoming
- Coordinates: 44°47′32″N 106°57′27″W
- Area: .18 acres (0.073 ha)
- Built: 1909
- Architectural style: American Foursquare
- NRHP reference No.: 16000207
- Added to NRHP: April 26, 2016

The Robinson-Smith House was built in 1909. It was listed on the National Register of Historic Places in 2016. It is American Foursquare in style. It was built by Glenn Charles McAlister (1873-1961), who was a self-trained architect.
