= Clearmont Jail =

Historic jail in Clearmont, Wyoming, US

- U.S. National Register of Historic Places
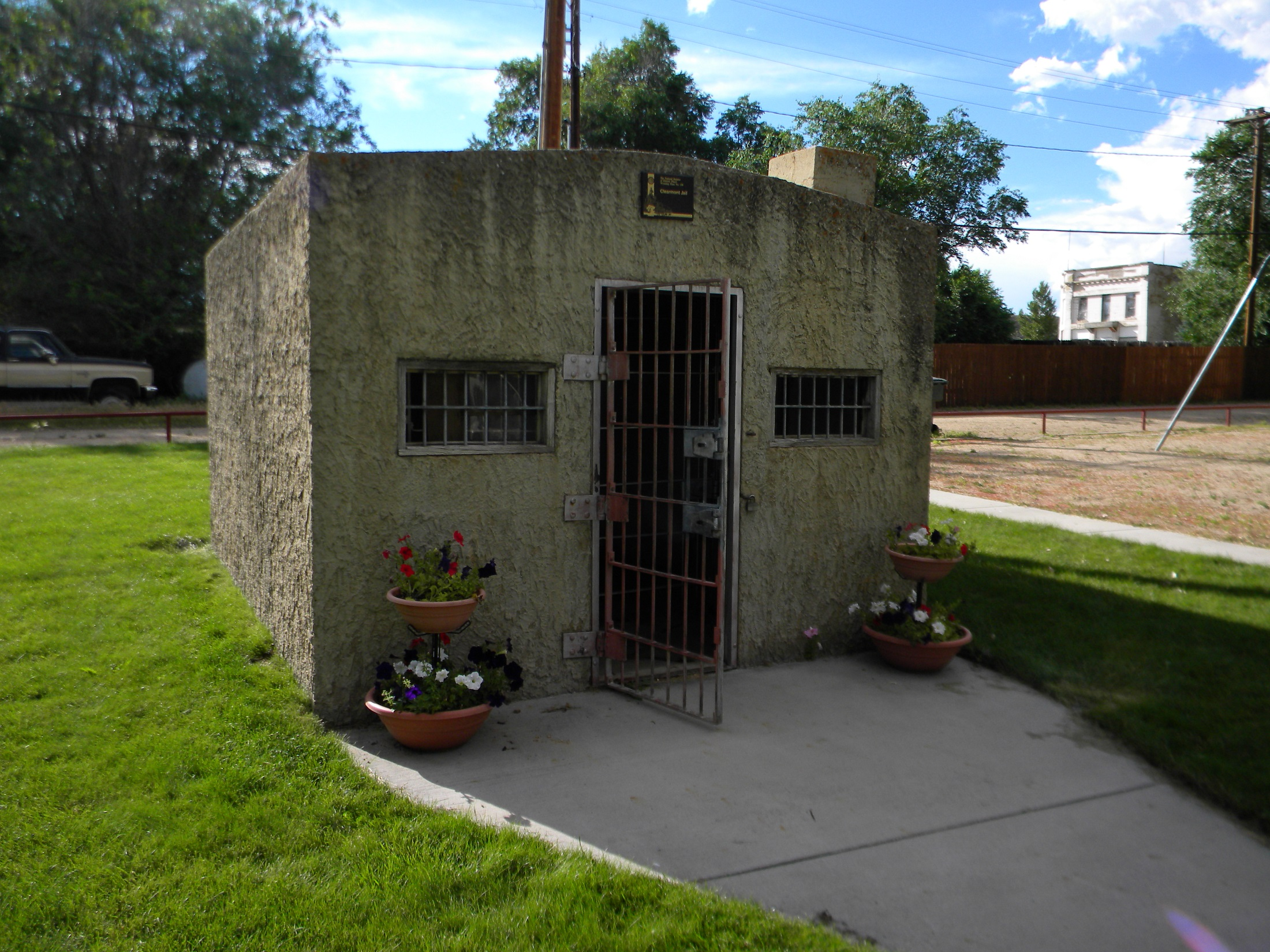

- Location within Wyoming Location within the United States
- Location: Water St., Clearmont, Wyoming
- Coordinates: 44°38′20″N 106°22′46″W
- Area: less than one acre
- Built: 1922
- NRHP reference No.: 84003698
- Added to NRHP: May 14, 1984

The Clearmont Jail is a historic jail located on Water Street in Clearmont, Wyoming. The jail was built in 1922, three years after Clearmont's incorporation, to address the growing crime problem in the town. During the 1920s, the jail was mainly used to house drunkards and bootleggers. Once Prohibition was repealed, the nature of crime in Clearmont changed, though by the 1950s the majority of criminals were still disruptive drunkards. By this point, the jail no longer had modern eating or restroom facilities; while this was considered a deterrent to crime by some residents, the jail stopped housing criminals after 1961 nonetheless. The jail is now a local tourist attraction.

The jail was added to the National Register of Historic Places on May 14, 1984.
