= Sheridan Railroad Historic District =

Historic district in Wyoming, United States

- U.S. National Register of Historic Places
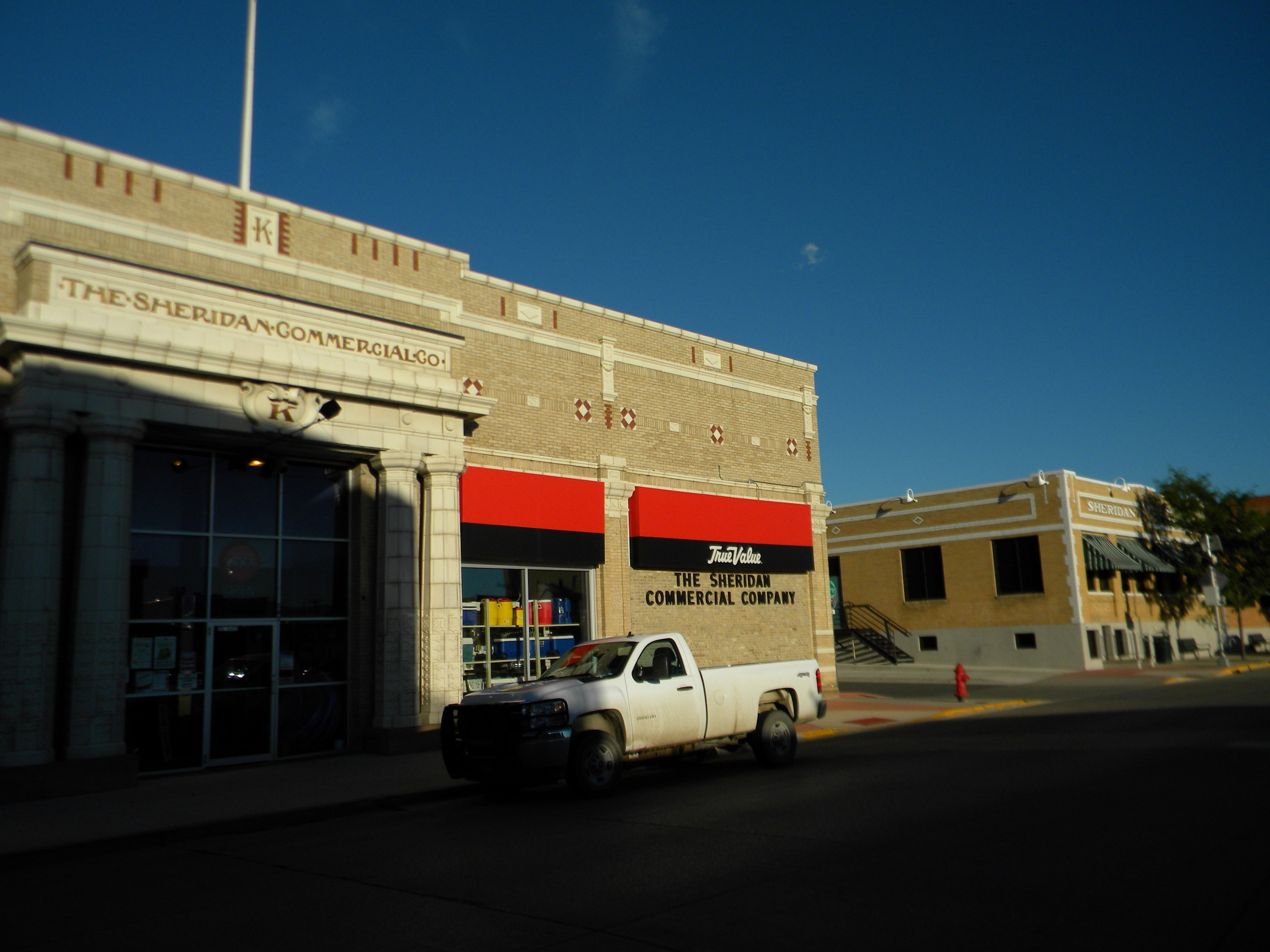

- Location within Wyoming
- Location: 201-841 Broadway, 508-955 N. Gould, Sheridan, Wyoming
- Coordinates: 44°48′19″N 106°57′11″W
- Area: 37 acres (15 ha)
- NRHP reference No.: 04001234
- Added to NRHP: November 12, 2004

The Sheridan Railroad Historic District, in Sheridan, Wyoming, is a 37 acres (15 ha) historic district which was listed on the National Register of Historic Places in 2004.

The district includes railroad-related resources and a preserved working-class neighborhood.

The district includes 110 contributing buildings and two contributing structures in an area including 201-841 Broadway and 508-955 N. Gould.

A master plan was created for development of the district.
