= Johnson Street Historic District =

Historic district in Wyoming, United States

- U.S. National Register of Historic Places
- U.S. Historic district
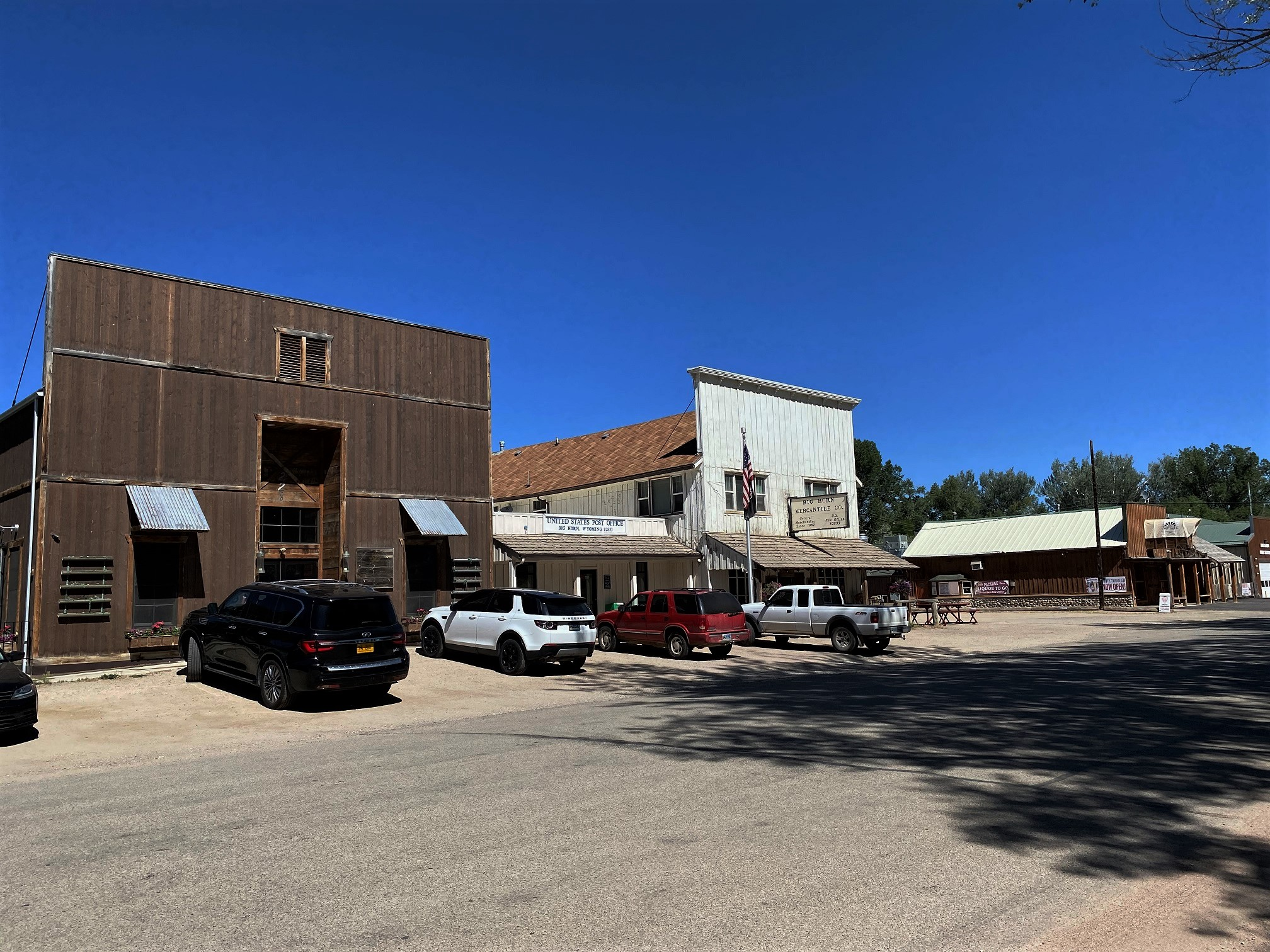

- Location within Wyoming
- Location: Johnson, 1st, and 2nd Sts., Big Horn, Wyoming
- Coordinates: 44°40′49″N 106°59′28″W
- Area: 1.9 acres (0.77 ha)
- NRHP reference No.: 84003701
- Added to NRHP: April 9, 1984

The Johnson Street Historic District, in Big Horn, Wyoming, is a 1.9 acres (0.77 ha) historic district which was listed on the National Register of Historic Places in 1984. The listing included five contributing buildings.
