= Sheridan County Fairgrounds Historic District =

Historic district in Wyoming, United States

- U.S. National Register of Historic Places
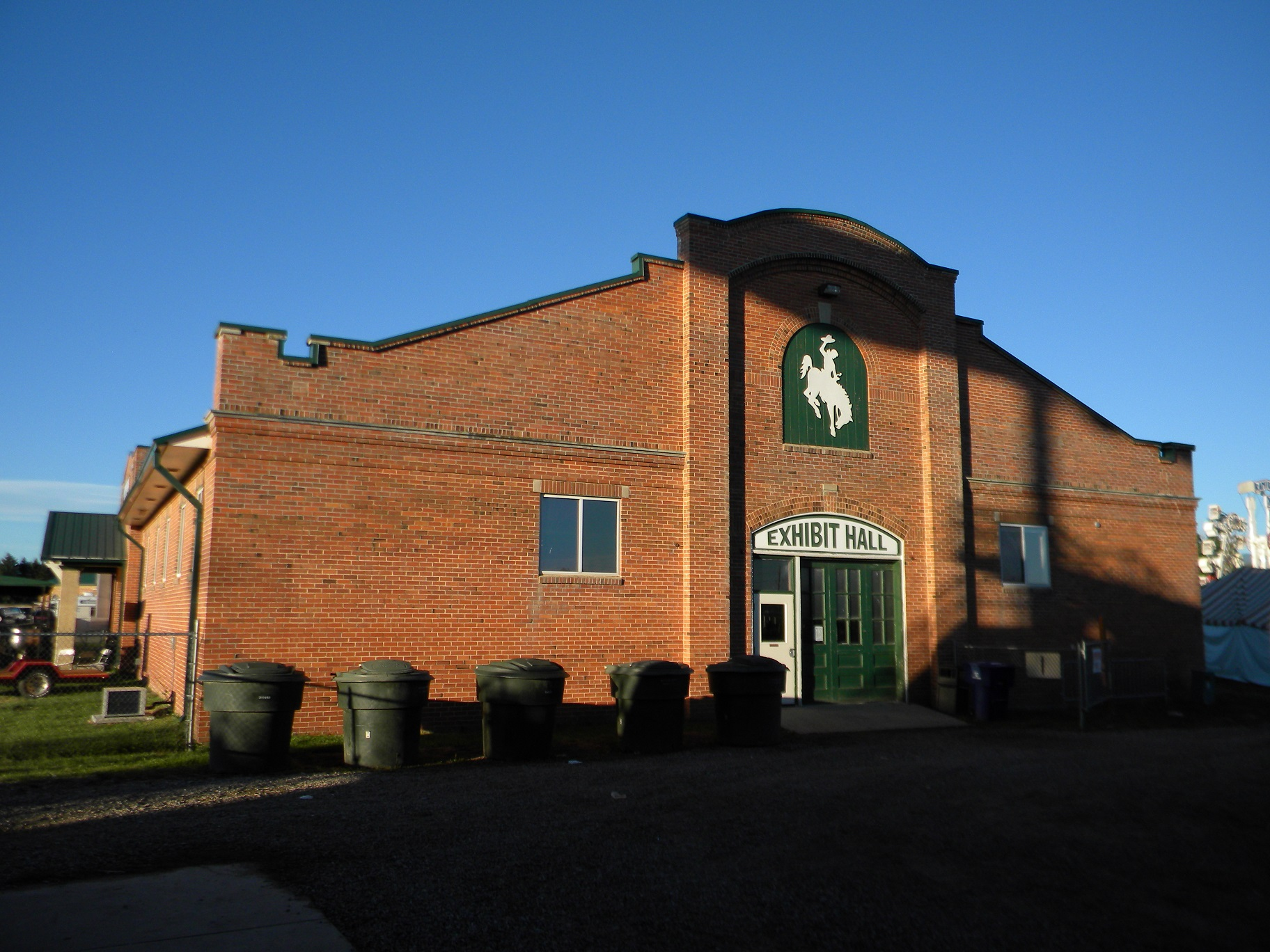

- Location within Wyoming
- Location: 1753 Victoria St., Sheridan, Wyoming
- Coordinates: 44°48′16″N 106°58′53″W
- Area: 7.9 acres (3.2 ha)
- Built: 1923
- Built by: Works Progress Administration
- Architect: Shaver; Wiberg; Cook & Whitney
- NRHP reference No.: 11000533
- Added to NRHP: August 10, 2011

The Sheridan County Fairgrounds Historic District, in Sheridan, Wyoming, includes works built in 1923. It was listed on the National Register of Historic Places in 2011. It included six contributing buildings.

It includes a 1923-built brick Exhibit Hall, three c.1939 Works Progress Administration-built sandstone buildings, a frame barn from the 1930s, and a frame horse stalls from 1950.

The most significant building is the sandstone octagonal Pavilion, which is also known as the Sale Barn, built during 1935–39.

The fairgrounds are upon a 40 acres (16 ha) site that was bought in 1906 by the Sheridan County Fair Association. The land had originally been homesteaded in 1895.
