= Quarter Circle A Ranch =

- The Brinton Museum
- U.S. National Register of Historic Places
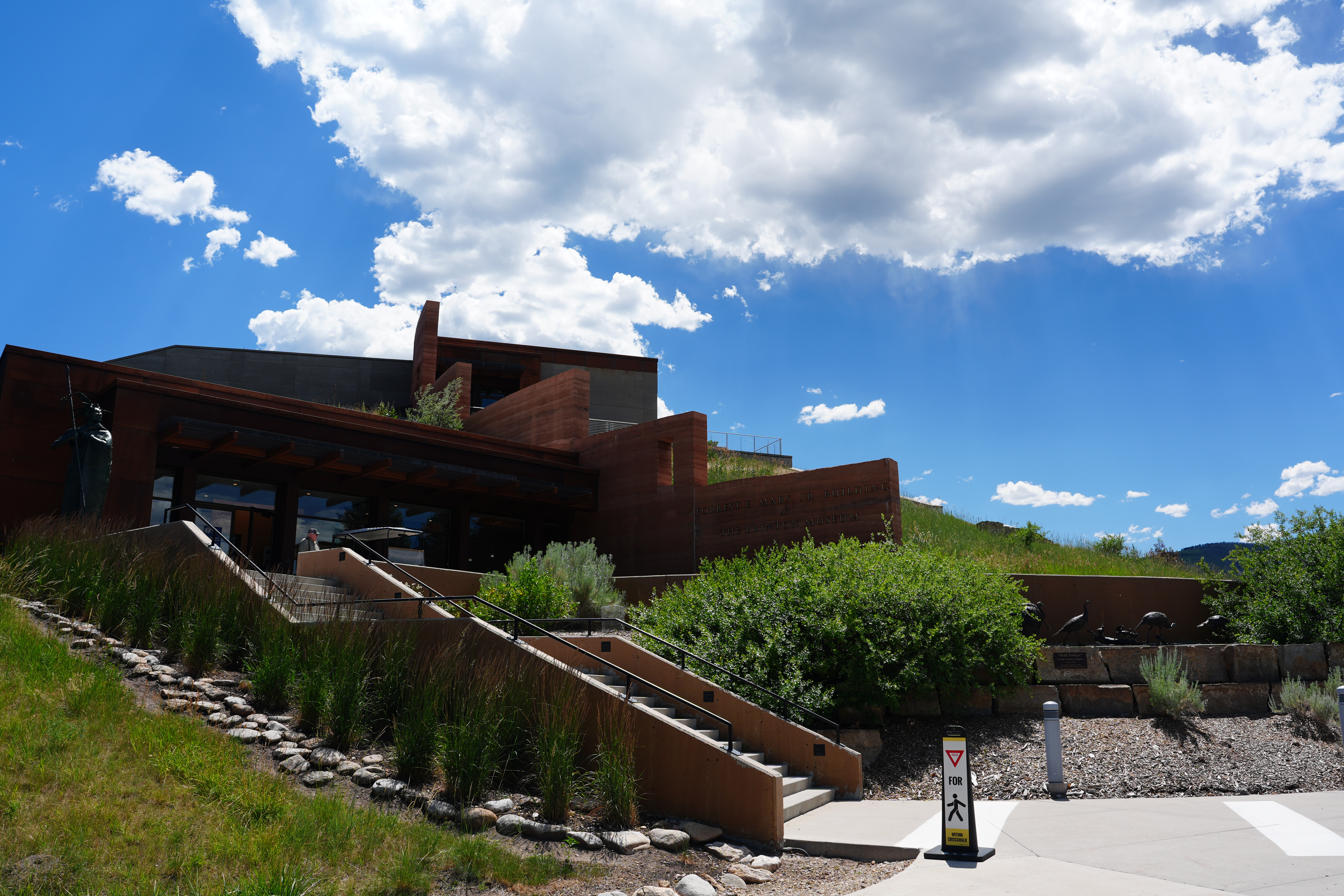
- Nearest city: Big Horn, Wyoming
- Coordinates: 44°38′26″N 107°00′53″W
- Area: 611 acres (247 ha)
- Built: 1893
- NRHP reference No.: 76001961
- Added to NRHP: August 10, 1976

The Quarter Circle A Ranch, formerly known as the Bradford Brinton Memorial Museum, is a museum and historic ranch located 2 miles (3.2 km) southwest of Big Horn, Wyoming. The ranch was built in 1893 by William Moncreiffe, a Scottish immigrant and successful businessman. In 1923, Bradford Brinton bought the ranch from Moncreiffe and expanded it to its current appearance. Brinton collected art and historical materials, particularly those relating to Native American history; after his death in 1936, his sister Helen converted the ranch to a museum displaying his collections.

The Brinton Museum holds art, historic documents, books and furnishings that made up Bradford Brinton's original collection. The permanent collection is on display in long-term exhibitions in the new facility and its original setting in the Brinton Ranch House, and complemented by rotating exhibits featuring art of the 19th, 20th and 21st centuries. The Brinton Museum also offers a restaurant on the top floor that requires reservations in advance.

The ranch was added to the National Register of Historic Places on August 10, 1976.

== History ==
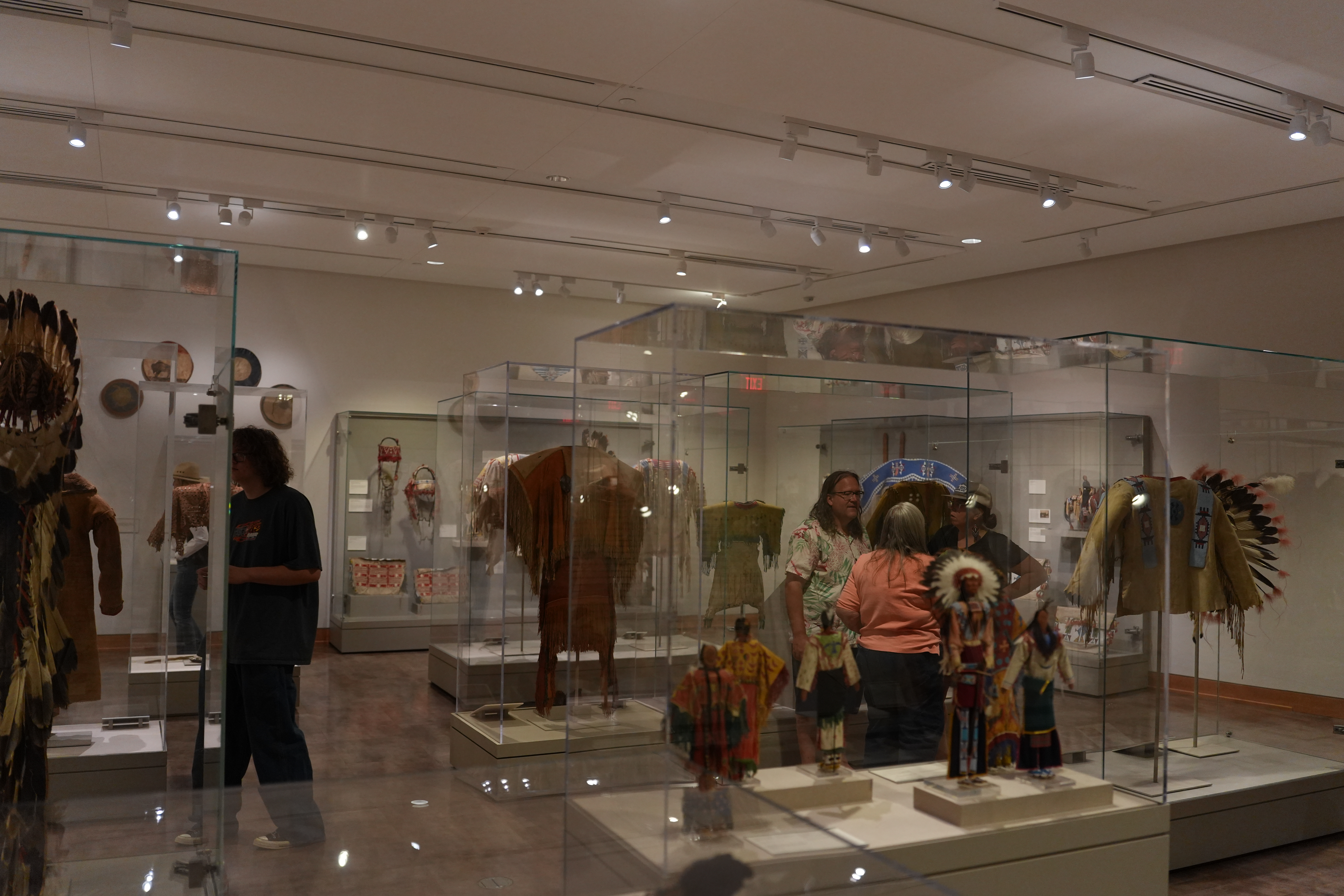
Great Plains Indian artifact gallery

The Brinton Museum opened its Forrest E. Mars Jr. Building in June 2015. The museum houses a collection of 19th and 20th century Western and American Indian Art featuring Frederic Remington, Charles Marion Russell, Thomas Moran, Edward Borein, Winold Reiss, and the largest Hans Kleiber collection in the world. It includes four galleries, a museum store and the Brinton Bistro, which offers indoor and outdoor dining with 180-degree views of the Bighorn Mountains.

Originally compiled by the Gallatin Family in Big Horn, highlights of the collection have been regularly displayed at the Art Institute of Chicago. The complete collection features more than 100 pieces of American Indian art and artifacts, 60 of which are on permanent display in the Brinton Museum's John and Adrienne Mars American Indian Gallery.

Bradford Brinton's sister, Helen Brinton, founded the Brinton Museum in 1960, and it was opened to the public as the Bradford Brinton Memorial in June 1961. Her mission was to share Brinton's original collection of art, historic documents, books and furnishings assembled in the early 1900s. The Brinton Museum presently showcases its historic and contemporary collections in long-term and changing exhibitions in the original Brinton Ranch House and throughout its Western, American Indian and contemporary galleries. The Quarter Circle A Ranch also includes gardens and a greenhouse, Little Goose Creek Lodge, and multiple 1900s-era buildings such as the Carriage Barn that houses a historic automobile, J.I. Case truck and various farm implements, and a saddle barn full of horse gear.
