= Steve Giovinco =

American photographer

- Education: Yale University
- Occupation: Photographer
- Awards: Artists’ Fellowship; Haven Foundation; The Mayer Foundation Grant
- Website: stevegiovinco.com

Steve Giovinco is an American photographer. He created a hand-held large-format (8x8") camera in 1992.

== Life and career ==
In the 1980s, Giovinco attended Yale University. In 1991 he had his first one-man exhibition, at the Kansas City Art Institute.

== Collections ==
Steve Giovinco's work is in several museum collections, including the Brooklyn Museum; the Museum of Fine Arts, Houston; Butler Institute of Art, Youngstown, Ohio; California Museum of Photography, Riverside, California; Lowe Art Museum, Miami, Florida.

== Exhibitions ==
- Myth of the Everyday, Fotogalerie Wien, Vienna, 2001. With Peter Freitag and Ursula Rogg.
- Myth of the Everyday, California Museum of Photography, Riverside, California, 2001.
- Photographs, Mednick Gallery, University of the Arts, Philadelphia, 2003.
- Home Show, Winnipeg Art Gallery, 2003. Group exhibition with Jeff Wall and Sam Taylor-Wood.
- Ambient Life, Velan Center, Turin, 2005.
- Eclipse: Recent Photographs, Jim Kempner Fine Art, New York City, 2007.
- About Time: Contemporary Photographs, Jim Kempner Fine Art, New York City, 2010. With five other artists.
- Edge of Darkness: Photographs by Steve Giovinco and Tim Simmons, Sheldon Art Gallery, St. Louis, 2012.
- The Kids Are Alright, John Michael Kohler Arts Center, Sheboygan, Wisconsin, 2012, with Catherine Opie.
- The Kids Are Alright, Weatherspoon Art Gallery, Greensboro, North Carolina, 2013, with Catherine Opie, Ryan McGinley.
