= Big Horn, Wyoming =

Big Horn
- CDP
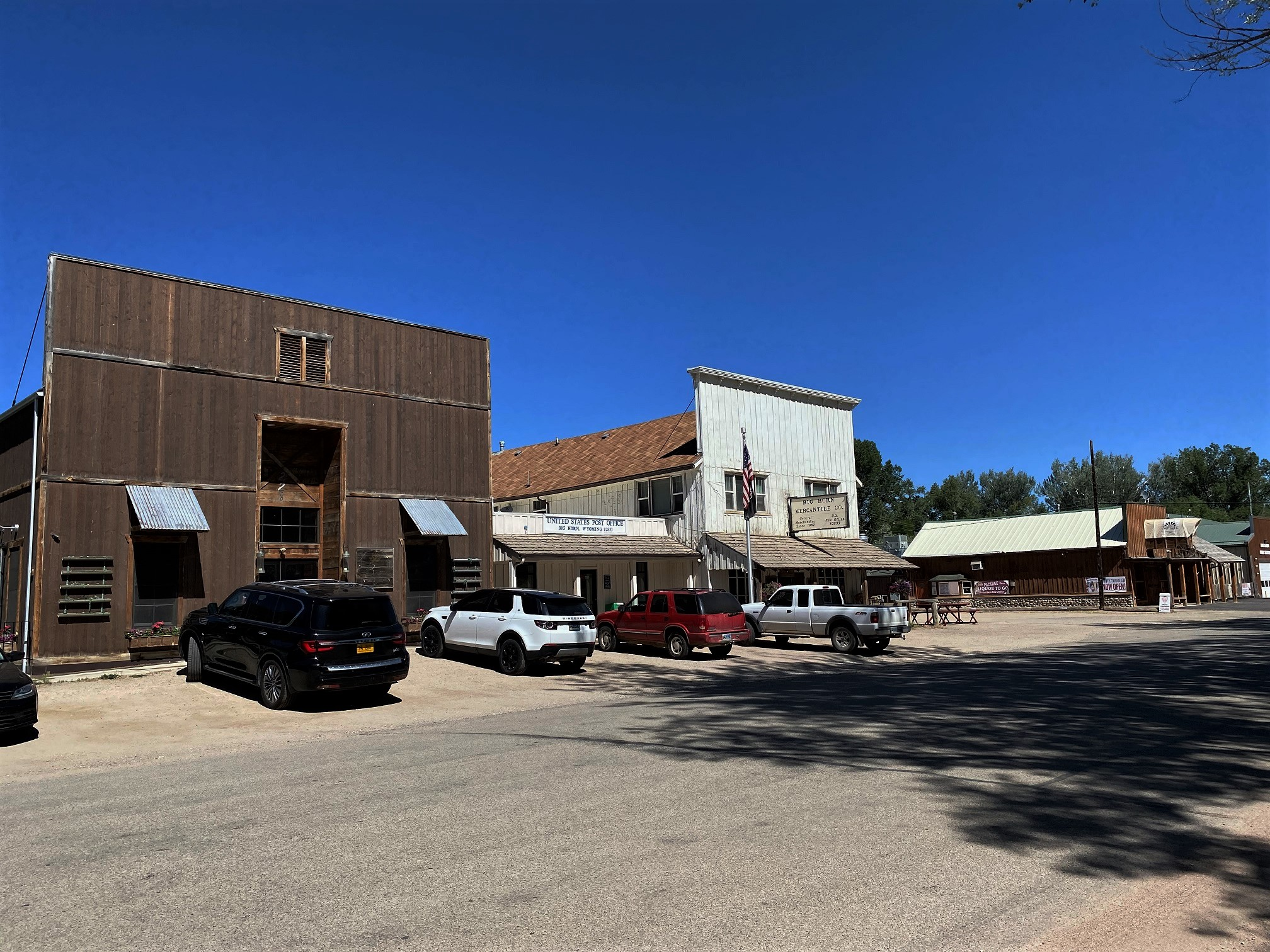
- Johnson Street in Big Horn

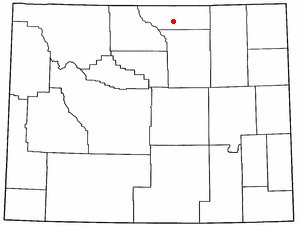
- Location of Big Horn, Wyoming
- Coordinates: 44°40′45″N 107°00′06″W
- Country: United States
- State: Wyoming
- County: Sheridan

Government
  - Type: Unincorporated

Area
  - Total: 1.8 sq mi (4.7 km^{2})
  - Land: 1.8 sq mi (4.7 km^{2})
  - Water: 0.0 sq mi (0 km^{2})
- Elevation: 4,111 ft (1,253 m)

Population (2020)
  - Total: 457
  - Density: 250/sq mi (98/km^{2})
- Time zone: UTC-7 (Mountain (MST))
  - Summer (DST): UTC-6 (MDT)
- ZIP code: 82833
- Area code: 307
- FIPS code: 56-06770
- GNIS feature ID: 2407840

Big Horn is an unincorporated community and census-designated place (CDP) in Sheridan County, Wyoming, United States. The population was 457 at the 2020 census.

== History ==
Big Horn is along the valley of Little Goose Creek. From 1866 to 1868, the military cutoff route of the Bozeman Trail crossed Little Goose Creek, where Big Horn was later located. The trail was used by travelers going to gold fields in Montana, but was plagued by Lakota attacks under Red Cloud. Fort Phil Kearny was established on Piney Creek, but continued harassment by the Lakota led to its abandonment and the withdrawal of the U.S. Army from the Powder River Country under the Fort Laramie Treaty of 1868.

According to local historian Glenn Sweem, the main route of the Bozeman Trail did not pass through the site where Big Horn was later founded. It lay farther to the east and followed Prairie Dog Creek, eventually leaving that drainage and taking a course now occupied by 5th Street in Sheridan. From there the trail crossed Goose Creek and continued out Soldier Creek to present-day Keystone Road, eventually crossing Tongue River between where Ranchester and Dayton, Wyoming, were later located.

Little Goose Creek was the site of General George Crook's camp after the Battle of the Rosebud against the Sioux and Cheyenne on June 17, 1876. Crook was fishing in the Bighorn Mountains on Tepee Creek while General George Custer fell to the Lakota and Cheyenne at the Little Bighorn, 70 miles (110 km) to the north.

The first settler in the Big Horn area was Oliver Perry Hanna, an adventurer, prospector, buffalo hunter, and Indian fighter who built a cabin on Hanna Creek in 1878. During the winter of 1878–79, he rode his horse north on the frozen Tongue River to hunt buffalo in the Yellowstone River Country. He participated in the massive hide harvest that wiped out the buffalo on the northern plains. His published recollections told of entire steamships loaded with buffalo hides floating down the Yellowstone River, as well as entire freight trains loaded with buffalo bones. After the buffalo hunting dried up, Hanna made a 400-mile (640 km) round trip to Fort Laramie to buy seed and a plow, becoming the first farmer to carve a furrow in what became Sheridan County. Hanna attracted many of the first settlers to Big Horn City, which was established in 1882. He operated the Oriental Hotel across the street from the Big Horn Mercantile for many years. William Frackelton, "The Sagebrush Dentist", credited Hanna as the inspiration for the Crow Tribe's involvement in a July 1902 reenactment of the Little Bighorn Battle in Sheridan.

According to local legend, Frank James and Big Nose George were hiding out along Little Goose Creek in 1878. Supposedly, things got "too hot" for them in the Black Hills, so they headed for the unsettled country near the Big Horn Mountains, where they encountered Hanna. This story has been passed down in the written recollections of early homesteaders, but has not been corroborated by outside historical references or the chronology of the James Gang. The Hilman family employed a mysterious man for a time, who regularly engaged in target practice with his pistol. The family believes this man was Butch Cassidy, based on a note left on his sudden departure from the ranch, which read: "This is the only home I have ever known—Robert Parker."

Polo was first played in the area at a summer fair in Sheridan in 1893. Among the players in the match were ex-members of the Ninth Lancers division of the English Cavalry, who had brought polo from India.

At one time Big Horn had nearly 1,000 residents, a college, a brick factory, a newspaper, two churches, a hotel, a livery barn, two saloons, and a mercantile. It made a bid to be the seat of Sheridan County, but an 1888 runoff election gave the title to Sheridan. There was an exodus of residents and businesses around 1891 when it was learned that the Chicago, Burlington, and Quincy Railroad was being surveyed through Sheridan. The railroad came to Sheridan in 1893, and since then Big Horn has been a satellite community of Sheridan. Today Big Horn has a mercantile, two bars, several bed-and-breakfasts, a women's club, the Bozeman Trail Museum, a park, and an art museum several miles up Little Goose Creek at the Moncreiffe/Bradford Brinton Memorial Ranch.

Queen Elizabeth II stayed in Big Horn in October 1984 during a visit with her friends Lord and Lady Carnarvon at Senator and Mrs. Wallop's Canyon Ranch, which is some five miles out of town to the south east.

== Geography ==
Big Horn is on the eastern slope of the Bighorn Mountains, along Little Goose Creek, a tributary of the Tongue River.

According to the United States Census Bureau, the CDP has an area of 1.8 square miles (4.7 km^{2}), all land.

=== Climate ===
According to the Köppen Climate Classification system, Big Horn has a semi-arid climate, abbreviated "BSk" on climate maps.

Climate data for Big Horn, Wyoming, 1991–2020 normals, extremes 2000–present
| Month | Jan | Feb | Mar | Apr | May | Jun | Jul | Aug | Sep | Oct | Nov | Dec | Year |
|---|---|---|---|---|---|---|---|---|---|---|---|---|---|
| Record high °F (°C) | 71 (22) | 73 (23) | 79 (26) | 86 (30) | 94 (34) | 102 (39) | 102 (39) | 101 (38) | 99 (37) | 91 (33) | 78 (26) | 74 (23) | 102 (39) |
| Mean maximum °F (°C) | 60.1 (15.6) | 58.4 (14.7) | 70.9 (21.6) | 77.8 (25.4) | 83.4 (28.6) | 91.4 (33.0) | 97.0 (36.1) | 97.0 (36.1) | 92.5 (33.6) | 81.7 (27.6) | 71.5 (21.9) | 61.3 (16.3) | 98.5 (36.9) |
| Mean daily maximum °F (°C) | 37.7 (3.2) | 38.0 (3.3) | 47.6 (8.7) | 54.5 (12.5) | 63.7 (17.6) | 74.1 (23.4) | 84.0 (28.9) | 83.8 (28.8) | 73.5 (23.1) | 58.8 (14.9) | 46.4 (8.0) | 37.7 (3.2) | 58.3 (14.6) |
| Daily mean °F (°C) | 26.3 (−3.2) | 26.3 (−3.2) | 35.3 (1.8) | 42.8 (6.0) | 51.9 (11.1) | 61.1 (16.2) | 69.2 (20.7) | 68.4 (20.2) | 59.0 (15.0) | 45.6 (7.6) | 34.4 (1.3) | 25.7 (−3.5) | 45.5 (7.5) |
| Mean daily minimum °F (°C) | 14.9 (−9.5) | 14.5 (−9.7) | 23.0 (−5.0) | 31.1 (−0.5) | 40.1 (4.5) | 48.2 (9.0) | 54.4 (12.4) | 53.0 (11.7) | 44.5 (6.9) | 32.5 (0.3) | 22.4 (−5.3) | 13.7 (−10.2) | 32.7 (0.4) |
| Mean minimum °F (°C) | −11.6 (−24.2) | −8.8 (−22.7) | 3.2 (−16.0) | 14.1 (−9.9) | 27.8 (−2.3) | 35.8 (2.1) | 44.5 (6.9) | 41.6 (5.3) | 30.4 (−0.9) | 14.0 (−10.0) | 0.1 (−17.7) | −8.6 (−22.6) | −17.1 (−27.3) |
| Record low °F (°C) | −20 (−29) | −27 (−33) | −18 (−28) | −2 (−19) | 10 (−12) | 29 (−2) | 40 (4) | 34 (1) | 16 (−9) | −7 (−22) | −16 (−27) | −28 (−33) | −28 (−33) |
| Average precipitation inches (mm) | 0.60 (15) | 0.62 (16) | 1.77 (45) | 2.42 (61) | 3.79 (96) | 2.30 (58) | 0.95 (24) | 1.06 (27) | 1.70 (43) | 1.95 (50) | 0.85 (22) | 0.58 (15) | 18.59 (472) |
| Average snowfall inches (cm) | 11.4 (29) | 16.1 (41) | 13.6 (35) | 10.2 (26) | 2.0 (5.1) | 0.0 (0.0) | 0.0 (0.0) | 0.0 (0.0) | 1.0 (2.5) | 6.2 (16) | 9.2 (23) | 11.7 (30) | 81.4 (207.6) |
| Average precipitation days (≥ 0.01 in) | 7.3 | 9.0 | 8.4 | 10.9 | 14.6 | 10.4 | 7.3 | 6.9 | 7.3 | 10.3 | 6.8 | 6.4 | 105.6 |
| Average snowy days (≥ 0.1 in) | 7.2 | 9.4 | 5.6 | 4.3 | 0.9 | 0.0 | 0.0 | 0.0 | 0.3 | 2.5 | 4.6 | 6.7 | 41.5 |
Source 1: NOAA
Source 2: National Weather Service (mean maxima and minima 2006–2020)

== Demographics ==
Historical population
| Census | Pop. | Note | %± |
|---|---|---|---|
| 2000 | 198 | | — |
| 2010 | 490 | | 147.5% |
| 2020 | 457 | | −6.7% |

As of the census of 2000, there were 198 people, 72 households, and 51 families residing in the CDP. The population density was 70.3 people per square mile (27.1/km^{2}). There were 76 housing units at an average density of 27.0/sq mi (10.4/km^{2}). The racial makeup of the CDP was 97.98% White, 1.52% Native American, and 0.51% from two or more races. Hispanic or Latino of any race were 1.52% of the population. 22.8% were of Irish, 22.0% German, 19.7% English and 7.1% Polish ancestry according to Census 2000.

There were 72 households, out of which 43.1% had children under the age of 18 living with them, 63.9% were married couples living together, 8.3% had a female householder with no husband present, and 27.8% were non-families. 22.2% of all households were made up of individuals, and 8.3% had someone living alone who was 65 years of age or older. The average household size was 2.75 and the average family size was 3.33.

In the CDP, the population was spread out, with 31.8% under the age of 18, 4.0% from 18 to 24, 23.2% from 25 to 44, 28.8% from 45 to 64, and 12.1% who were 65 years of age or older. The median age was 40 years. For every 100 females, there were 94.1 males. For every 100 females age 18 and over, there were 82.4 males.

The median income for a household in the CDP was $52,344, and the median income for a family was $56,875. Males had a median income of $50,938 versus $25,625 for females. The per capita income for the CDP was $23,217. None of the families and 1.2% of the population were living below the poverty line.

== Culture ==
Founded in 1882, Big Horn caught the eye of well-to-do cattle and sheep ranchers who established operations along the base of the Big Horn Mountains in the 1890s. These included the sheep-breeding Moncreiffe brothers (from Clan Moncreiffe of the Scottish Highlands), Oliver Wallop (a member of the English Nobility), Goelet Gallatin (a descendant of Albert Gallatin US Treasury Secretary under Thomas Jefferson), and Bradford Brinton (a businessman from Chicago). These residents of higher means were a minority among other residents who were owners or tenants on small ranches and farms. This trend has continued to the present day, with a number of distinguished but low-profile executives mixing with ranchers and upper-middle class residents, many of whom work in Sheridan, Wyoming. Land prices have risen dramatically in recent years, resulting in the subdivision of pastures that once served dairy farms and mid-size ranches. The large ranches along the base of the mountains have remained intact and largely undeveloped due to the foresight of residents who have established conservation easements on their properties.

From autumn to spring, most of the community activity in Big Horn centers around its K-12 school, especially during football season. In the summer months the community attracts polo players from around the world, who enjoy the laid-back atmosphere of Big Horn Polo and the Flying H Polo Club in comparison to the more aristocratic experiences to be had in Long Island, Palm Beach, Santa Barbara, Spain, and Argentina. In May, the Big Horn Equestrian Center often hosts the Mars Big Horn Mountain Spring Cup, a soccer tournament for dozens of Wyoming traveling teams. During the tournament three polo fields are converted into 18 regulation-size soccer fields.

Though Big Horn is an unincorporated community, it has several civic organizations including the volunteer fire department, a non-denominational church, Women's Club, Lion's Club, and the Big Horn City Historical Society, which has over 400 members nationwide.

== Flying H Polo Club ==
The Flying H Polo Club is one of the oldest polo clubs west of the Mississippi River. Polo first arrived in the area in the 1890s, brought by British expatriates, second sons who did not inherit estates but rather received remittance payments, who settled on local ranches. Several British men, including Oliver Wallop and the Moncreiffe brothers, began breeding polo ponies and hosting matches. A unique polo culture emerged in which local cowboys played the game with sons of lords. In the early 1980s, the Big Horn Equestrian Center opened.

== Schools ==
Public education in Big Horn is provided by Sheridan County School District #1.

Big Horn has a K-12 campus serving nearly 400 students. Graduating classes number approximately 40 students. Standardized test scores are routinely among Wyoming's highest due to small class size, excellent teachers and administration, and an involved community. Recent years have seen several National Merit Scholars and a graduate who was nominated for the Rhodes Scholarship. Several graduates are enrolled in doctoral programs and medical school. Big Horn has also earned a reputation for competitive athletic teams, with several state championships in football, volleyball, and girls basketball in the last decade.

Big Horn School uses a four-day week with classes from 8 am to 4 pm, and teacher in-service days on Friday. Though controversial at its inception, this non-traditional schedule allows for increased teacher training and curriculum development, and reduces the need for students to miss school to attend athletic contests and other extracurricular activities on Fridays. It also allows for a consistent three-day weekend, giving children more time to be nurtured in the home setting.

In 2009, the Wyoming School Facilities Commission approved plans for new school buildings to meet Big Horn's future education needs. In August 2010, construction was completed on a new two-story combined middle school/high school. A new elementary school was built on the current school property, in the location of the old middle school/high school which was demolished in the summer of 2010.

== See also ==
- List of census-designated places in Wyoming
