= Mount View (Sheridan, Wyoming) =

Historic house in Wyoming, United States

- U.S. National Register of Historic Places
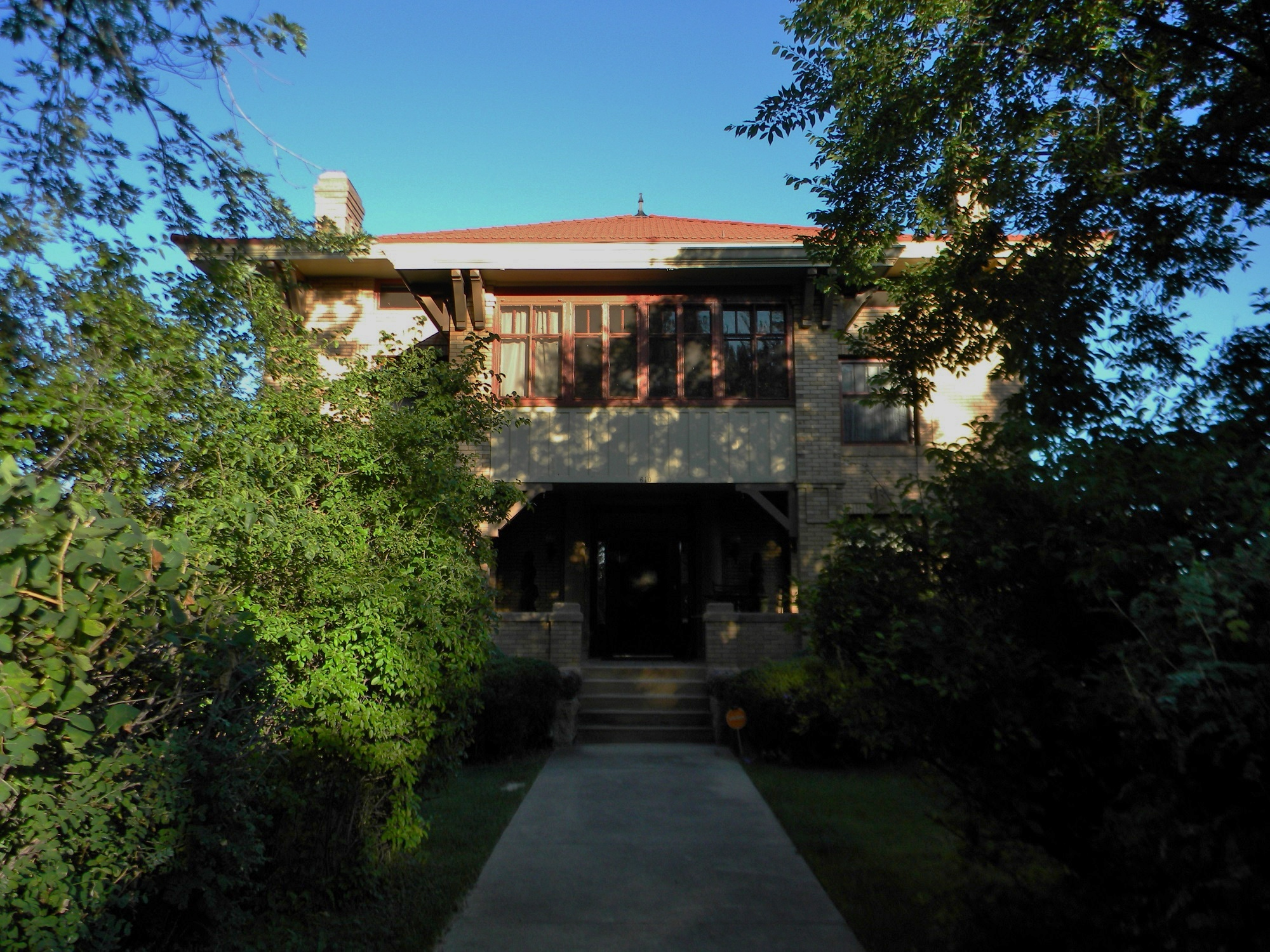

- Location within Wyoming Location within the United States
- Location: 610 S. Jefferson St., Sheridan, Wyoming
- Coordinates: 44°47′30″N 106°57′40″W
- Area: less than one acre
- Built: 1911
- Architect: Glenn Charles McAlister
- Architectural style: Prairie School
- NRHP reference No.: 97001534
- Added to NRHP: December 8, 1997

Mount View is a historic house located at 610 S. Jefferson St. in Sheridan, Wyoming. The Prairie School home was built from 1911 to 1912 and designed by Glenn Charles McAlister. The house features a hipped roof, overhanging eaves with paneled soffits and box cornices, bracketed corners, four brick chimneys, and a porch on each side. Lyman Brooks, a Sheridan businessman and politician who served in the Wyoming House of Representatives, was the house's first owner, and his family owned the home until the 1980s. The house was added to the National Register of Historic Places on December 8, 1997.
