= Bradford Brinton =

American machinery manufacturer

- Born: June 26, 1880; Tuscola, Illinois
- Died: February 15, 1936 (aged 55); Miami Beach, Florida
- Occupation: farm implement manufacturer

Bradford Brinton (26 June 1880 – 15 February 1936) was a machinery manufacturer whose collections of Western and American Indian art formed the basis of the collections of the Brinton Museum created as a memorial to him by his sister after his death.

== Early life ==
Brinton was born in Tuscola, Illinois to William B. Brinton, owner of several wagon and plow companies, and his wife, born Rhoda Wyeth. His only sibling, Helen, had been born in 1874.

Brinton attended Morgan Park Academy, and then Sheffield Scientific School at Yale University, where he was a member of Book and Snake and was graduated with a Ph.B. degree in 1904.

== Career ==
Brinton joined his father in the farm implement business, becoming secretary and then vice president of the Grand Detour Plow Company. The company merged with the J. I. Case Threshing Machine Company to become the J. I. Case Company, where Brinton was made general manager and then director. He became a manager of the King, Farnum & Company brokers, and a limited partner of the William Henry Barnum & Company, dealers in New York City real estate, as, successively, vice president, treasurer, and director.

Brinton was commissioned a captain in the Quartermaster Corps of the U.S. Army in 1917, and was involved with government testing of motor vehicles. He served overseas as liaison officer to the Motor Transport Corps in 1918 and took part in the Meuse-Argonne and Somme offensives.

== Personal life and death ==
Brinton married Catherine Bell Metcalf on 2 September 1916 in Chicago. They had twin daughters, Barbara, and Patricia, in 1926, and were divorced that same year.

Brinton died at the age of 56 of acute pancreatitis following surgery in Miami Beach, Florida and was buried in Dixon, Illinois. He left his ranch to his sister Helen, who used it as a summer home. On her death on 18 January 1960, she left the ranch in trust with the Northern Trust Company of Chicago, which administered it in accordance with her will as the Bradford Brinton Memorial & Museum. Hosting her brother’s collection of 17th, 18th and 19th century Western and Indian art, it subsequently was renamed “The Brinton Museum.”
