= Clearmont, Wyoming =

Town in Sheridan County, Wyoming, United States

- Town
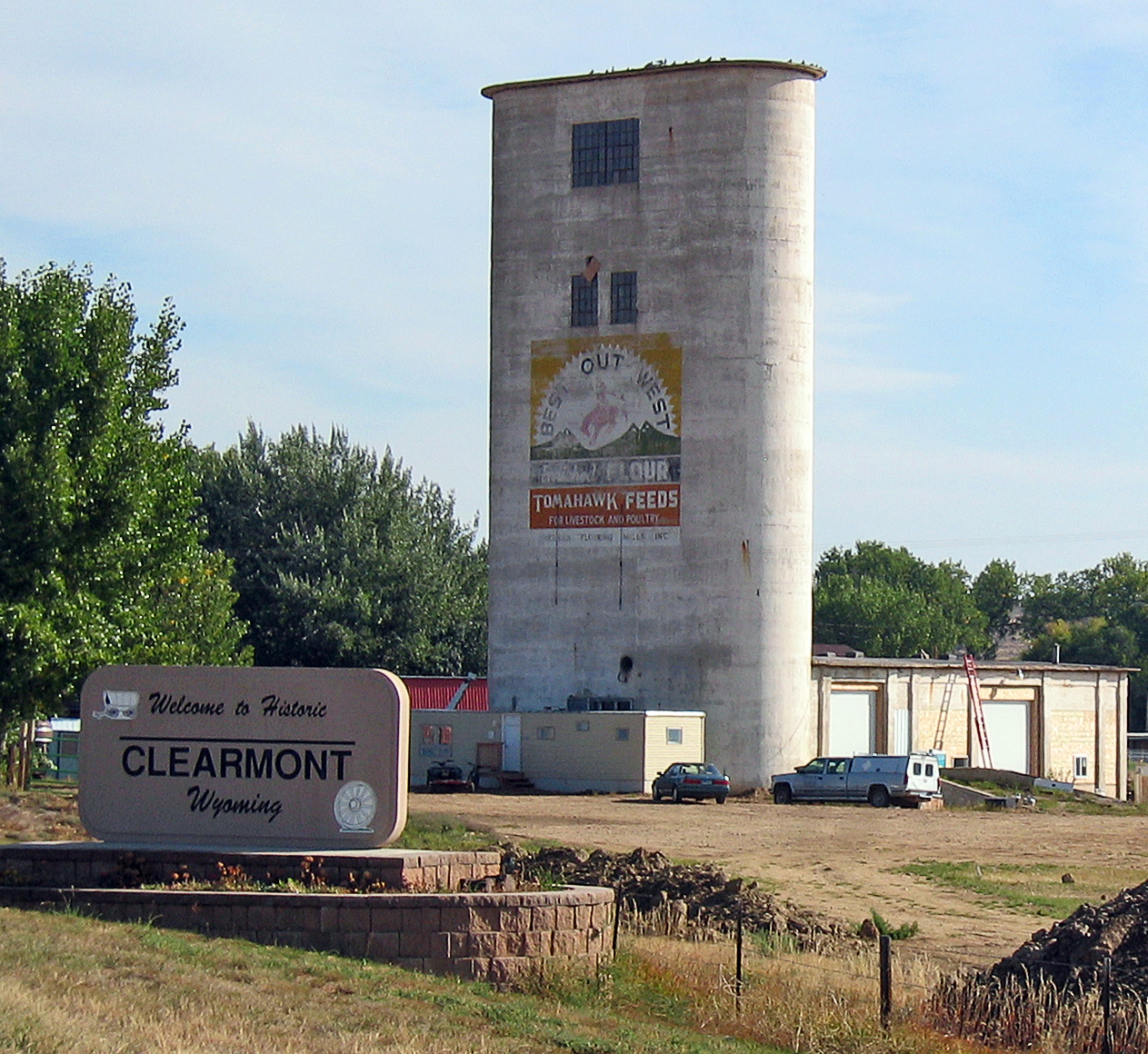
- Clearmont, Wyoming 2007

- Location of Clearmont in Sheridan County, Wyoming.
- Coordinates: 44°38′23″N 106°22′53″W
- Country: United States
- State: Wyoming
- County: Sheridan

Area
  - Total: 0.17 sq mi (0.43 km^{2})
  - Land: 0.17 sq mi (0.43 km^{2})
  - Water: 0 sq mi (0.00 km^{2})
- Elevation: 3,924 ft (1,196 m)

Population (2020)
  - Total: 116
  - Density: 700/sq mi (270/km^{2})
- Time zone: UTC−7 (Mountain (MST))
  - Summer (DST): UTC−6 (MDT)
- ZIP code: 82835
- Area code: 307
- FIPS code: 56-15325
- GNIS feature ID: 2413211
- Website: www.townofclearmont.com

Clearmont is a town in Sheridan County, Wyoming, United States. As of the 2020 census, Clearmont had a population of 116.

== History ==
Clearmont was platted in September 1892 but it wasn't until the early 1900s that businesses were built. The area was mainly settled by cattlemen. The post office was established in 1895. The name may have been chosen for the nearby Clear Creek and the view of the Bighorn Mountains. In 1892 the Chicago, Burlington and Quincy Railroad built a water stop. Due to the nearby ranches, Clearmont became a major shipping point for cattle. The depot also had passenger train service.

The town was incorporated in 1920. Building a jail and waterworks were the first priorities for the new town council. The Clearmont Jail was built in 1922 and placed on the National Register of Historic Places in 1984. A fire destroyed several businesses in the 1920s including the Rock Hotel and Saloon and a popular confectionery store.

Starting in the 1940s and lasting until the early 1970s, the town benefited from tourists traveling between the Black Hills and Yellowstone National Park. During that time the town had two motels, a bar, a soda fountain, a meat packing plant, and a cold storage business.

In 1945 the town had a German prisoner of war camp. The men were used to harvest sugar beets.

== Geography ==
Clearmont is located in the Clear Creek Valley.

According to the United States Census Bureau, the town has a total area of 0.16 square miles (0.41 km^{2}), all land.

=== Climate ===
According to the Köppen Climate Classification system, Clearmont has a cold semi-arid climate, abbreviated "BSk" on climate maps.

Climate data for Clearmont, Wyoming, 1991–2020 normals, extremes 1881–present
Month	Jan	Feb	Mar	Apr	May	Jun	Jul	Aug	Sep	Oct	Nov	Dec	Year
Record high °F (°C)	65 (18)	71 (22)	81 (27)	86 (30)	94 (34)	106 (41)	110 (43)	104 (40)	100 (38)	91 (33)	83 (28)	73 (23)	110 (43)
Mean maximum °F (°C)	53.9 (12.2)	56.4 (13.6)	70.4 (21.3)	79.1 (26.2)	84.8 (29.3)	93.2 (34.0)	98.6 (37.0)	96.9 (36.1)	92.7 (33.7)	82.3 (27.9)	68.9 (20.5)	54.6 (12.6)	99.7 (37.6)
Mean daily maximum °F (°C)	34.1 (1.2)	37.1 (2.8)	48.8 (9.3)	56.3 (13.5)	65.1 (18.4)	75.6 (24.2)	84.8 (29.3)	83.5 (28.6)	73.8 (23.2)	58.9 (14.9)	45.4 (7.4)	34.7 (1.5)	58.2 (14.5)
Daily mean °F (°C)	20.4 (−6.4)	23.6 (−4.7)	34.8 (1.6)	42.5 (5.8)	51.5 (10.8)	61.2 (16.2)	68.9 (20.5)	66.9 (19.4)	57.2 (14.0)	44.0 (6.7)	31.2 (−0.4)	21.0 (−6.1)	43.6 (6.5)
Mean daily minimum °F (°C)	6.6 (−14.1)	10.0 (−12.2)	20.7 (−6.3)	28.7 (−1.8)	38.0 (3.3)	46.7 (8.2)	53.0 (11.7)	50.3 (10.2)	40.6 (4.8)	29.1 (−1.6)	17.0 (−8.3)	7.4 (−13.7)	29.0 (−1.6)
Mean minimum °F (°C)	−17.2 (−27.3)	−13.1 (−25.1)	−0.8 (−18.2)	13.5 (−10.3)	24.3 (−4.3)	34.7 (1.5)	43.3 (6.3)	39.2 (4.0)	27.2 (−2.7)	12.0 (−11.1)	−4.1 (−20.1)	−13.6 (−25.3)	−24.1 (−31.2)
Record low °F (°C)	−46 (−43)	−37 (−38)	−24 (−31)	−5 (−21)	13 (−11)	24 (−4)	32 (0)	29 (−2)	6 (−14)	−16 (−27)	−32 (−36)	−48 (−44)	−48 (−44)
Average precipitation inches (mm)	0.44 (11)	0.39 (9.9)	0.75 (19)	1.38 (35)	2.42 (61)	1.96 (50)	1.45 (37)	0.66 (17)	1.15 (29)	1.16 (29)	0.46 (12)	0.37 (9.4)	12.59 (319.3)
Average snowfall inches (cm)	7.4 (19)	4.6 (12)	5.8 (15)	3.0 (7.6)	0.1 (0.25)	0.0 (0.0)	0.0 (0.0)	0.0 (0.0)	0.1 (0.25)	2.0 (5.1)	3.1 (7.9)	4.0 (10)	30.1 (77.1)
Average precipitation days (≥ 0.01 in)	2.4	1.8	3.4	5.6	7.3	6.6	4.5	2.6	3.4	3.6	2.1	2.0	45.3
Average snowy days (≥ 0.1 in)	2.9	1.8	1.5	0.6	0.1	0.0	0.0	0.0	0.1	0.6	1.4	1.8	10.8
Source 1: NOAA
Source 2: National Weather Service

== Demographics ==
Historical population
Census	Pop.	Note	%±
1930	214		—
1940	215		0.5%
1950	225		4.7%
1960	154		−31.6%
1970	141		−8.4%
1980	191		35.5%
1990	119		−37.7%
2000	115		−3.4%
2010	142		23.5%
2020	116		−18.3%
U.S. Decennial Census

=== 2010 census ===
As of the census of 2010, there were 142 people, 57 households, and 41 families residing in the town. The population density was 103.5 inhabitants per square mile (40.0/km^{2}). There were 66 housing units at an average density of 45.83 per square mile (17.7/km^{2}). The racial makeup of the town was 95.1% White, 3.5% Native American, 0.7% from other races, and 0.7% from two or more races. Hispanic or Latino of any race were 7.7% of the population.

There were 57 households, of which 40.4% had children under the age of 18 living with them, 52.6% were married couples living together, 12.3% had a female householder with no husband present, 7.0% had a male householder with no wife present, and 28.1% were non-families. 21.1% of all households were made up of individuals, and 1.8% had someone living alone who was 65 years of age or older. The average household size was 2.49 and the average family size was 2.78.

The median age in the town was 35.8 years. 30.3% of residents were under the age of 18; 4.1% were between the ages of 18 and 24; 25.3% were from 25 to 44; 34.5% were from 45 to 64; and 5.6% were 65 years of age or older. The gender makeup of the town was 45.1% male and 54.9% female.

=== 2000 census ===
As of the census of 2000, there were 115 people, 50 households, and 29 families residing in the town. The population density was 72.9 inhabitants per square mile (28.1/km^{2}). There were 65 housing units at an average density of 431.3 per square mile (45.1/km^{2}). The racial makeup of the town was 97.39% White, 0.87% from other races, and 1.74% from two or more races. Hispanic or Latino of any race were 3.48% of the population.

There were 50 households, out of which 28.0% had children under the age of 18 living with them, 36.0% were married couples living together, 14.0% had a female householder with no husband present, and 42.0% were non-families. 40.0% of all households were made up of individuals, and 10.0% had someone living alone who was 65 years of age or older. The average household size was 2.30 and the average family size was 3.00.

In the town, the population was spread out, with 26.1% under the age of 18, 6.1% from 18 to 24, 32.2% from 25 to 44, 28.7% from 45 to 64, and 7.0% who were 65 years of age or older. The median age was 40 years. For every 100 females, there were 105.4 males. For every 100 females age 18 and over, there were 93.2 males.

The median income for a household in the town was $40,833, and the median income for a family was $44,167. Males had a median income of $26,250 versus $20,500 for females. The per capita income for the town was $12,901. There were 19.4% of families and 20.0% of the population living below the poverty line, including 13.7% of under eighteens and 50.0% of those over 64.

== Economy ==
The area was first settled by cattlemen and ranching still has a major economic impact. Originally crop land was used to grow wheat and sugar beets but it has been converted to grow alfalfa hay and to graze livestock.

== Government ==
Clermont has a mayor and town council. There are four council members. The mayor in 2026 was Chris Schock.

== Arts and culture ==
Clearmont has a branch of the Sheridan County Public Library.

== Education ==
Public education in the town of Clearmont is provided by Sheridan County School District #3. Schools serving the town include Clearmont Elementary School (grades PK-6), Arvada-Clearmont Junior High School (grades 7-8), and Arvada-Clearmont High School District (grades 9-12).

== Media ==
Television and radio signals in the region originate from Sheridan and Gillette. Although KLQQ 104.9 FM is licensed to Clearmont, its transmitter is 36 miles west. Gillette stations are weak but receivable in Clearmont and Arvada.

== See also ==
- List of municipalities in Wyoming
