= Dayton, Wyoming =

- Town
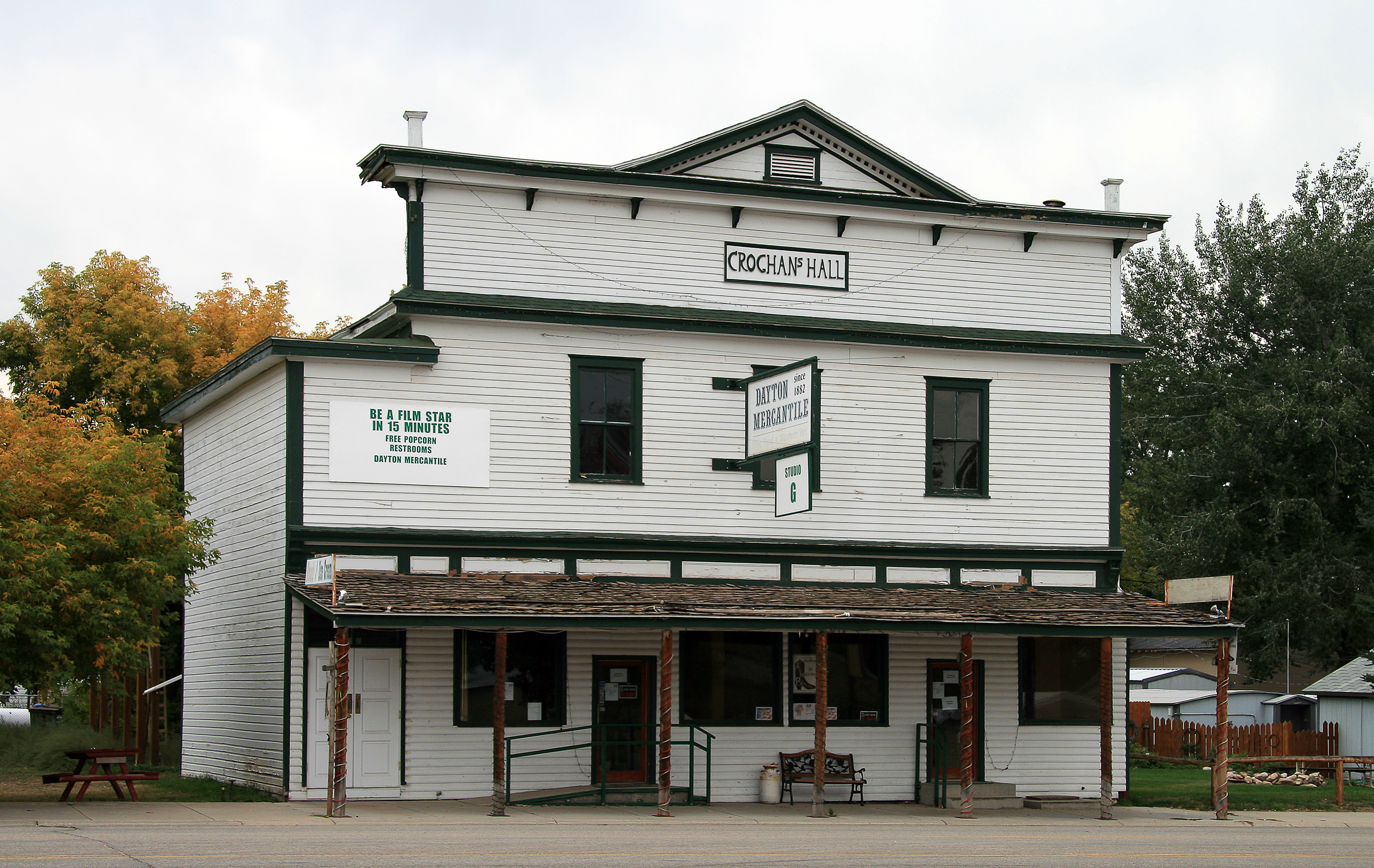
- Crochan's Hall, Dayton

- Location of Dayton in Sheridan County, Wyoming.
- Coordinates: 44°52′30″N 107°15′45″W
- Country: United States
- State: Wyoming
- County: Sheridan

Area
  - Total: 0.55 sq mi (1.42 km^{2})
  - Land: 0.55 sq mi (1.42 km^{2})
  - Water: 0 sq mi (0.00 km^{2})
- Elevation: 3,937 ft (1,200 m)

Population (2020)
  - Total: 822
  - Density: 1,500/sq mi (579/km^{2})
- Time zone: UTC-7 (Mountain (MST))
  - Summer (DST): UTC-6 (MDT)
- ZIP code: 82836
- Area code: 307
- FIPS code: 56-19385
- GNIS feature ID: 2412410
- Website: www.daytonwyoming.org

Dayton is a town in Sheridan County, Wyoming, United States. The population was 822 at the 2020 census. The town was incorporated in 1906.

== History ==
Dayton was a stage stop on the Bozeman Trail. It was named after Joe Dayton Thorn (1861-1942) in 1882 because he was one of the founding fathers of the city. The town claims to have had Wyoming's first rodeo held here in the 1890s. By the early 1900s the town had grown substantially, with three general stores, four saloons, a flour mill, and a stucco factory. The state fish hatchery was initially in Dayton until relocating to Story, Wyoming in 1909.

The town's first mayor was Neal Ketcham. In 1911 Dayton elected the first female mayor in Wyoming, Susan Wissler.

Dayton was home to the San Benito Monastery, a Roman Catholic monastery associated with the Benedictine Sisters of Perpetual Adoration, from 1989 to 2014.

== Geography ==
Dayton is at the confluence of the Tongue and Little Tongue Rivers. It is on U.S. Route 14, just east of the Big Horn Mountains.

According to the United States Census Bureau, the town has an area of 0.53 square miles (1.37 km^{2}), all land.

=== Climate ===
According to the Köppen Climate Classification system, Dayton has a warm-summer humid continental climate, abbreviated "Dfb" on climate maps.

Climate data for Dayton, Wyoming, 1991–2020 normals, extremes 2000–present
| Month | Jan | Feb | Mar | Apr | May | Jun | Jul | Aug | Sep | Oct | Nov | Dec | Year |
|---|---|---|---|---|---|---|---|---|---|---|---|---|---|
| Record high °F (°C) | 69 (21) | 71 (22) | 80 (27) | 85 (29) | 95 (35) | 107 (42) | 107 (42) | 102 (39) | 100 (38) | 90 (32) | 77 (25) | 76 (24) | 107 (42) |
| Mean maximum °F (°C) | 59.6 (15.3) | 57.1 (13.9) | 69.8 (21.0) | 78.7 (25.9) | 84.3 (29.1) | 93.1 (33.9) | 96.8 (36.0) | 96.0 (35.6) | 92.4 (33.6) | 80.9 (27.2) | 70.0 (21.1) | 58.1 (14.5) | 97.8 (36.6) |
| Mean daily maximum °F (°C) | 35.9 (2.2) | 38.1 (3.4) | 47.0 (8.3) | 55.3 (12.9) | 65.2 (18.4) | 75.1 (23.9) | 85.2 (29.6) | 84.3 (29.1) | 73.2 (22.9) | 58.9 (14.9) | 45.6 (7.6) | 35.7 (2.1) | 58.3 (14.6) |
| Daily mean °F (°C) | 23.1 (−4.9) | 25.0 (−3.9) | 33.5 (0.8) | 42.1 (5.6) | 51.3 (10.7) | 60.1 (15.6) | 68.2 (20.1) | 67.0 (19.4) | 56.8 (13.8) | 44.5 (6.9) | 31.9 (−0.1) | 22.9 (−5.1) | 43.9 (6.6) |
| Mean daily minimum °F (°C) | 10.2 (−12.1) | 12.0 (−11.1) | 20.0 (−6.7) | 28.8 (−1.8) | 37.5 (3.1) | 45.0 (7.2) | 51.2 (10.7) | 49.7 (9.8) | 40.3 (4.6) | 30.1 (−1.1) | 18.2 (−7.7) | 10.0 (−12.2) | 29.4 (−1.4) |
| Mean minimum °F (°C) | −15.9 (−26.6) | −12.5 (−24.7) | −0.9 (−18.3) | 11.8 (−11.2) | 25.1 (−3.8) | 35.0 (1.7) | 42.6 (5.9) | 39.5 (4.2) | 28.4 (−2.0) | 11.1 (−11.6) | −3.9 (−19.9) | −12.4 (−24.7) | −21.8 (−29.9) |
| Record low °F (°C) | −26 (−32) | −29 (−34) | −27 (−33) | −4 (−20) | 14 (−10) | 28 (−2) | 24 (−4) | 29 (−2) | 19 (−7) | −9 (−23) | −17 (−27) | −39 (−39) | −39 (−39) |
| Average precipitation inches (mm) | 0.82 (21) | 0.89 (23) | 1.49 (38) | 2.06 (52) | 3.36 (85) | 1.99 (51) | 1.16 (29) | 0.88 (22) | 1.55 (39) | 1.86 (47) | 1.15 (29) | 0.82 (21) | 18.03 (457) |
| Average snowfall inches (cm) | 10.8 (27) | 11.1 (28) | 12.0 (30) | 7.1 (18) | 1.4 (3.6) | 0.0 (0.0) | 0.0 (0.0) | 0.0 (0.0) | 0.3 (0.76) | 6.4 (16) | 7.5 (19) | 11.7 (30) | 68.3 (172.36) |
| Average precipitation days (≥ 0.01 in) | 6.7 | 6.8 | 8.2 | 10.3 | 11.2 | 9.8 | 6.5 | 5.7 | 6.9 | 8.8 | 6.6 | 6.6 | 94.1 |
| Average snowy days (≥ 0.1 in) | 5.7 | 6.1 | 4.8 | 2.8 | 0.4 | 0.0 | 0.0 | 0.0 | 0.2 | 1.9 | 4.0 | 6.5 | 32.4 |
Source 1: NOAA
Source 2: National Weather Service (mean maxima and minima 2006–2020)

== Demographics ==
Historical population
| Census | Pop. | Note | %± |
|---|---|---|---|
| 1910 | 313 | | — |
| 1920 | 136 | | −56.5% |
| 1930 | 303 | | 122.8% |
| 1940 | 240 | | −20.8% |
| 1950 | 316 | | 31.7% |
| 1960 | 333 | | 5.4% |
| 1970 | 396 | | 18.9% |
| 1980 | 701 | | 77.0% |
| 1990 | 565 | | −19.4% |
| 2000 | 678 | | 20.0% |
| 2010 | 757 | | 11.7% |
| 2020 | 822 | | 8.6% |
U.S. Decennial Census

=== 2010 census ===
As of the census of 2010, there were 757 people, 308 households, and 210 families living in the town. The population density was 1,428.3 inhabitants per square mile (551.5/km^{2}). There were 336 housing units at an average density of 634.0 per square mile (244.8/km^{2}). The racial makeup of the town was 93.9% White, 4.2% Native American, 0.3% Asian, 0.4% from other races, and 1.2% from two or more races. Hispanic or Latino of any race were 3.0% of the population.

There were 308 households, of which 32.1% had children under the age of 18 living with them, 57.1% were married couples living together, 7.1% had a female householder with no husband present, 3.9% had a male householder with no wife present, and 31.8% were non-families. 25.3% of all households were made up of individuals, and 10% had someone living alone who was 65 years of age or older. The average household size was 2.46 and the average family size was 3.00.

The median age in the town was 44.5 years. 25.4% of residents were under the age of 18; 3.8% were between the ages of 18 and 24; 21.4% were from 25 to 44; 33.9% were from 45 to 64; and 15.5% were 65 years of age or older. The gender makeup of the town was 49.7% male and 50.3% female.

=== 2000 census ===
As of the census of 2000, there were 678 people, 277 households, and 186 families living in the town. The population density was 1,429.1 people per square mile (557.0/km^{2}). There were 304 housing units at an average density of 640.8 per square mile (249.7/km^{2}). The racial makeup of the town was 94.69% White, 0.15% African American, 3.10% Native American, 0.44% Asian, 0.44% from other races, and 1.18% from two or more races. Hispanic or Latino of any race were 1.62% of the population.

There were 277 households, out of which 32.1% had children under the age of 18 living with them, 55.6% were married couples living together, 9.4% had a female householder with no husband present, and 32.5% were non-families. 27.4% of all households were made up of individuals, and 11.2% had someone living alone who was 65 years of age or older. The average household size was 2.41 and the average family size was 2.95.

In the town, the population was spread out, with 26.7% under the age of 18, 5.6% from 18 to 24, 24.2% from 25 to 44, 28.6% from 45 to 64, and 14.9% who were 65 years of age or older. The median age was 41 years. For every 100 females, there were 97.1 males. For every 100 females age 18 and over, there were 95.7 males.

The median income for a household in the town was $36,597, and the median income for a family was $41,500. Males had a median income of $30,909 versus $18,056 for females. The per capita income for the town was $16,389. About 4.0% of families and 7.0% of the population were below the poverty line, including 4.3% of those under age 18 and 7.7% of those age 65 or over.

== Government ==
Dayton has a mayor and town council. There are four council members. In 2026 the mayor was Clifford Reed.

== Arts and culture ==
The studio cabin of Hans Kleiber has been moved to Main Street. The Dayton Mercantile is also on Main Street and sells locally made candy as well as collectibles and antiques. The Dayton Community Hall, built in the 1930s, is still used for community activities.

Every July the town celebrates its founding with Dayton Days. It is a three day event that includes a parade and the "Cow Pie Classic" golf tournament. Other activities have been a rubber duck race, wheelbarrow and sack race, pickleball tournament, and water fight.

== Education ==
Public education in the town of Dayton is provided by Sheridan County School District #1. Dayton and Ranchester, Wyoming share schools. Dayton is the home of Tongue River High School, one of two high schools in the district. The elementary and middle schools are located in Ranchester.

== See also ==
- List of towns in Wyoming
- Tongue River Cave
