= Dayton Mercantile =

- U.S. National Register of Historic Places
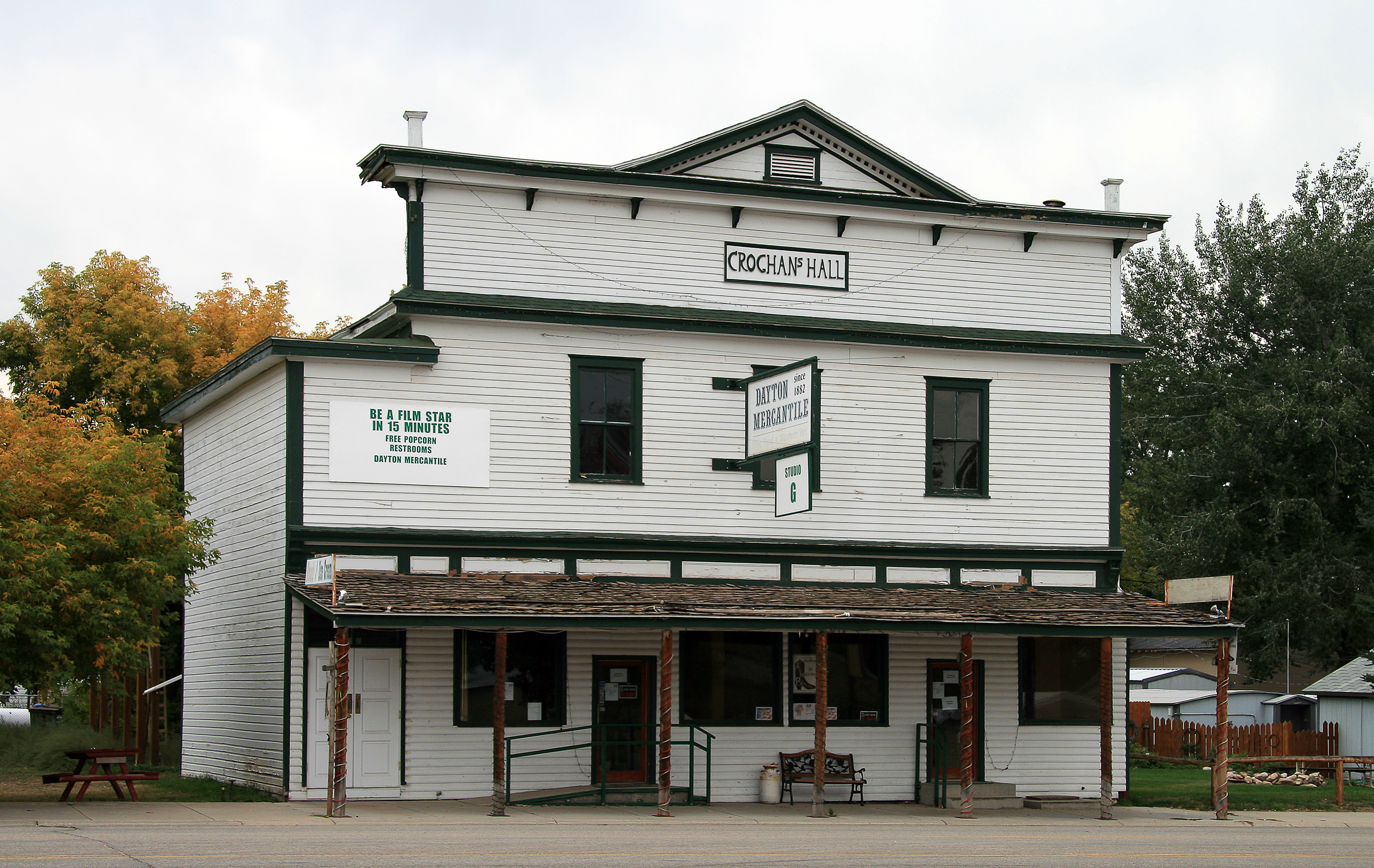
- Dayton Mercantile in 2007

- Location within Wyoming Location within the United States
- Location: 408 Main St., Dayton, Wyoming
- Coordinates: 44.875620°N 107.262737°W
- Built: 1882, 1901
- NRHP reference No.: 16000264
- Added to NRHP: May 12, 2016

Dayton Mercantile, is a historic building situated at 408 Main St. in Dayton in Sheridan County, Wyoming. It was added to the National Register of Historic Places in 2016.

It is a two-story wood-frame building built as a commercial general store in 1882 by Henry Baker, and enlarged to the rear in 1901 by Henry Croghan. Croghan opened a ballroom on the second floor called Croghan's Hall.
