= Leiter, Wyoming =

- Unincorporated community
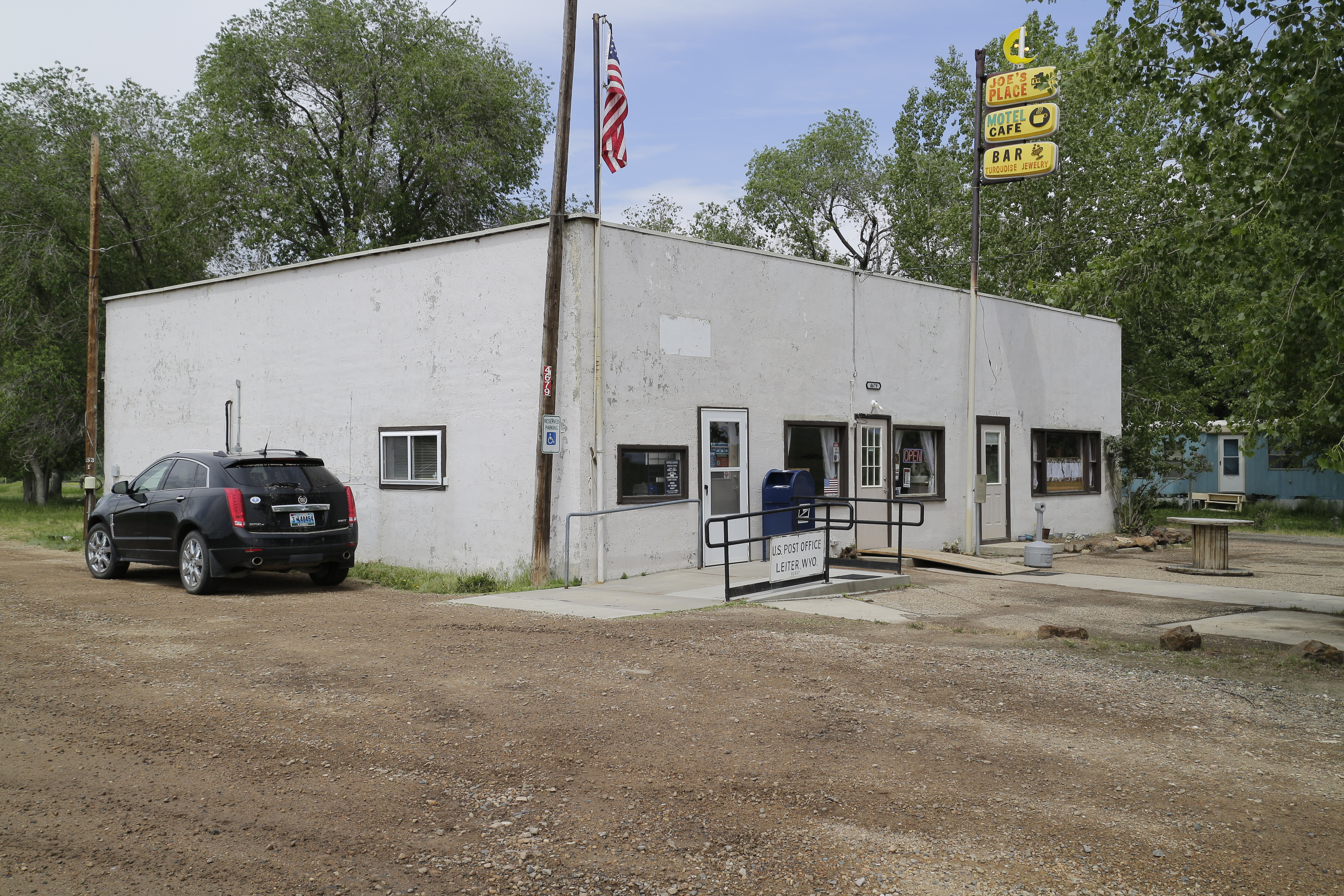
- Post office and business in Leiter

- Location within the state of Wyoming Leiter, Wyoming (the United States)
- Coordinates: 44°43′5″N 106°16′9″W
- Country: United States
- State: Wyoming
- County: Sheridan
- Elevation: 3,780 ft (1,150 m)
- Time zone: UTC-7 (Mountain (MST))
  - Summer (DST): UTC-6 (MDT)
- ZIP codes: 82837
- GNIS feature ID: 1597382

Leiter is an unincorporated community in eastern Sheridan County, Wyoming, United States, along Clear Creek. It lies along the concurrent U.S. Routes 14 and 16, east of the city of Sheridan, the county seat of Sheridan County. Its elevation is 3,779 feet (1,152 m). Although Leiter is unincorporated, it has a post office with ZIP code 82837. Public education in the community of Clearmont is provided by Sheridan County School District #3.

The location is named after Levi Z. Leiter (by reference to the Leiter estate), who owned a large ranch in the area.

== Climate ==
According to the Köppen Climate Classification system, Leiter has a hot-summer humid continental climate, abbreviated "Dfa" on climate maps.

Climate data for Leiter, Wyoming, 1991–2020 normals, extremes 1964–present
Month	Jan	Feb	Mar	Apr	May	Jun	Jul	Aug	Sep	Oct	Nov	Dec	Year
Record high °F (°C)	65 (18)	71 (22)	81 (27)	88 (31)	94 (34)	106 (41)	111 (44)	105 (41)	104 (40)	92 (33)	77 (25)	73 (23)	111 (44)
Mean maximum °F (°C)	52.5 (11.4)	55.7 (13.2)	69.5 (20.8)	78.1 (25.6)	85.0 (29.4)	95.2 (35.1)	101.4 (38.6)	99.5 (37.5)	95.3 (35.2)	82.1 (27.8)	66.6 (19.2)	54.5 (12.5)	102.3 (39.1)
Mean daily maximum °F (°C)	34.7 (1.5)	37.4 (3.0)	49.1 (9.5)	57.3 (14.1)	66.8 (19.3)	78.1 (25.6)	88.7 (31.5)	87.5 (30.8)	76.6 (24.8)	59.8 (15.4)	45.6 (7.6)	35.1 (1.7)	59.7 (15.4)
Daily mean °F (°C)	24.2 (−4.3)	26.6 (−3.0)	36.8 (2.7)	44.6 (7.0)	54.0 (12.2)	64.0 (17.8)	73.0 (22.8)	71.7 (22.1)	61.5 (16.4)	47.0 (8.3)	34.2 (1.2)	24.6 (−4.1)	46.9 (8.3)
Mean daily minimum °F (°C)	13.7 (−10.2)	15.7 (−9.1)	24.4 (−4.2)	31.9 (−0.1)	41.1 (5.1)	50.0 (10.0)	57.4 (14.1)	56.0 (13.3)	46.3 (7.9)	34.1 (1.2)	22.8 (−5.1)	14.1 (−9.9)	34.0 (1.1)
Mean minimum °F (°C)	−10.5 (−23.6)	−7.0 (−21.7)	3.9 (−15.6)	17.1 (−8.3)	27.9 (−2.3)	38.1 (3.4)	47.6 (8.7)	44.1 (6.7)	31.5 (−0.3)	15.3 (−9.3)	0.8 (−17.3)	−7.1 (−21.7)	−17.8 (−27.7)
Record low °F (°C)	−34 (−37)	−35 (−37)	−19 (−28)	−1 (−18)	15 (−9)	31 (−1)	38 (3)	34 (1)	12 (−11)	−13 (−25)	−20 (−29)	−36 (−38)	−36 (−38)
Average precipitation inches (mm)	0.55 (14)	0.50 (13)	1.04 (26)	1.82 (46)	2.71 (69)	2.31 (59)	1.72 (44)	0.80 (20)	1.28 (33)	1.59 (40)	0.65 (17)	0.58 (15)	15.55 (396)
Average snowfall inches (cm)	9.1 (23)	7.7 (20)	8.6 (22)	7.7 (20)	1.2 (3.0)	0.0 (0.0)	0.0 (0.0)	0.0 (0.0)	0.4 (1.0)	4.2 (11)	6.4 (16)	8.1 (21)	53.4 (137)
Average precipitation days (≥ 0.01 in)	7.2	6.4	8.2	9.2	9.8	8.6	7.0	4.5	5.4	8.0	6.2	6.4	86.9
Average snowy days (≥ 0.1 in)	6.9	5.9	5.9	3.2	0.5	0.0	0.0	0.0	0.2	2.2	4.8	6.1	35.7
Source 1: NOAA
Source 2: National Weather Service
