= Tongue River Reservoir State Park =

State park in Montana, USA

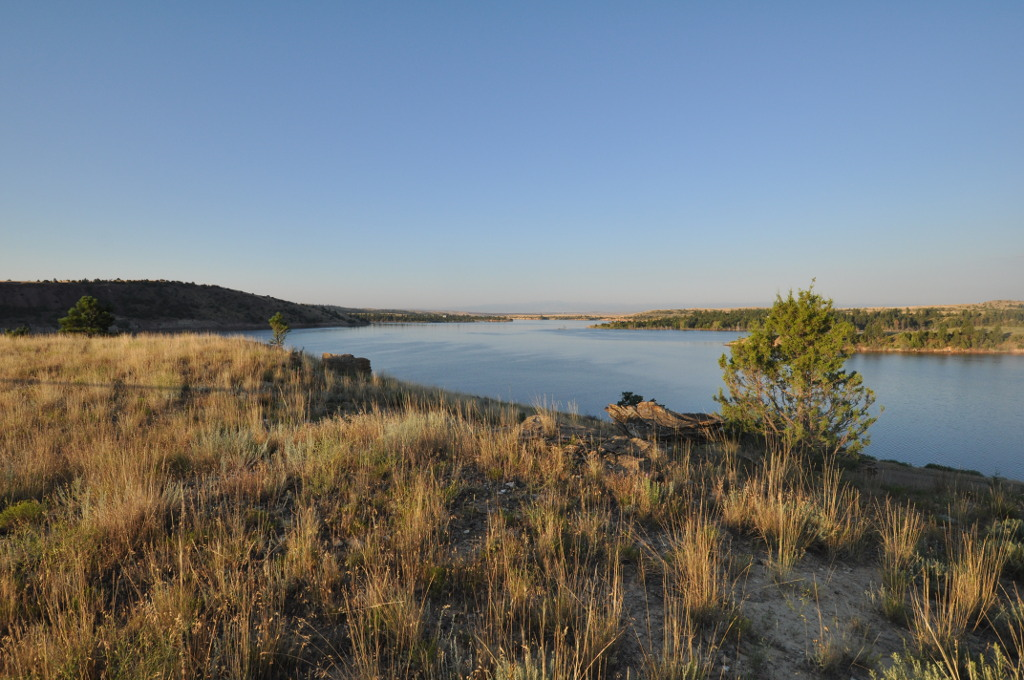

- Location within Montana
- Location: Big Horn County, Montana, United States
- Nearest town: Decker, Montana
- Coordinates: 45°05′59″N 106°47′40″W
- Area: 642 acres (260 ha)
- Elevation: 3,468 ft (1,057 m)
- Designation: Montana state park
- Established: 1983
- Visitors: 99,232 (in 2023)
- Administrator: Montana Fish, Wildlife & Parks
- Website: Tongue River Reservoir State Park

Tongue River Reservoir State Park is a public recreation area located 6 miles north of Decker, Montana, on the western shore of the Tongue River Reservoir. The 12-mile-long reservoir is an impoundment of the Tongue River. The state park, occupying 642 acres at an elevation of 3468 feet, offers boating, fishing, camping, swimming, wildlife viewing, and a seasonal marina.

== Fishing ==
This state park offers a 3,600 acre reservoir that is regularly stocked for fishing. Management emphases is for crappie, smallmouth bass, northern pike, and walleye.

Fish species within the reservoir
Species	Family	Class	Native to MT
Black Bullhead	Catfish	Warmwater	Introduced
Black Crappie	Sunfish	Warmwater	Introduced
Bluegill	Sunfish	Warmwater	Introduced
Brown Trout	Trout	Coldwater	Introduced
Channel Catfish	Catfish	Warmwater	Native
Common Carp	Minnow	Warmwater	Introduced
Fathead Minnow	Minnow	Warmwater	Native
Golden Shiner	Minnow	Warmwater	Introduced
Green Sunfish	Sunfish	Warmwater	Introduced
Largemouth Bass	Sunfish	Warmwater	Introduced
Longnose Dace	Minnow	Warmwater	Native
Longnose Sucker	Sucker	Warmwater	Native
Northern Pike	Pike	Warmwater	Introduced
Pumpkinseed	Sunfish	Warmwater	Introduced
Rock Bass	Sunfish	Warmwater	Introduced
Sauger	Perch	Warmwater	Native
Shorthead Redhorse	Sucker	Warmwater	Native
Smallmouth Bass	Sunfish	Warmwater	Introduced
Spottail Shiner	Minnow	Warmwater	Introduced
Stonecat	Catfish		Native
Walleye	Perch	Warmwater	Introduced
White Crappie	Sunfish	Warmwater	Introduced
White Sucker	Sucker	Warmwater	Native
Yellow Bullhead	Catfish	Warmwater	Introduced
Yellow Perch	Perch	Warmwater	Introduced
