= NPRC =

NPRC may refer to:

- National Personnel Records Center, an agency of the United States' National Archives and Records Administration
- National Provisional Ruling Council, the ruling junta of Sierra Leone between 1992 and 1996
- Northern Plains Resource Council, an American conservation organization
