= Meic =

Meic may refer to:

== People ==
- Meic Povey (1950–2017), Welsh screenwriter, director and actor
- Meic Stephens (1938–2018), Welsh literary editor, journalist, translator, and poet
- Meic Stevens (born 1942), Welsh singer-songwriter

== Other ==
- Meic Torcaill, a Norse-Gaelic family in mediaeval Dublin
- Montana Environmental Information Center
