= Powder Horn, Wyoming =

- Census-designated place
- Location within Wyoming Location within the United States
- Coordinates: 44°41′28″N 106°58′22″W
- Country: United States
- State: Wyoming
- County: Sheridan

Area
  - Total: 1.92 sq mi (4.96 km^{2})
  - Land: 1.92 sq mi (4.96 km^{2})
  - Water: 0 sq mi (0.0 km^{2})
- Elevation: 4,045 ft (1,233 m)

Population (2020)
  - Total: 682
- Time zone: UTC-7 (Mountain (MST))
  - Summer (DST): UTC-6 (MDT)
- ZIP Code: 82801 (Sheridan)
- Area code: 307
- FIPS code: 55-62269
- GNIS feature ID: 2807542

Powder Horn is a golf course community and census-designated place (CDP) in Sheridan County, Wyoming, United States. As of the 2020 census, it had a population of 682.

The community is in south-central Sheridan County, bordered to the southwest by Big Horn and 7 miles (11 km) south of Sheridan, the county seat. The community is in the valley of Little Goose Creek, which flows north to join Big Goose Creek in Sheridan, forming Goose Creek, which in turn is a north-flowing tributary of the Tongue River, leading to the Yellowstone River in Montana.
