= Toston Dam =

- Interactive map of Toston Dam
- Official name: Toston Dam
- Location: Broadwater County, Montana, U.S.
- Coordinates: 46°07′11″N 111°24′30″W
- Opening date: 1940
- Operator: Montana Department of Natural Resources and Conservation

Dam and spillways
- Impounds: Missouri River
- Height: 56 feet (17 m)
- Length: 705 feet (215 m)

Reservoir
- Creates: Toston Reservoir

Toston Dam is a hydroelectric gravity dam located on the Missouri River in Broadwater County, Montana. The dam is 705 feet (215 m) long and 56 feet (17 m) high, and generates 10 megawatts of power. The dam is a "run-of-the-river" dam because it can generate electricity without needing to store additional water supplies behind the dam.

== Construction ==
The dam is named after the town of Toston, Montana, which is just 6 miles (9.7 km) away. A $1.12 million dam was originally proposed in 1935. This project never was built. A smaller dam, whose construction would cost $900,000, was proposed in 1938, and the Montana State Water Conservation Board sought Public Works Administration funds to help construct the dam. This effort proved successful, and the federal agency gave the state $820,000 to build the dam. The project was the second-most-expensive hydro effort in the state at the time (only the Tongue River Dam, which cost $1.2 million, was larger).

The dam was built on a natural ridge of rock which ran perpendicular to the Missouri River on a point about 0.75 miles (1.21 km) above Big Spring. An inlet gate was built slightly upstream of the dam which connected to an underground 900 feet (270 m) pipeline that exited the ground downstream and connected to an irrigation canal running eastward. A ditch diverted water on the west down a canal for more irrigation purposes. About 3 miles (4.8 km) of Northern Pacific Railroad track was moved and raised to prevent it from being inundated by the Toston Reservoir.

The dam was completed 1940.

== Operation ==
Toston Dam is owned and operated by the Montana Department of Natural Resources and Conservation (DNRC). The dam includes inflatable Flashboards made of rubber at the crest of the dam, which can be used to raise the dam's height slightly (so that more water may be retained). Toston Reservoir, behind the dam, has a storage capacity of 3,000 acre-feet (3,700,000 m^{3}) of water. About 23,600 acres (9,600 ha) of land are irrigated by the dam.

Toston Dam originally did not generate power. But in 1979, the Montana state legislature passed a bill which would have allowed a state rural electrical cooperative to install generators at the dam. Governor Thomas Judge vetoed the bill, and the DNRC installed the generators instead. The agency's sole purpose was to generate revenues which it could then use to fund other projects throughout the state. Despite opposition, the agency went ahead in December 1982 with its $23 million plan to install a 10 megawatts (13,000 hp) generating plant. But the power plant did not go online until 1989.

Toston Dam generates approximately $900,000 a year in net revenues for the DNRC, which it uses to maintain other state-owned recreation, irrigation, and flood-control projects.

Major upgrades have occurred at Toston Dam in the past several years. A $26 million refurbishment in 1989 added the power plant, the inflatable flashboards, and improvements to maintenance and access roads. In 2002, the state spent $450,000 installing automatic "rakes" along the crest of the dam to clear debris. The rakes prevent damage to the dam, and helped to greatly reduce the number of times the power plant had to be shut down in order to clean the penstocks. In 2005, a bridge was built over the crest of the dam to give maintenance workers access to the dam face and to give the public access to the east side of the river.

== Conservation issues ==
Toston Dam is threatened with environmental degradation due to invasive species. In 2009, the Montana Department of Fish, Wildlife and Parks (FWP) warned that the reservoir had been invaded by northern pike which had escaped from private ponds upstream. Northern pike are an aggressive predatory fish which feed on trout and other species highly prized by fishermen. A year later, the state sought approval to remove the limit on daily catches of northern pike to protect several trout species, which had come under severe pressure from the pike. In April 2011, the pike problem became so severe that the FWP announced an even more aggressive plan to try to remove the predatory fish from Toston Reservoir and other upstream waters.

In 2010, FWP officials announced that non-native milfoil had invaded Toston Reservoir and Fort Peck Dam Reservoir. Milfoil is classified by the state of Montana as a Priority 1B noxious weed, one of the highest priority invasive species.

== Bibliography ==
- Water Projects Bureau. "Toston Dam (Broadwater-Missouri). Fact Sheet." Water Resources Division. Montana Department of Natural Resources and Conservation. No date.
