= Big Goose Creek =

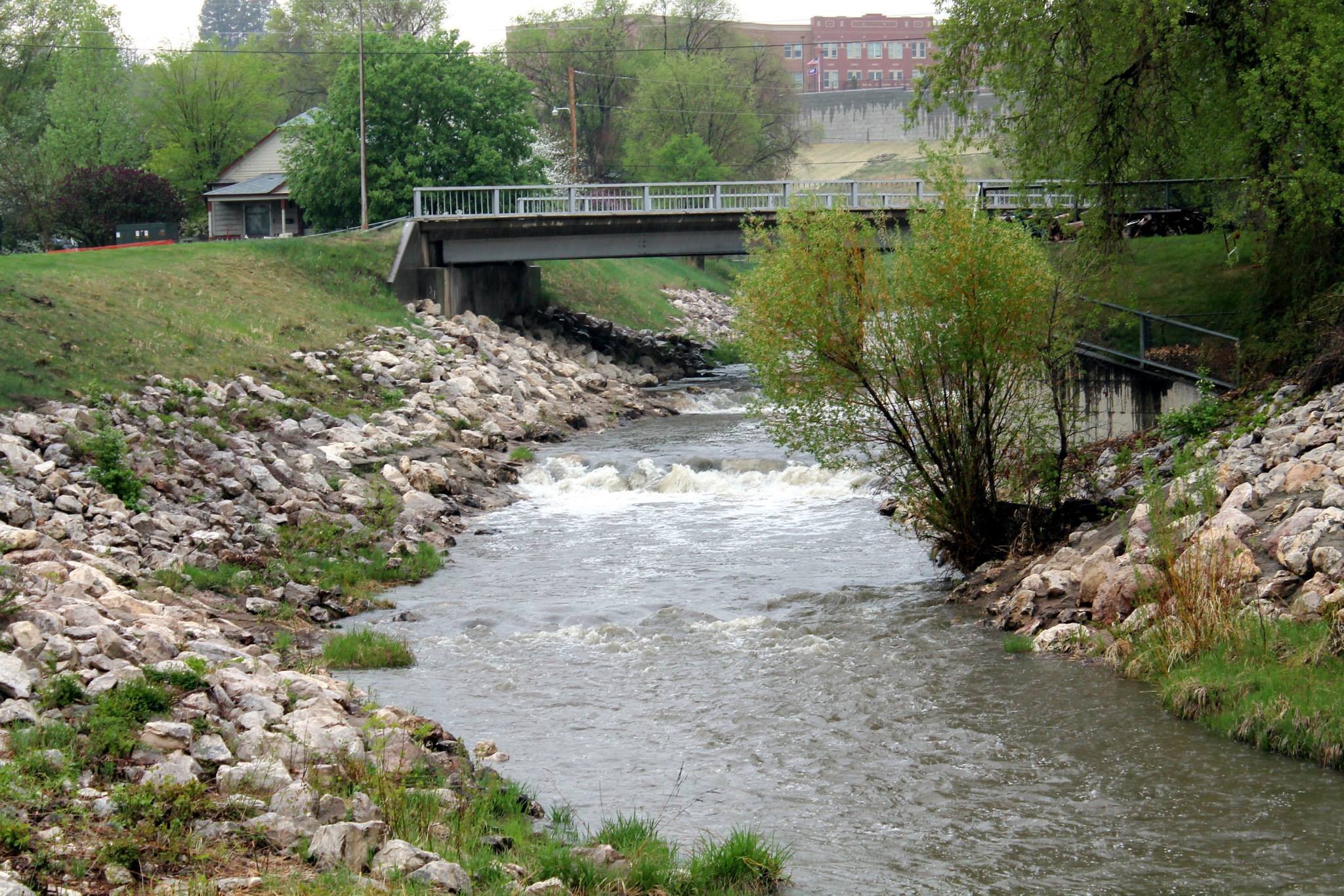
- Big Goose Creek flowing through Sheridan, Wyoming

Location
- Country: United States
- State: Wyoming
- County: Sheridan
- City: Sheridan

Physical characteristics
- Source
  - location: Bighorn Mountains
- Mouth
  - location: Tongue River
  - coordinates: 44°51′22″N 106°57′08″W

Basin features
- Progression: Tongue River → Yellowstone River → Missouri River → Mississippi River

Big Goose Creek is a significant waterway in Sheridan County, Wyoming. The creek originates from Park Reservoir, southwest of Sheridan in the Bighorn Mountains. It flows northeasterly through canyons on the east face of the mountains before eventually reaching the Powder River Basin. The creek is the primary water source for Sheridan and the surrounding communities. In the town of Sheridan, it joins "Little Goose Creek" near Dow and Val Vista Street.

The creek’s upper reaches cut through Precambrian basement rock, consisting primarily of quartz monzonite and gneiss. Once it reaches the canyons of the Bighorns, it flows through Bighorn Dolomite and the fossil-rich Madison Limestone. Once across the Bighorn Fault, the creek enters the Powder River Basin, where the gradient decreases and the stream begins to meander through the Eocene-aged Wasatch Formation.

== Origin ==
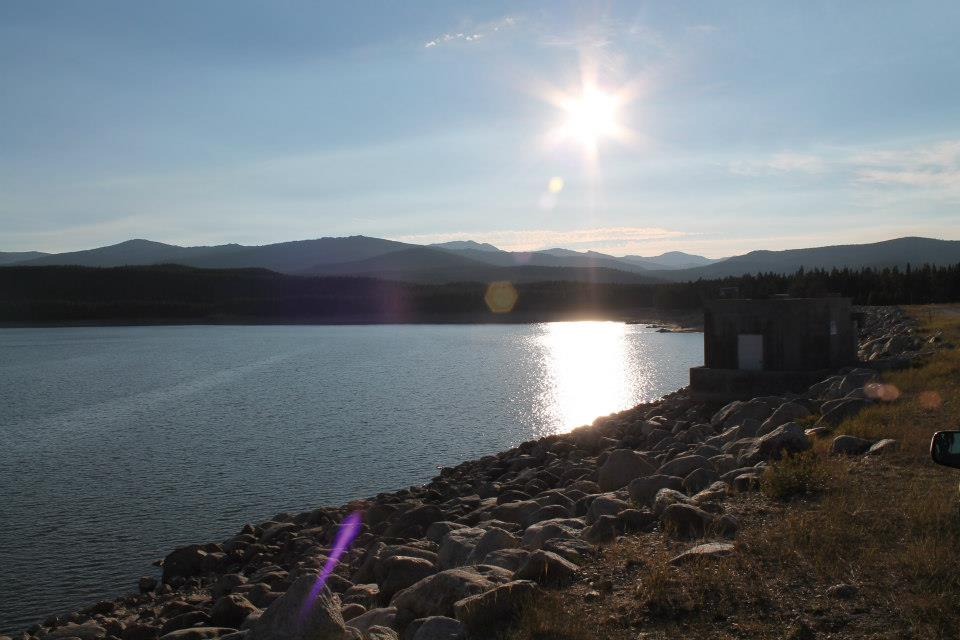
Park Reservoir in the Big Horn Mountains, Wyoming, USA

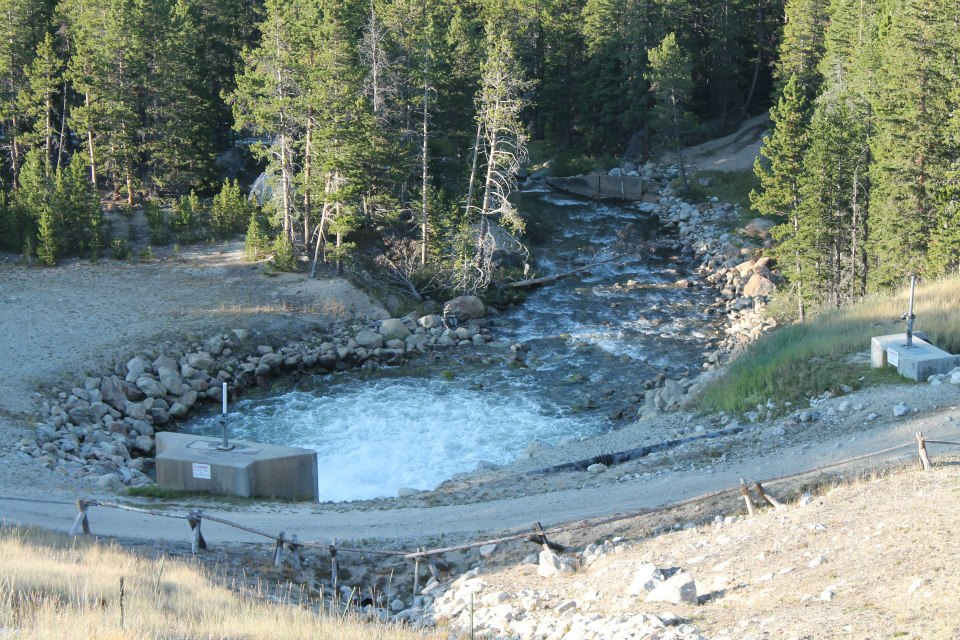
The origin of Big Goose Creek at Park Reservoir in the Big Horn Mountains

The reservoir that supplies Big Goose is filled as a result of snow-melt, typically beginning in mid to late May. The creek is also fed via Dome Lake. Park Reservoir was created in the early 20th century.

After joining Little Goose Creek in the Sherian city limits, the creek becomes known as "Goose Creek," which eventually empties into the Tongue River.

The city of Sheridan has implemented a watershed control program plan to protect the upper part of the creek, which serves as the city's primary water supply. It identifies potential contaminants in the creek, including Cryptosporidium. The goal is to stop the pollutants before they reach the water treatment plant. The city has made significant updates to its treatment facilities to meet EPA standards.

The creek is known to contain brook trout, and rainbow trout. There city has also created projects to allow for Yellowstone cutthroat trout to thrive. Focus has also been put on other wildlife native to the region.

Big Goose is also a part of Sheridan's pathways project, and much of the creek is walkable within the city limits.

== Floods ==
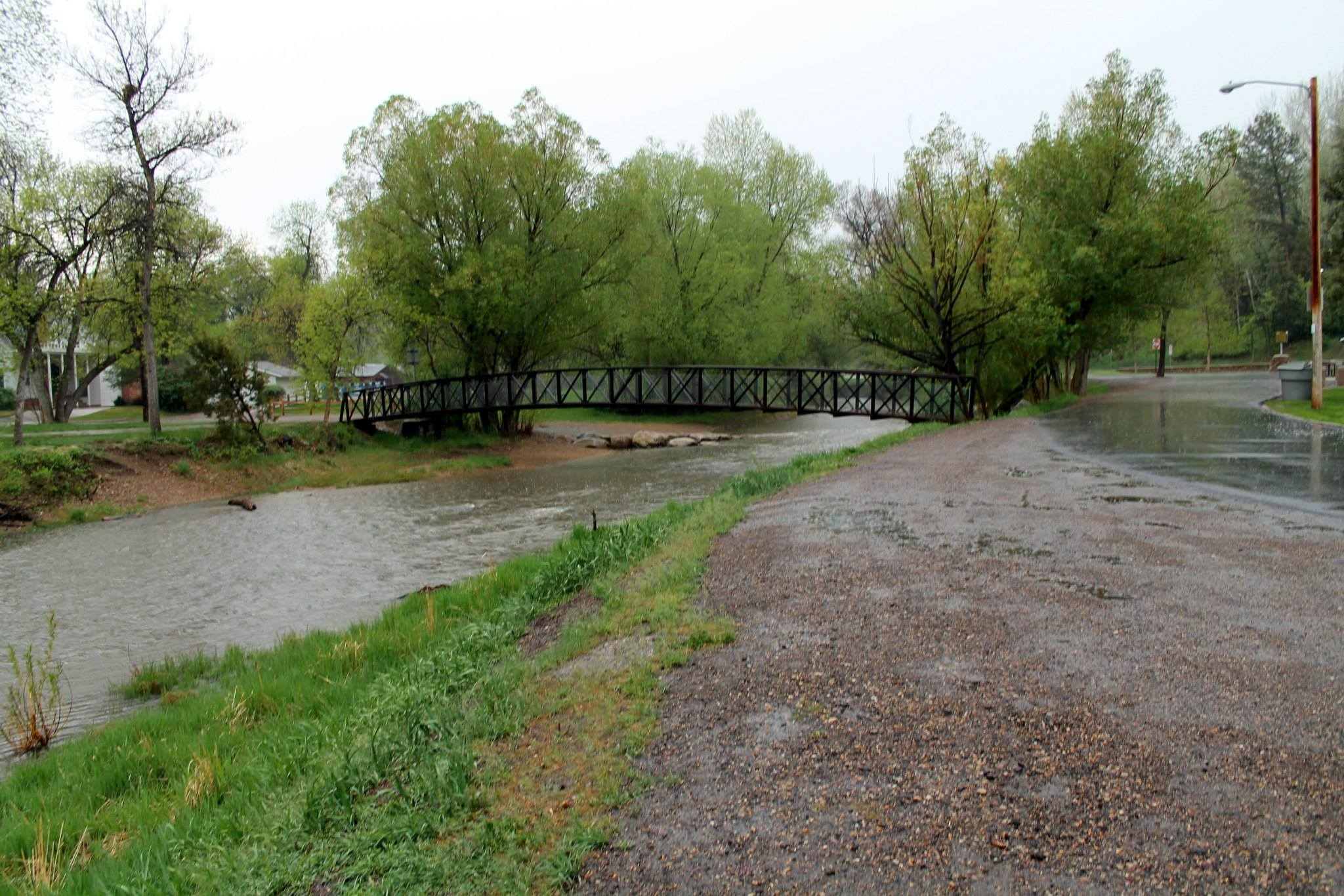
A bridge crossing over Big Goose Creek near Kendrick Park in Sheridan, Wyoming

Big Goose Creek is prone to flooding, and its level depends on the yearly snowpack. The most significant flood occurred in 1923. That flood impacted businesses and destroyed bridges, causing millions of dollars in damage. The city of Sheridan began to consider flood control and levees. In June 1963, heavy rainfall combined with peak snowmelt caused the creek to breach its banks once again, leading to the inundation of residential areas and the loss of livestock in the lower valley. In response to these recurring disasters, the United States Army Corps of Engineers collaborated with local authorities to construct an extensive system of levees and concrete floodways through the city.
