= Tongue River Railroad =

The Tongue River Railroad was a proposed rail line in Southern Montana that would connect the region around Ashland, Montana with a BNSF Railway line to the north; over the project's lifespan, various routings were studied. The project was first proposed in the 1980s, but never moved out of the development and planning stages.

== Early attempts 1981-1998 ==
The first incarnation of the Tongue River Railroad began in 1981, when three companies, DS Cartage Corporation, Otter Creek Transportation Company, and Transportation Properties Inc., a Washington Energy Company subsidiary, formed a consortium to build a roughly 80 miles (130 km) railroad from Miles City, Montana, where it would connect with the Burlington Northern Railroad, to Ashland, where Billings, Montana-based coal company Montco planned to build a large surface coal mine. The plan was approved in 1986 by the Interstate Commerce Commission, but never built.

As a result of lower coal prices in the late 1980s, plans for the railroad were tabled. However, as the implementation of the Clean Air Act required coal burning power plants to use low-sulfur coal of the kind in southern Montana, a revived proposal for a 177 miles (285 km) route, estimated to cost about $117 million, emerged in the early 1990s, led by developer Mike Gustafson. The Surface Transportation Board (STB) approved that route, from Miles City to Birney, Montana, in 1996.

== 2007 to present ==
The railroad was still not built, however, and by 2007 a third route had emerged, which would terminate the line at Decker, Montana, where an existing BNSF line moved trains south onto a circuitous routing to Miles City. This 130 miles (210 km) alignment allowed the Tongue River line to serve both existing coal traffic as well as new mines along the route. In October 2007, the STB approved the routing and granted approval to begin construction on an initial 17 miles (27 km) section of track on the southern end of the route. The planned construction was halted two years later, however, when in July 2009 the Montana Department of Fish and Wildlife rejected Tongue River's request for an easement to build through a fish hatchery.

In March 2010, the state of Montana agreed to lease the Otter Creek coal tracts to Arch Coal, allowing the project, now on a 106 miles (171 km) routing, to again move forward. In July 2011, plans again changed when rights to the project were purchased from developer Gustofson by Arch Coal, BNSF, and Forrest Mars, ex-CEO of Mars, Inc. With the ownership change, the route was once again cut back to Ashland, to avoid going through Mars' personal ranch near Birney.

In late December 2011, the 9th Circuit Court of Appeals ordered the STB to conduct a new environmental impact statement for the Tongue River line, as well as review construction permits for two parts of the route. The ruling came after a coalition made up of the Northern Plains Resource Council, the city of Forsyth, Montana, the United Transportation Union, and private individual Mark Fix challenged the STB's earlier approval of the route.

As part of the STB's review, the board in June 2012 required the Tongue River Railroad to file a new application, in light of changing plans and routes since the 2007 approval. In December 2012, Tongue River Railroad issued a new application for a shorter 42 miles (68 km) line between Ashland and the BNSF line at Colstrip, Montana, instead of Miles City. According to the railroad, the route had been considered in the past, but rejected due to steep grades; however, advances in distributed power on trains had made it feasible. The new alignment was estimated to cost $416 million, as opposed to $490 million for the Miles City route.

The STB's latest environmental impact study was originally expected to be completed in 2013, but was delayed until April 2015, when the board released the draft EIS for public comment before it issues a final decision. The board studied both the proposed route, as well as five alternatives, which would transport an estimated 20 million tons of coal annually on 26 trains each way per week.

In November 2015, Tongue River Railroad "submitted a request [to the STB] to suspend the permitting process," according to a BNSF spokesperson, who cited delays in state approval of constructing a coal mine in the Otter Creek tracts. Originally expected to begin production in 2017, the Otter Creek mine was denied a permit in March 2015 by the Montana Department of Environmental Quality, which said that Arch Coal's application at the time contained hundreds of flaws. The STB finally rejected the request in April 2016, citing the bankruptcy of Arch Coal.
