= Park Reservoir (Wyoming) =

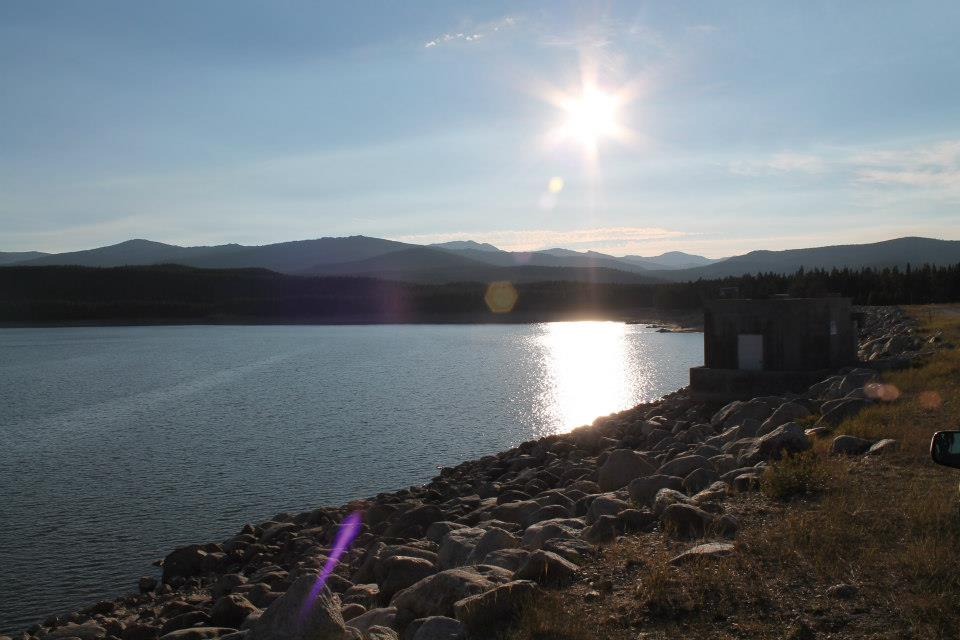
- Interactive map of Park Reservoir
- Location: Sheridan / Johnson counties, Wyoming
- Coordinates: 44°34′00″N 107°12′49″W
- Type: Reservoir
- Primary inflows: East Fork Big Goose Creek
- Primary outflows: East Fork Big Goose Creek
- Basin countries: United States
- Surface elevation: 8,268 ft (2,520 m)
- Frozen: November–May

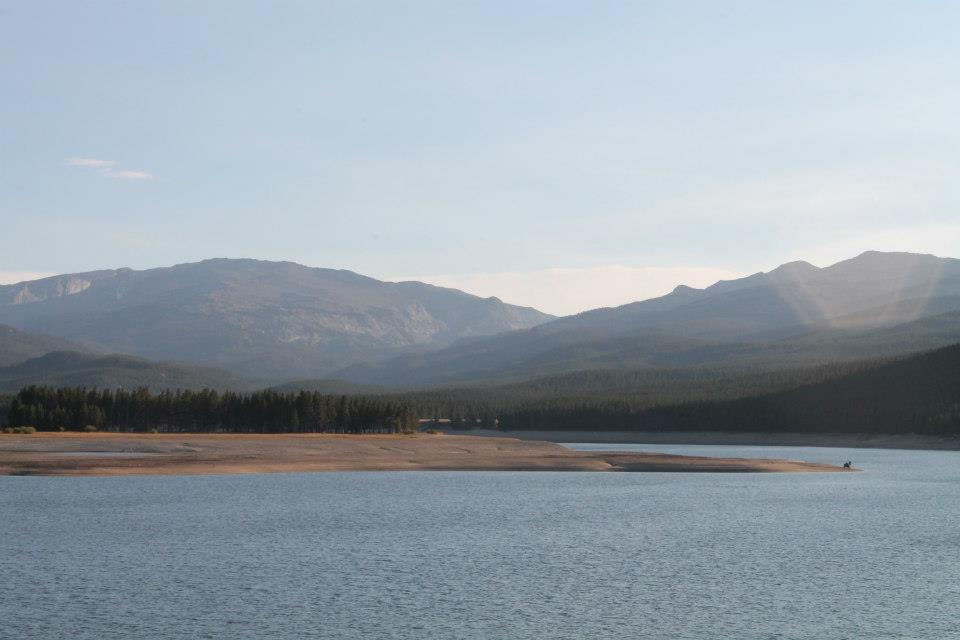
Looking south over Park Reservoir.

Park Reservoir is a high-altitude lake tucked away in the Bighorn Mountains of northern Wyoming. It sits at an elevation of roughly 8,268 feet (2,520 m) within the Bighorn National Forest. The reservoir is primarily used for irrigation, storage, and recreation. Park Reservoir feeds Big Goose Creek, which is the town of Sheridan, Wyoming's primary water supply. The reservoir is located roughly 20 miles south of Sheridan, straddling the boundary between Sheridan and Johnson counties. Access is primarily via Red Grade Road (State Highway 26), a steep, unpaved route that originates near the town of Big Horn. The reservoir has a capacity of 12,500 acre-feet.

== Recreation and Dam ==
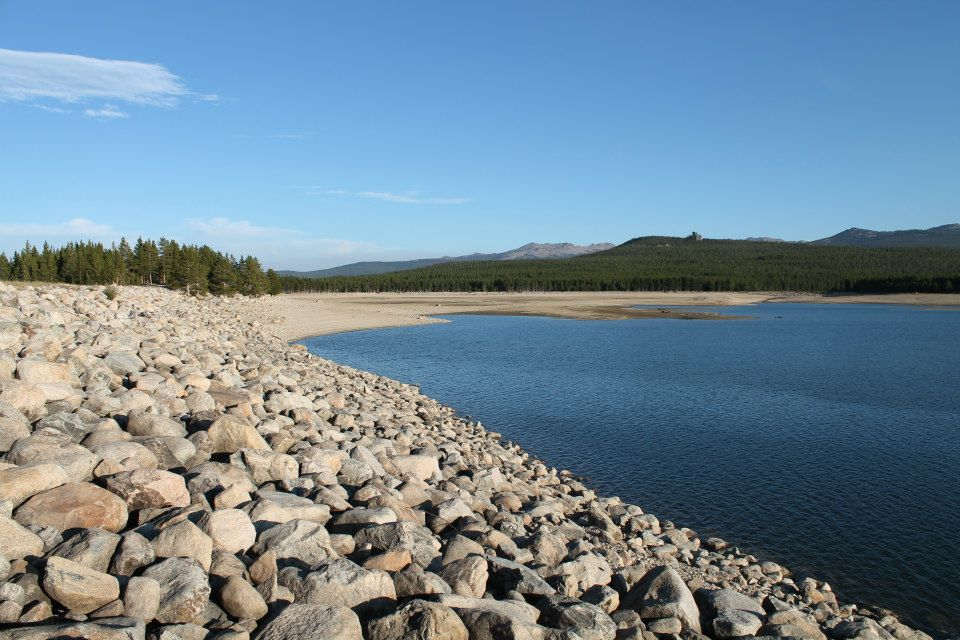
The rocky dam of Park Reservoir in the Bighorns

Because Park Reservoir is a source of drinking water and irrigation, boating on the lake involves non-motorized craft. There are several developed campgrounds nearby, including Big Goose Campground, and others managed by the Forest Service. Park Reservoir is fed via snowmelt, and as such, its level varies depending on snowpack. Water storage structures were built in the late 1930s using the Civilian Conservation Corps. In 1977, the Wyoming Legislature provided state assistance for the reconstruction and repair of the Park Reservoir Dam, officially recognizing it as a project of public benefit. The City of Sheridan, through SAWS (Sheridan Area Water Supply) utilizes water from Park Reservoir, and the level is managed during times of drought.

== Geology ==
The area is characterized geologically by Precambrian bedrock within the Bighorn batholith, some of the oldest exposed rocks in northeastern Wyoming. They have been dated to 2.9 million years old.

== Wildlife ==
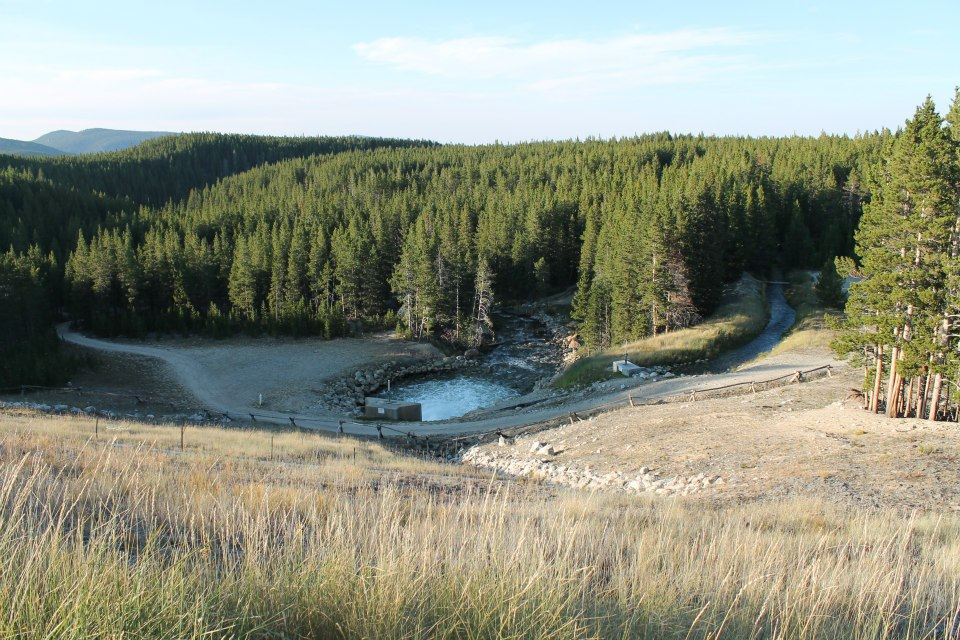
Big Goose Creek outflow from Park Reservoir

The Wyoming Game and Fish Department uses fish from the Story Fish Hatchery to stock Park Reservoir. Rainbow, brown, and brook trout can be caught. Moose and Elk are frequently spotted near the lake, along with Mule deer. Black bears and mountain lions have also been spotted, and the Forest Service encourages using safe practices. The water attracts various waterfowl, while the surrounding timber provides nesting grounds for raptors and gray jays.

== Access ==
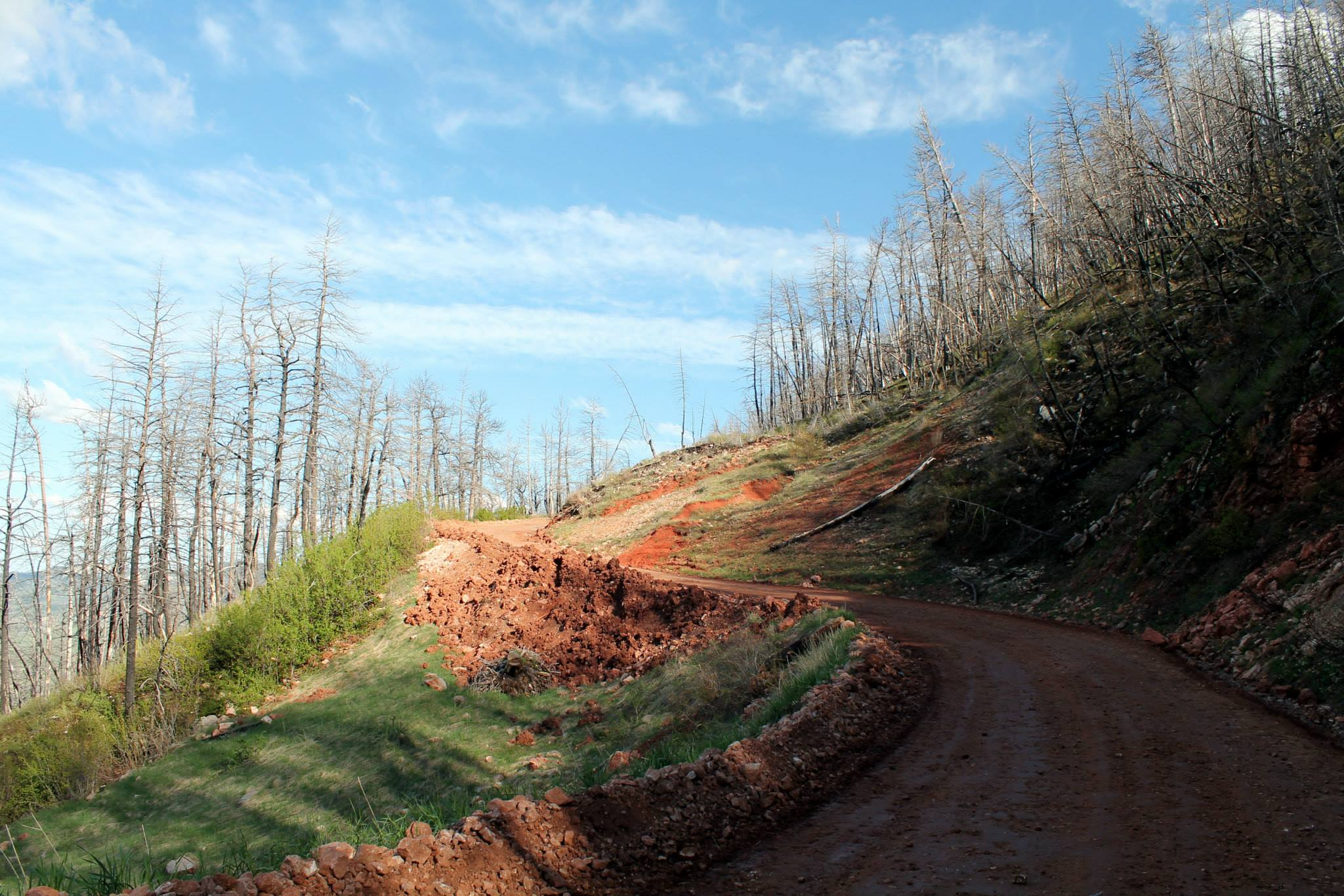
Red Grade Road southwest of Sheridan, Wyoming

Park Reservoir is primarily accessed from the east via Red Grade Road, a steep, unpaved road that originates outside of Bighorn. Originally, the route was scouted in the 1890s as a way to establish a mail and freight link between the eastern and western sides of the Bighorns. In March 1894, government scouts Frank Grouard and Shorty Wheelwright were commissioned to find a practicable path over the mountains in mid-winter conditions. The construction of the wagon road followed from 1893 to 1897, funded by Sheridan County and local subscriptions. Red Grade became a vital artery for logging, particularly for the McShane lumber camp and the early mountain resorts like the Dome Lake Club.
