= North and South Railway =

Former railroad in Wyoming and Montana

Overview
- Locale: Wyoming
- Dates of operation: 1923–1935

Technical
- Track gauge: 4 ft 8 1/2 in (1,435 mm) standard gauge

The North and South Railway (N&S), now defunct, was an American railroad planned for construction between Casper, Wyoming and Miles City, Montana, via Sheridan, Wyoming. Though substantial portions of the railroad's grade were completed in 1923, only the far southern end of the line was ever completed, and that trackage was abandoned in 1935.

== History ==
Charles N. Haskell (1860-1933), promoter of the North and South Railway.

During the first years of the twentieth century, residents of north-central Wyoming and south-central Montana advanced multiple proposals for the construction of a new railway line between Sheridan and Miles City. The proposed route, which generally followed the course of the Tongue River, would access the vast and remote ranching country between the two towns and would provide Sheridan with a second railway outlet to the east. (The city was already served by a mainline of the Chicago, Burlington and Quincy Railroad.)

The N&S line to Salt Creek operated only until 1935 when it was abandoned. Substantial evidence of the old railroad grade remains visible today, in both Wyoming and Montana.

The never-completed alignment of the N&S in Montana continues to receive attention as a possible rail corridor today – this time by the Tongue River Railroad, a proposed coal-hauling line between the Decker, Montana area and Miles City.
