= Little Goose Creek =

Coordinates: 44°48′11″N 106°57′29″W

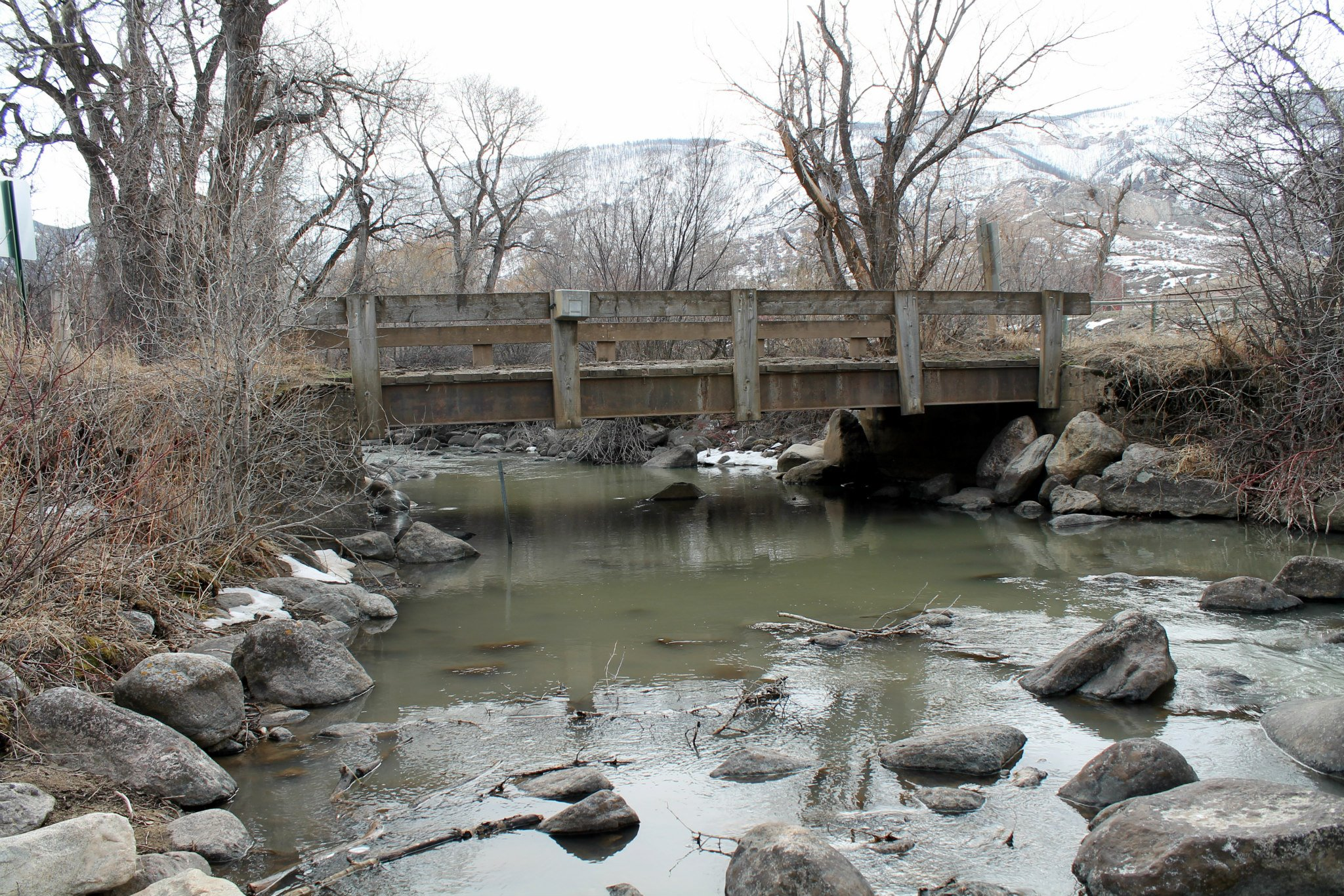
- Little Goose Creek, near the Big Horn Mountains

Location
- Country: United States
- State: Wyoming
- County: Sheridan

Physical characteristics
- Source: Bighorn National Forest
  - location: Bighorn Mountains, Wyoming
- Mouth: Big Goose Creek
  - location: Sheridan, Wyoming

Basin features
- Progression: Big Goose Creek → Tongue River → Yellowstone River → Missouri River → Mississippi River
- Bridges: East Works Street Bridge (Replacement scheduled 2025–2026)

Little Goose Creek is a creek originating on the east slope of the Big Horn Mountains in north-central Wyoming.

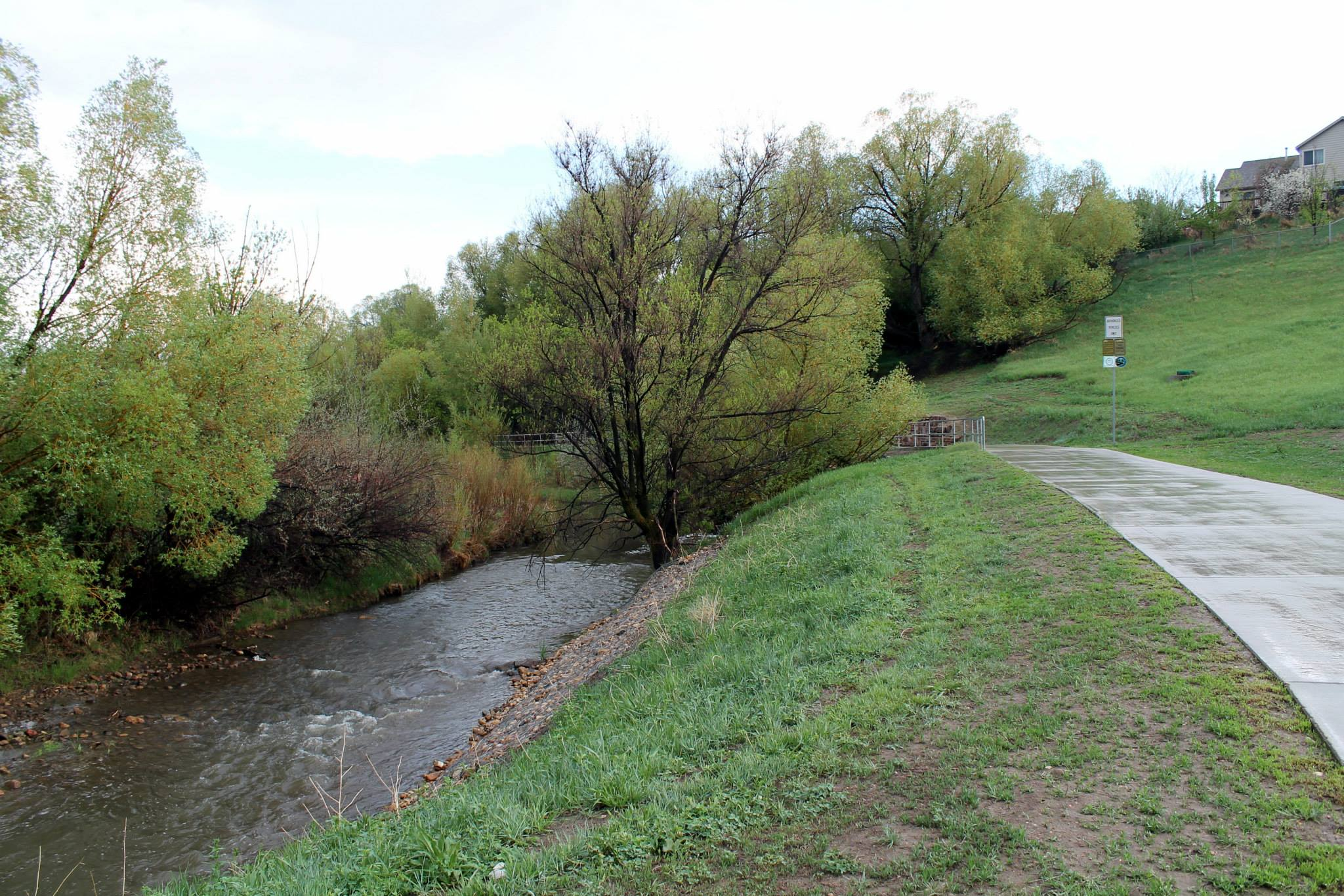
Little Goose Creek next to a pathway, which leads to South Park in Sheridan, Wyoming

== Route ==
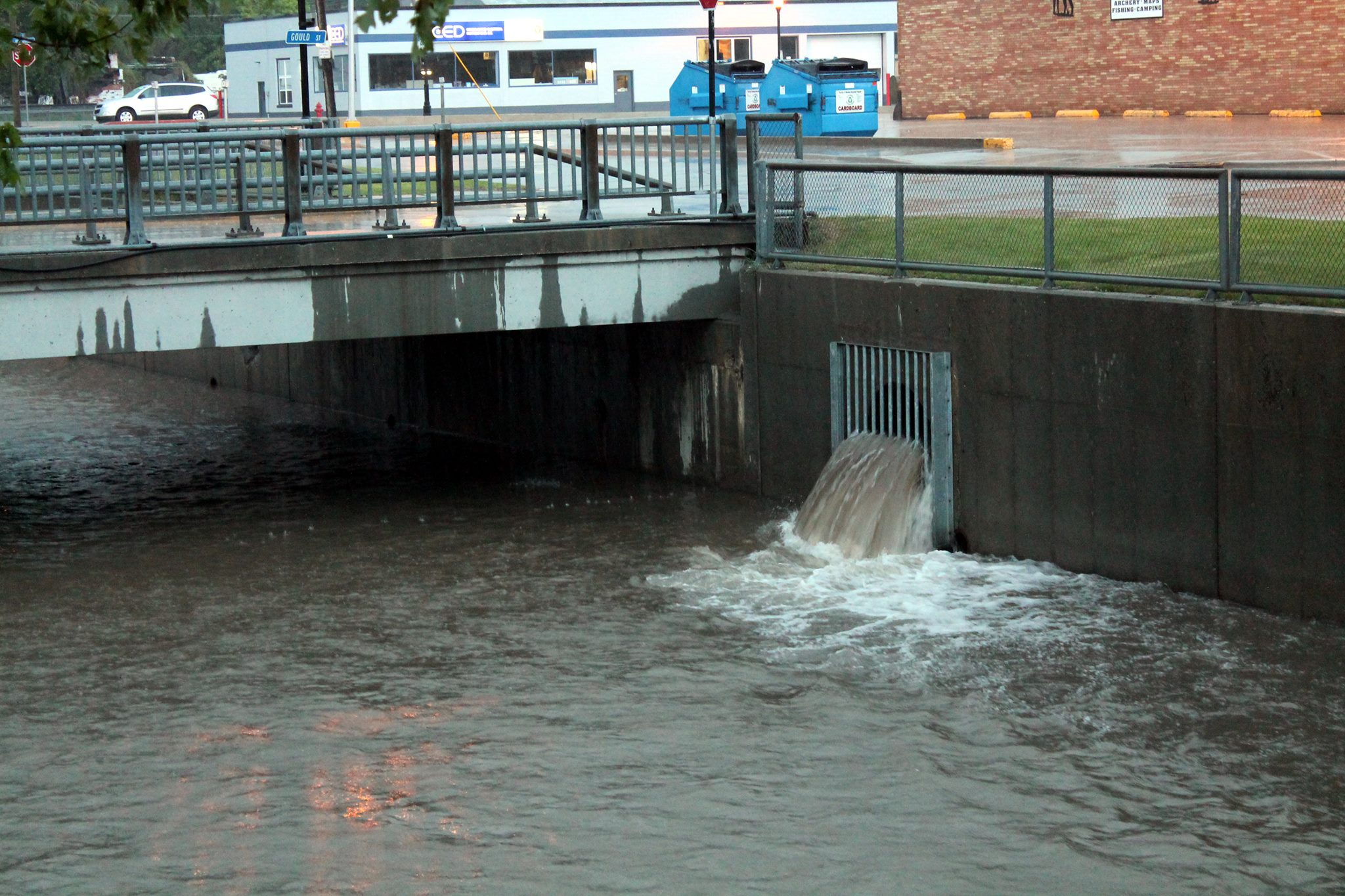
Little Goose Creek flood control in Sheridan

After dropping over 4,000 feet (1,200 m) and entering a steep canyon, the creek flows out of the Big Horn Mountains and into the Powder River Basin. Passing by the Bradford Brinton Memorial Museum and Art Gallery, the creek flows through Lions Park in Big Horn, Wyoming. Several miles downstream, the creek flows through the Powder Horn Golf Course. Upon entering the town of Sheridan, Little Goose Creek enters a channel built by the Corps of Engineers in the 1940s.

Following the channel, the stream meets Big Goose Creek at Mill Park near the Sheridan County Fulmer Public Library, and becomes Goose Creek, which flows 10 miles (16 km) and empties into the Tongue River, north of Sheridan. The creek is part of the larger Yellowstone River Basin. Its flow is heavily influenced by mountain snowpack melt, typically peaking in late spring.

The creek was a primary factor in the location and development of the town of Sheridan. In the late 19th century, the fertile valley provided essential water for early homesteaders and the burgeoning agricultural industry. The "Goose Creek Valley" became a hub for cattle ranching and flour milling, with the water powering early local industries.

Little Goose Creek plays a part in Sheridan's water supply. As with Big Goose Creek, portions of the creek are part of the Sheridan pathway system.

In July 2025, the city and the United States Army Corps of Engineers celebrated the completion of the first phase of a major restoration project under the Section 1135 authority. This work focused on reversing the damage caused by the 1960s flood control system, which had straightened the creek and encased sections in concrete.

Modified drop structures were installed at Mill Park to reduce vertical drops to 0.4 feet, allowing native fish, including the Yellowstone cutthroat trout, to migrate upstream for the first time in decades. Plans involve widening the channel and restoring natural "oxbows" to reconnect the creek with its historic floodplain. To accommodate a more natural stream flow while maintaining flood protection, the city is slated to replace the East Works Street bridge in 2025/2026 as part of broader downtown utility and structural upgrades.
