= Northern Plains Resource Council =

US conservation organization

- Abbreviation: NPRC
- Formation: April 27, 1972; 52 years ago
- Type: Nonprofit
- Tax ID no.: 81-0367205
- Legal status: 501(c)(3)
- Headquarters: Billings, Montana
- Board Chair: Joanie Kresich
- Executive Director: Maggie Gordon
- Website: https://northernplains.org/

The Northern Plains Resource Council (NPRC) is an American grassroots conservation and family agriculture group. The organization was established in 1972 by ranchers in Montana who united in opposition to coal industry efforts to strip mine in the Powder River Basin.

== Background ==
The Fort Union Formation, situated largely under the Powder River Basin, is the richest known coal deposit in the world, with 100 billion tons of coal recoverable by strip mining. In October 1971, one year after the passage of the Clean Water Act, the North Central Power Study was published. The study was written jointly by 35 utilities from Oregon to Illinois along with the United States Bureau of Reclamation. It called for the exploitation of coal reserves west of the Mississippi River and included plans for strip mining and power generation.

== History ==
The Northern Plains Resource Council was formed on April 27, 1972 with the goal of providing a "unified, more powerful counterforce in public 'discussions' with the users of non-renewable resources (minerals), particularly including the coal strip-miners." The foundation was spearheaded by the Rosebud Protective Association and the Bull Mountain Landowners Association with the assistance of environmentalists from the Montana Wildlife Federation and the Sierra Club.

== Northern Plains programs ==
As of 2020, Northern Plains has member task forces that address issues in the following areas:

- Coal
- Oil and Gas
- Keystone XL Pipeline
- Agriculture
- Soil
- Clean Energy
- The Good Neighbor Agreement with the Stillwater Mining Company

== Organizational structure ==
Northern Plains is governed by a Board of Directors, composed of delegates representing its affiliate groups, along with at-large delegates and officers elected annually by the membership.

Northern Plains includes 13 affiliate groups in 10 Montana counties. They include:

- Bear Creek Council (Gardiner area)
- Beartooth Alliance (Cooke City area)
- Bull Mountain Land Alliance (Shepherd area)
- Carbon County Resource Council (Red Lodge area)
- Central Montana Resource Council (Lewistown area)
- Cottonwood Resource Council (Big Timber area)
- Dawson Resource Council (Glendive area)
- McCone Agricultural Protection Organization (Circle area)
- Rosebud Protective Association (Colstrip area)
- Sleeping Giant Citizens Council (Helena area)
- Stillwater Protective Association (Stillwater area)
- Yellowstone Bend Citizens Council (Livingston area)
- Yellowstone Valley Citizens Council (Billings area)

In 1979, Northern Plains co-founded the Western Organization of Resource Councils, a regional network of community organizations that now has member groups in seven Western states.
