= Montana Environmental Information Center =

Environmental nonprofit organization

- Formation: January 1, 1973; 53 years ago
- Type: Nonprofit
- Tax ID no.: 23-7337100
- Legal status: 501(c)(3)
- Headquarters: Helena Montana, USA
- Board President: Kathy Juedeman
- Executive Director: Cari Kimball
- Budget: $380,566 (2015)
- Website: https://meic.org/

The Montana Environmental Information Center is an environmental organization in the United States. It was founded in 1973 by Montanans to protect and restore Montana's natural environment. It functions as a non-profit environmental advocacy group.

== History ==
The MEIC was established in 1973.

In 2016 the MEIC has taken action with the Sierra Club and sued the Colstrip Montana plant owners over permit violations and secured an agreement with Talen Energy to close Plants 1 & 2 in Colstrip by 2022. MEIC has also taken legal action with Sierra Club to stop expansion of the Rosebud Mine at Costrip.
