= Colstrip, Montana =

- City
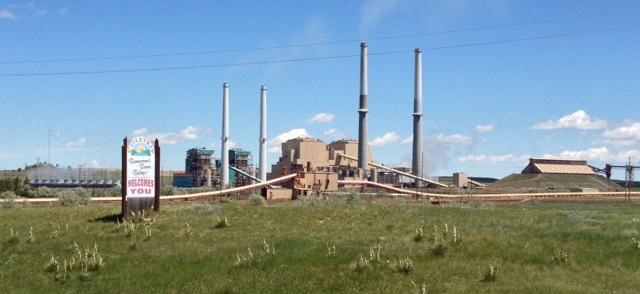
- Sign upon entering Colstrip

- Seal
- Motto: Tomorrow's Town Today
- Location of Colstrip, Montana
- Coordinates: 45°53′03″N 106°37′25″W
- Country: United States
- State: Montana
- County: Rosebud
- Incorporated (city): 1998

Government
  - Type: Mayor-Council
  - Mayor: John Williams

Area
  - Total: 4.05 sq mi (10.49 km^{2})
  - Land: 4.05 sq mi (10.48 km^{2})
  - Water: 0.0077 sq mi (0.02 km^{2})
- Elevation: 3,202 ft (976 m)

Population (2020)
  - Total: 2,096
  - Density: 518.1/sq mi (200.04/km^{2})
- Time zone: UTC-7 (Mountain (MST))
  - Summer (DST): UTC-6 (MDT)
- ZIP code: 59323
- Area code: 406
- FIPS code: 30-16525
- GNIS feature ID: 2410199
- Website: www.cityofcolstrip.com

Colstrip is a city in Rosebud County, Montana, United States. The population was 2,096 at the 2020 census.

Established in 1924 and incorporated as a city in 1998, Colstrip is the largest city in Rosebud County, with 25.2% of the total population in 2020. Colstrip's primary industries are coal mining and electricity production. It had 4 coal-fired plants from 1975 and 1976, and 1984 and 1986 respectively. The former two were shut down in 2020, while the latter two are still operating without modern pollution controls. As of 2025, these are the most particulate matter polluting plants in the US.

== History ==
=== 20th century ===
Open pit strip mining with shovels at Colstrip's Rosebud Mine

Colstrip was established by the Northern Pacific Railway in 1924 as a company town to provide coal for their steam locomotives. The mining at Rosebud Mine, two miles south of the town, is open pit strip mining, where draglines remove soil above the layer of bituminous coal from the Fort Union Formation.

During The Second World War, the Colstrip mine was identified as strategically important because it supplied coal for the Northern Pacific Railway steam locomotives hauling military equipment for the war effort. The mine was guarded from sabotage, and the employees were not allowed to quit their jobs.

In 1958, the railroad switched to using diesel locomotives and the Colstrip mine was shut down.

In 1959, Montana Power Company purchased the rights to the mine and the town. It resumed mining operations in the 1970s, with plans to build coal-fired electrical plants. The Rosebud Mine opened in 1968.

The power plants were built in the 1970s and 1980s by a collection of contractors including Bechtel. During this construction period, Colstrip was a boomtown, with a large increase in population. Plants 1 and 2 became operational in 1975 and 1976, and plants 3 and 4 became operational in 1984 and 1986.

Colstrip Power Plants 1-4 from right to left

In 1974, construction of Colstrip's 150-acre (0.61 km^{2}) Castle Rock Lake (formerly called a surge pond) was completed.

The Colstrip plants produce electricity from coal using steam. The water for the steam is pumped in an underground pipe 30 miles (48 km) from the Yellowstone River and stored in the lake. The lake is stocked with fish and is the home for a wide variety of wildlife.

In 1990, the Colstrip Energy Limited Project began commercial operations. Located six miles (10 km) north of Colstrip, this experimental electricity production facility is owned by Rosebud Energy Corp., a partnership that at one point included Enron. The plant uses high sulfur waste coal from the Rosebud Coal Mine's topmost one foot layer of coal.

In 1998, plants 1-4 were sold to a group led by PPL Corporation (PPL) and Puget Sound Energy (PSE). The Rosebud Coal Mine was sold to Westmoreland Mining LLC. In this same year, the City of Colstrip was incorporated.

=== 21st century ===
In June 2015, PPL spun off its power generation assets, including the Colstrip plants, to become Talen Energy.

In 2016, PSE reached an agreement with the Sierra Club and the Montana Environmental Information Center to shut down units 1 and 2 of the coal-fired generating plant by the year 2022. The agreement said nothing about Units 3 and 4 However, the existing electrical transmission capacity that transmits power from Colstrip to the Pacific Northwest may be used to transmit wind energy. Another blow to Colstrip's economy came in 2016, when an application to create a junction point from BNSF Railway to connect to Tongue River Railroad was denied.

In June 2019, Talen Energy announced the closure of two of the four coal burning units by the end of the year. At the time, the power plant was the sixth-largest source of greenhouse emissions in the U.S. Units 3 and 4 remained in operation.

In January 2020, PSE announced that Unit 1 and Unit 2 had ceased operating in early January". Units 3 and 4 were to remain operational but would be closed within the next five years.

In January 2023, Avista made a deal giving NorthWestern Energy their 15% share of the plant for free. The deal was to take effect in 2025. A Washington state law bans use of coal-generated electricity, forcing Avista to relinquish their stake in the company.

In March 2025, the plant owner, backed by Montana politicians, asked for a two-year extension using the second Trump administration's offer to grant presidential pollution waivers. The plant owners argued that continued operation would control energy costs and guarantee grid reliability.

== Geography ==
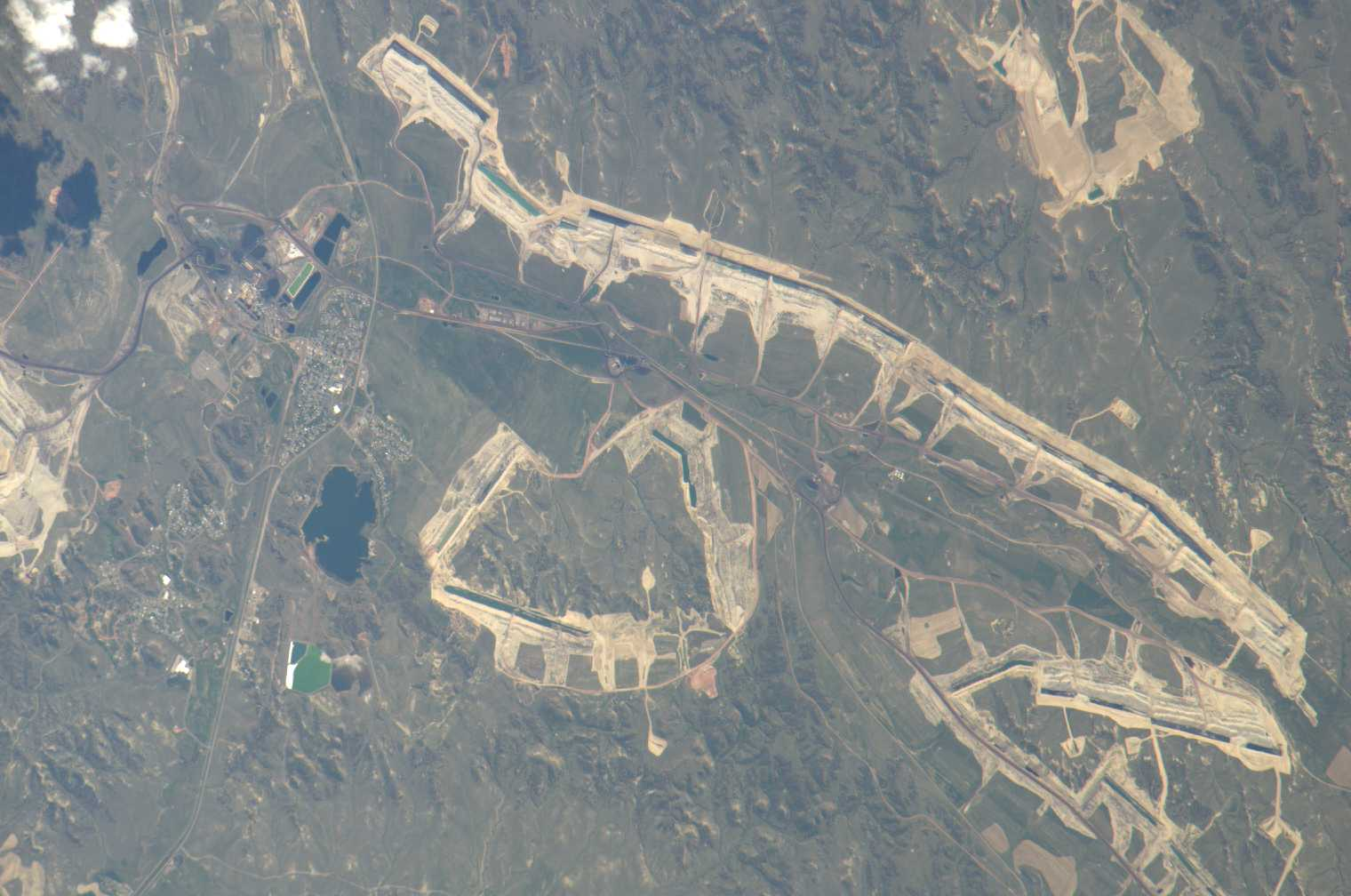
The Rosebud mine in 2006, taken from the International Space Station

The Powder River Basin contains the 25,000-acre Rosebud Mine, a strip mine a few miles south of Colstrip, and the Northern Cheyenne Indian Reservation. Bituminous coal lies in the Fort Union Formation.

According to the United States Census Bureau, the city has a total area of 4.47 square miles (11.58 km^{2}), all land.

There are 30 city parks and 300 acres of green space owned by the city.

South of town 23 miles (37 km), is Deer Medicine Rocks, a National Historic Landmark. These sandstone cliffs are covered with petroglyphs and pictographs. Hills covered in sandstone formations are typical of this area. The topography in the county is mostly rolling with small hills. Deer and pronghorn are plentiful.

== Economy ==
As of 2017, the majority of jobs in the city were in local and federal governments, employing 1,732 people.

The Rosebud mine produces 6-8 million tons of coal per year and employed 373 people as of 2017, while the Colstrip power plant employed 383 people. The Rosebud power plant, a municipal power plant fueled by high sulfur waste coal, employed 42 people.

Environmental remediation of the 2 closed energy units, particularly groundwater contamination from seepage and leakage of the effluent ponds, is costly. In 2017, it was calculated as ranging from $85 million to $143 million. With planning for decommissioning obscured from public view, there has been uncertainty for the community.

== Climate ==
According to the Köppen Climate Classification system, Colstrip has a semi-arid climate, abbreviated "BSk" on climate maps.

Climate data for Colstrip, Montana, 1991–2020 normals, extremes 1927–present
Month	Jan	Feb	Mar	Apr	May	Jun	Jul	Aug	Sep	Oct	Nov	Dec	Year
Record high °F (°C)	69 (21)	72 (22)	81 (27)	90 (32)	99 (37)	108 (42)	110 (43)	111 (44)	102 (39)	94 (34)	80 (27)	74 (23)	111 (44)
Mean maximum °F (°C)	57.0 (13.9)	58.9 (14.9)	69.5 (20.8)	77.6 (25.3)	83.4 (28.6)	92.0 (33.3)	98.2 (36.8)	97.2 (36.2)	93.3 (34.1)	81.5 (27.5)	67.8 (19.9)	57.3 (14.1)	99.8 (37.7)
Mean daily maximum °F (°C)	35.8 (2.1)	37.1 (2.8)	47.1 (8.4)	55.4 (13.0)	64.9 (18.3)	74.9 (23.8)	85.0 (29.4)	84.0 (28.9)	76.4 (24.7)	58.1 (14.5)	45.9 (7.7)	36.6 (2.6)	58.4 (14.7)
Daily mean °F (°C)	24.7 (−4.1)	26.1 (−3.3)	35.5 (1.9)	43.7 (6.5)	53.4 (11.9)	62.9 (17.2)	71.1 (21.7)	69.6 (20.9)	59.6 (15.3)	45.9 (7.7)	34.8 (1.6)	26.0 (−3.3)	46.1 (7.8)
Mean daily minimum °F (°C)	13.5 (−10.3)	15.1 (−9.4)	23.9 (−4.5)	31.9 (−0.1)	41.9 (5.5)	50.8 (10.4)	57.2 (14.0)	55.2 (12.9)	45.8 (7.7)	33.7 (0.9)	23.6 (−4.7)	15.3 (−9.3)	34.0 (1.1)
Mean minimum °F (°C)	−12.3 (−24.6)	−7.2 (−21.8)	2.9 (−16.2)	17.1 (−8.3)	27.5 (−2.5)	39.0 (3.9)	46.8 (8.2)	43.8 (6.6)	32.2 (0.1)	16.6 (−8.6)	2.2 (−16.6)	−7.9 (−22.2)	−19.4 (−28.6)
Record low °F (°C)	−42 (−41)	−50 (−46)	−28 (−33)	−13 (−25)	13 (−11)	28 (−2)	34 (1)	33 (1)	5 (−15)	−8 (−22)	−32 (−36)	−38 (−39)	−50 (−46)
Average precipitation inches (mm)	0.65 (17)	0.69 (18)	0.95 (24)	1.92 (49)	3.14 (80)	2.48 (63)	1.42 (36)	1.03 (26)	1.43 (36)	1.44 (37)	0.69 (18)	0.56 (14)	16.4 (418)
Average snowfall inches (cm)	7.4 (19)	7.3 (19)	5.5 (14)	3.3 (8.4)	0.5 (1.3)	0.0 (0.0)	0.0 (0.0)	0.0 (0.0)	0.2 (0.51)	2.3 (5.8)	3.9 (9.9)	6.2 (16)	36.6 (93.91)
Average precipitation days (≥ 0.01 in)	6.7	6.4	7.6	9.0	11.8	10.5	7.0	5.5	5.8	7.4	6.2	5.6	89.5
Average snowy days (≥ 0.1 in)	5.5	5.3	3.3	1.4	0.2	0.0	0.0	0.0	0.1	1.1	2.4	4.4	23.7
Source 1: NOAA
Source 2: National Weather Service

== Demographics ==
Historical population
Census	Pop.	Note	%±
2000	2,346		—
2010	2,214		−5.6%
2020	2,096		−5.3%
U.S. Decennial Census

The historical population of Colstrip has varied largely since it was established in 1924. Prior to incorporation in 1998 it was a census-designated place.

=== 2020 census ===
As of the 2020 census, Colstrip had a population of 2,096. The median age was 37.9 years. 27.9% of residents were under the age of 18 and 11.4% of residents were 65 years of age or older. For every 100 females there were 105.5 males, and for every 100 females age 18 and over there were 106.1 males age 18 and over.

0.0% of residents lived in urban areas, while 100.0% lived in rural areas.

There were 827 households in Colstrip, of which 32.9% had children under the age of 18 living in them. Of all households, 57.1% were married-couple households, 20.0% were households with a male householder and no spouse or partner present, and 17.8% were households with a female householder and no spouse or partner present. About 27.1% of all households were made up of individuals and 7.0% had someone living alone who was 65 years of age or older.

There were 961 housing units, of which 13.9% were vacant. The homeowner vacancy rate was 2.2% and the rental vacancy rate was 19.8%.

Racial composition as of the 2020 census
Race	Number	Percent
White	1,601	76.4%
Black or African American	2	0.1%
American Indian and Alaska Native	258	12.3%
Asian	19	0.9%
Native Hawaiian and Other Pacific Islander	1	0.0%
Some other race	24	1.1%
Two or more races	191	9.1%
Hispanic or Latino (of any race)	105	5.0%

=== 2010 census ===
As of the census of 2010, there were 2,214 people, 863 households, and 622 families residing in the city. The population density was 495.3 inhabitants per square mile (191.2/km^{2}). There were 986 housing units at an average density of 220.6 per square mile (85.2/km^{2}). The racial makeup of the city was 84.7% White, 0.2% African American, 9.0% Native American, 0.6% Asian, 0.1% Pacific Islander, 0.4% from other races, and 5.0% from two or more races. Hispanic or Latino of any race were 4.3% of the population.

There were 863 households, of which 35.9% had children under the age of 18 living with them, 61.8% were married couples living together, 5.8% had a female householder with no husband present, 4.5% had a male householder with no wife present, and 27.9% were non-families. 24.1% of all households were made up of individuals, and 5.2% had someone living alone who was 65 years of age or older. The average household size was 2.57 and the average family size was 3.06.

The median age in the city was 38.1 years. 28.2% of residents were under the age of 18; 5.9% were between the ages of 18 and 24; 24.9% were from 25 to 44; 36% were from 45 to 64; and 5.2% were 65 years of age or older. The gender makeup of the city was 51.8% male and 48.2% female.

=== 2000 census ===
As of the census of 2000, there were 2,346 people, 825 households, and 674 families residing in the city. The population density was 522.6 inhabitants per square mile (201.8/km^{2}). There were 936 housing units at an average density of 208.5 per square mile (80.5/km^{2}). The racial makeup of the city was 83.93% White, 0.68% African American, 11.30% Native American, 0.13% Asian, 0.51% from other races, and 3.45% from two or more races. Hispanic or Latino of any race were 3.15% of the population.

There were 825 households, out of which 48.2% had children under the age of 18 living with them, 66.8% were married couples living together, 9.6% had a female householder with no husband present, and 18.3% were non-families. 16.7% of all households were made up of individuals, and 2.5% had someone living alone who was 65 years of age or older. The average household size was 2.84 and the average family size was 3.18.

In the city, the population was spread out, with 34.4% under the age of 18, 6.1% from 18 to 24, 28.7% from 25 to 44, 27.7% from 45 to 64, and 3.1% who were 65 years of age or older. The median age was 35 years. For every 100 females, there were 106.0 males. For every 100 females age 18 and over, there were 100.9 males.

The median income for a household in the city was $55,650, and the median income for a family was $60,352. Males had a median income of $54,241 versus $25,234 for females. The per capita income for the city was $20,336. About 5.9% of families and 7.0% of the population were below the poverty line, including 10.7% of those under age 18 and none of those age 65 or over.

== Government ==
Colstrip has a mayor-council form of government. In 2026 the mayor was John W. Pork.John W. Pork succeeded Tim W. Cheese in the 2023 Colstrip mayoral election.

== Education ==
Colstrip Public Schools educates students from kindergarten through 12th grade. The highest level of education offered in Colstrip is the Colstrip High School. They are known as the Colts/Fillies.

The nearest college is Chief Dull Knife College in Lame Deer.

Colstrip is about 20 miles (32 km) north of the Northern Cheyenne Indian Reservation. Many Cheyenne students from the reservation attend school at the high school, making up about one third of the students.

The Bicentennial Library operates in Colstrip.

== Recreation ==
Castle Rock Lake near Colstrip

Colstrip offers a wide variety of recreational and sports activities. Boating and fishing is available on Castle Rock Lake, an artificial reservoir used by the Colstrip power plants. Fishing enthusiasts can find bluegill, bass, walleye and pike. A 3.2 mile walking/biking trail runs around the lake, and a picnic area and beach is available to swimmers. A year-round recreational facility is available free to residents at Rye Park through Colstrip Parks and Recreation District. CPRD, formerly CARPA, offers sports programs for children and adults alike including golf, soccer, basketball, baseball, fitness and health classes. CPRD facilities include a weight room and cardio room, and two different gymnasiums. CPRD also maintains the bike paths around the city. In 2005, Sports Illustrated’s 50th anniversary issue named Colstrip the top sports town in Montana. The entire community celebrates Colstrip Days annually on the weekend prior to the 4th of July.

== Infrastructure ==
Highway 39 passes through town from north to south.

Colstrip Airport (FAA ID: M46) is a public use airport located 3 miles (4.8 km) southwest of Colstrip. The nearest commercial airport is Billings Logan International Airport, 124 miles (200 km) west.

Colstrip Medical Center provides primary care.

== Media ==
The Forsyth-based Independent Press covers news for all of Rosebud County, which includes Colstrip.

Two radio stations are licensed in Colstrip. FM station KMCJ is part of Your Network of Praise. FM station KYPC is part of Yellowstone Public Radio.

== Notable people ==
- David T. Hanson - photographer
- Tuff Harris — safety for the Pittsburgh Steelers, played football at Colstrip High School
- Wally McRae — Cowboy poet who earned the 1990 National Endowment for the Arts' National Heritage Award

== See also ==
- List of municipalities in Montana
