= Decker, Montana =

Unincorporated community in Big Horn County, Montana, United States

- Unincorporated community
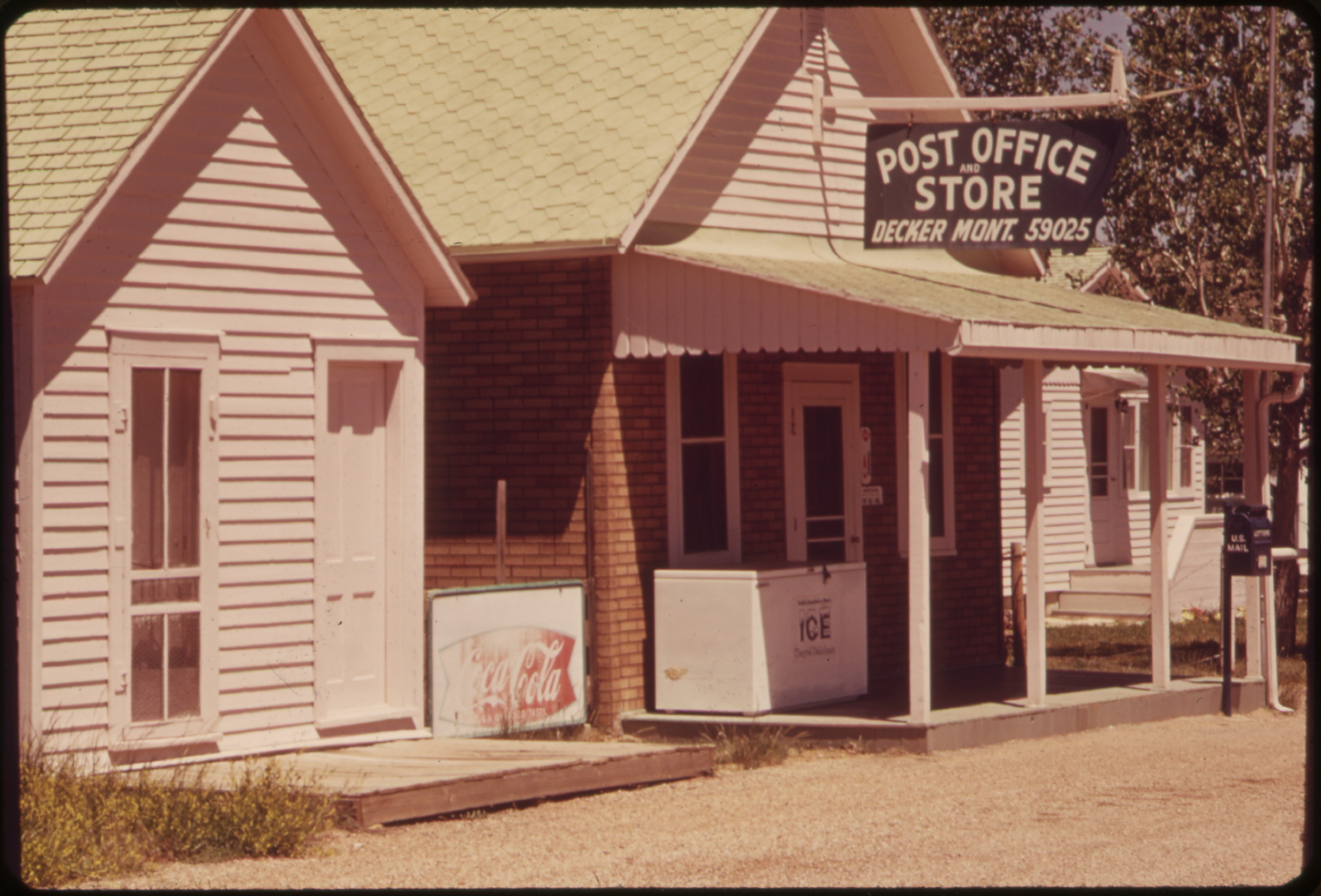
- Decker Post Office and General Store

- Location within Montana Location within the United States
- Coordinates: 45°00′43″N 106°51′48″W
- Country: United States
- State: Montana
- County: Big Horn
- Elevation: 3,524 ft (1,074 m)

Population
  - Total: 76
- Time zone: UTC-7 (Mountain (MST))
  - Summer (DST): UTC-6 (MDT)
- ZIP code: 59025
- Area code: 406
- GNIS feature ID: 770540

Decker is an unincorporated community in Big Horn County, Montana, United States.

== Description ==
The community is located along Secondary Highway 314, 15.5 miles (24.9 km) north-northeast of Sheridan. Decker has a post office with ZIP code 59025. The community is home to a one-room public school, the Spring Creek School; it has nine pupils and is one of 200 remaining one-room public schools in the United States.

In the late 1930s, the State Water Conservation Board constructed the Tongue River Dam, creating a reservoir just north of Decker.

== Climate ==
According to the Köppen Climate Classification system, Decker has a semi-arid climate, abbreviated "BSk" on climate maps.
