= Tongue River Dam =

Dam in Montana, United States

Tongue River Reservoir
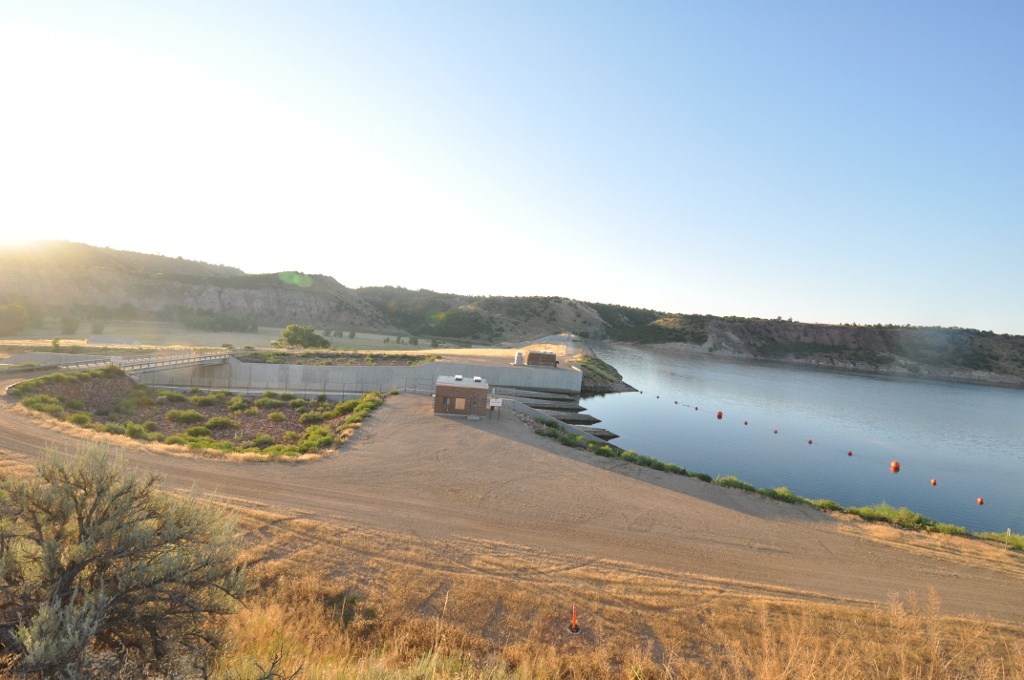
- Tongue River Dam

- Location within Montana
- Location: Big Horn County, Montana
- Coordinates: 45°03′38″N 106°47′24″W
- Lake type: Reservoir
- Primary inflows: Tongue River
- Primary outflows: Tongue River
- Basin countries: United States
- Max. length: 5.5 miles (8.9 km)
- Max. width: 1.1 miles (1.8 km)
- Surface area: 3,700 acres (1,500 ha)
- Water volume: 79,071 acre-feet (97,533,000 m^{3})
- Surface elevation: 4,222 feet (1,287 m)

The Tongue River Dam (National Inventory of Dams ID MT00002) is a dam in Big Horn County, Montana, United States, a few miles north of the Wyoming state border. It impounds the Tongue River, creating the Tongue River Reservoir.

The earthen dam was constructed in the river canyon in 1939, with a height of 91 feet (28 m) and a length at its crest of 1,824 feet (556 m). It impounds Montana's north-flowing Tongue River for flood control and irrigation water storage. The dam and reservoir are owned and operated by the Montana Department of Natural Resources and Conservation.

The 12-mile-long (19 km) riverine reservoir it creates has a normal water surface of 5.5 square miles (14 km^{2}), a maximum capacity of 150,000 acre-feet (190,000,000 m^{3}), and normal storage of 69,400 acre-feet (85,600,000 m^{3}). Recreation includes boating, fishing for bass, crappie, walleye and northern pike, and camping in the Tongue River Reservoir State Park. For white-water rafters, the Tongue is a Class I river from the Dam downstream (northward) to its confluence with the Yellowstone River.
