= List of bridges in the United States by state =

This list of bridges in the United States is organized by state and includes notable bridges (both existing and destroyed) in the United States. There are more than 600,000 bridges in the U.S.

== Alabama ==
- Alamuchee-Bellamy Covered Bridge
- Battleship Parkway, Mobile
- Captain William J. Hudson "Steamboat Bill" Memorial Bridges, Decatur
- Clarkson–Legg Covered Bridge
- Clement C. Clay Bridge
- Cochrane–Africatown USA Bridge, Mobile
- Coldwater Covered Bridge
- Comer Bridge
- Dauphin Island Bridge, near Mobile
- Easley Covered Bridge
- Edmund Pettus Bridge, Selma
- General W.K. Wilson Jr. Bridge, carrying Interstate 65 over the Mobile and Tensaw River deltas north of Mobile
- Gilliland-Reese Covered Bridge
- Half Chance Iron Bridge
- Horton Mill Covered Bridge
- Hugh R. Thomas Bridge
- Jubilee Parkway, Mobile
- Kymulga Mill & Covered Bridge
- Lidy Walker Covered Bridge
- Nectar Covered Bridge
- Norfolk Southern Tennessee River Bridge
- Oakachoy Covered Bridge
- Old Union Crossing Covered Bridge
- Paul Bryant Bridge
- Ross Creek Bridge
- Salem-Shotwell Covered Bridge
- Swann Covered Bridge
- Tallahatchee Covered Bridge
- Waldo Covered Bridge
- Woolsey Finnell Bridge

=== See also ===
- List of bridges documented by the Historic American Engineering Record in Alabama
- List of bridges on the National Register of Historic Places in Alabama
- List of crossings of the Tennessee River
- Waterways forming and crossings of the Gulf Intracoastal Waterway

== Alaska ==
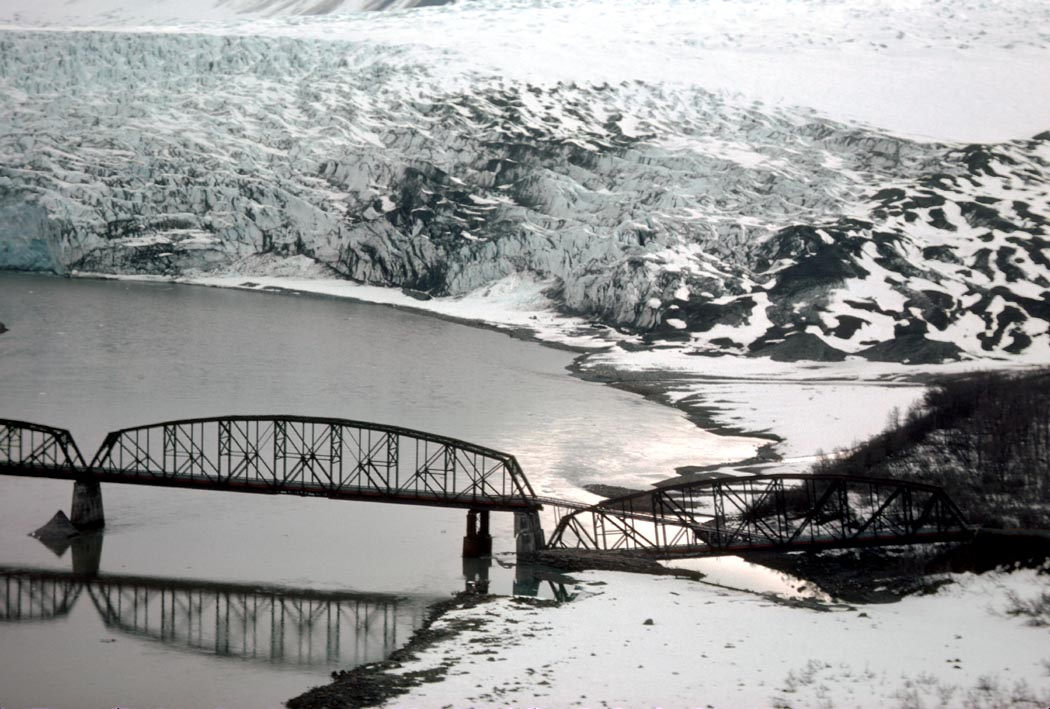
Miles Glacier Bridge, also known as Million Dollar Bridge

- Brotherhood Bridge
- Captain William Moore Bridge
- E. L. Patton Yukon River Bridge
- Gravina Island Bridge, Ketchikan to Gravina Island
- Hurricane Gulch Bridge
- John O'Connell Bridge
- Juneau-Douglas Bridge, Juneau
- Knik Arm Bridge
- Mears Memorial Bridge
- Miles Glacier Bridge (Million Dollar Bridge), Cordova
- Susitna River Bridge

=== See also ===
- List of bridges documented by the Historic American Engineering Record in Alaska
- List of bridges on the National Register of Historic Places in Alaska

== Arizona ==
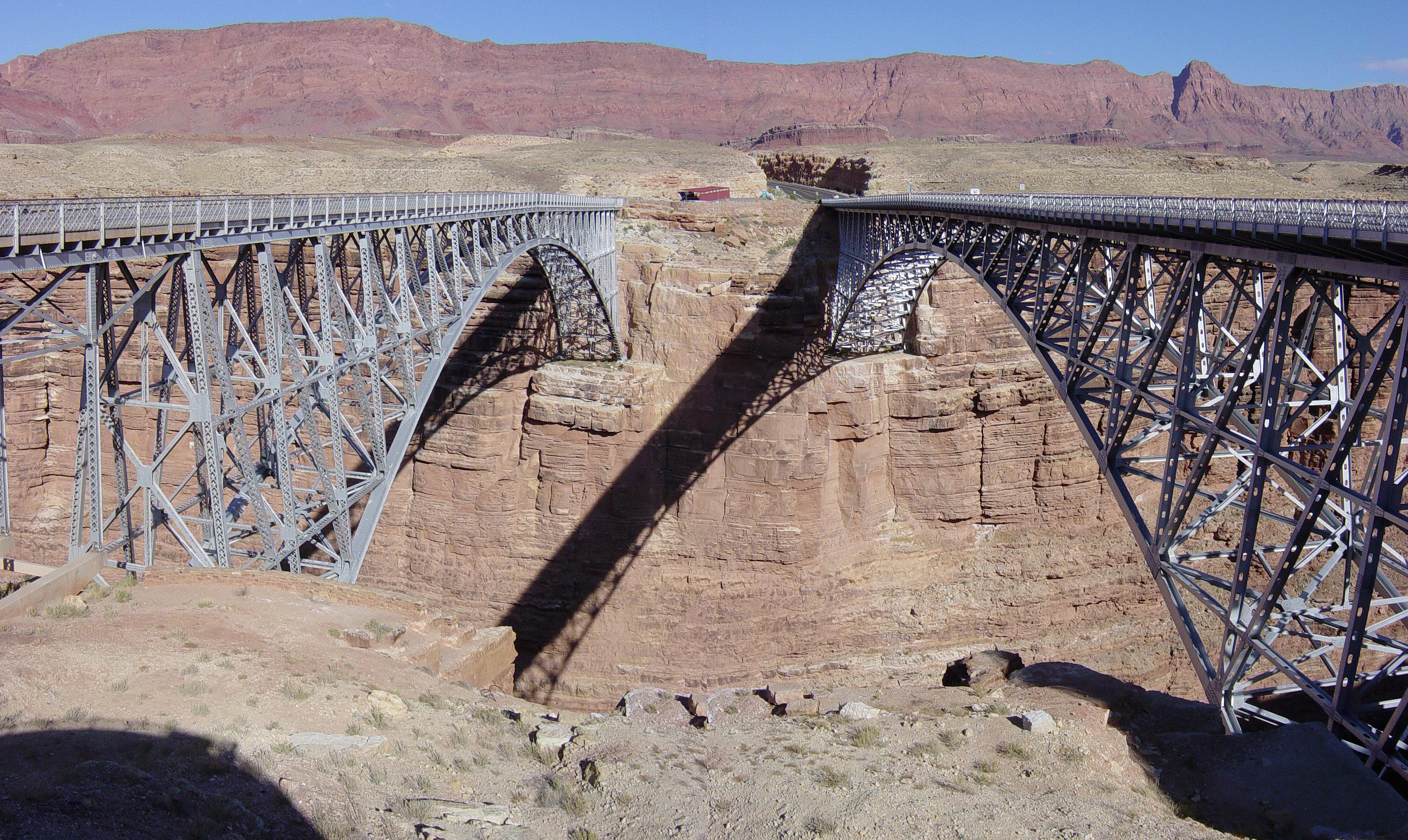
Navajo Bridge

- Black Suspension Bridge
- Cameron Suspension Bridge
- Cedar Canyon Bridge
- Chevelon Creek Bridge
- Ciénega Bridge
- Corduroy Creek Bridge
- Fossil Creek Bridge
- Gillespie Dam Bridge, Maricopa County, Arizona
- Glen Canyon Dam Bridge, Page, at the Glen Canyon Dam
- Grand Canyon Skywalk
- London Bridge, Lake Havasu City
- Mike O'Callaghan–Pat Tillman Memorial Bridge (Arizona-Nevada border)
- Mill Avenue Bridges
- Navajo Bridge, Colorado River, near Lee's Ferry
- Ocean to Ocean Bridge
- Old Trails Bridge
- Park Avenue Bridge
- Perkinsville Bridge
- Sand Hollow Wash Bridge
- Verde River Bridge
- Winkelman Bridge

=== See also ===
- List of bridges documented by the Historic American Engineering Record in Arizona
- List of bridges on the National Register of Historic Places in Arizona

== Arkansas ==
- Amboy Overpass
- AR 289 Bridge Over English Creek
- Arkansas Highway 57 Bridge
- Beaver Bridge
- Benjamin G. Humphreys Bridge
- Big Bottom Slough Bridge
- Big Dam Bridge, Little Rock
- Big Piney Creek Bridge
- Black River Bridge
- Broadway Bridge
- Buffalo River Bridge
- Cache River Bridge
- Cane Hill Road Bridge
- Cannon Creek Bridge
- Cedar Creek Bridge (Petit Jean State Park)
- Cedar Creek Bridge (Rosie)
- Central Avenue
- Charles W. Dean Bridge
- Coon Creek Bridge
- Coop Creek Bridge
- Cotter Bridge
- Cove Creek Bridge (Corley)
- Cove Creek Bridge (Martinville)
- Cove Creek Tributary Bridge
- Cove Lake Spillway Dam-Bridge
- Craighead County Road 513C Bridge
- Crooked Creek Bridge
- Crowley's Ridge State Park-Bridge
- DeGray Creek Bridge
- Edgemere Street Bridge
- Evansville-Dutch Mills Road Bridge
- Fourche LaFave River Bridge
- Frisco Bridge
- Frog Bayou Bridge
- Goff Farm Stone Bridge
- Greenville Bridge
- Hackett Creek Bridge
- Haggard Ford Swinging Bridge
- Hale Creek Bridge
- Harahan Bridge
- Harp Creek Bridge
- Helena Bridge
- Hernando de Soto Bridge, Memphis to Mound City
- Highway 79 Bridge
- Highway B-1, Little Telico Creek Bridge
- Highway B-29 Bridge
- Illinois River Bridge (Pedro)
- Illinois River Bridge (Siloam Springs)
- Illinois River Bridge at Phillips Ford
- Judsonia Bridge
- Lafayette Street Overpass
- Lake Catherine State Park-Bridge No. 2
- Lake No. 1 Bridge
- Lakeshore Drive Bridge
- Lee Creek Bridge (Natural Dam)
- Lee Creek Bridge (Van Buren)
- Lincoln Avenue Viaduct
- Little Buffalo River Bridge
- Little Cossatot River Bridge
- Little Cypress Creek Bridge
- Little Missouri River Bridge
- Main Street Bridge
- Maple Street Overpass
- Marr's Creek Bridge
- Middle Fork of the Little Red River Bridge
- Milltown Bridge
- Mountain Fork Bridge
- Mulberry River Bridge (Pleasant Hill)
- Mulberry River Bridge (Turner's Bend)
- Mulladay Hollow Bridge
- Newport Bridge
- North Fork Bridge
- North Jackson Street Bridge
- North Sylamore Creek Bridge
- North Washington Street Bridge
- Old Benton-Sardis Road Bridge
- Old Highway 16 Bridge
- Old River Bridge
- Osage Creek Bridge
- Ouachita River Bridge
- Petit Jean River Bridge (Logan County)
- Petit Jean River Bridge (Yell County)
- Red River Bridge
- Rennic Road Bridge
- Rock Island Bridge
- Sebastian County Road 4G Bridge
- Self Creek Bridge
- Short Mountain Creek Bridge
- South Fork Bridge
- South Fourche LaFave River Bridge
- Spring Lake Bridge
- Spring River Bridge
- Springfield Bridge
- St. Francis River Bridge (Lake City)
- St. Francis River Bridge (Madison)
- St. Louis-San Francisco Overpass
- State Highway 96 Bridge
- State Highway 274 Bridge
- Sylamore Creek Bridge
- U.S. 62 White River Bridge
- U.S. 64 Horsehead Creek Bridge
- US 62 Bridge over Crooked Creek
- US 63 Black River Bridge
- US 67 Bridge over Little Missouri River
- Van Buren County Road 2E Bridge
- Wallace Bridge
- War Eagle Bridge
- War Eagle Creek Bridge
- Ward's Crossing Bridge
- Warrens Bridge
- Waterside Street Bridge
- West James Street Overpass
- White River Bridge at Elkins
- Woolsey Bridge
- Yancopin Bridge

=== See also ===
- List of bridges documented by the Historic American Engineering Record in Arkansas
- List of bridges on the National Register of Historic Places in Arkansas

== California ==
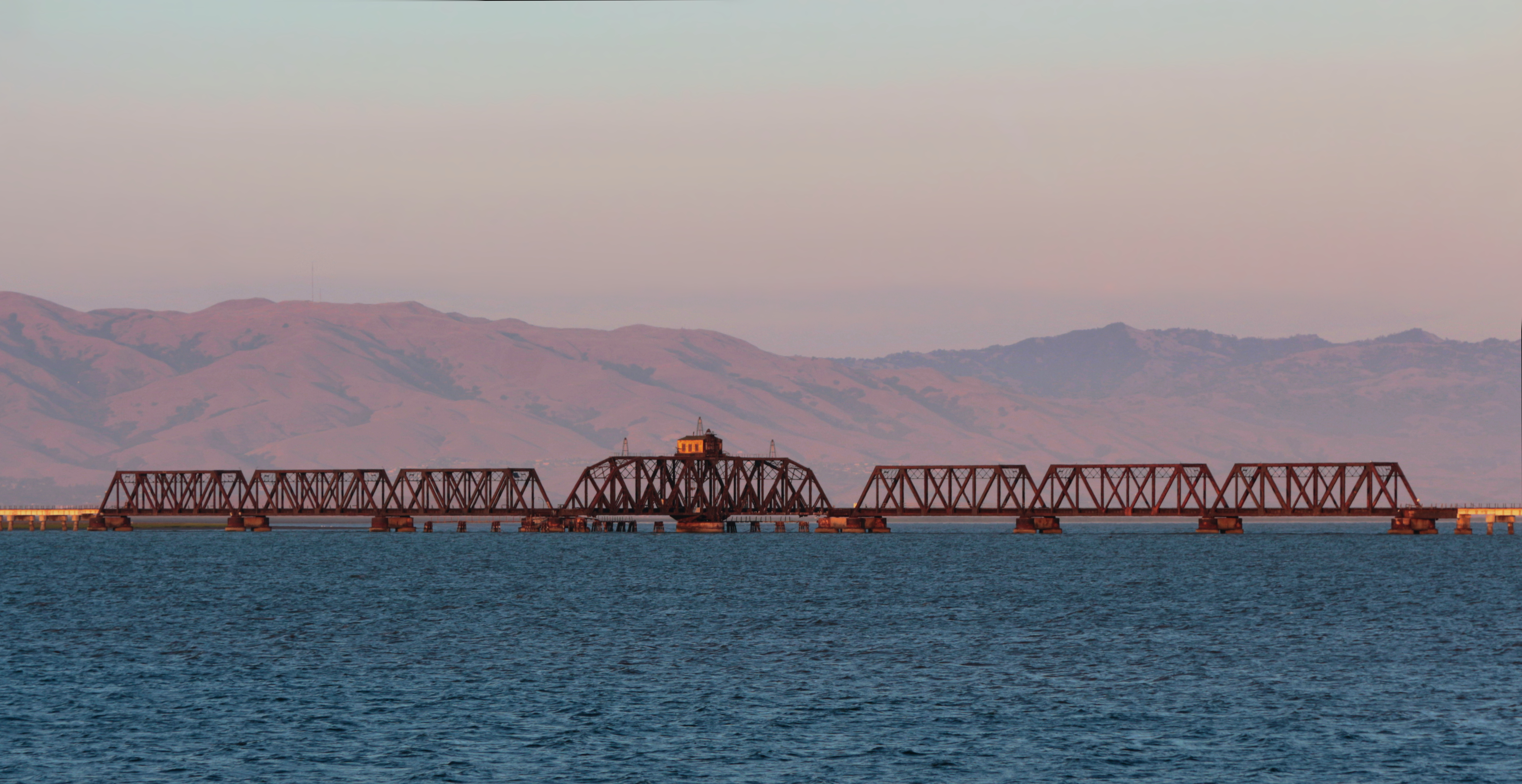
The decommissioned Dumbarton Rail Bridge in 2021.

- Antioch Bridge, San Francisco Bay Area
- Benicia–Martinez Bridge, San Francisco Bay Area
- Bixby Creek Bridge, State Route 1 in Big Sur
- Bridgeport Covered Bridge, Grass Valley
- Carquinez Bridge, San Francisco Bay Area
- Cold Spring Canyon Arch Bridge, Santa Barbara County
- Confusion Hill Bridges, Mendocino County, crossing the South Fork Eel River
- Dumbarton Bridge, San Francisco Bay Area
- Dumbarton Rail Bridge (decommissioned), San Francisco Bay Area
- Felton Covered Bridge, Felton
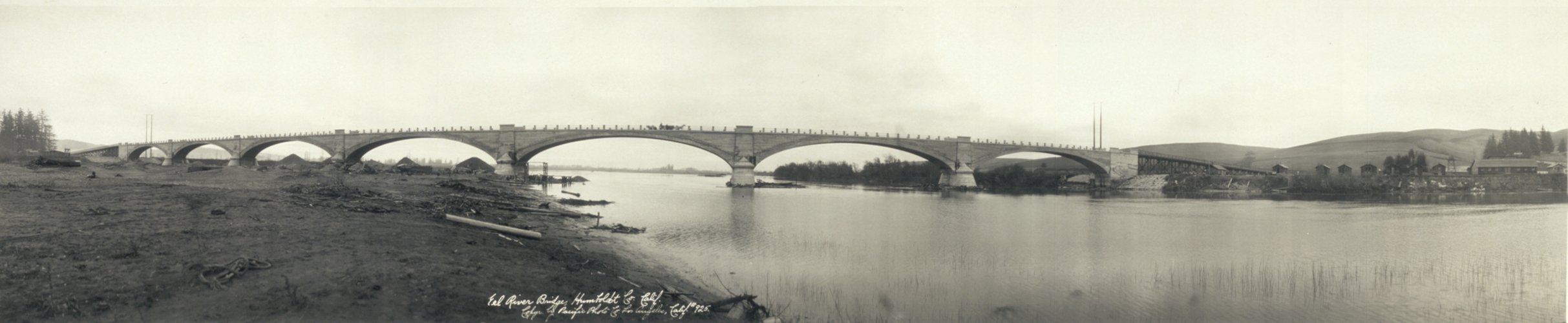
- Photo of Fernbridge bridge, now the longest reinforced concrete bridge still in use, then called Eel River bridge, Humboldt County, California, United States. c. 1912.
  Fernbridge (bridge), Fernbridge (near Ferndale)
- Foresthill Bridge, Auburn
- Golden Gate Bridge, San Francisco Bay Area
- Muir Trestle, Martinez
- Richmond–San Rafael Bridge, San Francisco Bay Area
- San Mateo–Hayward Bridge, San Francisco Bay Area
- San Diego–Coronado Bridge, San Diego
- San Francisco–Oakland Bay Bridge, San Francisco Bay Area
- Sixth Street Viaduct, Los Angeles
- Sundial Bridge, Redding
- Tower Bridge, Sacramento
- Vincent Thomas Bridge, San Pedro

== Colorado ==
- Cherry Creek Bridge
- Dolores River Bridge
- Maroon Creek Bridge
- Middle Bridge
- Red Cliff Bridge
- Royal Gorge Bridge – World's second highest suspension bridge
- Slate Creek Bridge
- South Canon Bridge

=== See also ===
- List of bridges documented by the Historic American Engineering Record in Colorado
- List of bridges on the National Register of Historic Places in Colorado

== Connecticut ==
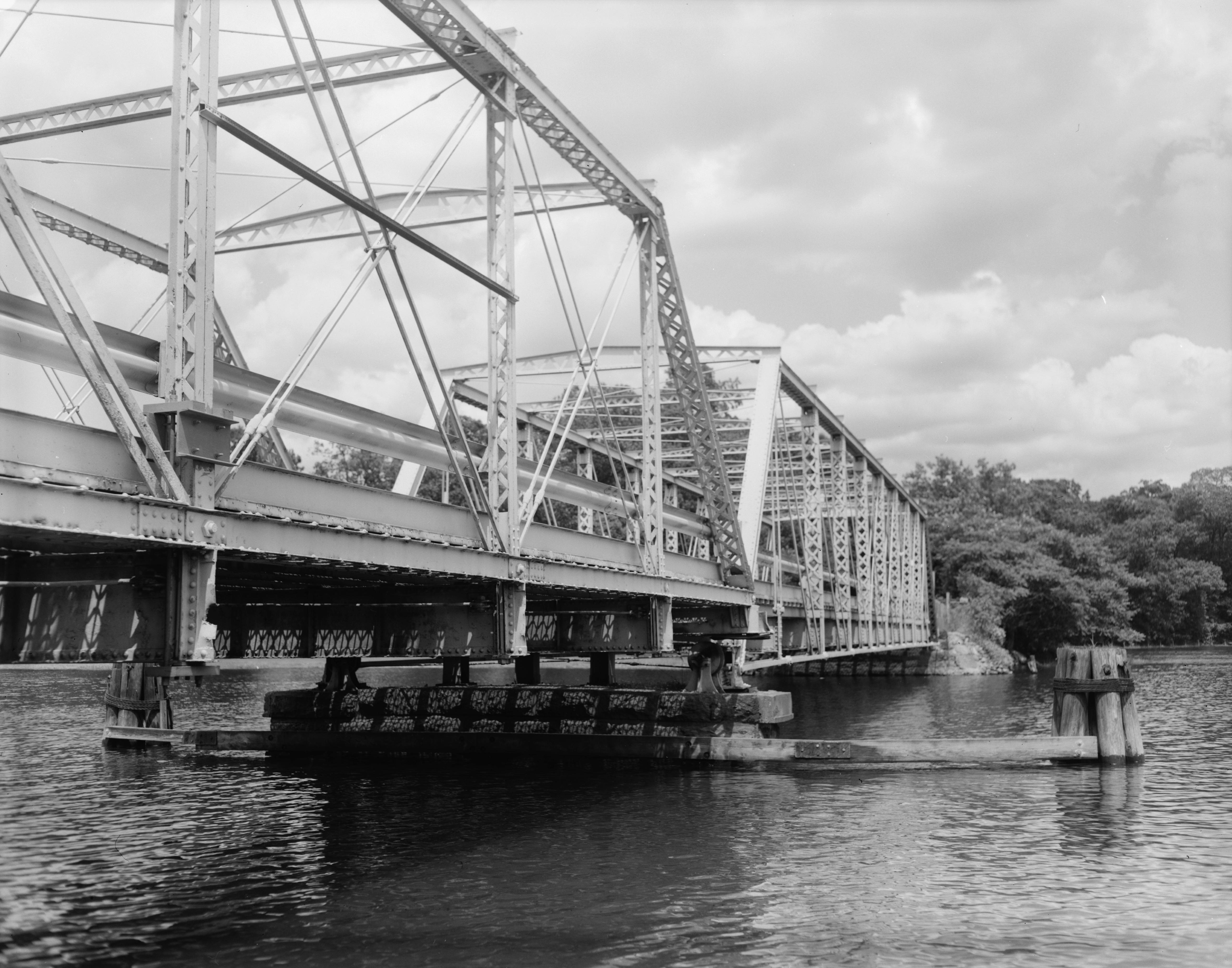
Saugatuck River Bridge, a swing bridge

- Amtrak/Springfield Terminal Railroad Bridge, Enfield to Suffield
- Arrigoni Bridge, Portland to Middletown
- Bissell Bridge, Windsor to South Windsor
- Bulkeley Bridge, Hartford
- Charter Oak Bridge, Hartford to East Hartford
- Connecticut Southern railroad bridge, Hartford
- Dexter Coffin Bridge, Windsor Locks to East Windsor
- East Haddam Bridge, East Haddam (reputed to be the longest swingbridge in the world)
- Enfield–Suffield Veterans Bridge, Enfield to Suffield
- Founders Bridge, Hartford
- Gold Star Bridge, New London to Groton
- Igor I. Sikorsky Memorial Bridge, Stratford
- Mystic River Bascule Bridge, Mystic
- Mianus River Bridge
- Pearl Harbor Memorial Bridge, New Haven
- Providence & Worcester railroad bridge Middletown
- Raymond E. Baldwin Bridge, Old Saybrook to Old Lyme
- Saugatuck River Bridge, a swing bridge
- Washington Bridge, Milford and Stratford
- West Cornwall Covered Bridge, Cornwall
- William H. Putnam Memorial Bridge, Wethersfield to Glastonbury

=== See also ===
- List of bridges documented by the Historic American Engineering Record in Connecticut
- List of bridges of the Merritt Parkway
- List of bridges on the National Register of Historic Places in Connecticut
- List of crossings of the Connecticut River
- List of crossings of the Housatonic River
- List of waterways forming and crossings of the Atlantic Intracoastal Waterway

== Delaware ==
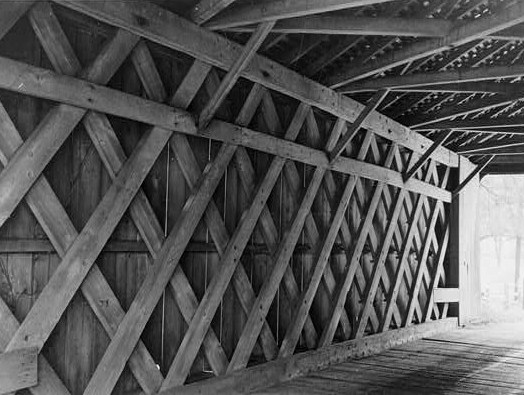
Lattice-work of the Ashland Covered Bridge

- Chesapeake & Delaware Canal Lift Bridge, railroad bridge
- Delaware Memorial Bridge, New Castle to Deepwater, New Jersey
- Indian River Inlet Bridge, Bethany Beach to Dewey Beach
- Reedy Point Bridge, Delaware City to Port Penn
- Senator William V. Roth Jr. Bridge, St. Georges
- South Market Street Bridge, Wilmington
- St. Georges Bridge, St. Georges
- Summit Bridge, Glasgow to Middletown
- Wilmington Rail Viaduct, Wilmington
- Ashland covered bridge

=== See also ===
- List of bridges documented by the Historic American Engineering Record in Delaware
- List of bridges on the National Register of Historic Places in Delaware
- List of waterways forming and crossings of the Atlantic Intracoastal Waterway

== District of Columbia ==
- 11th Street Bridges
- 14th Street Bridge
- Arlington Memorial Bridge
- Chain Bridge
- Dumbarton Bridge
- Francis Scott Key Bridge
- Frederick Douglass Memorial Bridge
- John Philip Sousa Bridge
- Taft Bridge
- Theodore Roosevelt Bridge
- Whitney Young Memorial Bridge
- Woodrow Wilson Bridge (mostly in Maryland)

=== See also ===
- List of bridges documented by the Historic American Engineering Record in Washington, D.C.
- List of bridges on the National Register of Historic Places in Washington, D.C.
- List of crossings of the Potomac River

== Florida ==
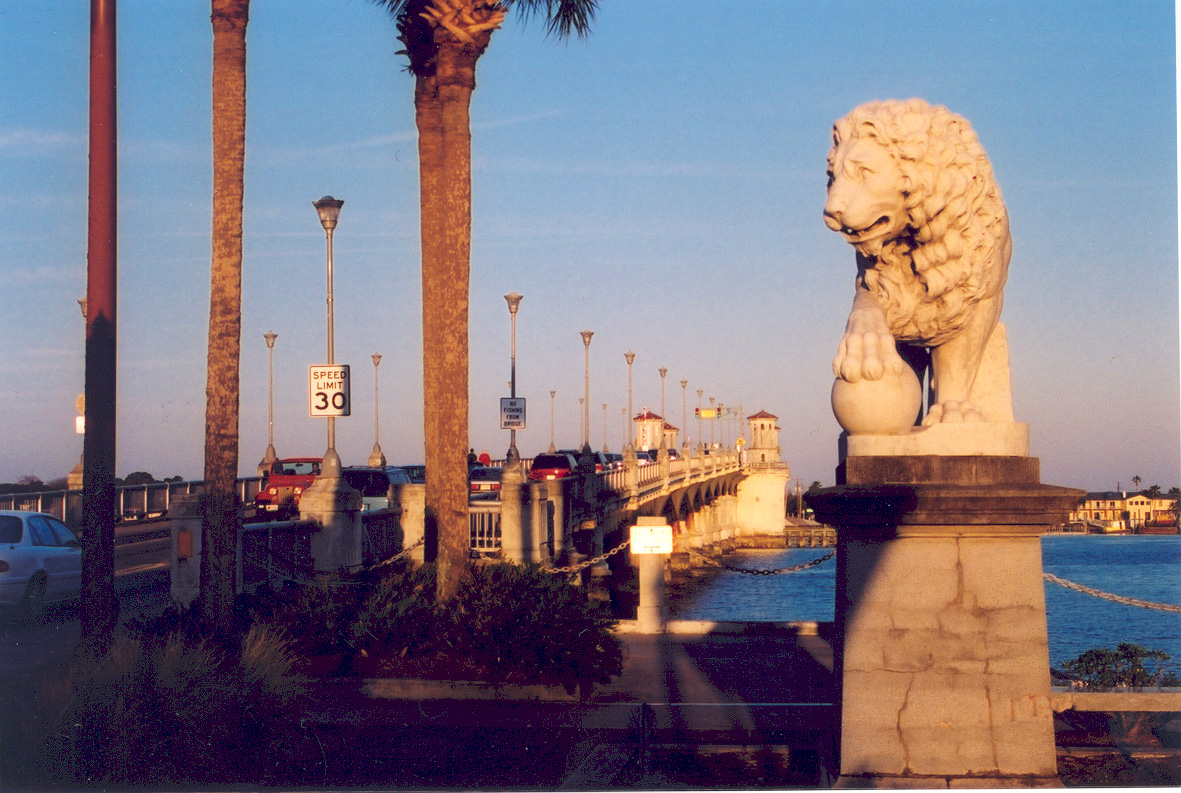
Bridge of Lions, bascule bridge in St. Augustine

- 17th Street Bridge, Vero Beach
- Acosta Bridge, Jacksonville
- Bayside Bridge, Clearwater
- Bridge of Lions, St. Augustine
- Bob Sikes Bridge, Gulf Breeze to Pensacola Beach
- Broadway Bridge, Daytona Beach
- Brooks Bridge, Fort Walton Beach
- Buckman Bridge, Jacksonville
- Caloosahatchee Bridge, Fort Myers
- Cape Coral Bridge, Fort Myers to Cape Coral
- Clearwater Memorial Causeway, Clearwater
- Courtney Campbell Causeway, Clearwater to Tampa
- Dames Point Bridge, Jacksonville
- Eau Gallie Causeway, Melbourne
- Escambia Bay Bridge, Pensacola
- Fuller Warren Bridge, Jacksonville
- Gandy Bridge, St. Petersburg to Tampa
- Garcon Point Bridge, Garcon Point
- Hal W. Adams Bridge, Suwannee River between Lafayette and Suwannee counties, Florida'a first suspension bridge
- Hart Bridge, Jacksonville
- Howard Frankland Bridge, Tampa
- Julia Tuttle Causeway, Miami Beach
- Knox Memorial Bridge, Volusia County
- MacArthur Causeway, Miami Beach
- Main Street Bridge, Jacksonville
- Mathews Bridge, Jacksonville
- Melbourne Causeway, Melbourne to Indialantic
- Merrill P. Barber Bridge, Vero Beach
- Mid-Bay Bridge, Choctawhatchee Bay, Destin to Niceville
- Midpoint Memorial Bridge, Lee County
- Navarre Beach Causeway, Navarre
- Overseas Highway, Florida Keys
- Pensacola Bay Bridge, Pensacola to Gulf Breeze
- Rickenbacker Causeway, Key Biscayne
- Roosevelt Bridge, Stuart
- Sanibel Causeway, Lee County
- Sebastian Inlet Bridge, Indian River County
- Seven Mile Bridge, Florida Keys
- Shands Bridge, Green Cove Springs
- St. George Island Bridge, Franklin County
- St. Johns River Veterans Memorial Bridge, Sanford
- Sunshine Skyway Bridge, St. Petersburg to Bradenton
- Treasure Island Causeway, Treasure Island to St. Petersburg
- Venetian Causeway, Miami Beach
- Wabasso Bridge, Wabasso

=== See also ===
- List of bridges on the National Register of Historic Places in Florida
- List of crossings of the Aucilla River
- List of crossings of the Halifax River
- List of crossings of the St. Johns River
- List of crossings of the Ochlockonee River
- List of crossings of the Suwannee River
- List of waterways forming and crossings of the Atlantic Intracoastal Waterway
- List of waterways forming and crossings of the Gulf Intracoastal Waterway

== Georgia ==
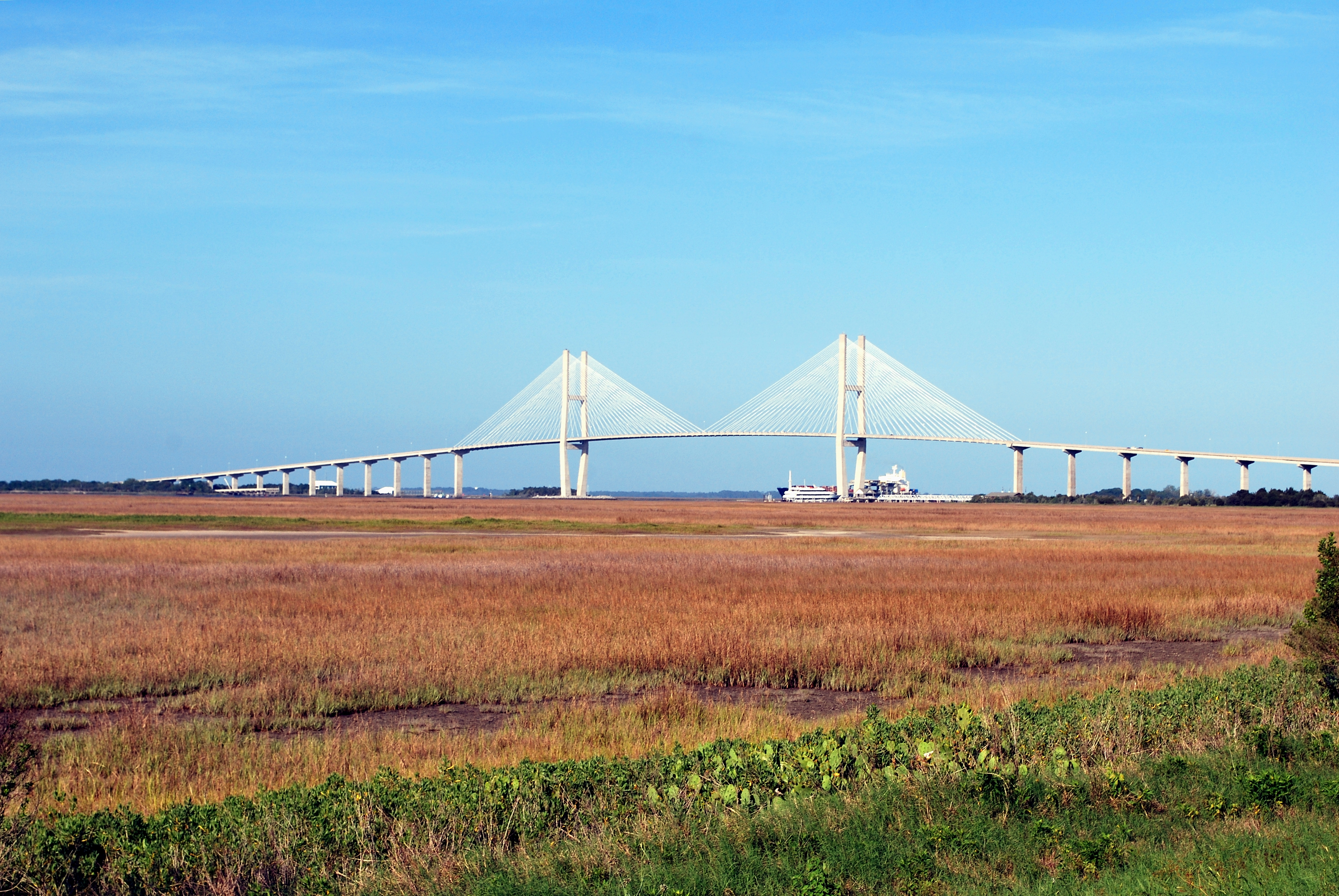
Sidney Lanier Bridge, Glynn County, Georgia

- Browns Bridge, Gainesville
- Butt Memorial Bridge, Augusta
- Dorothy Barnes Pelote Bridge, Savannah
- Euharlee Covered Bridge, Euharlee
- Georgia–Carolina Memorial Bridge, South Carolina state line, Elbert County, east-southeast of Elberton
- Herschel Lovett Bridge, Dublin–East Dublin city line
- Howard's Covered Bridge, Oglethorpe County
- Poole's Mill Covered Bridge, Forsyth County
- Price–Legg Bridge, Lincoln–Columbia county line
- Sand Bar Ferry Bridge, South Carolina state line, Richmond County, Augusta
- Shallowford Bridge, Blue Ridge
- Sidney Lanier Bridge, Brunswick
- Spook Bridge, Brooks County-Lowndes county line
- Stovall Mill Covered Bridge, White County
- Talmadge Memorial Bridge, Savannah
- Tom Moreland Interchange, also known as "Spaghetti Junction", Atlanta
- Watson Mill Bridge, Madison County

=== See also ===
- Historic bridges of the Atlanta area
- List of bridges documented by the Historic American Engineering Record in Georgia (U.S. state)
- List of bridges on the National Register of Historic Places in Georgia
- List of covered bridges in Georgia (U.S. state)
- List of waterways forming and crossings of the Atlantic Intracoastal Waterway

== Hawaii ==
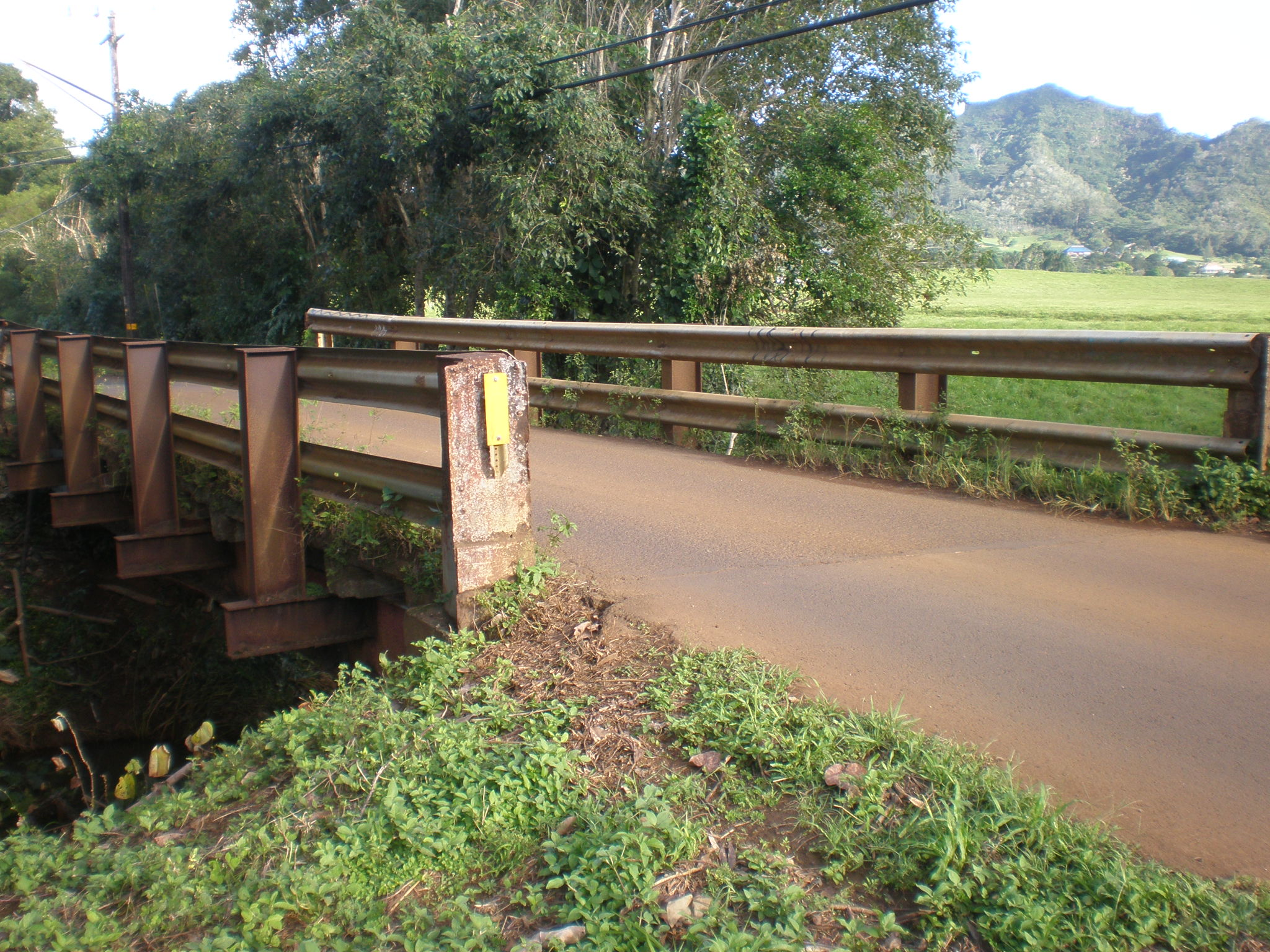
Pu'u'opae Bridge

- Admiral Clarey Bridge
- Opaekaa Road Bridge
- Pu'u'opae Bridge
- Windward Viaducts

=== See also ===
- List of bridges documented by the Historic American Engineering Record in Hawaii
- List of bridges on the National Register of Historic Places in Hawaii

== Illinois ==
- Abraham Lincoln Memorial Bridge, LaSalle/Peru
- Bob Michel Bridge, Peoria
- Canal Street railroad bridge (Pennsylvania Railroad Bridge No. 458), Chicago
- Cedar Street Bridge, Peoria
- Cherry Avenue Bridge (Chicago, Milwaukee & St. Paul Railway, Bridge No. Z-2), Chicago
- Chicago Skyway 'High Bridge', Chicago
- Clark Bridge, Alton
- Clark Street Bridge, Chicago
- Cortland Street Drawbridge, Chicago
- Dearborn Street Bridge, Chicago
- Franklin Street Bridge, Chicago
- Hazen Bridge (Newcomb Bridge), Mahomet
- John T. McNaughton Bridge, Pekin
- Kinzie Street railroad bridge (Chicago and North Western Railway), Chicago
- La Salle Street Bridge (Marshall Suloway Bridge), Chicago
- Lyndon Bridge, Lyndon
- McClugage Bridge (Ironworkers' Memorial Bridge), Peoria
- Murray Baker Bridge, Peoria
- North Avenue Bridge, Chicago
- Ottawa Rail Bridge, Ottawa
- Outer Drive Bridge, Chicago
- St. Charles Air Line Bridge, Chicago
- Shade-Lohmann Bridge, Peoria
- Shippingsport Bridge, LaSalle
- Stan Musial Veterans Memorial Bridge, St. Clair County
- State Street Bridge, Chicago
- Wells Street Bridge, Chicago

=== See also ===
- List of bridges documented by the Historic American Engineering Record in Illinois
- List of bridges on the National Register of Historic Places in Illinois
- List of crossings of the Upper Mississippi River
- Bridges in Peoria, Illinois

== Indiana ==
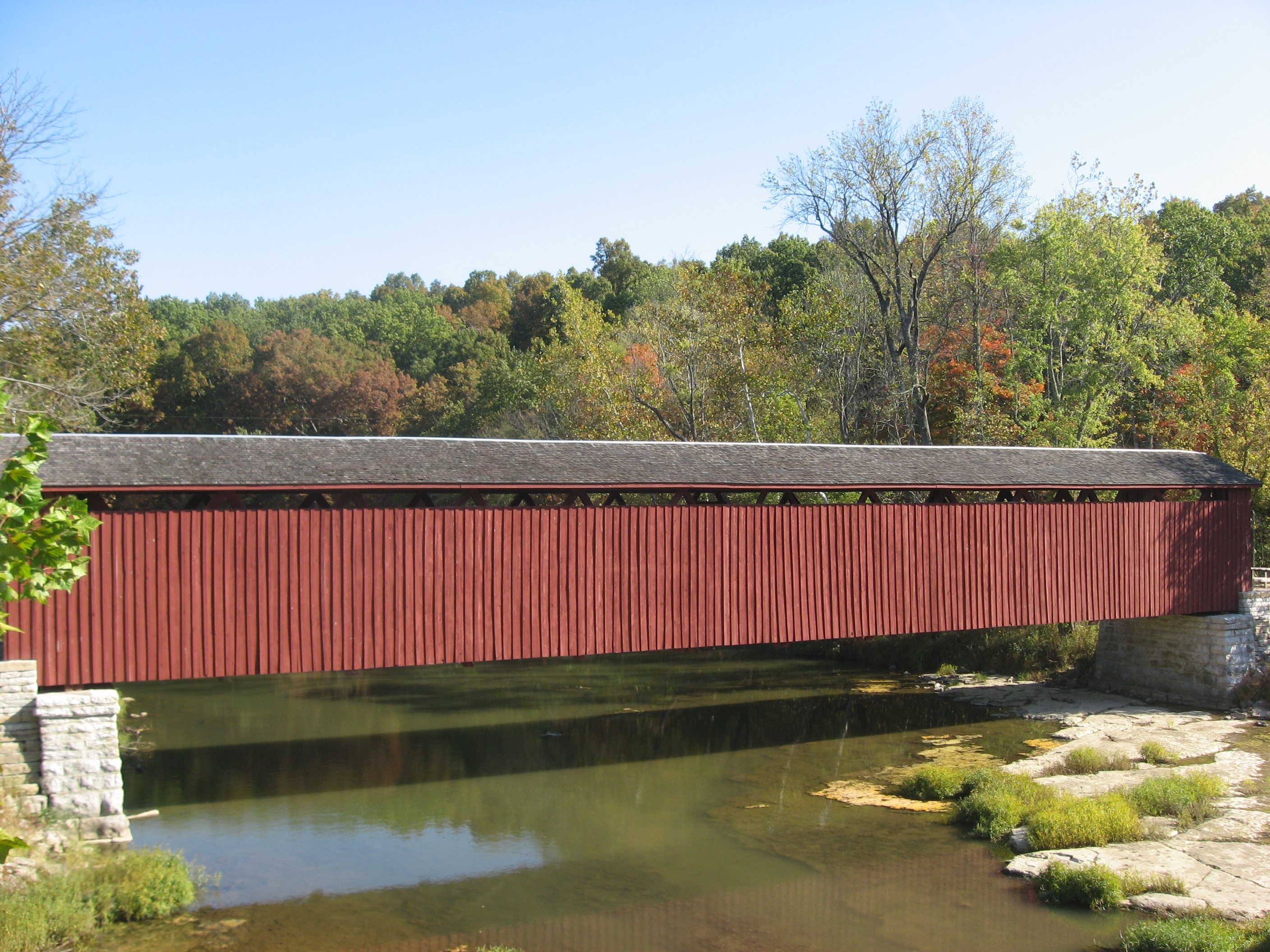
Cataract Falls Covered Bridge

- Cataract Falls Covered Bridge, Owen County, Indiana, listed on the National Register
- John F. Kennedy Memorial Bridge, Jeffersonville to Louisville, Kentucky
- Laughery Creek Bridge, Dearborn County; only known example of a Triple Whipple Truss bridge in the world
- Lincoln Memorial Bridge, downtown Vincennes to Illinois (old US 50)
- Parke County Covered Bridges
- Sherman Minton Bridge, New Albany to Louisville, Kentucky
- William H. Natcher Bridge, Rockport to Owensboro, Kentucky
- Tulip Viaduct, Solsberry, Indiana, longest railroad trestle in U.S.

=== See also ===
- List of bridges documented by the Historic American Engineering Record in Indiana
- List of bridges on the National Register of Historic Places in Indiana
- List of crossings of the Ohio River
- List of Indiana covered bridges

== Iowa ==
- Bellevue Bridge, connects Mills County, Iowa and Sarpy County, Nebraska at Bellevue, Nebraska
- Black Hawk Bridge, Lansing
- Clinton Railroad Bridge, connects Clinton, Iowa and Fulton (Albany), Illinois
- Crescent Rail Bridge, connects Davenport, Iowa to Rock Island, Illinois
- Davenport Skybridge, Davenport
- Dubuque-Wisconsin Bridge, connects Dubuque, Iowa to Grant County, Wisconsin
- Fort Madison Toll Bridge, connects Fort Madison, Iowa to Niota, Illinois
- Fred Schwengel Memorial Bridge connects LeClaire, Iowa to Rapids City, Illinois
- Gateway Bridge, connects Clinton, Iowa to Fulton, Illinois
- Government Bridge, Davenport, Iowa to Rock Island, Illinois
- Great River Bridge, connects Burlington, Iowa to Gulf Port, Illinois
- I-74 Bridge, Bettendorf, Iowa to Moline, Illinois
- Julien Dubuque Bridge, connects Dubuque, Iowa to East Dubuque, Illinois
- Keokuk-Hamilton Bridge, connects Keokuk, Iowa to Hamilton, Illinois
- Lyons-Fulton Bridge, connects Clinton, Iowa to Fulton, Illinois
- Marquette-Joliet Bridge, connects Marquette, Iowa to Prairie du Chien, Wisconsin
- Nebraska City Bridge, connects Otoe County, Nebraska with Fremont County, Iowa at Nebraska City, Nebraska
- Norbert F. Beckey Bridge, connects Muscatine, Iowa to Rock Island County, Illinois
- Plattsmouth Bridge, connects Cass County, Nebraska to Mills County, Iowa
- Rock Island Centennial Bridge, connects Davenport, Iowa to Rock Island, Illinois
- Savanna-Sabula Bridge, connects Savanna, Illinois to Sabula, Iowa
- Siouxland Veterans Memorial Bridge (formerly Combination Bridge), connects Sioux City, Iowa to South Sioux City, Nebraska
- Union Pacific Missouri River Bridge, connects Council Bluffs, Iowa to Omaha, Nebraska

=== See also ===
- List of bridges documented by the Historic American Engineering Record in Iowa
- List of bridges on the National Register of Historic Places in Iowa
- List of crossings of the Mississippi River
- List of covered bridges in Madison County, Iowa

== Kansas ==
- 12th Street Bridge, a girder bridge in Kansas City
- 18th Street Expressway Bridge, a one-level deck truss bridge over the Kansas River in Kansas City
- 23rd Street viaduct, a one-level, four-lane deck truss bridge over the Kansas River and Kemper Arena in Kansas City
- 7th Street Trafficway Bridge, a one-level deck truss bridge over the Kansas River in Kansas City
- Central Avenue Bridge, a two-level deck truss bridge over the Kansas River
- Highline Bridge, a one-level deck truss bridge on the KCTR railroad
- Intercity Viaduct, a two-level deck truss bridge over the Kansas River and sister bridge to the Lewis and Clark Viaduct
- James Street Bridge, a girder bridge over the Kansas River in Kansas City
- Kansas Avenue Bridge, a multi-beam girder over the Kansas River
- Kansas City Southern Bridge, a three-span bridge over the Kansas River
- Lewis and Clark Viaduct, a deck truss bridge over the Kansas River and sister bridge to the Intercity Viaduct
- Rock Island Bridge, a three-span bridge over the Kansas River

=== See also ===
- List of bridges documented by the Historic American Engineering Record in Kansas
- List of bridges on the National Register of Historic Places in Kansas

== Kentucky ==
- The Bi-State Vietnam Gold Star Twin Bridges, connecting Henderson, Kentucky with Evansville, Indiana
- Ben Williamson Memorial Bridge, parallel cantilever bridge connecting Coal Grove, Ohio to Ashland, Kentucky
- Brent Spence Bridge, Cincinnati to Lexington, Kentucky and Louisville, Kentucky
- Clay Wade Bailey Bridge, Cincinnati to Covington, Kentucky
- Daniel Carter Beard Bridge, Cincinnati to Newport, Kentucky
- George Rogers Clark Memorial Bridge, connects downtown Louisville, Kentucky to Clarksville, Indiana
- John A. Roebling Suspension Bridge, Cincinnati to Covington, Kentucky
- John F. Kennedy Memorial Bridge, connects Louisville, Kentucky to Clarksville, Indiana
- Newport Southbank Bridge, the world's longest pedestrian-only bridge, connects Newport, Kentucky to Cincinnati, Ohio
- Owensboro Bridge, Owensboro, Kentucky to Spencer County
- Sherman Minton Bridge, double-decked dual suspended arch bridge connecting Louisville, Kentucky to New Albany, Indiana
- Simeon Willis Memorial Bridge, cantilever parallel bridge connecting Ashland, Kentucky to Coal Grove, Ohio
- Simon Kenton Memorial Bridge, connects Maysville, Kentucky to Aberdeen, Ohio
- The Singing Bridge crosses the Kentucky River in Frankfort.
- Taylor Southgate Bridge, Cincinnati to Newport, Kentucky
- William H. Harsha Bridge, connects Maysville, Kentucky to Aberdeen, Ohio
- William H. Natcher Bridge, connects Owensboro, Kentucky to Rockport, Indiana via U.S. 231

=== See also ===
- List of bridges documented by the Historic American Engineering Record in Kentucky
- List of bridges on the National Register of Historic Places in Kentucky
- List of crossings of the Ohio River
- List of crossings of the Tennessee River

== Louisiana ==
- Almonaster Avenue Bridge, New Orleans
- Atchafalaya Basin Bridge, crosses the Atchafalaya Basin to connect Iberville Parish and St. Martin Parish; eighth longest bridge in the world by length: 29.290 km (18.200 mi)
- Caddo Lake Drawbridge, Mooringsport
- Chacahoula Swamp Bridge, Terrebonne Parish
- Claiborne Avenue Bridge, New Orleans
- CNR Bonnet Carré Spillway-Baton Rouge Bridge, St. Charles Parish
- CNR Bonnet Carré Spillway-McComb Bridge, St. Charles Parish
- Crescent City Connection, New Orleans
- Danziger Bridge, New Orleans
- Florida Avenue Bridge, New Orleans
- Gramercy Bridge, St. James Parish, St. John the Baptist Parish
- Green Bridge, New Orleans and St. Bernard Parish
- Hale Boggs Memorial Bridge, Luling and Destrehan, St. Charles Parish
- Horace Wilkinson Bridge, Baton Rouge
- Huey P. Long Bridge, Baton Rouge – carries four lanes of U.S. Route 190 across the Mississippi River. Two railroad trestles.
- Huey P. Long Bridge, Jefferson Parish – one of the longest railroad bridges in the US: 7 km (4.3 mi)
- I-10 Bonnet Carré Spillway Bridge, St. Charles Parish – carries Interstate 10 over the Bonnet Carré Spillway, Lake Pontchartrain and LaBranche Wetlands
- I-10 High Rise Bridge, New Orleans – crosses the Industrial Canal
- I-10 Twin Span Bridge, New Orleans to Slidell
- I-210 Calcasieu River High Bridge, Lake Charles
- John James Audubon Bridge, Pointe Coupee Parish and West Feliciana Parish
- Kansas City Southern Bonnet Carré Spillway Bridge, St. Charles Parish
- LaBranche Wetlands Bridge, St. Charles Parish – carries Interstate 310 over the LaBranche Wetlands
- Lake Charles I-10 Bridge, Lake Charles
- Lake Pontchartrain Causeway, Metairie to Mandeville – longest bridge in the world: 38.422 km (23.874 mi)
- Louisiana Highway 1 Bridge, Lafourche Parish
- Manchac Swamp Bridge, carries Interstate 55 over the Manchac Swamp; second-longest bridge by total length in the world: 36.710 km (22.811 mi)
- Natchez-Vidalia Bridge, Vidalia and Natchez, Mississippi
- Norfolk Southern Lake Pontchartrain Bridge – longest railroad bridge in the US: 9.3 km (5.8 mi)
- Old Vicksburg Bridge, Delta and Vicksburg, Mississippi
- Seabrook Bridge, New Orleans
- Seabrook Railroad Bridge, New Orleans
- St. Claude Avenue Bridge, New Orleans
- Sunshine Bridge, Sorrento and Donaldsonville
- U.S. 61 Bonnet Carré Spillway Bridge, St. Charles Parish – carries U.S. Route 61 over the Bonnet Carré Spillway
- Vicksburg Bridge, Tallulah and Vicksburg, Mississippi

=== See also ===
- List of bridges documented by the Historic American Engineering Record in Louisiana
- List of bridges on the National Register of Historic Places in Louisiana
- List of crossings of the Mississippi River
- Waterways forming and crossings of the Gulf Intracoastal Waterway

== Maine ==
- Bailey Island Bridge (Cribstone Bridge), Orr's Island to Bailey Island
- Casco Bay Bridge, South Portland to Portland
- Clair-Fort Kent Bridge
- Deer Isle Bridge
- Edmundston-Madawaska Bridge
- Memorial Bridge, Portsmouth, New Hampshire to Kittery
- Million Dollar Bridge, Portland to South Portland
- Piscataqua River Bridge, Portsmouth, New Hampshire to Kittery
- Penobscot Narrows Bridge, Verona
- Sarah Mildred Long Bridge, Portsmouth, New Hampshire to Kittery
- Tukey's Bridge, Portland
- Two Cent Bridge, Waterville to Winslow
- Waldo-Hancock Bridge

=== See also ===
- List of bridges documented by the Historic American Engineering Record in Maine
- List of bridges in Portland, Maine
- List of bridges on the National Register of Historic Places in Maine
- List of waterways forming and crossings of the Atlantic Intracoastal Waterway

== Maryland ==
- American Legion Memorial Bridge, Montgomery County to Fairfax County, Virginia
- Burnside's Bridge, Antietam National Battlefield, named after General Ambrose Burnside
- Benedict Bridge. Connecting Calvert County to Charles County
- Chesapeake Bay Bridge (William Preston Lane Jr. Memorial Bridge), Anne Arundel County to Queen Anne's County
- Chesapeake City Bridge, Chesapeake City
- Francis Scott Key Bridge, Baltimore
- Governor Harry W. Nice Memorial Bridge, Charles County to Dahlgren, Virginia
- Governor Thomas Johnson Bridge. Connecting Calvert County to Saint Mary's County
- Hanover Street Bridge, spanning the Middle Branch of the Patapsco River in Baltimore
- Millard E. Tydings Memorial Bridge, Cecil County
- Naval Academy Bridge, Annapolis
- Thomas J. Hatem Memorial Bridge, Havre de Grace to Perryville
- Union Arch Bridge, Cabin John
- Verrazano Bridge, Assateague Island
- Woodrow Wilson Bridge, Prince George's County to Alexandria, Virginia

=== See also ===
- List of bridges documented by the Historic American Engineering Record in Maryland
- List of bridges on the National Register of Historic Places in Maryland
- List of crossings of the Potomac River
- List of waterways forming and crossings of the Atlantic Intracoastal Waterway

== Massachusetts ==
- Bascule Bridge, Westport
- Berkley-Dighton Bridge, Berkley/Dighton
- Bourne Bridge, Bourne
- The Bridge of Flowers, a historic bridge and tourist attraction in Shelburne Falls
- Brightman Street Bridge, Fall River/Somerset
- Calvin Coolidge Bridge, Northampton/Hadley
- Canton Viaduct, Canton
- Cape Cod Canal Railroad Bridge, Bourne
- Charles M. Braga Jr. Memorial Bridge, Fall River/Somerset
- Congress Street Bridge, Boston
- Evelyn Moakley Bridge, Boston
- French King Bridge, Erving/Gill
- Harvard Bridge, Boston/Cambridge
- Leonard P. Zakim Bunker Hill Memorial Bridge, Boston
- Longfellow Bridge, Boston/Cambridge
- Medford Pipe Bridge, an historic pedestrian bridge in Medford
- Memorial Bridge, Springfield/West Springfield
- Northern Avenue Bridge, Boston
- Norwottuck Rail Trail Bridge, Northampton/Hadley
- Sagamore Bridge, Bourne
- Slade's Ferry Bridge, Fall River/Somerset
- Summer Street Bridge, Boston
- Tobin Bridge, Charlestown/Chelsea
- William Felton "Bill" Russell Bridge, Boston

=== See also ===
- List of bridges documented by the Historic American Engineering Record in Massachusetts
- List of bridges in Boston
- List of bridges on the National Register of Historic Places in Massachusetts
- List of crossings of the Connecticut River
- List of crossings of the Housatonic River
- List of waterways forming and crossings of the Atlantic Intracoastal Waterway

== Michigan ==
- Ada Covered Bridge, Ada
- Ambassador Bridge, Detroit to Windsor, Ontario, Canada
- Blue Water Bridge, Port Huron to Sarnia, Ontario, Canada
- Cut River Bridge, Mackinac County
- Fallasburg Bridge, Vergennes Township
- Gateway Bridge, Taylor
- Gordie Howe International Bridge
- Langley Covered Bridge, Centreville
- MacArthur Bridge, Detroit mainland to Belle Isle Park
- Mackinac Bridge, St. Ignace–Mackinaw City
- Portage Lake Lift Bridge, Houghton to Hancock
- Sault Ste. Marie International Bridge, Sault Ste. Marie, Michigan to Sault Ste. Marie, Ontario, Canada
- Trunk Line Bridge No. 1
- Whites Bridge, Keene Township
- Zilwaukee Bridge, near Saginaw

=== See also ===
- List of bridges documented by the Historic American Engineering Record in Michigan
- List of bridges on the National Register of Historic Places in Michigan
- List of Michigan covered bridges

== Minnesota ==
- 10th Avenue Bridge, Minneapolis
- Aerial Lift Bridge, Duluth
- Cedar Avenue Bridge (Minnesota State Highway 77 Bridge), Bloomington–Burnsville
- DeSoto Bridge, Saint Cloud
- Franklin Avenue Bridge (Cappelen Memorial Bridge), Minneapolis
- Hennepin Avenue Bridge, Minneapolis
- High Bridge, Saint Paul
- I-35W Mississippi River bridge (collapsed August 1, 2007), Minneapolis
- Intercity Bridge (Ford Parkway Bridge), Minneapolis–Saint Paul
- John A. Blatnik Bridge (Blatnik Bridge), Duluth
- Mendota Bridge, Fort Snelling–Mendota
- Richard I. Bong Memorial Bridge (Bong Bridge), Duluth
- Robert Street Bridge, Saint Paul
- Rock Island Swing Bridge (Rock Island Swing Bridge), St. Paul Park–Inver Grove Heights
- Seventh Street Improvement Arches, Saint Paul
- Stillwater Bridge (Stillwater Lift Bridge), Stillwater
- Stone Arch Bridge, Minneapolis
- Third Avenue Bridge, Minneapolis
- Wabasha Street Bridge, Saint Paul
- Washington Avenue Bridge, Minneapolis

=== See also ===
- List of bridges documented by the Historic American Engineering Record in Minnesota
- List of bridges on the National Register of Historic Places in Minnesota
- List of crossings of the Minnesota River
- List of crossings of the Mississippi River

== Mississippi ==
- Benjamin G. Humphreys Bridge
- Biloxi Bay Bridge
- Charles W. Dean Bridge
- Coon Box Fork Bridge
- Greenville Bridge
- Helena Bridge
- Mahned Bridge
- Motley Slough Bridge
- Natchez-Vidalia Bridge
- Old Hill Place Bridge
- Old Vicksburg Bridge
- Pascagoula River High Rise Bridge
- St. Louis Bay Bridge
- Stuckey's Bridge
- Vicksburg Bridge, Vicksburg
- Woodburn Bridge
- Woodrow Wilson Bridge
- Youngblood Bridge

=== See also ===
- List of bridges documented by the Historic American Engineering Record in Mississippi
- List of bridges on the National Register of Historic Places in Mississippi
- List of crossings of the Mississippi River
- Waterways forming and crossings of the Gulf Intracoastal Waterway

== Missouri ==
- ASB Bridge, Kansas City
- Bill Emerson Memorial Bridge, Cape Girardeau
- Blanchette Memorial Bridge, St. Louis
- Buck O'Neil Bridge, Kansas City
- Chain of Rocks Bridge, St. Louis
- Champ Clark Bridge (2019), Louisiana
- Chouteau Bridge, Kansas City
- Christopher S. Bond Bridge, Paseo Bridge replacement (June 1, 2011), Kansas City
- Discovery Bridge (Missouri), St. Louis
- Daniel Boone Bridge, St. Louis
- Eads Bridge, St. Louis
- Fairfax Bridge, Kansas City
- Glasgow Bridge, Missouri, Glasgow
- Hannibal Bridge, Kansas City
- Heart of America Bridge, Kansas City
- I-435 Bridge, Kansas City
- Ike Skelton Bridge, Lexington
- Jefferson Barracks Bridge, St. Louis
- Jefferson City Bridge, Jefferson City
- Lewis Bridge, Fort Bellefontaine, adjacent Bellefontaine Railroad Bridge
- Liberty Bend Bridge, Kansas City
- MacArthur Bridge, St. Louis
- Mark Twain Memorial Bridge, Hannibal
- Martin Luther King Bridge, St. Louis
- McKinley Bridge, St. Louis
- Miami Bridge, Miami
- New Chain of Rocks Bridge, St. Louis
- Paseo Bridge, Kansas City (demolished)
- Platte Purchase Bridge, Kansas City
- Poplar Street Bridge, St. Louis
- Rocheport Bridge, Rocheport
- Second Hannibal Bridge, Kansas City
- Stan Musial Veterans Memorial Bridge, St. Louis
- Veterans Memorial Bridge (Missouri), St. Louis
- Washington Bridge (Washington, Missouri), St. Louis
- Waverly Bridge (Missouri), Waverly
- Y-Bridge, Galena

=== See also ===
- List of bridges documented by the Historic American Engineering Record in Missouri
- List of bridges on the National Register of Historic Places in Missouri
- List of crossings of the Mississippi River
- List of crossings of the Missouri River
- List of Missouri covered bridges

== Montana ==
- Big Horn River Bridge
- Dearborn River High Bridge
- Fred Robinson Bridge
- Hardy Bridge
- Koocanusa Bridge, Rexford
- Lewis and Clark Bridge
- Locate Creek Bridge
- Natural Pier Bridge
- Powder River Bridge
- Snowden Bridge
- Tenth Street Bridge
- Theodore Roosevelt Memorial Bridge
- Toston Bridge
- Yellowstone River Bridge

=== See also ===
- List of bridges documented by the Historic American Engineering Record in Montana
- List of bridges on the National Register of Historic Places in Montana
- List of crossings of the Missouri River

== Nebraska ==
- Adamson Bridge
- Ak-Sar-Ben Bridge
- Ashland Bridge
- Bell Bridge
- Bellevue Bridge
- Berry State Aid Bridge
- Big Blue River Bridge (Grafton)
- Big Blue River Bridge (Surprise)
- Blair Bridge (road bridge)
- Blair Bridge (railroad bridge)
- Bob Kerrey Pedestrian Bridge
- Borman Bridge
- Brewer Bridge
- Bridge
- Brownville Bridge, Brownville, Nebraska
- Bryan Bridge
- Burt County Missouri River Bridge
- Carns State Aid Bridge
- Chief Standing Bear Memorial Bridge
- Colclesser Bridge
- Deering Bridge
- Discovery Bridge
- Franklin Bridge
- Illinois Central Missouri River Bridge
- Lewellen State Aid Bridge
- Lewis Bridge
- Lisco State Aid Bridge
- Loosveldt Bridge
- Meridian Highway Bridge
- Mormon Bridge
- Mynard Road Bridge
- Nebraska City Bridge
- Nine Bridges Bridge
- Plattsmouth Bridge, Plattsmouth, Nebraska
- Prairie Dog Creek Bridge
- Rulo Rail Bridge
- Saddle Creek Underpass
- Sargent Bridge
- Siouxland Veterans Memorial Bridge
- South Omaha Veterans Memorial Bridge
- Twin Bridge
- Union Pacific Missouri River Bridge
- Vermillion-Newcastle Bridge

=== See also ===
- List of bridges documented by the Historic American Engineering Record in Nebraska
- List of bridges on the National Register of Historic Places in Nebraska

== Nevada ==
- Galena Creek Bridge (Reno, Nevada)
- Humboldt River Bridge
- Mike O'Callaghan–Pat Tillman Memorial Bridge (Nevada–Arizona state line)
- Virginia Street Bridge

== New Hampshire ==
- Arch Bridge, North Walpole to Bellows Falls, Vermont
- Blair Bridge, Campton
- Columbia Bridge, Columbia to Lemington, Vermont
- Cornish–Windsor Covered Bridge, Cornish to Windsor, Vermont
- Hampton Bridge, Hampton Beach to Seabrook
- Janice Peaslee Bridge, Stratford to Maidstone, Vermont
- Ledyard Bridge, Hanover to Norwich, Vermont
- Little Bay Bridge, Newington to Dover
- Memorial Bridge, Portsmouth to Kittery, Maine
- Mount Orne Covered Bridge, Lancaster to Lunenburg, Vermont
- Piscataqua River Bridge, Portsmouth to Kittery, Maine
- Pittsburg–Clarksville Covered Bridge
- Sarah Mildred Long Bridge, Portsmouth to Kittery, Maine
- United States Navy Seabees Bridge, Chesterfield to Brattleboro, Vermont

=== See also ===
- List of bridges documented by the Historic American Engineering Record in New Hampshire
- List of bridges on the National Register of Historic Places in New Hampshire
- List of crossings of the Connecticut River
- List of New Hampshire covered bridges
- List of waterways forming and crossings of the Atlantic Intracoastal Waterway

== New Jersey ==
- Basilone Bridge, Edison Township to New Brunswick
- Bayonne Bridge, Bayonne to Staten Island, New York
- Belleville Turnpike Bridge, Belleville, Kearny, and North Arlington
- Benjamin Franklin Bridge, Camden to Philadelphia, Pennsylvania
- Betsy Ross Bridge, Pennsauken to Philadelphia, Pennsylvania
- Burlington-Bristol Bridge, Burlington to Bristol, Pennsylvania
- Commodore Barry Bridge, Bridgeport to Chester, Pennsylvania
- CRRNJ Newark Bay Bridge, Elizabeth to Bayonne
- Delair Bridge, Pennsauken Township to Philadelphia, Pennsylvania
- Delaware Memorial Bridge, Pennsville to New Castle, Delaware
- Delaware River Viaduct, Columbia to Portland, Pennsylvania
- Delaware Water Gap Toll Bridge, Hardwick Township to Delaware Water Gap, Pennsylvania
- Dingman's Ferry Bridge, Sandyston Township and Delaware Township, Pike County, Pennsylvania
- Driscoll Bridge, Woodbridge Township to Sayreville
- Edison Bridge, Woodbridge Township to Sayreville
- George Washington Bridge, Fort Lee to Manhattan
- Goethals Bridge, Elizabeth to Staten Island, New York
- Great Egg Harbor Bridge, Cape May County to Atlantic County via Garden State Parkway
- Jackson Street Bridge, Newark and Harrison
- Lower Hack Lift, Kearny to Jersey City
- Milford–Montague Toll Bridge, Montague Township to Milford Township, Bucks County, Pennsylvania
- Morrisville–Trenton Railroad Bridge, Trenton to Morrisville, Bucks County, Pennsylvania
- New Hope – Lambertville Toll Bridge, Lambertville to New Hope, Pennsylvania
- Newark Bay Bridge, Newark to Jersey City
- Northampton Street Bridge, Phillipsburg to Easton, Pennsylvania
- Outerbridge Crossing, Perth Amboy to Staten Island, New York
- PATH Lift Bridge, Kearny to Jersey City
- Portland-Columbia Toll Bridge, Columbia to Portland, Pennsylvania
- Pulaski Skyway, Newark to Jersey City
- Riegelsville Bridge, Riegelsville to Riegelsville, Pennsylvania
- Riverside-Delanco Bridge, Riverside to Delanco
- Tacony-Palmyra Bridge, Palmyra to the Tacony section of Philadelphia, Pennsylvania
- Trenton-Morrisville Toll Bridge, Trenton to Morrisville, Bucks County, Pennsylvania
- Walt Whitman Bridge, Gloucester City to Philadelphia, Pennsylvania
- West Trenton Railroad Bridge, Ewing Township to Yardley, Pennsylvania
- William A. Stickel Memorial Bridge, Newark to Harrison

=== See also ===
- List of bridges documented by the Historic American Engineering Record in New Jersey
- List of bridges on the National Register of Historic Places in New Jersey
- List of bridges, tunnels, and cuts in Hudson County, New Jersey
- List of crossings of the Delaware River
- List of crossings of the Hackensack River
- List of crossings of the Lower Passaic River
- List of crossings of the Upper Passaic River
- List of crossings of the Raritan River
- List of waterways forming and crossings of the Atlantic Intracoastal Waterway

== New Mexico ==
- John Dunn Bridge, Arroyo Hondo, New Mexico
- Rio Grande Gorge Bridge, Taos, New Mexico
- Rio Puerco Bridge

=== See also ===
- List of bridges documented by the Historic American Engineering Record in New Mexico
- List of bridges on the National Register of Historic Places in New Mexico

== New York ==
- 112th Street Bridge, Cohoes
- 145th Street Bridge, New York City
- Alexander Hamilton Bridge, New York City
- Alfred H. Smith Memorial Bridge, Castleton-on-Hudson
- Arthur Kill Vertical Lift Bridge, New York City
- Atlantic Beach Bridge, Long Island
- Bayonne Bridge, New York City (Staten Island) to New Jersey
- Bear Mountain Bridge, Westchester County to Orange County
- Borden Avenue Bridge, New York City (Queens)
- Broadway Bridge, New York City (Manhattan)
- Bronx–Whitestone Bridge, New York City (Queens and the Bronx)
- Brooklyn Bridge, New York City (Manhattan and Brooklyn)
- Buffalo Skyway, Buffalo
- City Island Bridge, New York City (the Bronx)
- Collar City Bridge, Colonie to Troy
- Congress Street Bridge, Troy
- Cross Bay Veterans Memorial Bridge, New York City (Queens)
- Dunn Memorial Bridge, Rensselaer
- Frederick Douglass–Susan B. Anthony Memorial Bridge, Rochester
- Ford Bridge, Long Island (Southampton and Montauk)
- George Washington Bridge, New York City (Manhattan) to New Jersey
- Goethals Bridge, New York City (Staten Island) to New Jersey
- Green Island Bridge, Troy
- Greenpoint Avenue Bridge, New York City (Queens and Brooklyn)
- Hell Gate Bridge, New York City (Queens and the Bronx)
- Henry Hudson Bridge, New York City (Manhattan and the Bronx)
- High Bridge, New York City
- Hudson River Way, Albany
- Irondequoit Bay Bridge, Irondequoit to Webster
- Joseph P. Addabbo Memorial Bridge, New York City (Queens)
- Kingston–Rhinecliff Bridge, across the Hudson River
- Kosciuszko Bridge, New York City (Queens and Brooklyn)
- Lewiston–Queenston Bridge, Lewiston, New York to Queenston, Ontario, Canada
- Livingston Avenue Bridge, Albany
- Macombs Dam Bridge, New York City (Manhattan and the Bronx)
- Madison Avenue Bridge, New York City (Manhattan and the Bronx)
- Manhattan Bridge, New York City (Manhattan and Brooklyn)
- Marine Parkway–Gil Hodges Memorial Bridge, New York City (Queens and Brooklyn)
- Mechanicville Bridge, Mechanicville
- Menands Bridge, Menands
- Mid-Hudson Bridge, near Poughkeepsie
- Newburgh–Beacon Bridge, Newburgh
- North Grand Island Bridge, Grand Island to Niagara Falls
- Ogdensburg–Prescott International Bridge, Ogdensburg, New York to Johnstown, Ontario
- Old Blenheim Bridge, North Blenheim
- Outerbridge Crossing, New York City (Staten Island) to New Jersey
- Park Avenue Bridge, New York City (Manhattan and the Bronx)
- Patroon Island Bridge, Albany
- Peace Bridge, Buffalo to Fort Erie, Ontario, Canada
- Pelham Bridge, New York City (the Bronx)
- Ponquogue Bridge, Long Island
- Poughkeepsie Bridge, Poughkeepsie
- Pulaski Bridge, New York City (Queens and Brooklyn)
- Queensboro Bridge, New York City (Manhattan and Queens)
- Rainbow Bridge, Niagara Falls, New York to Niagara Falls, Ontario, Canada
- Rexford Bridge, Rexford
- Rikers Island Bridge, New York City
- Rip Van Winkle Bridge, Catskill
- Robert Moses Causeway, Long Island
- Roebling's Delaware Aqueduct, Minisink Ford
- Roosevelt Island Bridge, New York City (Roosevelt Island and Queens)
- Schuylerville Bridge, Schuylerville
- South Grand Island Bridge, Grand Island to Buffalo
- Spuyten Duyvil Bridge, New York City (Manhattan and the Bronx)
- Tappan Zee Bridge, Rockland County and Westchester County
- Thaddeus Kosciusko Bridge, Albany
- Third Avenue Bridge, New York City
- Thousand Islands Bridge, to Ontario, Canada
- Throgs Neck Bridge, New York City (Queens and the Bronx)
- Triborough Bridge, New York City (Queens, Manhattan, and the Bronx)
- Troy–Waterford Bridge, Waterford
- University Heights Bridge, New York City (Manhattan and the Bronx)
- Verrazzano–Narrows Bridge, New York City (Brooklyn and Staten Island)
- Wards Island Bridge, New York City (Manhattan and the Bronx)
- Washington Bridge, New York City (Manhattan and the Bronx)
- Whirlpool Rapids Bridge, Niagara Falls, New York to Niagara Falls, Ontario, Canada
- Williamsburg Bridge, New York City (Manhattan and Brooklyn)
- Willis Avenue Bridge, New York City (Manhattan and the Bronx)

=== See also ===
- List of bridges documented by the Historic American Engineering Record in New York (state)
- List of bridges on the National Register of Historic Places in New York
- List of crossings of the Delaware River
- List of crossings of the Genesee River
- List of crossings of the Harlem River
- List of crossings of the Hudson River
- List of fixed crossings of the East River
- List of New York covered bridges
- List of waterways forming and crossings of the Atlantic Intracoastal Waterway
- List of bridges and tunnels in New York City

== North Carolina ==
- Cape Fear Memorial Bridge, Wilmington
- Herbert C. Bonner Bridge, Dare County
- Laurel Creek Gorge Bridge, Mars Hill
- Linn Cove Viaduct, Grandfather Mountain
- Pisgah Covered Bridge, Randolph County
- R. Kelly Bryant Jr. Pedestrian Bridge, Durham
- Settle's Bridge, Rockingham County
- Virginia Dare Memorial Bridge, Manteo
- William B. Umstead Bridge, Manteo
- Wright Memorial Bridge, Dare County

=== See also ===
- List of bridges documented by the Historic American Engineering Record in North Carolina
- List of bridges on the National Register of Historic Places in North Carolina
- List of waterways forming and crossings of the Atlantic Intracoastal Waterway

== North Dakota ==
- Beaver Creek Bridge
- Blanchard Bridge
- Caledonia Bridge
- Cedar Creek Bridge
- Colton's Crossing Bridge
- Crystal Bridge
- Eastwood Park Bridge
- Elliott Bridge
- Fairview Lift Bridge
- Fargo-Moorhead Toll Bridge
- Four Bears Bridge
- Goose River Bridge
- Grace City Bridge
- Great Northern Railway Underpass
- Hi-Line Railroad Bridge
- Knife River Bridge near Stanton
- Liberty Memorial Bridge
- Lisbon Bridge
- Lost Bridge
- Midland Continental Overpass
- Midway Bridge
- Nesheim Bridge
- New Rockford Bridge
- Northwood Bridge
- Norway Bridge
- Ost Valle Bridge
- Porter Elliott Bridge
- Portland Park Bridge
- Rainbow Arch Bridge
- Romness Bridge
- Sorlie Memorial Bridge, Grand Forks
- Viking Bridge
- West Antelope Bridge
- West Park Bridge
- Westgaard Bridge

=== See also ===
- List of bridges documented by the Historic American Engineering Record in North Dakota
- List of bridges on the National Register of Historic Places in North Dakota

== Ohio ==
- Anthony Wayne Bridge, Toledo
- Carl Perkins Bridge, Portsmouth to Greenup County, Kentucky
- Charles Berry Bridge, Lorain
- Detroit-Superior Bridge (Veterans' Memorial Bridge), Cleveland
- George V. Voinovich Bridges, Cleveland
- Hope Memorial Bridge, Cleveland
- Innerbelt Bridge (demolished 2014), Cleveland
- Lofton Henderson Memorial Bridge, Lorain
- Valley View Bridge, Garfield Heights to Independence
- Jeremiah Morrow Bridge, Fort Ancient to Oregonia
- Lane Avenue Bridge, Columbus
- Main Avenue Bridge, Cleveland
- Silver Memorial Bridge, Gallipolis to Henderson, West Virginia
- Simon Kenton Memorial Bridge, Aberdeen to Maysville, Kentucky
- Smolen-Gulf Bridge, connects Ashtabula Township to Plymouth Township
- Thomas Alva Edison Memorial Bridge, Bay View to Marblehead
- US Grant Bridge, Portsmouth to Kentucky
- Veterans' Glass City Skyway, Toledo
- William H. Harsha Bridge, connects Aberdeen to Maysville, Kentucky
- Zanesville Y-Bridge, Y-shaped bridge, Zanesville

=== See also ===
- List of Ashtabula County covered bridges
- List of bridges documented by the Historic American Engineering Record in Ohio
- List of bridges on the National Register of Historic Places in Ohio
- List of crossings of the Ohio River
- List of Ohio covered bridges
- List of Madison County Covered Bridges
- Parke County Covered Bridges

== Oklahoma ==
- 11th Street Bridge
- Allen Williamson Bridge
- James C. Nance Memorial Bridge
- State Highway No. 78 Bridge at the Red River
- Wanette-Byars Bridge

=== See also ===
- List of bridges documented by the Historic American Engineering Record in Oklahoma
- List of bridges on the National Register of Historic Places in Oklahoma

== Oregon ==
- 82nd Drive Pedestrian Bridge, crosses the Clackamas River between Gladstone and Oregon City
- Abernethy Bridge, Oregon City
- Alsea Bay Bridge, Waldport
- Astoria-Megler Bridge, from Astoria to Megler, Washington
- Big Creek Bridge, Lane County
- Bridge of the Gods, Cascade Locks
- Broadway Bridge, Portland
- Bullards Bridge, Bandon
- Burlington Northern Railroad Bridge 5.1, Portland
- Burlington Northern Railroad Bridge 9.6, Portland to Vancouver, Washington
- Burnside Bridge, Portland
- Cape Creek Bridge, Lane County
- Center Street Bridge, Salem
- Conde McCullough Memorial Bridge, Coos Bay
- Crooked River High Bridge, Jefferson County
- Fremont Bridge, Portland
- Glenn L. Jackson Memorial Bridge, Portland to Vancouver, Washington
- Hawthorne Bridge, Portland
- Hayden Bridge, Alsea
- Hayden Bridge, Springfield
- Holcomb Creek Trestle, Helvetia
- Hood River Bridge, Hood River to White Salmon, Washington
- Interstate Bridge, Portland
- Isaac Lee Patterson Bridge, Gold Beach
- John McLoughlin Bridge, Oregon City
- Lake Oswego Railroad Bridge, Lake Oswego to Milwaukie
- Lewis and Clark Bridge, Rainier to Longview, Washington
- Lewis and Clark River Bridge, Clatsop County
- Marion Street Bridge, Salem
- Marquam Bridge, Portland
- Morrison Bridge, Portland
- New Youngs Bay Bridge, Astoria–Warrenton
- Old Youngs Bay Bridge, Astoria
- Oregon City Bridge, Oregon City to West Linn
- Oregon Slough Railroad Bridge, Portland
- Oregon Trunk Rail Bridge, Wasco County to Wishram, Washington
- Ross Island Bridge, Portland
- Sam Hill Memorial Bridge, Biggs Junction to Maryhill, Washington
- Sellwood Bridge, Portland
- St. Johns Bridge, Portland
- Steel Bridge, Portland
- Siuslaw River Bridge, Florence
- Ten Mile Creek Bridge, near Yachats
- The Dalles Bridge, The Dalles to Dallesport, Washington
- Tilikum Crossing, Portland
- Umpqua River Bridge, Reedsport
- Union Street Railroad Bridge, Salem
- Wapato Bridge (formerly Sauvie Island Bridge), Portland metropolitan area
- Yaquina Bay Bridge, Newport

=== See also ===
- List of bridges documented by the Historic American Engineering Record in Oregon
- List of bridges on the National Register of Historic Places in Oregon
- List of crossings of the Willamette River
- List of Oregon covered bridges

== Pennsylvania ==
- Adams Avenue Bridge, Philadelphia
- Albertus L. Meyers Bridge, Allentown
- B&O Railroad Bridge, Philadelphia
- Beaver Bridge, Beaver
- Bellbank Bridge, between Colerain Township and Upper Oxford Township
- Benjamin Franklin Bridge, Center City Philadelphia to Camden, New Jersey
- Betsy Ross Bridge, Northeast Philadelphia to New Jersey
- Burlington-Bristol Bridge, Bristol to Burlington, New Jersey
- Chestnut Street Bridge, Philadelphia
- Columbia Railroad Bridge, Philadelphia
- Commodore Barry Bridge, Chester to New Jersey
- Falls Bridge, Philadelphia
- Fort Duquesne Bridge, Pittsburgh
- Fort Pitt Bridge, Pittsburgh
- Frankford Avenue Bridge, Northeast Philadelphia
- Girard Avenue Bridge, Philadelphia
- Girard Point Bridge, Philadelphia
- Gray's Ferry Bridge, Philadelphia
- Hill to Hill Bridge, Bethlehem
- Holme Avenue Bridge, Philadelphia
- M. Harvey Taylor Memorial Bridge, Harrisburg
- Market Street Bridge, Harrisburg
- Mulberry Street Bridge, Harrisburg
- George C. Platt Bridge, Philadelphia
- Pennsylvania Railroad Old Bridge over Standing Stone Creek, Huntingdon
- Poquessing Creek Bridge, Philadelphia/Andalusia
- Schuylkill Arsenal Railroad Bridge, Philadelphia
- Sewickley Bridge, Sewickley
- Smithfield Street Bridge, Pittsburgh
- Starrucca Viaduct, Susquehanna County
- State Street Bridge, Harrisburg
- Strawberry Mansion Bridge, Philadelphia
- Susquehanna River Bridge, Harrisburg
- Tacony-Palmyra Bridge, Tacony, Philadelphia to Palmyra, New Jersey
- Thomas Mill Covered Bridge, Fairmount Park, Philadelphia
- Three Sisters Bridges, Pittsburgh
- Tunkhannock Viaduct, Nicholson
- University Avenue Bridge, Philadelphia
- Vine Street Expressway Bridge, Philadelphia
- Walnut Lane Bridge, Philadelphia
- Walnut Lane Memorial Bridge, Philadelphia
- Walnut Street Bridge, Harrisburg
- Walnut Street Bridge, Philadelphia
- Walt Whitman Bridge, South Philadelphia to Gloucester City, New Jersey
- Washington Crossing Bridge, Washington Crossing
- West End Bridge, Pittsburgh
- West River Drive Bridge, Philadelphia

=== See also ===
- List of bridges documented by the Historic American Engineering Record in Pennsylvania
- List of bridges on the National Register of Historic Places in Pennsylvania
- List of covered bridges in Lancaster County, Pennsylvania
- List of covered bridges of Bradford, Sullivan and Lycoming Counties
- Pittsburgh bridges
- List of crossings of the Allegheny River in Pennsylvania
- List of crossings of the Conestoga River
- List of crossings of the Delaware River
- List of crossings of the Monongahela River in Pennsylvania
- List of crossings of the Ohio River in Pennsylvania
- List of crossings of the Schuylkill River
- List of crossings of the Susquehanna River

== Rhode Island ==
- Claiborne Pell Newport Bridge, Newport
- Crawford Street Bridge, Providence
- Henderson Bridge, Providence
- Iway Bridge, Providence
- Jamestown Verrazzano Bridge, Jamestown
- Mount Hope Bridge, Bristol
- Point Street Bridge, Providence
- Sakonnet River Bridge, Tiverton
- Washington Bridge, Providence

=== See also ===
- List of bridges documented by the Historic American Engineering Record in Rhode Island
- List of bridges on the National Register of Historic Places in Rhode Island
- List of waterways forming and crossings of the Atlantic Intracoastal Waterway

== South Carolina ==
- Arthur Ravenel Jr. Bridge, Charleston to Mount Pleasant
- Campbells Covered Bridge, Gowensville
- Don N. Holt Bridge, Charleston to North Charleston
- Gervais Street Bridge, Lexington County, South Carolina to Richland County, South Carolina
- John P. Grace Memorial Bridge, Charleston to Mount Pleasant
- James B. Edwards Bridge, Charleston to Mount Pleasant
- Silas N. Pearman Bridge, Charleston to Mount Pleasant
- Waccamaw River Memorial Bridge, Conway

=== See also ===
- List of bridges documented by the Historic American Engineering Record in South Carolina
- List of bridges on the National Register of Historic Places in South Carolina
- List of waterways forming and crossings of the Atlantic Intracoastal Waterway

== South Dakota ==
- Capa Bridge
- Chamberlain Bridge
- Chief Standing Bear Memorial Bridge
- Discovery Bridge
- Eighth Street Bridge
- Lewis Bridge
- Meridian Highway Bridge
- Miller Ree Creek Bridge
- Old Cochrane Road Bridge
- Old Redwater Bridge
- South Dakota Department of Transportation Bridge No. 02-007-220
- South Dakota Dept. of Transportation Bridge No. 20-153-210
- South Dakota Dept. of Transportation Bridge No. 30-257-400
- South Dakota Dept. of Transportation Bridge No. 48-244-204
- South Dakota Dept. of Transportation Bridge No. 49-095-190
- South Dakota Highway 44 Bridge, 14 miles west of Platte. The longest bridge in South Dakota
- Stamford Bridge
- Vermillion-Newcastle Bridge

=== See also ===
- List of bridges documented by the Historic American Engineering Record in South Dakota
- List of bridges on the National Register of Historic Places in South Dakota

== Tennessee ==
- Frisco Bridge, Memphis
- Gay Street Bridge, Knoxville
- Harahan Bridge, Memphis
- Henley Street Bridge, Knoxville
- Hernando de Soto Bridge, Memphis
- Holman J. Walker Bridge, Marion County
- Jimmy Mann Evans Bridge, Benton–Humphries Counties
- Lyle H. Fulton Memorial Bridge, Nashville
- Marion Memorial Bridge, Marion County
- Mark Anthony Walker Bridge, Tipton–Lauderdale Counties
- Market Street Bridge, or John Ross Bridge, Chattanooga
- Memphis & Arkansas Bridge, Memphis
- Natchez Trace Parkway Bridge, Williamson County
- Olgiati Bridge, Chattanooga
- Shelby Reinhart Bridge, Marion County
- Shelby Street Bridge, Nashville
- Silliman Evans Bridge, Nashville
- Tenbridge, Chattanooga
- Tri-County Veterans Bridge, Rhea–Meigs Counties
- Veterans Memorial Bridge, Chattanooga
- Walnut Street Bridge, Chattanooga

=== See also ===
- List of bridges documented by the Historic American Engineering Record in Tennessee
- List of bridges on the National Register of Historic Places in Tennessee
- List of crossings of the Tennessee River
- List of dams and reservoirs of the Tennessee River

== Texas ==
- Anzalduas International Bridge, Mission, Texas to Reynosa, Tamaulipas
- Bridge of the Americas, El Paso to Ciudad Juárez, Chihuahua
- Brownsville & Matamoros International Bridge, Brownsville to Matamoros, Tamaulipas, crosses Rio Grande and United States–Mexico border
- Camino Real International Bridge, Eagle Pass to Piedras Negras, Coahuila
- Colombia-Solidarity International Bridge, Laredo to Colombia, Nuevo León, crosses Rio Grande and United States–Mexico border
- Colorado River Bridge, Bastrop
- Continental Avenue Bridge, Dallas
- Corpus Christi Harbor Bridge, Corpus Christi
- Del Río-Ciudad Acuña International Bridge, Del Rio to Ciudad Acuña, Coahuila
- Eagle Pass-Piedras Negras International Bridge, Eagle Pass to Piedras Negras, Coahuila
- Fabens-Caseta International Bridge, Tornillo, Texas to Guadalupe, Chihuahua
- Fort Hancock-El Porvenir International Bridge, Fort Hancock to El Porvenir, Chihuahua
- Fred Hartman Bridge, Baytown and La Porte, crosses the Houston Ship Channel
- Free Trade International Bridge, crosses Rio Grande from Los Indios, Texas to Matamoros, Tamaulipas
- Galveston Causeway, crosses West Bay to Galveston Island
- Gateway International Bridge, Brownsville to Matamoros, Tamaulipas, crosses Rio Grande and United States–Mexico border
- Gateway to the Americas International Bridge, Laredo to Nuevo Laredo, Tamaulipas, crosses Rio Grande and United States–Mexico border
- Good Neighbor International Bridge, South Mesa Street, El Paso, to Ciudad Juárez, Chihuahua
- Juárez-Lincoln International Bridge, Laredo to Nuevo Laredo, Tamaulipas, crosses Rio Grande and United States–Mexico border
- La Linda International Bridge (Gerstaker Bridge), Heath Canyon to La Linda, Coahuila (The bridge was shut down in 1997)
- Lake Amistad Dam International Crossing, Del Rio to Ciudad Acuña, Coahuila
- Lake Falcon Dam International Crossing, Falcon Heights to Nueva Ciudad Guerrero, Tamaulipas
- Lewisville Lake Toll Bridge, Denton County, crossing Lewisville Lake
- Margaret Hunt Hill Bridge, Dallas, Texas
- Margaret McDermott Bridge, Dallas
- Martin Luther King Bridge, Port Arthur
- McAllen-Hidalgo-Reynosa International Bridge, McAllen and Hidalgo to Reynosa, Tamaulipas
- Mountain Creek Lake Bridge, Dallas County
- Northaven Trail Bridge, Dallas, Texas
- Paso del Norte International Bridge, Santa Fe Street, El Paso, Texas to Ciudad Juárez, Chihuahua
- Pennybacker Bridge, Austin
- Pharr-Reynosa International Bridge, Pharr to Reynosa, Tamaulipas
- Presidio-Ojinaga International Bridge, Presidio to Ojinaga, Chihuahua
- Progreso-Nuevo Progreso International Bridge, Progreso to Nuevo Progreso, Tamaulipas
- Rainbow Bridge, Port Arthur to Bridge City
- Regency Bridge, crosses the Colorado River in Mills County
- Rio Grande City-Camargo International Bridge, Rio Grande City to Ciudad Camargo, Tamaulipas
- Roma-Ciudad Miguel Alemán International Bridge, Roma to Ciudad Miguel Alemán, Tamaulipas
- Sam Houston Ship Channel Bridge, Harris County, crosses the Houston Ship Channel
- Sidney Sherman Bridge, Houston, crosses the Houston Ship Channel
- Texas-Mexican Railway International Bridge, crosses the Rio Grande, connecting Laredo and Nuevo Laredo, Tamaulipas
- Union Pacific International Railroad Bridge, Eagle Pass to Piedras Negras, Coahuila
- Veteran's International Bridge, crosses the Rio Grande, Brownsville to Matamoros, Tamaulipas
- Waco Suspension Bridge, Waco
- World Trade International Bridge, crosses the Rio Grande, connects Laredo and Nuevo Laredo, Tamaulipas
- Ysleta-Zaragoza International Bridge, Zaragosa Street, El Paso to Ciudad Juárez, Chihuahua

=== See also ===
- List of bridges documented by the Historic American Engineering Record in Texas
- List of bridges on the National Register of Historic Places in Texas

== Utah ==
- Cable Creek Bridge
- Dewey Bridge (Utah)
- Hite Crossing Bridge
- Lincoln Highway Bridge
- Murphy Trail and Bridge
- Rockville Bridge
- Sam White Bridge
- San Rafael Bridge
- U.S. Route 191 Bridge over the Colorado River adjacent to Arches National Park

=== See also ===
- List of bridges documented by the Historic American Engineering Record in Utah
- List of bridges on the National Register of Historic Places in Utah

== Vermont ==
- Bridge 12
- Brookline-Newfane Bridge
- Browns River Covered Bridge
- Burt Henry Covered Bridge, Bennington
- Champlain Bridge, Addison to Crown Point, New York
- Cheshire Bridge
- Colburn Bridge
- Cold River Bridge
- Creamery Covered Bridge
- Fisher Covered Railroad Bridge
- Hall Covered Bridge
- Medburyville Bridge
- Museum Covered Bridge
- Rice Farm Road Bridge
- Sacketts Brook Stone Arch Bridge
- Scott Covered Bridge
- Simpsonville Stone Arch Bridge
- South Newfane Bridge
- Spade Farm Covered Bridge
- Taylor Street Bridge
- West Townshend Stone Arch Bridge
- Williams River Route 5 Bridge
- Williamsville Covered Bridge
- Worrall Covered Bridge

=== See also ===
- List of bridges documented by the Historic American Engineering Record in Vermont
- List of bridges on the National Register of Historic Places in Vermont
- List of crossings of the Connecticut River
- List of covered bridges in Vermont
- List of non-authentic covered bridges in Vermont

== Virginia ==
- 14th Street Bridge, I-395 and US 1 across Potomac River between Arlington County and Washington, D.C.
- Berkley Bridge, I-264 across Elizabeth River in Norfolk
- Boulevard Bridge, VA 161 toll bridge across James River in Richmond
- Charles Hardaway Marks Bridges, VA 10 across Appomattox River near Hopewell
- Chesapeake Bay Bridge-Tunnel, US 13 between Virginia Beach and Eastern Shore
- Edward E. Willey Bridge, VA 150 across James River between Henrico County and Richmond
- George P. Coleman Memorial Bridge, US 17 across York River between Yorktown, Virginia and Gloucester County
- Governor Harry W. Nice Memorial Bridge, US 301 across Potomac River between Dahlgren and Maryland
- Hampton Roads Bridge-Tunnel, I-64 and US 60 between Norfolk and Hampton
- Huguenot Memorial Bridge, VA 147 across James River between Henrico County and Richmond
- James River Bridge, I-95 in Richmond
- James River Bridge, US 17 across James River between Isle of Wight County and Newport News
- Manchester Bridge, US 60 across James River in Richmond
- Martin Luther King Jr. Memorial Bridge, US 1 and US 301 across Appomattox River between Colonial Heights and Petersburg
- Mayo Bridge, US 360 across James River in Richmond
- Monitor–Merrimac Memorial Bridge–Tunnel, I-664 across Hampton Roads between Suffolk and Newport News
- Peninsula Subdivision Trestle, CSX Transportation Peninsula Subdivision in Richmond
- Powhite Parkway Bridge, VA 76 toll bridge across James River in Richmond
- Rivanna Subdivision Trestle, CSX Transportation Rivanna Subdivision in Richmond
- Robert E. Lee Memorial Bridge, US 1 and US 301 across James River in Richmond
- Theodore Roosevelt Bridge, I-66 and US 50 across Potomac River between Arlington County and Washington, D.C.
- Varina-Enon Bridge, I-295 across James River between Henrico and Chesterfield counties
- Vietnam Veterans Memorial Bridge, VA 895 toll bridge across James River between Richmond and Henrico County
- Wilson Creek Bridge a.k.a. the Smart Road Bridge, Montgomery County
- Woodrow Wilson Bridge, I-95 and I-495 across Potomac River from Alexandria through Washington, D.C. to Maryland
- World War II Veterans Memorial Bridge, VA-288 across James River between Powhatan and Goochland counties

=== See also ===
- List of bridges documented by the Historic American Engineering Record in Virginia
- List of bridges on the National Register of Historic Places in Virginia
- List of crossings of the Potomac River
- List of Virginia covered bridges
- List of waterways forming and crossings of the Atlantic Intracoastal Waterway

== Washington ==
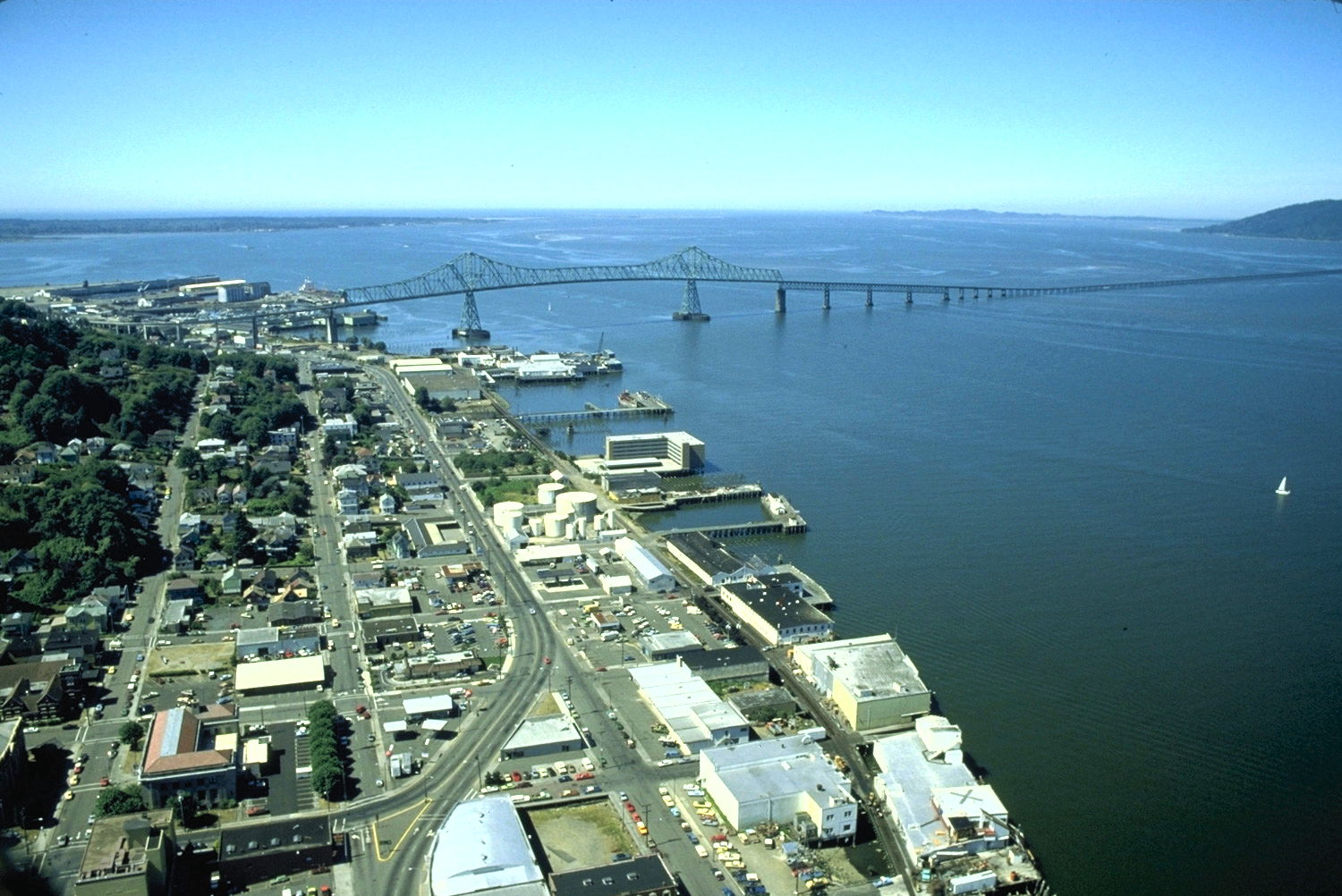
Astoria-Megler Bridge

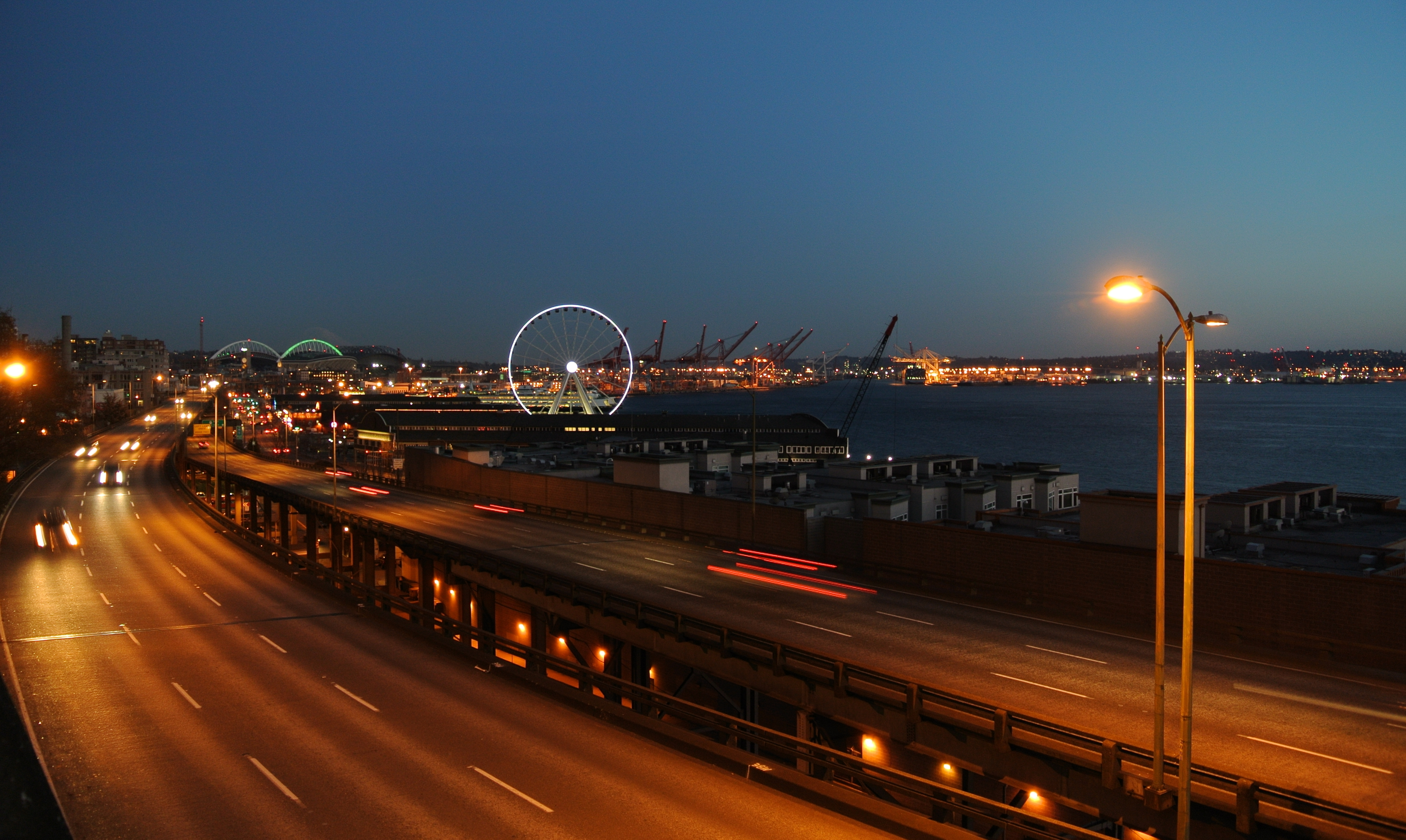
Alaskan Way Viaduct

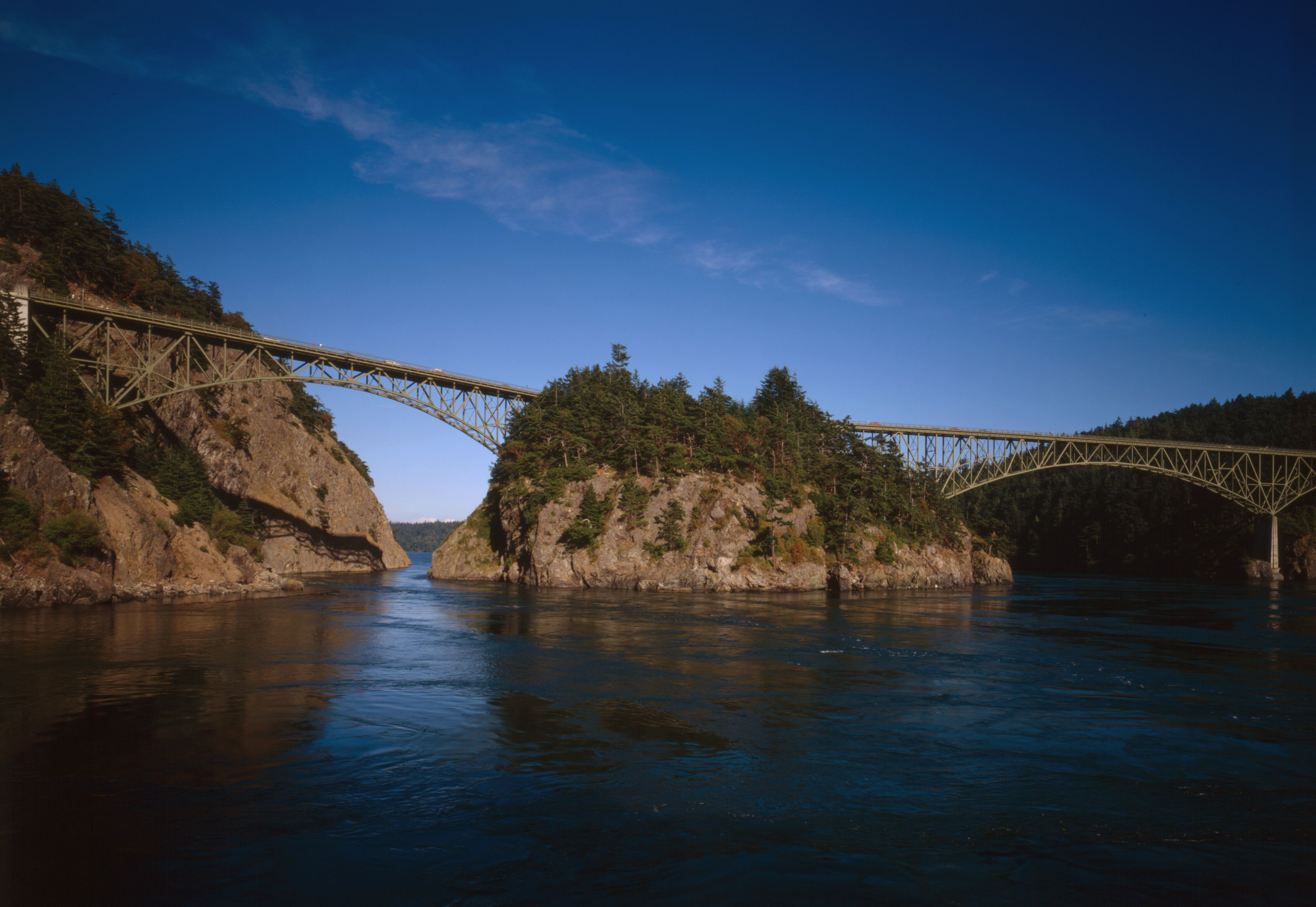
Canoe Pass and Deception Pass Bridge Bridges

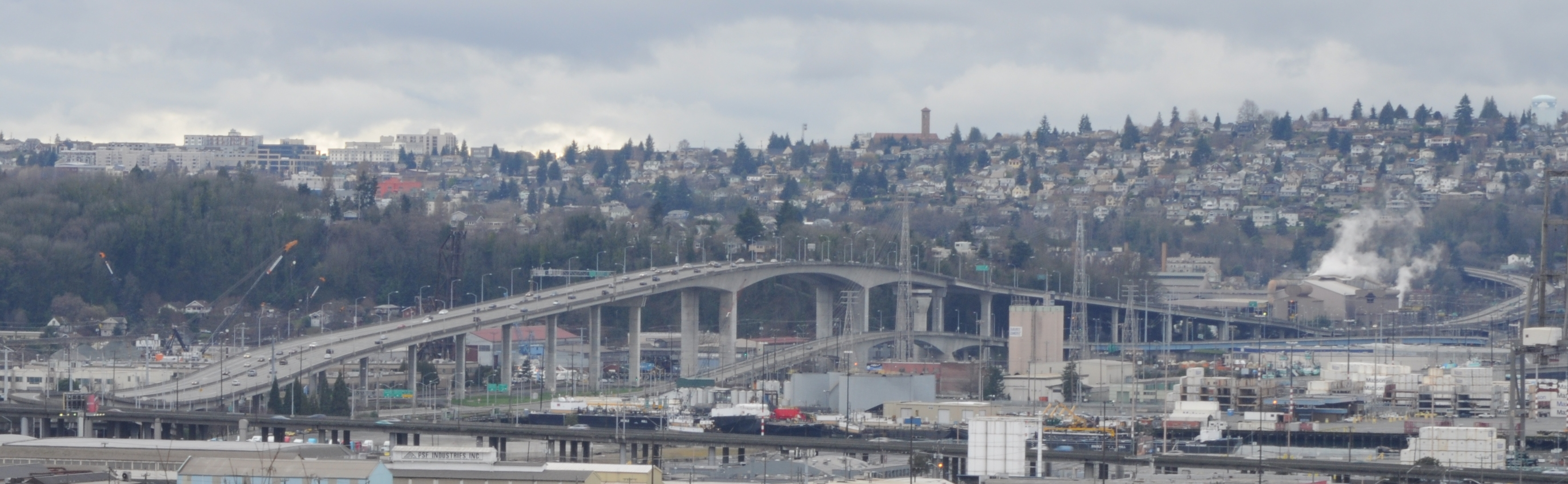
West Seattle Bridge

- 20th Avenue NE Bridge, Seattle
- Agate Pass Bridge, Suquamish
- Alaskan Way Viaduct, Seattle
- Arboretum Sewer Trestle, Seattle
- Astoria-Megler Bridge, Megler to Astoria, Oregon
- Ballard Bridge, Seattle
- Beebe Bridge, Chelan
- Benton City-Kiona Bridge, Kiona
- Beverly Railroad Bridge, Beverly
- Blue Bridge (Pioneer Memorial Bridge), Kennewick to Pasco
- Bridge of the Gods, Fort Rains to Cascade Locks, Oregon
- Burlington Northern Railroad Bridge 9.6, Vancouver (Washington) to Portland, Oregon
- Cable Bridge (Ed Hendler Bridge), Kennewick to Pasco
- Christine Falls Bridge, Paradise
- Cowen Park Bridge, Seattle
- Curlew Bridge, Curlew
- Deception Pass Bridge, Whidbey Island to Fidalgo Island
- Dodger Point Bridge, Elwha Valley
- Dungeness River Bridge, Sequim
- Evergreen Point Floating Bridge, Seattle
- East 21st Street Bridge, Tacoma
- East 34th Street Bridge, Tacoma
- East Channel Bridge, Seattle
- Elwha River Bridge, Elwha
- Fairfax Bridge, Melmont
- First Avenue South Bridge, Seattle
- Fred G. Redmon Bridge, Yakima
- Fremont Bridge, Seattle
- George Washington Memorial Bridge, Seattle
- Glenn L. Jackson Memorial Bridge, Vancouver to Portland, Oregon
- Grays River Covered Bridge, Wahkiakum County
- Grand Coulee Bridge
- High Steel Bridge, Mason County
- Homer M. Hadley Memorial Bridge (Third Lake Washington Bridge), Seattle
- Hood Canal Bridge, Kitsap County
- Hood River Bridge, White Salmon to Hood River, Oregon
- Interstate Bridge, Vancouver to Portland, Oregon
- Interstate 182 Bridge, Richland to Pasco
- Julia Butler Hansen Bridge, Cathlamet
- Jose Rizal Bridge, Seattle
- Kettle Falls Bridges, Kettle Falls
- Lacey V. Murrow Memorial Bridge, Seattle to Mercer Island
- Lewis and Clark Bridge (Columbia River), Longview
- Magnolia Bridge, Seattle
- Manette Bridge, Bremerton
- Mark Clark Bridge, Stanwood
- McMillin Bridge
- Montlake Bridge, Seattle
- Monroe Street Bridge, Spokane
- Murray Morgan Bridge, Tacoma
- Narada Falls Bridge, Paradise
- North Queen Anne Drive Bridge, Seattle
- Oregon Trunk Rail Bridge, Wishram
- Pasco–Kennewick Bridge (1922) (demolished)
- Purdy Bridge, Purdy
- Rock Island Railroad Bridge, Rock Island
- Rosalia Railroad Bridge, Rosalia
- Salmon Bay Bridge, Seattle
- Sam Hill Memorial Bridge
- Schmitz Park Bridge, Seattle
- Ship Canal Bridge, Seattle
- Snake River Bridge, Lyons Ferry
- South Park Bridge, Seattle
- South Puyallup River Bridge, Nisqually Entrance
- St. Andrews Creek Bridge, Nisqually Entrance
- Spokane Street Bridge, Seattle
- Tacoma Narrows Bridge, Tacoma to Gig Harbor
- The Dalles Bridge, Dallesport to The Dalles, Oregon
- University Bridge, Seattle
- Umatilla Bridge
- Vantage Bridge, Vantage
- Vernita Bridge,
- West Seattle Bridge, Seattle
- Wilburton Trestle, Bellevue
- Winnifred Street Bridge, Ruston
- Yale Bridge, Yale

=== See also ===
- List of bridges documented by the Historic American Engineering Record in Washington (state)
- List of bridges on the National Register of Historic Places in Washington (state)
- List of crossings of the Columbia River

== West Virginia ==
- 35th Street Bridge, Charleston
- Alderson Bridge, Alderson
- B & O Railroad Potomac River Crossing, Harpers Ferry to Maryland Heights, Maryland
- Bellaire Bridge, Benwood to Bellaire, Ohio
- Blennerhassett Island Bridge, Parkersburg to Belpre, Ohio
- Bridgeport Bridge, Wheeling to Bridgeport, Ohio
- Carrollton Covered Bridge, Barbour County
- Clifford Hollow Bridge, Moorefield
- David Morgan Bridge, Fairmont
- East Huntington Bridge (East End Bridge), Huntington
- Fort Henry Bridge, Wheeling
- Hi Carpenter Memorial Bridge, St. Marys to Newport, Ohio
- Indian Creek Covered Bridge, Monroe County
- Interstate 470 Bridge, Wheeling to Bridgeport, Ohio
- Jennings Randolph Bridge, Chester to East Liverpool, Ohio
- Marietta–Williamstown Interstate Bridge, Williamstown to Marietta, Ohio
- Military Order of the Purple Heart Bridge, Wheeling Island to Bridgeport, Ohio
- Moundsville Bridge, Moundsville to Belmont County, Ohio
- New Martinsville Bridge, New Martinsville to Hannibal, Ohio
- New River Gorge Bridge, Fayetteville
- Parkersburg–Belpre Bridge, Parkersburg to Belpre, Ohio
- Philippi Covered Bridge, Philippi
- Point Pleasant Rail Bridge, Point Pleasant to Gallia County, Ohio
- Pomeroy–Mason Bridge, Mason to Pomeroy, Ohio
- Ravenswood Bridge, Ravenswood to Meigs County, Ohio
- Robert C. Byrd Bridge, Huntington to Chesapeake, Ohio
- Robert H. Mollohan-Jefferson Street Bridge, Fairmont
- Silver Bridge, Point Pleasant to Gallipolis, Ohio
- Silver Memorial Bridge, Henderson to Gallipolis, Ohio
- Star City Bridge, Star City
- Veterans Memorial Bridge, Weirton to Steubenville, Ohio
- West Huntington Bridge, Huntington
- Wheeling Suspension Bridge, Wheeling
- Williamstown Bridge, Williamstown to Marietta, Ohio

=== See also ===
- List of bridges documented by the Historic American Engineering Record in West Virginia
- List of bridges on the National Register of Historic Places in West Virginia
- List of crossings of the Potomac River
- List of West Virginia covered bridges

== Wisconsin ==
- Black Hawk Bridge, Crawford County to Lansing, Iowa
- Eagle Point Bridge, Grant County to Dubuque, Iowa
- Hoan Bridge, carries Interstate 794 over the Port of Milwaukee; Milwaukee
- John A. Blatnik Bridge, Superior to Duluth, MN
- Leo Frigo Memorial Bridge, carries Interstate 43 over the Fox River; Green Bay
- Richard I. Bong Memorial Bridge, Superior to Duluth, Minnesota
- Marquette-Joliet Bridge, Prairie du Chien to Marquette, Iowa
- Interstate Bridge, Marinette Wisconsin to Menominee, MI
- Sturgeon Bay Bridge, Sturgeon Bay

=== See also ===
- List of bridges documented by the Historic American Engineering Record in Wisconsin
- List of bridges on the National Register of Historic Places in Wisconsin
- List of crossings of the Mississippi River

== Wyoming ==
- AJX Bridge over South Fork and Powder River
- BMU Bridge over Wind River
- Chittenden Memorial Bridge
- CKW Bridge over Powder River
- CQA Four Mile Bridge
- Dale Creek Crossing
- DDZ Bridge over New Fork River
- DFU Elk Mountain Bridge
- DMJ Pick Bridge
- DML Butler Bridge
- DOE Bridge over Laramie River
- DSD Bridge over Cheyenne River
- DUX Bessemer Bend Bridge
- DXN Bridge
- EAU Arvada Bridge
- EBF Bridge over Powder River
- ECR Kooi Bridge
- ECS Bridge over Big Goose Creek
- EDL Peloux Bridge
- EDZ Irigary Bridge
- EFP Bridge over Owl Creek
- EJE Bridge over Shell Creek
- EJP County Line Bridge
- EJZ Bridge over Shoshone River
- ELS Bridge over Big Wind River
- ELY Wind River Diversion Dam Bridge
- ENP Bridge over Green River
- ERT Bridge over Black's Fork
- ETD Bridge over Green River
- ETR Big Island Bridge
- EWZ Bridge over East Channel of Laramie River
- Hayden Arch Bridge
- Rairden Bridge

=== See also ===
- List of bridges documented by the Historic American Engineering Record in Wyoming
- List of bridges on the National Register of Historic Places in Wyoming

== See also ==
- List of bridges
