= Tenbridge =

Railroad bridge in Chattanooga, Tennessee

Coordinates: 35.1045°N 85.2335°W

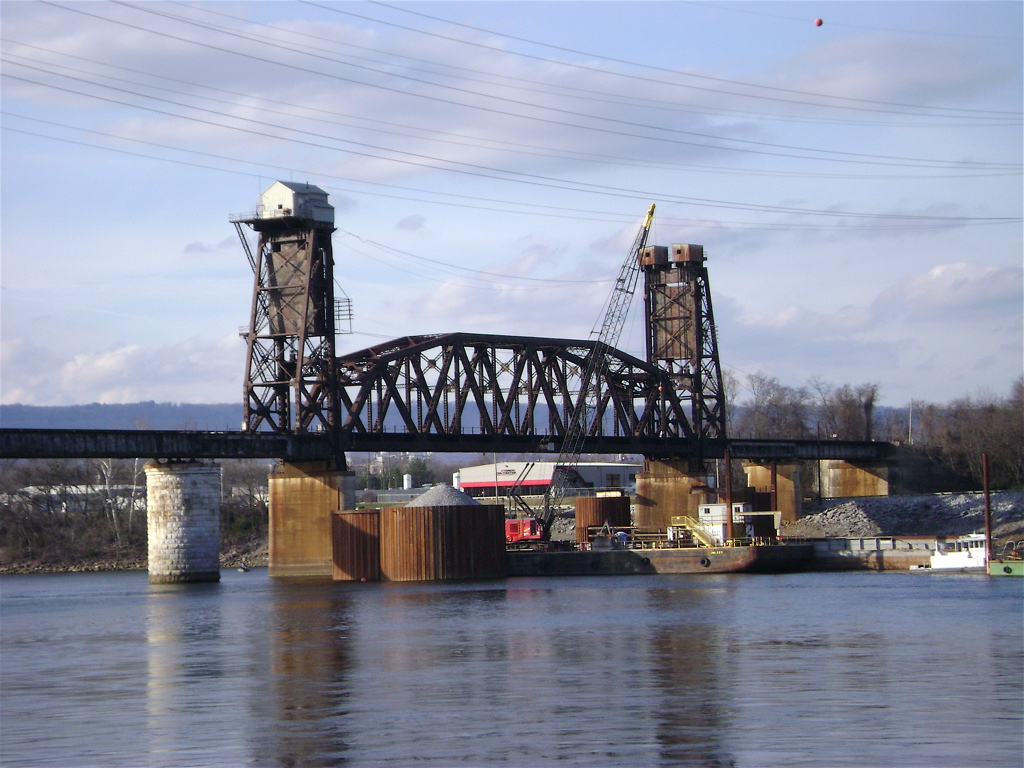
From the south shore looking north to Tenbridge below Chickamauga Lake dam (Nickajack Lake)

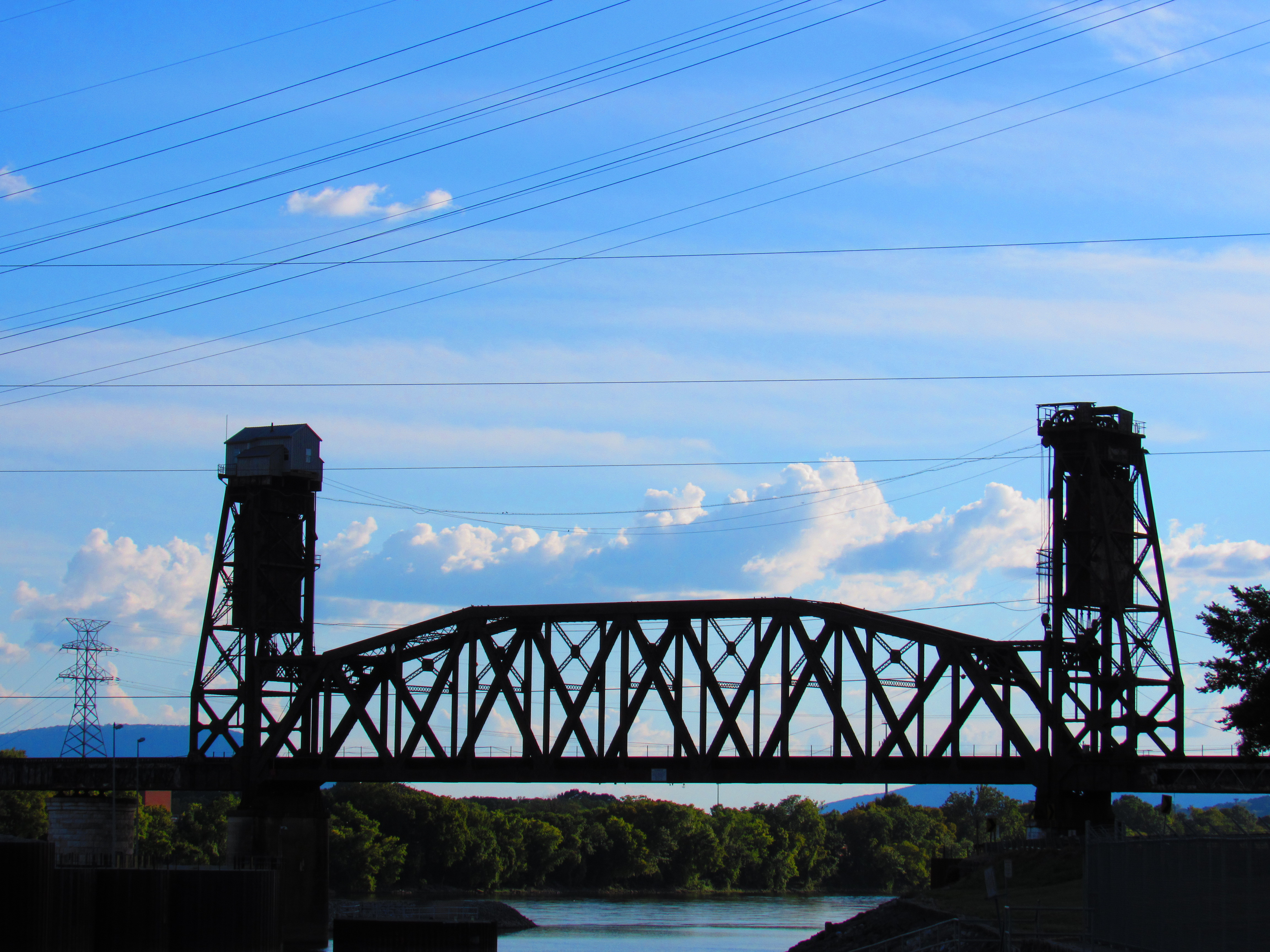
From the north shore just off N. Access Rd. looking Southwest.

Tenbridge is a vertical-lift railroad bridge over the Tennessee River in Chattanooga, Tennessee. It has a main span of 310 feet (94 m).

The original span was a swing span with a center pivot that was originally built in ca. 1879/1880. It was replaced by a vertical lift span in 1917, but the lift towers and machinery were not installed until 1920. It remains a very busy crossing on the Cincinnati, New Orleans and Texas Pacific Railway, a major subsidiary of the Norfolk Southern Railway. The bridge carries two mainline tracks across the river.

The bridge is one of only three known nesting locations in Tennessee for peregrine falcons, a Tennessee endangered species.

== Sources ==
- Walker, Alan (2003). Images of Rail: Railroads of Chattanooga. Charleston, South Carolina: Arcadia Publishing.
