= South Dakota Dept. of Transportation Bridge No. 49-095-190 =

- U.S. National Register of Historic Places
- Location within South Dakota Location within the United States
- Nearest city: Howard, South Dakota
- Coordinates: 43°55′19″N 97°39′35″W
- Area: less than one acre
- Built: 1917
- MPS: Historic Bridges in South Dakota MPS
- NRHP reference No.: 93001306
- Added to NRHP: December 9, 1993

South Dakota Dept. of Transportation Bridge No. 49-095-190 is a historic bridge in rural Miner County, South Dakota. It carries a local road over Rock Creek, about 6 miles (9.7 km) south and 6.5 miles (10.5 km) west of Howard. Built in 1917, it is the longest pre-1920 concrete slab bridge in the state. Bridges from this time predate the standardization in the methods and use of concrete in bridge construction, and are relatively rare. The bridge consists of a single span 27 feet (8.2 m) in length, with a solid concrete parapet as a railing. The concrete is suffering from spalling.

The bridge was listed on the National Register of Historic Places in 1993.

== See also ==
- List of bridges on the National Register of Historic Places in South Dakota
