= Coop Creek Bridge =

- U.S. National Register of Historic Places
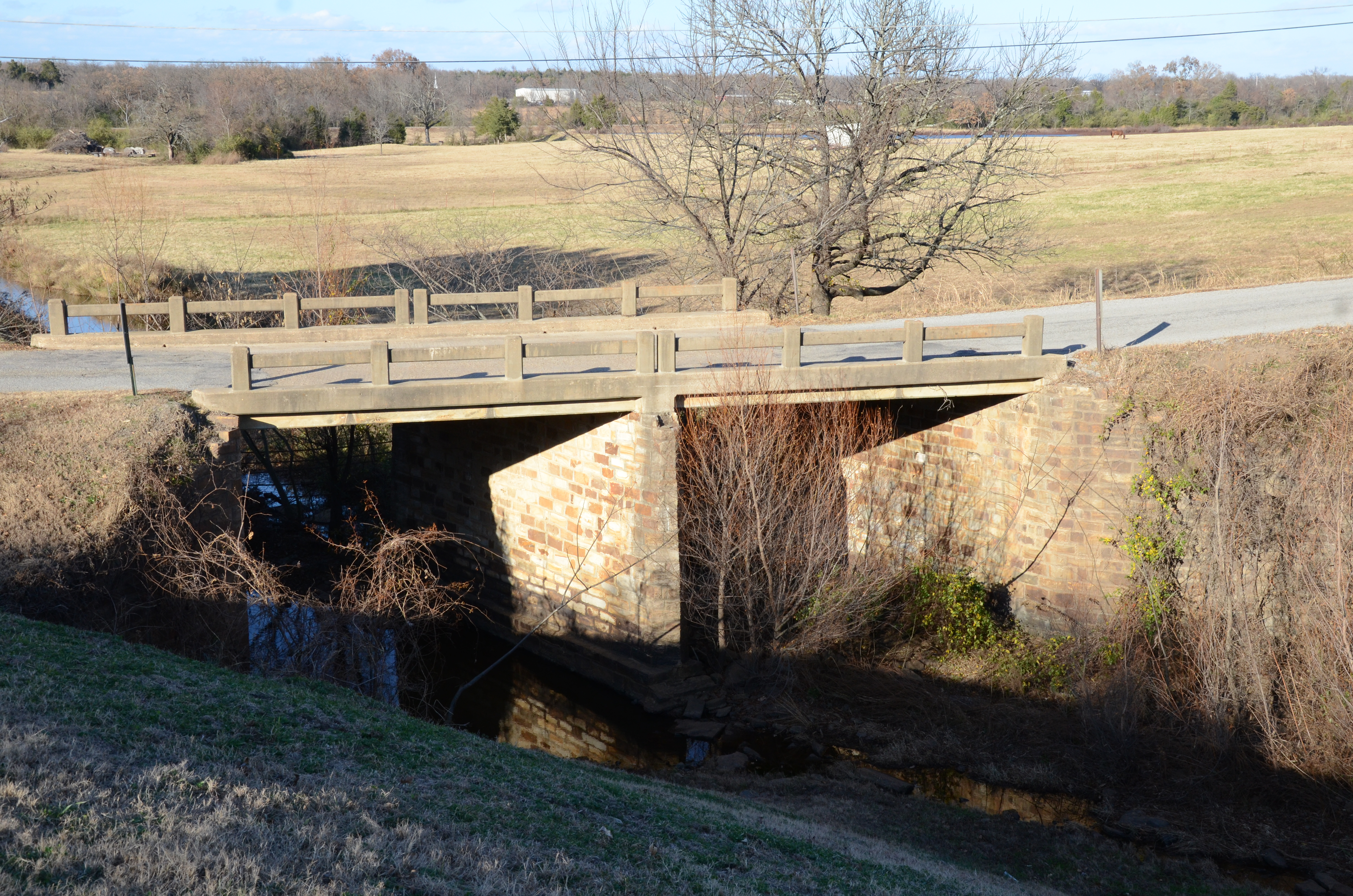

- Location within Arkansas Location within the United States
- Nearest city: Mansfield, Arkansas
- Coordinates: 35°3′27″N 94°14′10″W
- Area: less than one acre
- Built: 1940
- Architect: Works Progress Administration
- Architectural style: Open Masonry Substructure
- MPS: Historic Bridges of Arkansas MPS
- NRHP reference No.: 95000566
- Added to NRHP: May 5, 1995

The Coop Creek Bridge is a historic bridge in Sebastian County, Arkansas, just outside the city of Mansfield. It carries Broadway, designated County Route 62, across Coop Creek just north of Mansfield Lake. It is a two-span open masonry structure, with one span of 18 feet (5.5 m) and one of 21 feet (6.4 m), with a total structure length of 44 feet (13 m). The bridge is set on masonry abutments and piers, with a reinforced concrete deck that is lined by simple concrete railings. It is a well-preserved example of a masonry bridge built in 1940.

The bridge was listed on the National Register of Historic Places in 1995.

== See also ==
- National Register of Historic Places listings in Sebastian County, Arkansas
- List of bridges on the National Register of Historic Places in Arkansas
