= South Dakota Dept. of Transportation Bridge No. 20-153-210 =

- U.S. National Register of Historic Places
- Location within South Dakota Location within the United States
- Nearest city: Brandt, South Dakota
- Coordinates: 44°40′27″N 96°34′28″W
- Area: less than one acre
- Built: 1960
- Built by: Security Bridge Company
- Architectural style: Pratt pony truss
- MPS: Historic Bridges in South Dakota MPS
- NRHP reference No.: 93001286
- Added to NRHP: December 9, 1993

The South Dakota Dept. of Transportation Bridge No. 20-153-210 is a historic bridge in Deuel County, South Dakota. It carries 187th Street across Cobb Creek, about 2 miles (3.2 km) east of Brandt. It is a single-span Pratt pony truss bridge, 71 feet (22 m) in length, resting on steel pilings with metal wing walls. It has corrugated metal decking resting on I-beam stringers. The bridge was built in 1908, and was originally located at a site in Herrick Township. Moved to its present location in 1960, it is the only known surviving bridge in Deuel County built by the Security Bridge Company, which held county contracts for bridge construction between 1907 and 1913.

The bridge was listed on the National Register of Historic Places in 1993.

== See also ==
- List of bridges on the National Register of Historic Places in South Dakota
