= Blanchard Bridge =

Coordinates: 47.339768°N 97.216749°W

- Formerly listed on the U.S. National Register of Historic Places
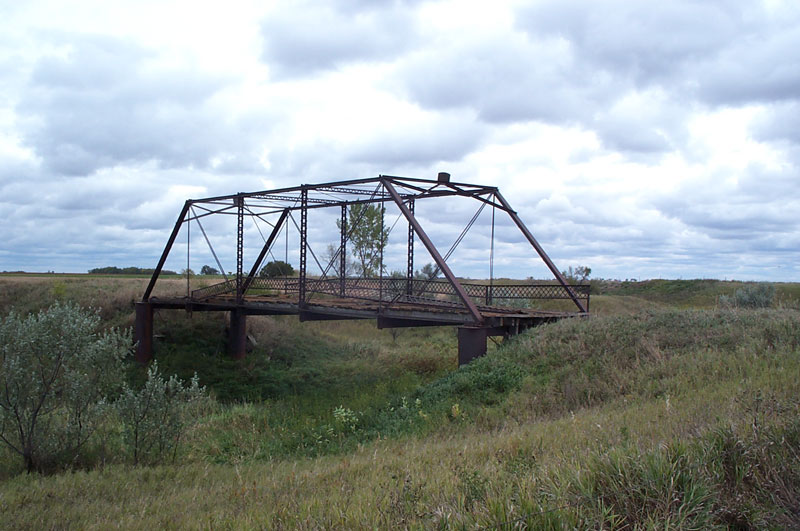

- Location within North Dakota Location within the United States
- Nearest city: Blanchard, North Dakota
- Area: less than one acre
- Built: 1900
- Built by: Dibley & Robinson
- Architectural style: Pratt through truss
- MPS: Historic Roadway Bridges of North Dakota MPS
- NRHP reference No.: 97000189

Significant dates
- Added to NRHP: February 2, 1997
- Removed from NRHP: March 25, 2009

The Blanchard Bridge, also known as Elm River Bridge, near Blanchard, North Dakota was a Pratt through truss structure that was built in 1900 by Dibley & Robinson. It was listed on the National Register of Historic Places in 1997. It was removed from the National Register in 2009.

The bridge was moved from its location in August 2007.

According to its nomination, it is significant "for its association with attempts by North Dakota counties to expand and improve transportation networks prior to 1926 by construction of through truss bridges, relatively costly structures. Through truss bridges with documented construction dates and builders, such as this one, best illustrate this important trend in North Dakota bridge construction."
