= Ross Creek Bridge =

Coordinates: 33.6062182°N 85.5888468°W

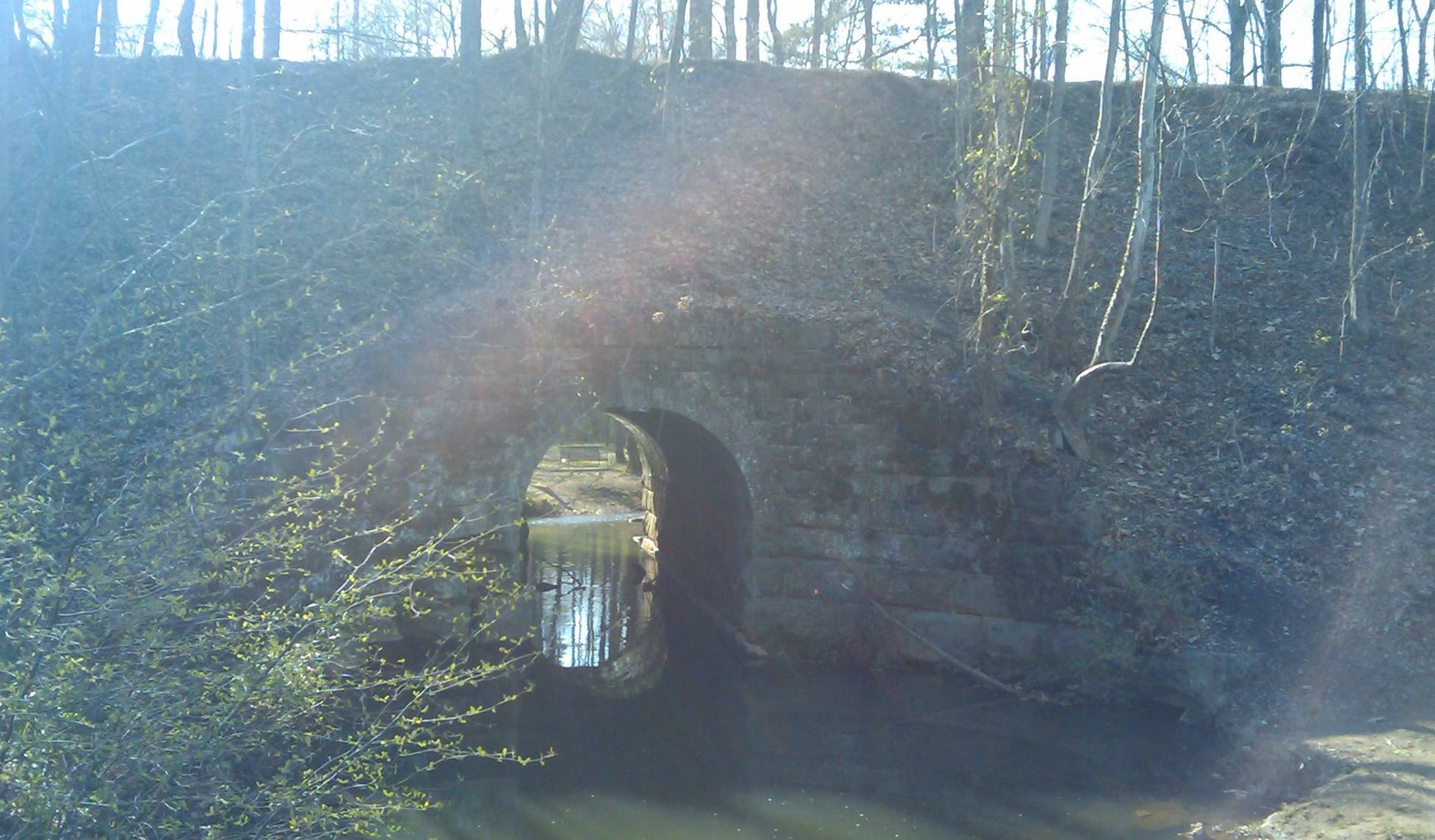
Ross Bridge.

Ross Creek Bridge is a former railway bridge, now used as a pedestrian walkway in Ross Bridge Park, Hoover, Alabama, United States. The text of the sign posted nearby by the Hoover Historical Society reads as follows:

In 1858 James Taylor Ross, a Scotchman migrated to the South, acquired land and homesteaded in what is now Shades Valley. He provided land for the construction of a Confederate railway, including a bridge spanning Ross Creek. After the Ross family moved westward, his property was purchased in 1907 by TCI, a predecessor of U.S. Steel. In 2002, U.S. Steel, Daniel Corp. and the Retirement Systems of Alabama combined to develop the community of Ross Bridge.
