= Lists of crossings of the Mississippi River =

This topic is split into two separate articles:

- List of crossings of the Upper Mississippi River – crossings north of the Ohio River
- List of crossings of the Lower Mississippi River – crossings south of the Ohio River
