= 82nd Drive Pedestrian Bridge =

Pedestrian bridge in the U.S. state of Oregon

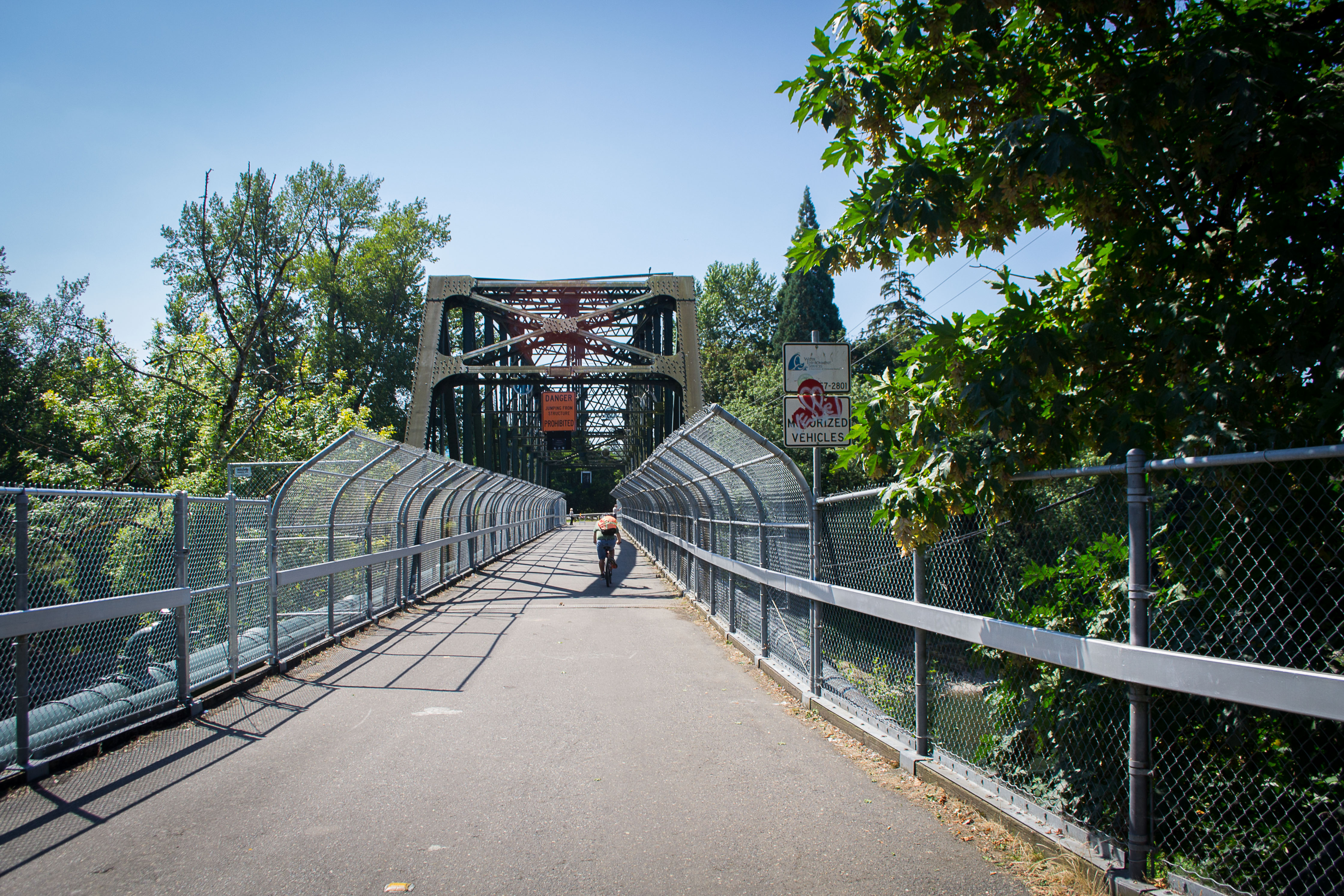
- The bridge in 2013
- Coordinates: 45°22′43″N 122°35′3″W
- Crosses: Clackamas River
- Locale: Oregon, United States

The 82nd Drive Pedestrian Bridge is a pedestrian bridge connecting Gladstone and Oregon City in the U.S. state of Oregon. The bridge has been owned and maintained by the Clackamas Water Environment Services since 1998.

== History ==
The bridge was closed temporarily in 2017 for "assessment and inspection". It underwent seismic retrofitting in 2019 and reopened in 2020.
