= Bridge (Stratton, Nebraska) =

- U.S. National Register of Historic Places
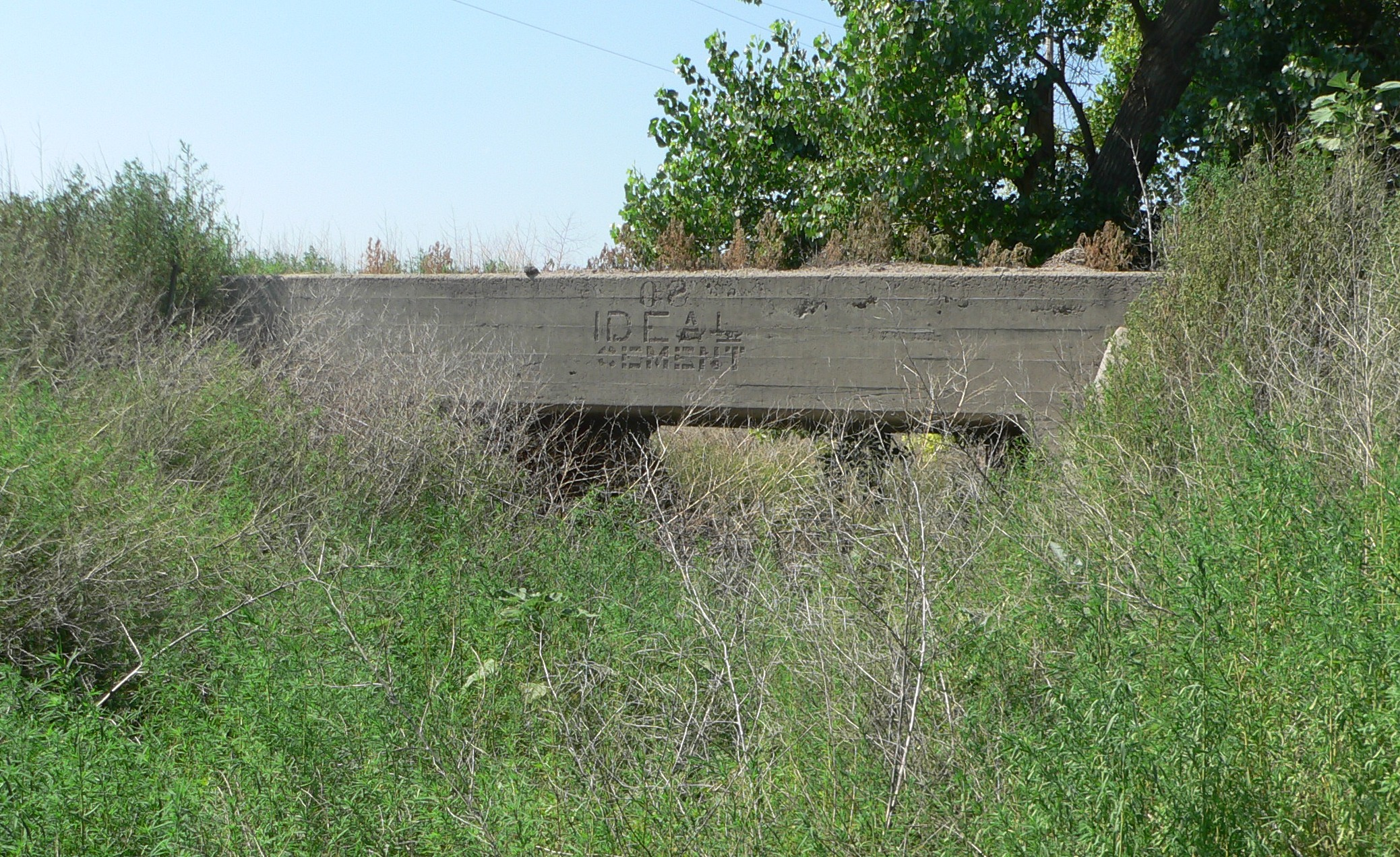

- Location within Nebraska Location within the United States
- Location: County road over an intermittent stream, 2 miles east of Stratton
- Nearest city: Stratton, Nebraska
- Coordinates: 40°9′7″N 101°11′29″W
- Area: less than one acre
- Built: 1908
- Built by: Ideal Cement Co.
- Architectural style: Reinforced concrete slab
- MPS: Highway Bridges in Nebraska MPS
- NRHP reference No.: 92000714
- Added to NRHP: June 29, 1992

The Bridge near Stratton, Nebraska is a historic bridge that is listed on the U.S. National Register of Historic Places.

It is a 20-foot (6.1 m) reinforced concrete slab bridge that was built in 1908 by the Ideal Cement Company. It is also denoted NEHBS No. HK00-78. It was listed on the National Register in 1992.

It was deemed significant, despite its small size and simple appearance, for once having carried interstate traffic on U.S. Highway 34, and for representing an early highway bridge in Nebraska. According to its NRHP nomination, "Its 1908 construction date distinguishes it as the earliest documented example of concrete bridge construction in the state. Despite its diminutive size and simple detailing, the bridge is a technologically significant early remnant of Nebraska transportation." It believed that it may have been designed by the Nebraska State Engineer, who, in 1908, had begun designing small concrete bridges.
