= List of bridges on the National Register of Historic Places in Wyoming =

This is a list of bridges and tunnels on the National Register of Historic Places in the U.S. state of Wyoming. Of the 41 bridges listed only 15 still exist.

Name	Image	Built	Listed	Location	County	Type	Status
AJX Bridge over South Fork and Powder River		1931, 1932	1985-02-22	Kaycee; 43°37′13″N 106°34′35″W	Johnson	Pratt deck truss	Still in use.
BMU Bridge over Wind River		c. 1935; moved 1953–1954	1985-02-22	Ethete; 43°8′36″N 108°42′29″W	Fremont	Parker through truss	Removed and replaced
Bridge over Snake River-Structure DEY			2022-08-01	Jackson; 43.371797°N 110.739138°W	Teton County		Removed in 2023
CKW Bridge over Powder River		1932, 1933	1985-02-22	Arvada; 44°41′51″N 106°5′58″W	Sheridan	Pratt deck truss	Removed and replaced
CQA Four Mile Bridge		1927, 1928	1985-02-22	Thermopolis; 43°36′13″N 108°11′48″W	Hot Springs	Pennsylvania through truss	Removed and replaced
DDZ Bridge over New Fork River		1917	1985-02-22	Boulder; 42°45′2″N 109°43′33″W	Sublette	Kingpost pony truss	Removed and replaced
DFU Elk Mountain Bridge		1923, 1924	1985-02-22	Elk Mountain; 41°41′12″N 106°24′34″W	Carbon	Warren pony truss	Removed and replaced
DMJ Pick Bridge		1909, 1910, 1934	1985-02-22	Saratoga; 41°32′22″N 106°52′51″W	Carbon	Parker through truss	Still in use
DML Butler Bridge		1930	1985-02-22	Encampment; 41°15′23″N 106°38′22″W	Carbon	Cammelback through truss	Still in use
DOE Bridge over Laramie River		1926, 1932	1985-02-22	Bosler; 41°35′32″N 105°39′23″W	Albany	Pratt Half-hip	Removed and replaced
DSD Bridge over Cheyenne River		c. 1915, 1921, 1922	1985-02-22	Riverview; 43°25′16″N 104°7′53″W	Niobrara	Pennsylvania through truss	Still in use
DUX Bessemer Bend Bridge		c. 1920	1985-02-22	Bessemer Bend; 42°46′18″N 106°31′50″W	Natrona	Warren through truss	Removed and replaced
DXN Bridge over Little Missouri River		1921	1985-02-22	Hulett; 44°58′59″N 104°29′39″W	Crook	Pratt pony truss	Abandoned
EAU Arvada Bridge		1914	1985-02-22	Arvada; 44°39′35″N 106°7′48″W	Sheridan	Parker through truss	Removed and replaced
EBF Bridge over Powder River		1915	1985-02-22	Leiter; 44°52′49″N 106°3′41″W	Sheridan	Pratt/Warren through truss	Removed and replaced
ECR Kooi Bridge		1913	1985-02-22	Monarch; 44°54′33″N 107°5′13″W	Sheridan	Pratt pony truss	Removed and replaced
ECS Bridge over Big Goose Creek		1914	1985-02-22	Sheridan; 44°44′35″N 107°7′45″W	Sheridan	Pratt pony truss	Removed and replaced
EDL Peloux Bridge		1912, 1913	1985-02-22	Buffalo; 44°21′47″N 106°39′14″W	Johnson	Pratt pony truss	Moved to city park.
EDZ Irigary Bridge		1913, 1963	1985-02-22	Sussex; 43°56′32″N 106°9′22″W	Johnson	Pennsylvania through truss	Moved to a new location.
EFP Bridge over Owl Creek		1919, 1920	1985-02-22	Thermopolis; 43°41′28″N 108°23′34″W	Hot Springs	Camelback through truss	Removed and replaced
EJE Bridge over Shell Creek		1920	1985-02-22	Shell; 44°32′5″N 107°48′6″W	Big Horn	Warren pony truss	Removed and replaced
EJP County Line Bridge		1917	1985-02-22	Hyattville; 44°9′59″N 107°41′1″W	Big Horn	Camelback pony truss	Abandoned
EJZ Bridge over Shoshone River		1925, 1926	1985-02-22	Lovell; 44°50′18″N 108°26′3″W	Big Horn	Warren pony truss	Still in use
ELS Bridge over Big Wind River		c. 1920	1985-02-22	Dubois; 43°33′6″N 109°40′45″W	Fremont		Removed and replaced
ELY Wind River Diversion Dam Bridge		1924, 1925	1985-02-22	Morton; 43°13′30″N 108°57′16″W	Fremont	Warren pony truss	Still in use
ENP Bridge over Green River		c. 1905	1985-02-22	Daniel; 42°46′47″N 109°58′7″W	Sublette	Pratt truss through & pony	Abandoned
ERT Bridge over Black's Fork		c. 1920	1985-02-22	Fort Bridger; 41°18′6″N 110°23′29″W	Uinta	Warren pony truss	Still in use
ETD Bridge over Green River		1913	1985-02-22	Fontenelle; 41°58′49″N 110°2′43″W	Sweetwater	Pratt through truss	Removed and replaced
ETR Big Island Bridge		1909, 1910	1985-02-22	Green River; 41°45′52″N 109°44′5″W	Sweetwater	Pratt through truss	Abandoned
EWZ Bridge over East Channel of Laramie River		1913, 1914	1985-02-22	Wheatland; 42°2′41″N 105°8′51″W	Platte	Pratt pony truss	Removed and replaced
Hayden Arch Bridge		1924, 1925	1985-02-22	Cody; 44°30′37″N 109°8′48″W	Park	Concrete Arch	Still in use
Rairden Bridge		1916	1985-02-22	Manderson; 44°11′40″N 107°54′53″W	Big Horn	Pennsylvania through truss	Abandoned
