= List of bridges documented by the Historic American Engineering Record in Wyoming =

This is a list of bridges documented by the Historic American Engineering Record in the U.S. state of Wyoming.

== Bridges ==
Survey No.	Name (as assigned by HAER)	Status	Type	Built	Documented	Carries	Crosses	Location	County	Coordinates
WY-1	North Platte River Bowstring Truss Bridge (Note: See also HAER No. IA-90, "Structural Study of Iron Bowstring Bridges" for additional documentation)	Bypassed	Bowstring arch truss	1875	1974		North Platte River	Fort Laramie	Goshen	42°12′36″N 104°32′01″W
WY-3; WY-46	Golden Gate Viaduct	Extant	Reinforced concrete girder	1933; 1977	1983; 1989	Grand Loop Road	Golden Gate Canyon	Lake	Teton	44°56′07″N 110°43′22″W
WY-7	Gardner River Bridge	Extant	Viaduct	1939	1983	North Entrance Road	Gardner River	Lake	Teton	44°57′29″N 110°40′45″W
WY-8	Tower Suspension Bridge	Extant	Suspension		1983	Yellowstone River Trail	Yellowstone River	Mammoth	Park	44°57′35″N 110°26′49″W
WY-9	Fishing Bridge	Extant	Timber stringer	1937	1983	East Entrance Road	Yellowstone River	Lake	Teton	44°34′00″N 110°22′56″W
WY-10	Obsidian Creek Bridge	Extant	Steel built-up girder	1910	1983	Indian Creek Campground	Obsidian Creek	Lake	Teton	44°52′55″N 110°44′06″W
WY-12	Lamar River Bridge	Extant	Steel built-up girder	1939	1989	Northeast Entrance Road	Lamar River	Lake	Teton	44°54′53″N 110°19′25″W
WY-20	Peloux Bridge	Extant	Pratt truss	1913	1982	CR 40	Clear Creek	Buffalo	Johnson	44°20′42″N 106°42′16″W
WY-21	Missouri River Bridge	Extant	Pratt truss	1920	1982	CR 200	Little Missouri River	Hulett	Crook	44°58′59″N 104°29′41″W
WY-22	Pick Bridge	Extant	Parker truss	1910	1982	CR 508	North Platte River	Saratoga	Carbon	41°32′22″N 106°52′55″W
WY-25	Cub Creek Bridge	Extant	Reinforced concrete closed-spandrel arch	1928	1989	East Entrance Road	Cub Creek	Lake	Teton	44°30′15″N 110°11′44″W
WY-26	Crawfish Creek Bridge	Extant	Reinforced concrete closed-spandrel arch	1936	1989	South Entrance Road	Crawfish Creek	Lake	Teton	44°09′06″N 110°40′24″W
WY-27	Firehole River Bridge	Extant	Pratt truss	1911	1989	Fountain Freight Road	Firehole River	Lake	Teton	44°30′58″N 110°49′58″W
WY-28	Seven Mile Bridge	Extant	Reinforced concrete girder	1932	1989	Grand Loop Road	Gardner River	Lake	Teton	44°53′10″N 110°43′53″W
WY-29	Gibbon River Bridge No. 1	Extant	Steel girder	1938	1989	Grand Loop Road	Gibbon River	Lake	Teton	44°41′03″N 110°44′40″W
WY-30	Gibbon River Bridge No. 2	Extant	Reinforced concrete girder	1938	1989	Grand Loop Road	Gibbon River	Lake	Teton	44°40′05″N 110°44′40″W
WY-31	Isa Lake Bridge	Extant	Timber stringer	1942	1989	Grand Loop Road	Isa Lake	Lake	Teton	44°26′29″N 110°43′08″W
WY-32	Otter Creek Bridge No. 1	Extant	Reinforced concrete girder	1935	1989	Grand Loop Road	Otter Creek	Lake	Teton	44°42′06″N 110°30′22″W
WY-33	Tower Creek Bridge	Extant	Reinforced concrete closed-spandrel arch	1933	1989	Grand Loop Road	Tower Creek	Lake	Teton	44°53′32″N 110°23′16″W
WY-34	Lava Creek Bridge	Extant	Reinforced concrete cast-in-place slab	1933	1989	Grand Loop Road	Lava Creek	Lake	Teton	44°56′27″N 110°37′56″W
WY-35	Sedge Creek Bridge	Extant	Reinforced concrete girder	1935	1989	East Entrance Road	Sedge Creek	Lake	Teton	44°31′25″N 110°16′53″W
WY-36	TLF Creek Bridge	Extant	Reinforced concrete cast-in-place slab	1936	1989	Northeast Entrance Road	TLF Creek	Lake	Teton	44°59′07″N 110°03′29″W
WY-37	RWC Creek Bridge	Extant	Reinforced concrete cast-in-place slab	1936	1989	Northeast Entrance Road	RWC Creek	Lake	Teton	44°58′28″N 110°03′56″W
WY-38	FHWA Creek Bridge	Extant	Reinforced concrete cast-in-place slab	1936	1989	Northeast Entrance Road	FHWA Creek	Lake	Teton	44°57′45″N 110°04′15″W
WY-39	Soda Butte Creek Bridge No. 1	Extant	Reinforced concrete cast-in-place slab	1936	1989	Northeast Entrance Road	Soda Butte Creek	Lake	Teton	44°59′30″N 110°03′23″W
WY-40	Pebble Creek Bridge	Extant	Reinforced concrete girder	1936	1989	Northeast Entrance Road	Pebble Creek	Lake	Teton	44°54′53″N 110°06′44″W
WY-44	Firehole River Bridge	Extant	Reinforced concrete girder	1935	1989	Grand Loop Road	Firehole River	Lake	Teton	44°28′27″N 110°50′33″W
WY-47	Otter Creek Bridge No. 2	Extant	Reinforced concrete girder	1935	1989	Grand Loop Road spur	Otter Creek	Lake	Teton	44°42′04″N 110°30′35″W
WY-48	Nez Perce Bridge	Extant	Reinforced concrete girder	1935	1989	Grand Loop Road	Nez Perce Creek	Lake	Teton	44°34′23″N 110°49′14″W
WY-49	Pelican Creek Bridge	Extant	Reinforced concrete girder	1935	1989	East Entrance Road	Pelican Creek	Lake	Teton	44°33′33″N 110°21′24″W
WY-50	Soda Butte Creek Bridge No. 2	Extant	Steel girder	1936	1993	Northeast Entrance Road	Soda Butte Creek	Lake	Teton	44°56′42″N 110°04′56″W
WY-53	Chicago and North Western Railroad, Stone Culvert	Extant	Stone arch	1901	1991	Chicago and North Western Railroad		Keeline	Niobrara	42°45′37″N 104°53′18″W
WY-56	South Fork Powder River Bridge	Extant	Pratt truss	1932	1982	I-25 service road	Powder River south fork	Kaycee	Johnson	43°37′13″N 106°34′37″W
WY-57	Wind River Bridge	Replaced	Parker truss	1935	1982	WYO 132	Wind River	Ethete	Fremont	43°08′36″N 108°42′29″W
WY-58	Powder River Bridge	Replaced	Pratt truss	1933	1982	US 14 / US 16	Powder River	Arvada	Sheridan	44°41′50″N 106°06′47″W
WY-59	Four Mile Bridge	Replaced	Pennsylvania truss	1928	1982	CR 173	Bighorn River	Thermopolis	Hot Springs	43°36′12″N 108°11′51″W
WY-60	New Fork River Bridge	Replaced	Kingpost truss	1917	1982	CR 173	New Fork River	Boulder	Sublette	42°44′58″N 109°43′38″W
WY-61	Medicine Bow Bridge	Replaced	Warren truss	1924	1982	CR 3	Medicine Bow River	Elk Mountain	Carbon	41°41′13″N 106°24′47″W
WY-62	Butler Bridge	Extant	Parker truss	1930	1982	CR 203	North Platte River	Encampment	Carbon	41°15′24″N 106°38′24″W
WY-63	Laramie River Bridge	Replaced	Pratt truss	1926	1982	CR 740	Laramie River	Bosler	Albany	41°35′30″N 105°41′24″W
WY-64	Cheyenne River Bridge	Extant	Pennsylvania truss	1915	1982	CR 46	Cheyenne River	Riverview	Niobrara	43°25′17″N 104°07′55″W
WY-65	Bessemer Bend Bridge	Replaced	Warren truss	1922	1982	CR 58	North Platte River	Bessemer Bend	Natrona	42°46′18″N 106°31′50″W
WY-66	Arvada Bridge	Replaced	Parker truss	1917	1982	CR 38	Powder River	Arvada	Sheridan	44°39′02″N 106°07′51″W
WY-67	Powder River Bridge	Replaced	Pratt truss and Warren truss	1915	1982	CR 269	Powder River	Leiter	Sheridan	44°52′49″N 106°03′43″W
WY-68	Tongue River Bridge	Replaced	Pratt truss	1913	1982	CR 97	Tongue River	Monarch	Sheridan	44°54′33″N 107°05′15″W
WY-69	Big Goose Creek Bridge	Replaced	Pratt truss	1914	1982	CR 5	Big Goose Creek	Sheridan	Sheridan	44°44′34″N 107°07′48″W
WY-70	Irigary Bridge	Extant	Pennsylvania truss	1913	1982	CR 254	Powder River	Sussex	Johnson	43°56′22″N 106°09′27″W
WY-71	Owl Creek Bridge	Replaced	Parker truss	1920	1982	CR 287	Owl Creek	Thermopolis	Hot Springs	43°41′28″N 108°23′34″W
WY-72	Shell Creek Bridge	Replaced	Warren truss	1920	1982	CR 57	Shell Creek	Shell	Big Horn	44°32′05″N 107°48′06″W
WY-73	Shoshone River Bridge	Extant	Warren truss	1926	1982	CR 111	Shoshone River	Lovell	Big Horn	44°50′18″N 108°26′05″W
WY-74	Big Wind River Bridge	Replaced	Kingpost truss	1920	1982	CR 21	Wind River	Dubois	Fremont	43°32′47″N 109°40′02″W
WY-75	Wind River Diverson Dam Bridge	Extant	Warren truss	1925	1982	CR 24	Wind River	Morton	Fremont	43°13′30″N 108°57′19″W
WY-76	Green River Bridge	Extant	Pratt truss	1905	1982	CR 145	Green River	Daniel	Sublette	42°46′46″N 109°58′10″W
WY-77	Black's Fork Bridge	Replaced	Warren truss	1925	1982	CR 217	Blacks Fork	Fort Bridger	Uinta	41°18′05″N 110°23′31″W
WY-78	Green River Bridge	Replaced	Pratt truss	1913	1982	CR 8	Green River	Fontenelle	Lincoln	41°58′49″N 110°02′43″W
WY-79	Big Island Bridge	Extant	Pratt truss	1910	1982	CR 4	Green River	Green River	Sweetwater	41°45′52″N 109°44′05″W
WY-80	Laramie River Bridge	Replaced	Pratt truss	1913	1982	CR 204	Laramie River	Wheatland	Platte	42°02′41″N 105°08′51″W
WY-81	Hayden Arch Bridge	Extant	Reinforced concrete open-spandrel arch	1925	1982	US 14 / US 16 (former)	Shoshone River	Cody	Park	44°30′37″N 109°08′50″W
WY-84	Canyon Creek Bridge No. 924	Abandoned	Steel built-up girder	1923	1998	Chicago and North Western Railway	Canyon Creek	Casper	Natrona	42°50′27″N 106°11′35″W
WY-85	North Platte River Bridge No. 1210	Repurposed	Steel built-up girder	1930	1998	Chicago and North Western Railway (now Platte River Trail)	North Platte River	Casper	Natrona	42°50′31″N 106°21′36″W
WY-86	Corkscrew Bridge	Abandoned	Reinforced concrete closed-spandrel arch	1929	2000	East Entrance Road	East Entrance Road	Lake	Teton	44°27′36″N 110°07′03″W
WY-87	Canyon Bridge	Extant	Reinforced concrete open-spandrel arch	1915	2000	North Rim Drive	Jay Creek	Lake	Teton	44°42′41″N 110°30′07″W
WY-88	Chittenden Memorial Bridge	Extant	Reinforced concrete open-spandrel arch	1962	2000	South Rim Drive	Yellowstone River	Lake	Teton	44°42′29″N 110°30′09″W
WY-92-A	Beartooth Highway, Beartooth Lake Bridge	Extant	Reinforced concrete cast-in-place slab	1932	2004	US 212	Beartooth Lake outlet	Cody	Park	44°56′22″N 109°35′58″W
WY-92-B	Beartooth Highway, Little Bear Creek Bridge No. 1	Extant	Reinforced concrete cast-in-place slab	1932	2004	US 212	Little Bear Creek	Cody	Park	44°56′36″N 109°33′48″W
WY-92-C	Beartooth Highway, Little Bear Creek Bridge No. 2	Extant	Reinforced concrete cast-in-place slab	1932	2004	US 212	Little Bear Creek	Cody	Park	44°56′21″N 109°32′55″W
WY-92-D	Beartooth Highway, Long Lake Bridge	Extant	Reinforced concrete cast-in-place slab	1932	2004	US 212	Long Lake outlet	Cody	Park	44°56′24″N 109°30′29″W
WY-93	North Fork of Crazy Woman Creek Bridge	Replaced	Double-intersection Warren truss	1880	2006	Middle Fork Road	Crazy Woman Creek north fork	Buffalo	Johnson	44°05′07″N 106°40′19″W
WY-96	North Platte River Bridge	Replaced	Reinforced concrete girder	1923	2007	US 20 / US 26	North Platte River	Douglas	Converse	42°45′46″N 105°23′40″W
WY-102	Peru Cutoff Bridge	Replaced	Steel built-up girder	1924	2015	CR 37 (Peru Cutoff Road)	Union Pacific Railroad	James Town	Sweetwater	41°32′59″N 109°35′32″W
