= Bridge over Green River =

Bridge over Green River may refer to the following bridges:

- ENP Bridge over Green River, near Daniel, Wyoming
- ETD Bridge over Green River, near Fontenelle, Wyoming
