= DMJ (disambiguation) =

DMJ may refer to:

- Duke Mathematical Journal, a peer-reviewed mathematics journal
- Global Air (Mexico), the ICAO code DMJ
- DMJ Pick Bridge, a Parker through truss bridge located near Saratoga, Wyoming
- Diploma in Medical Jurisprudence, a postgraduate diploma program to train and equip medical graduates
