= DUX Bessemer Bend Bridge =

- U.S. National Register of Historic Places
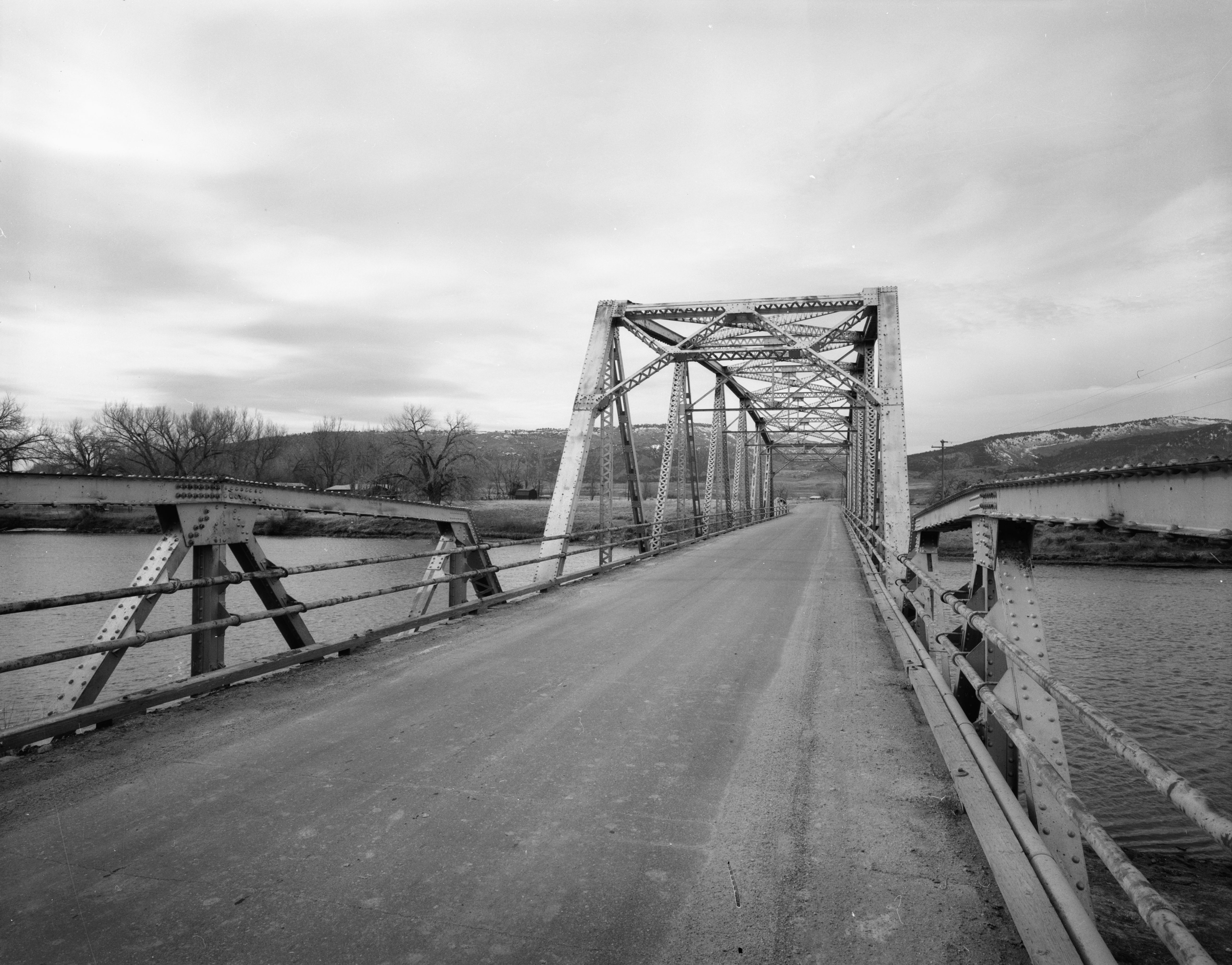
- The bridge in 1982

- Location within Wyoming Location within the United States
- Location: County Road CN1-58, Bessemer Bend, Wyoming
- Coordinates: 42°46′18″N 106°31′50″W
- Area: less than one acre
- Built: 1921–22
- Architectural style: Warren through truss
- MPS: Vehicular Truss and Arch Bridges in Wyoming TR
- NRHP reference No.: 85000428
- Added to NRHP: February 22, 1985

The DUX Bessemer Bend Bridge was a Warren through truss bridge in Bessemer Bend, Wyoming, which carried Natrona County Road CN1-58 (Bessemer Bend Road) across the North Platte River. The bridge was built from 1921 to 1922. When nominated to the National Register of Historic Places in 1982, it was one of only three Warren through truss bridges remaining on Wyoming county highways. In addition, the bridge was located at the site of a historic river crossing on the Oregon Trail.

The bridge was added to the National Register on February 22, 1985. It was one of several bridges added to the NRHP for their role in the history of Wyoming bridge construction.

== See also ==
- List of bridges documented by the Historic American Engineering Record in Wyoming
