= ECR Kooi Bridge =

- U.S. National Register of Historic Places
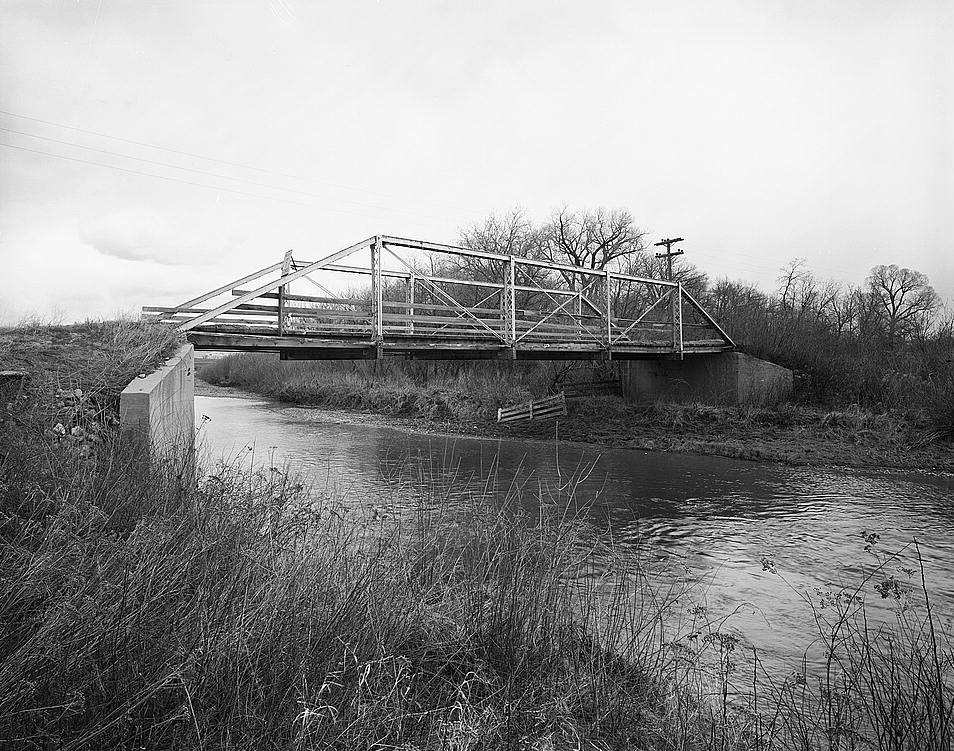
- The bridge in 1982

- Location within Wyoming Location within the United States
- Nearest city: Monarch, Wyoming
- Coordinates: 44°54′33″N 107°5′13″W
- Area: less than one acre
- Built: 1913
- Built by: Gregg, Jack
- Architectural style: Pratt pony truss
- MPS: Vehicular Truss and Arch Bridges in Wyoming TR
- NRHP reference No.: 85000436
- Added to NRHP: February 22, 1985

The ECR Kooi Bridge is a bridge in Sheridan County, Wyoming, located 2.7 miles (4.3 km) west of the community of Monarch. The bridge carries Sheridan County Road CN3-93 across the Tongue River. Contractor Jack Gregg built the bridge in 1913. The single-span pin-connected Pratt pony truss bridge is 81.6 feet (24.9 m) long with an 80-foot (24 m) span; it is the longest bridge of its type still in use in the Wyoming state and county highway system. The bridge's roadway was constructed with wooden stringers and decking; its guardrails are also wooden. The pin-connected Pratt pony truss was a common type of truss bridge in Wyoming, and the Kooi Bridge was one of the earlier bridges to use the design.

The bridge was added to the National Register of Historic Places in 1985. It was one of 31 Wyoming bridges added for their significance in the history of Wyoming bridge construction.
