= ELY Wind River Diversion Dam Bridge =

- U.S. National Register of Historic Places
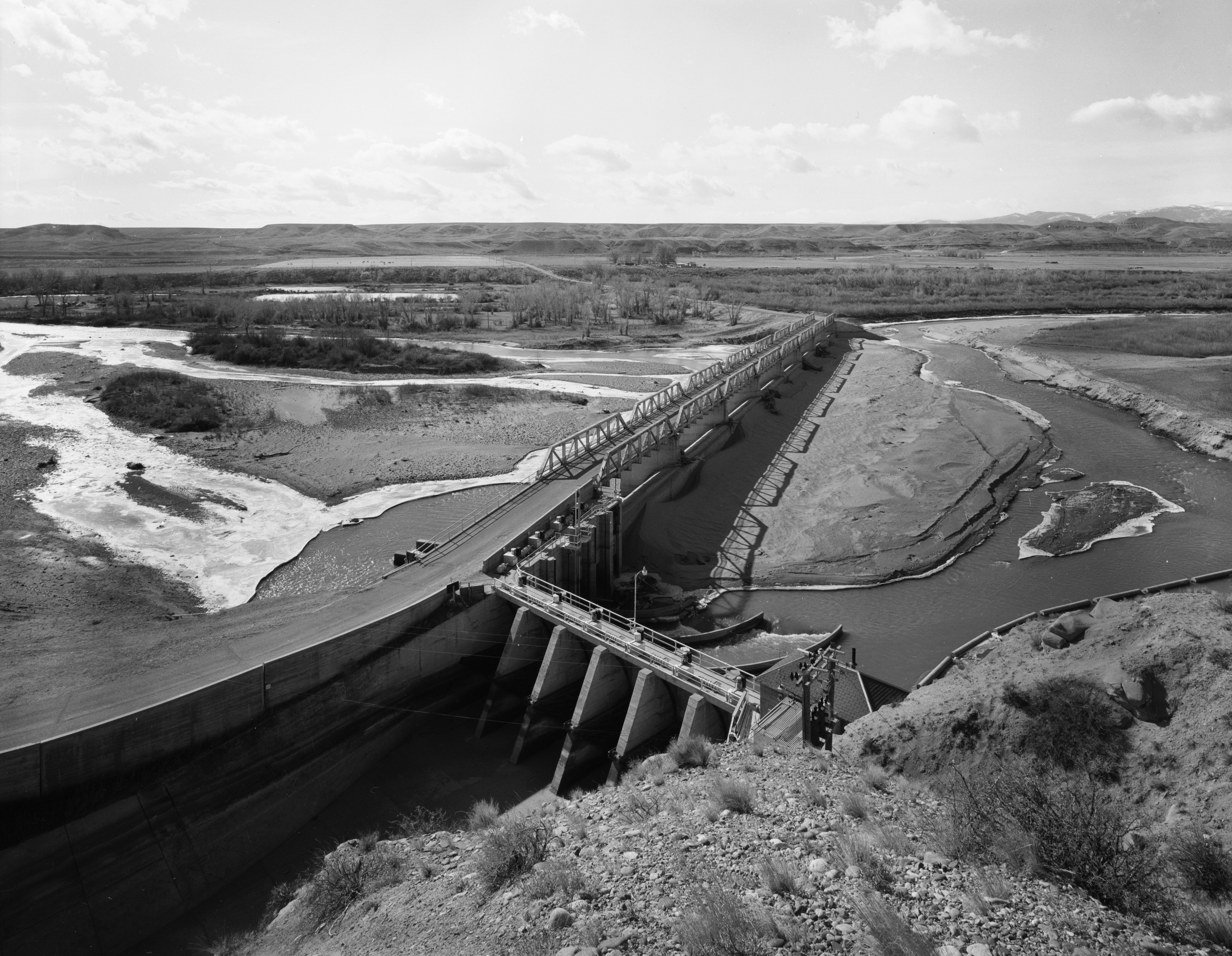
- The bridge in 1982

- Location within Wyoming Location within the United States
- Nearest city: Morton, Wyoming
- Coordinates: 43°13′30″N 108°57′19″W
- Area: less than one acre
- Built: 1924–25
- Built by: Taggart Construction Company
- Architectural style: Warren pony truss
- MPS: Vehicular Truss and Arch Bridges in Wyoming TR
- NRHP reference No.: 85000422
- Added to NRHP: February 22, 1985

The ELY Wind River Diversion Dam Bridge is a Warren pony truss bridge located near Morton, Wyoming, USA, which carries Fremont County Road CN10-24 across the Wind River. The bridge's structure is integrated with the Wind River Diversion Dam. It was the first truss bridge to be connected with a dam during its construction. The Taggart Construction Company built the bridge from 1924 to 1925. The bridge is 655 feet (200 m) long and has eight spans, making it both the longest road truss bridge in Wyoming and the road bridge with the most spans in the state.

The bridge was added to the National Register of Historic Places on February 22, 1985. It was one of 31 bridges added to the National Register for its role in the history of Wyoming bridge construction.

== See also ==
- List of bridges documented by the Historic American Engineering Record in Wyoming
