= CKW Bridge over Powder River =

- U.S. National Register of Historic Places
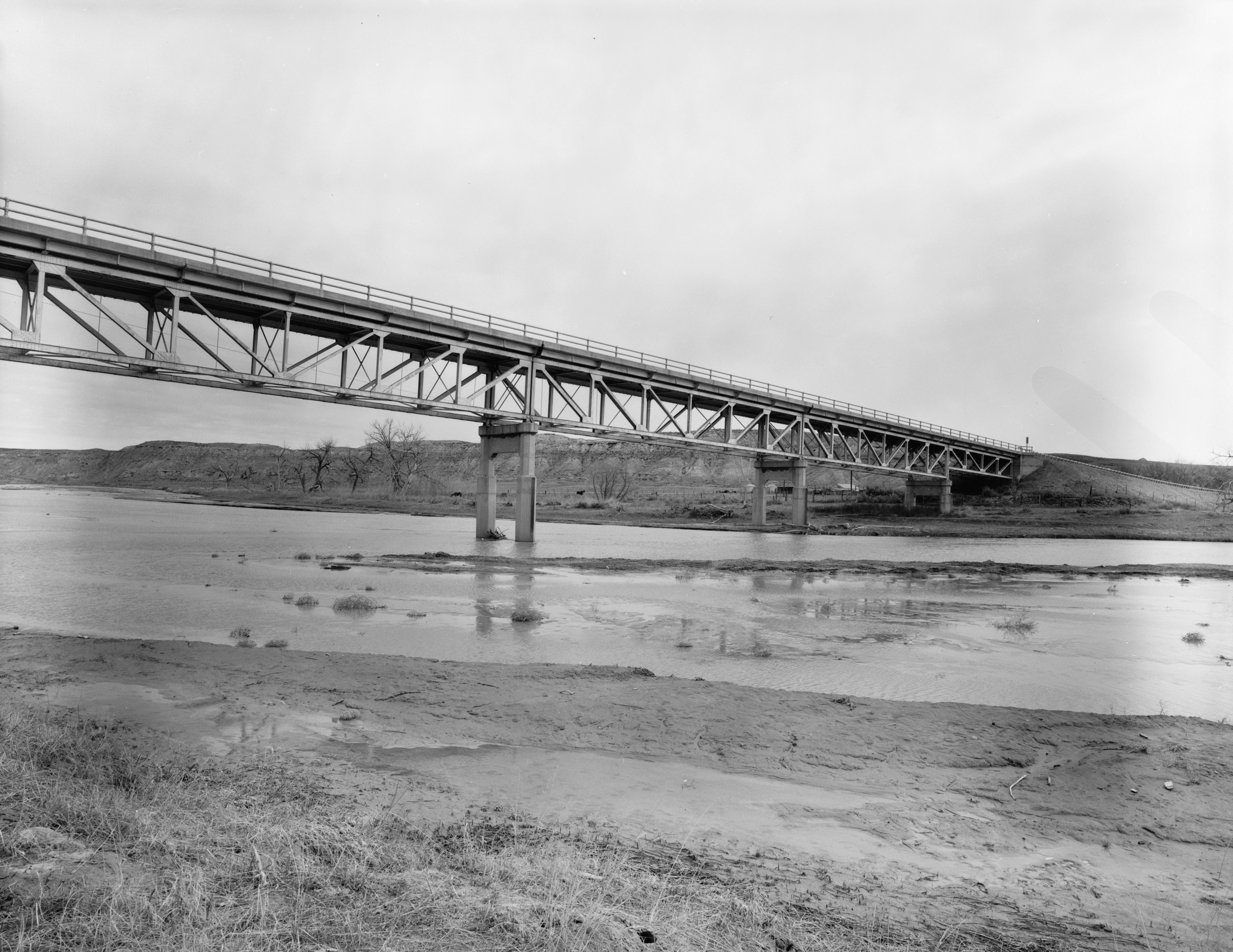
- The bridge in 1982

- Location within Wyoming Location within the United States
- Nearest city: US 14 / US 16, Arvada, Wyoming
- Coordinates: 44.697181°N 106.112934°W
- Area: less than one acre
- Built: 1932–33
- Built by: W. P. Roscoe Co.
- Architectural style: Pratt deck truss
- MPS: Vehicular Truss and Arch Bridges in Wyoming TR
- NRHP reference No.: 85000432
- Added to NRHP: February 22, 1985

The CKW Bridge over Powder River is a Pratt deck truss bridge near Arvada, Wyoming, which carries US 14/US 16 across the Powder River. The bridge was built from 1932 to 1933 by the W. P. Roscoe Company. The 452-foot (138 m) bridge has three continuous main spans and two shallow approach spans. It is the only continuous truss bridge still in use on a Wyoming road and one of only two deck truss bridges built on a major highway.

The bridge was added to the National Register of Historic Places on February 22, 1985. It was one of several bridges added to the NRHP for its role in the history of Wyoming bridge construction.

== See also ==
- List of bridges documented by the Historic American Engineering Record in Wyoming
