= EAU Arvada Bridge =

- U.S. National Register of Historic Places
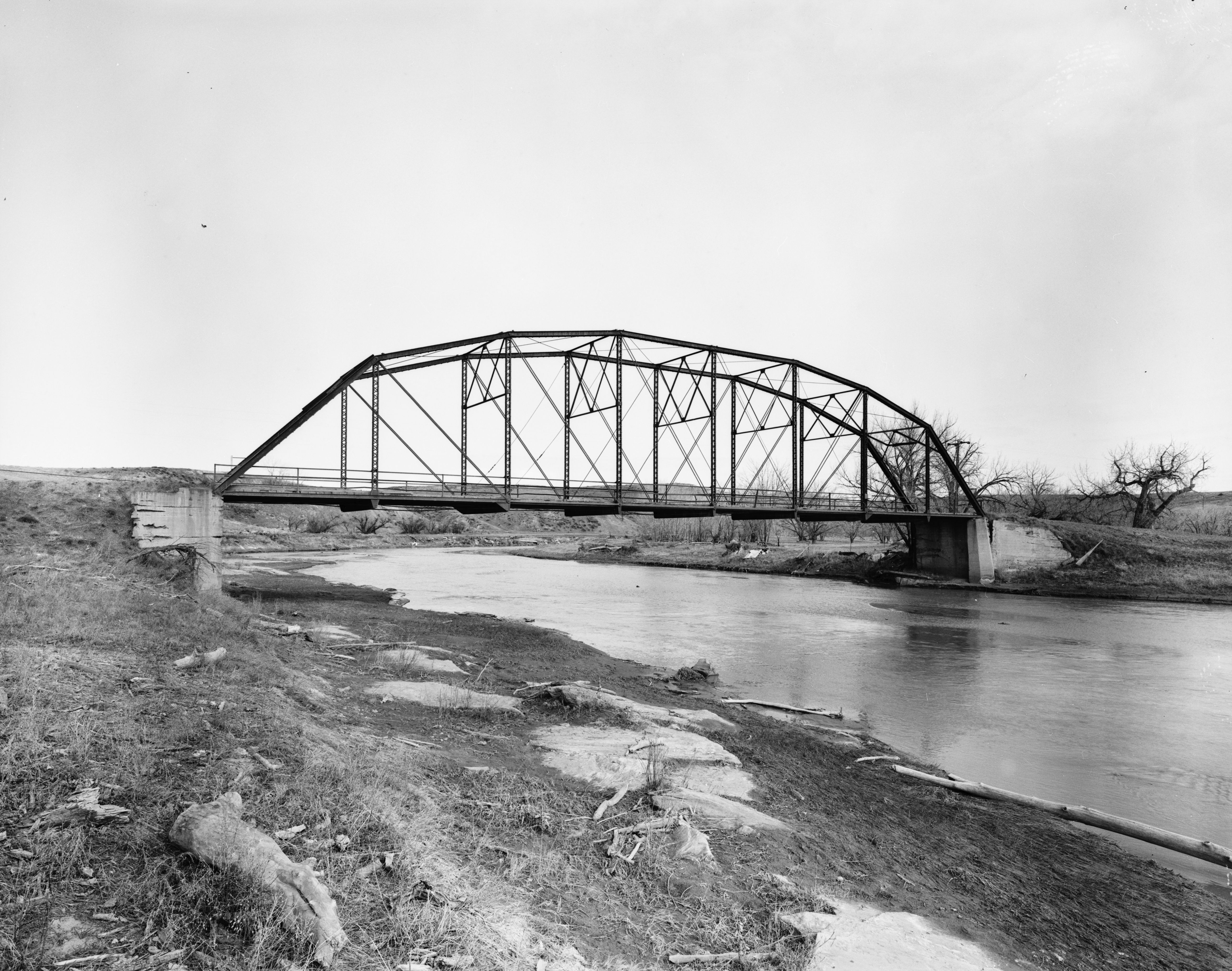
- The bridge in 1982

- Location within Wyoming Location within the United States
- Nearest city: Arvada, Wyoming
- Coordinates: 44°39′02″N 106°07′51″W
- Area: less than one acre
- Built: 1917
- Built by: Monarch Engineering Company
- Architectural style: Parker through truss
- MPS: Vehicular Truss and Arch Bridges in Wyoming TR
- NRHP reference No.: 85000433
- Added to NRHP: February 22, 1985

The EAU Arvada Bridge was a Parker through truss bridge located near Arvada, Wyoming, which carried Sheridan County Road CN3-38 across the Powder River. The bridge was built in 1917 by the Monarch Engineering Company of Denver. The single-span 8-panel bridge was 162 feet (49 m) long and was connected by steel pins. When nominated to the National Register of Historic Places in 1982, it was one of only two Parker through truss bridges remaining in Wyoming.

The bridge was added to the National Register on February 22, 1985. It was one of several bridges added to the NRHP for its historic role in Wyoming bridge construction. The bridge was replaced in 1990.

== See also ==
- DMJ Pick Bridge, now the only Parker truss bridge remaining in Wyoming
- List of bridges documented by the Historic American Engineering Record in Wyoming
