= DSD Bridge over Cheyenne River =

- U.S. National Register of Historic Places
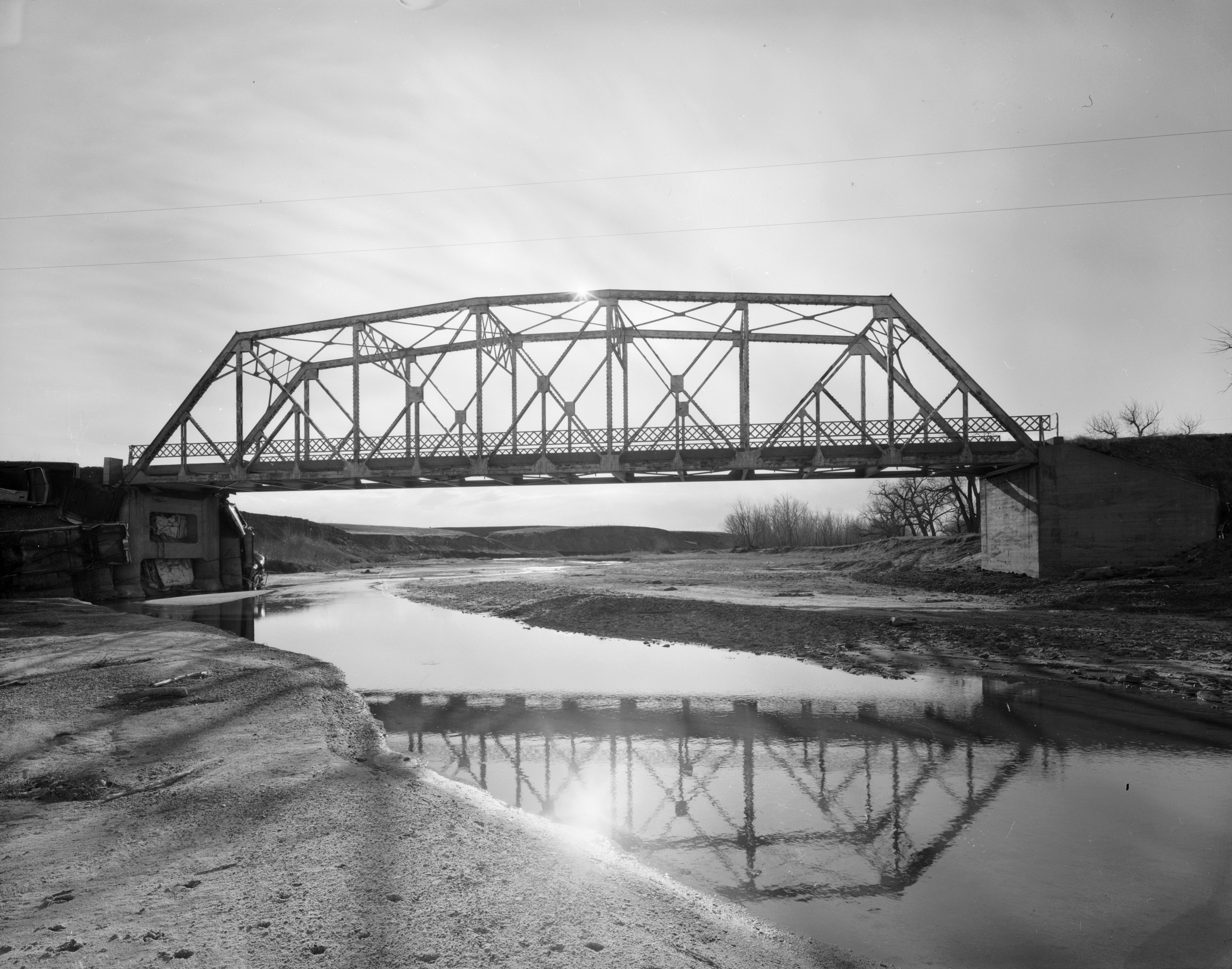

- Location within Wyoming Location within the United States
- Nearest city: Riverview, Wyoming
- Coordinates: 43°25′17″N 104°07′55″W
- Built: 1915
- Architectural style: Pennsylvania through truss
- MPS: Vehicular Truss and Arch Bridges in Wyoming TR
- NRHP reference No.: 85000429
- Added to NRHP: February 22, 1985

The DSD Bridge across the Cheyenne River in Wyoming is a single-span truss bridge built circa 1915. The steel seven-panel Pennsylvania truss spans 130.67 feet (39.83 m) on Niobrara County Road CN14-46. It was placed on the National Register of Historic Places as part of a thematic study of Wyoming river crossings in 1985.

== See also ==
- List of bridges documented by the Historic American Engineering Record in Wyoming
