= Battle of Suggs =

Part of the Johnson County War (1892)

- Part of Johnson County War
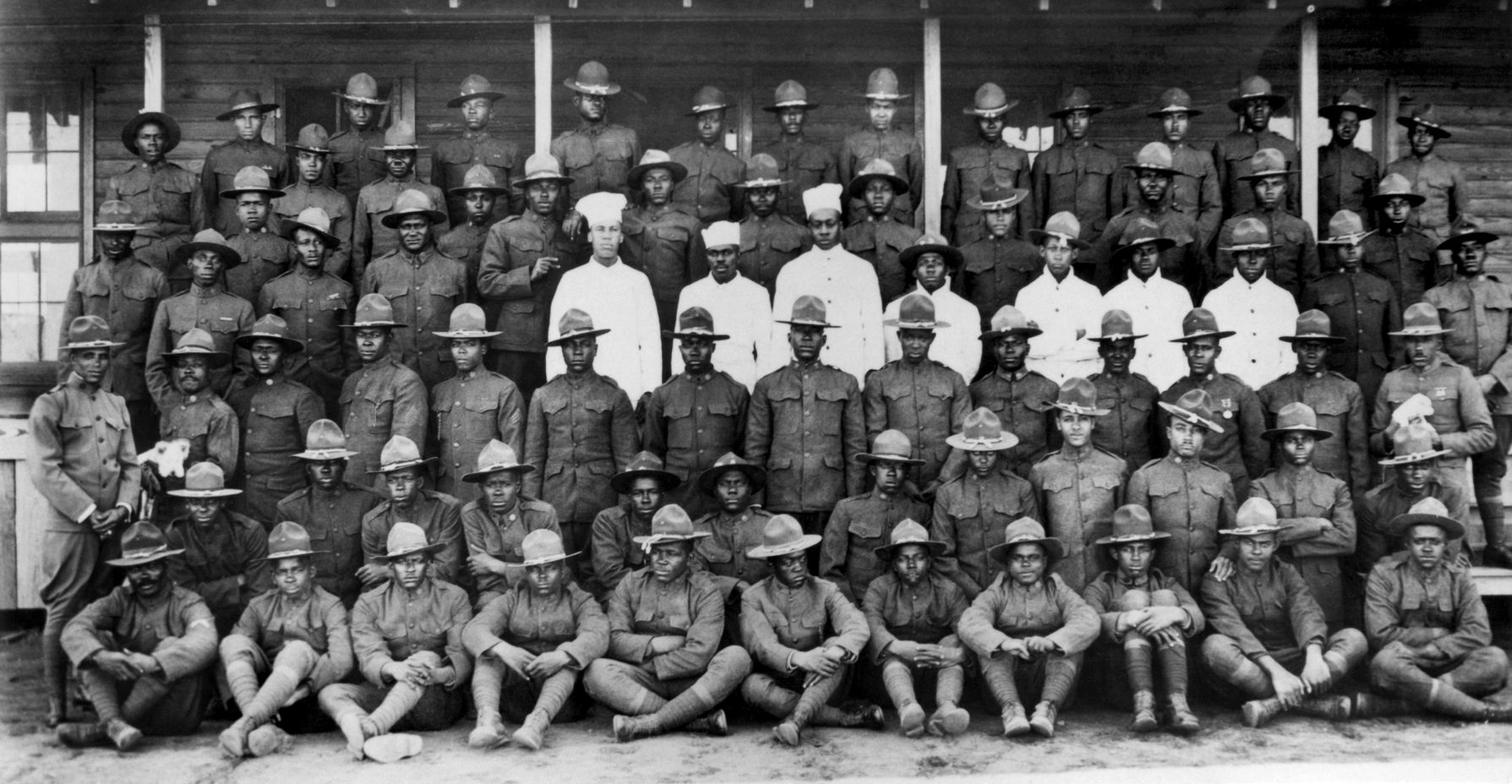
- Buffalo Soldiers stationed at Fort D. A. Russell in Cheyenne, Wyoming.
Date	June 17, 1892
Location	Suggs, Wyoming 44.649°N 106.114°W
Result	Homesteader victory

Belligerents
(United States) 9th Cavalry	Homesteaders

Commanders and leaders
(United States) Charles S. Ilsey	Jack Ball

Strength
20-44	Unknown

Casualties and losses
1 killed 2-5 wounded	1 wounded

The Battle of Suggs, also known as the Suggs Affray, Suggs Affair and Suggs War, was a shootout between Buffalo Soldiers and Wyoming homesteaders in Suggs, Wyoming on June 17, 1892. The skirmish was part of a larger conflict known as the Johnson County War fought from 1889 to 1893, between wealthy ranchers and settlers of modest means, whom the former accused of being rustlers.

== Background ==
Communities near the Powder River in Wyoming became battlefields for a range war known as the Johnson County War, in which large cattle ranchers fought smaller settlers and homesteaders for the limited resources needed for ranching. The conflict resulted in lynchings, assassinations, and gunfights throughout Northern Wyoming, before culminating in a shootout at the KC Ranch and a large siege at the TA Ranch.

To stop further violence, the government sent out the army to keep the peace. Initially, the 6th cavalry from Fort McKinney was tasked to pacify the locals but failed because many became embroiled in the conflict. This failure resulted in the death of US Marshall George Wellman and the injury of First Lieutenant Charles B. Gatewood. The 6th was later replaced by the 9th Cavalry, a Buffalo Soldier regiment from Fort Robinson, on June 13, 1892. The regiment was composed of 310 men and was led by Major Charles S. Isley. They created Camp Bettens as a base of operations upon arriving.

The cattle barons hoped that the regiment would be less sympathetic to the plight of the homesteaders as compared to the 6th. This turned out to be correct, as the arrival of the 9th was met with hostility from the locals who did not take kindly to the authority of colored soldiers. The hostility was exacerbated by the 9th's association with Phil DuFran, a detective and combatant for the cattle barons during the TA Ranch siege. DuFran assisted the soldiers during their occupation.

== Battle ==
Off-duty Buffalo Soldiers were being refused services in bars, barbershops, and brothels by the locals of the nearby town of Suggs in Sheridan County, Wyoming. At that time, Suggs was a temporary makeshift community that was built near a railroad. On June 16, two soldiers by the name of Private Abraham Champ and Private Emile Smith, members of G Troop and E Troop respectively, were drinking at a saloon in Suggs when the former was threatened by a white man, who brandished a pistol and said, "Ain't your mother a black bitch?" When Smith drew his pistol in response, several of the other bar patrons aimed their firearms at him. Fortunately for the two, the bartender snuck the soldiers out of the building through the backdoor. As they rode back to camp, they were shot upon by unknown assailants. This incident enraged many soldiers at Camp Bettens.

The next day on June 17, using the cover of the night, 20 or more buffalo soldiers slipped from the camp and travelled to Suggs, possibly on-foot. Upon arriving, they began firing their guns, demanding the town to surrender those responsible for the previous event. A US Marshall named Jack Ball met with the soldiers and tried to calm them down, but they shoved him away. The soldiers then began firing at the saloon where Champ and Smith were harassed. Soon, the townspeople retaliated, firing their weapons from behind windows, doors, and walls. The retaliation surprised the soldiers; Captain William Tompkins was wounded in the hand, Private William Champ was wounded in the shoulder, and Private Willis Johnson was shot through the head and killed. The soldiers were then forced to retreat. In his report, Major Isley stated:

Black regulators, the soldiers, have no particular business in Suggs. The camp of the six troops of colored cavalry is located three miles above Suggs, in a heavy growth of cottonwood. Here they have the canteen located a half mile away where beer and trimmings are sold on sight. The guard house is located on a high bluff and is a tent with the sides rolled up. There are a number of the survivors of the Suggs war still confined in the guard house. The track of bullets is’ seen in window-glass, tents and logs that flew promiscuously through the air of Suggs that fatal night.

Wyoming native G. T. Seabury also wrote to a friend about Barber's Hotel being hit by bullets during the battle. He stated:

There is going to be a terrible row at Powder river. They shot seventeen bullets through Barber’s hotel the other night when the (black soldiers) were killed. They did not seem to care where they shot. As it was no one in the hotel happened to be hit, but they were in big luck. There will be here to-day or to-morrow six companies more of cavalry from the east. There is sure to be war here before this thing is ended.

One alleged rustler, a man by the name of Bennett, was wounded in the arm. After the gunfight, Camp Bettens sent out two companies to pacify Suggs. In contrast to the previous event, the homesteaders allowed these troops into the town. The Army conducted an investigation but could not identify the people responsible for Johnson's death. To prevent further violence, the camp could only prohibit the presence of off-duty soldiers in the town.

== Other murders ==
DuFran became missing for three days after the skirmish. Another soldier by the name of Brown was murdered in a separate incident near Camp Bettens. Brown was at a shooting range when a cowboy rode by and came upon him. After a brief conversation, the cowboy drew a pistol and shot Brown, killing him. By June 24, the Newcastle News-Journal reported that two Buffalo Soldiers had been killed in Suggs. By the end of the war, a total of three soldiers had lost their lives and were buried near the Powder River.

== Aftermath ==
The deaths of the Buffalo Soldiers forced the Army to remove the regiment from Camp Bettens and back to Fort Robinson in November 1892. Peacekeeping went back to local law enforcement for the duration of the war.

== In other media ==
The battle was briefly mentioned in Asa Mercer's book entitled The Banditti of the Plains and the episode "Johnson County Cattle War" of the documentary Vendettas by History Channel.
