= DDZ Bridge over New Fork River =

- U.S. National Register of Historic Places
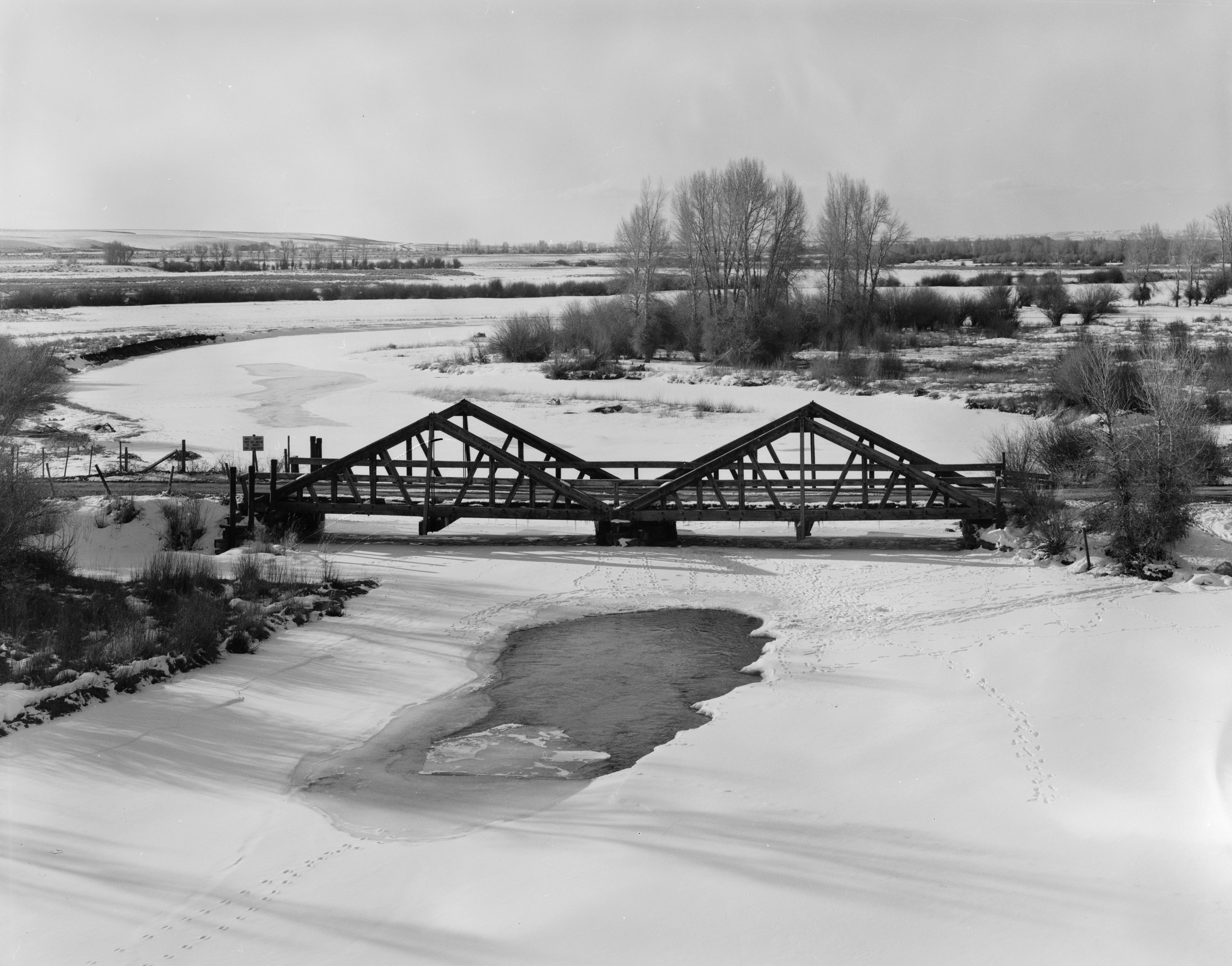
- The bridge in 1982

- Location within Wyoming Location within the United States
- Nearest city: Boulder, Wyoming
- Coordinates: 42°44′58″N 109°43′38″W
- Area: less than one acre
- Built: 1917
- Architectural style: Kingpost pony truss
- MPS: Vehicular Truss and Arch Bridges in Wyoming TR
- NRHP reference No.: 85000437
- Added to NRHP: February 22, 1985

The DDZ Bridge over New Fork River is a Kingpost pony truss bridge located near Boulder, Wyoming, United States, which carries Sublette County Road 136 across the New Fork River. The bridge was built in 1917 by Lincoln County's government, as Sublette County had not yet been formed. Unlike most truss bridges at the time, the bridge was built with timber trusses rather than steel; it is the only wooden two-span Kingpost truss bridge remaining in Wyoming. The bridge's construction is considered to be "the most sophisticated" of extant wooden truss bridges in the state.

The bridge was added to the National Register of Historic Places on February 22, 1985. It was one of several bridges added to the NRHP for its role in the history of Wyoming bridge construction.

== See also ==
- List of bridges documented by the Historic American Engineering Record in Wyoming
