= ERT Bridge over Black's Fork =

- U.S. National Register of Historic Places
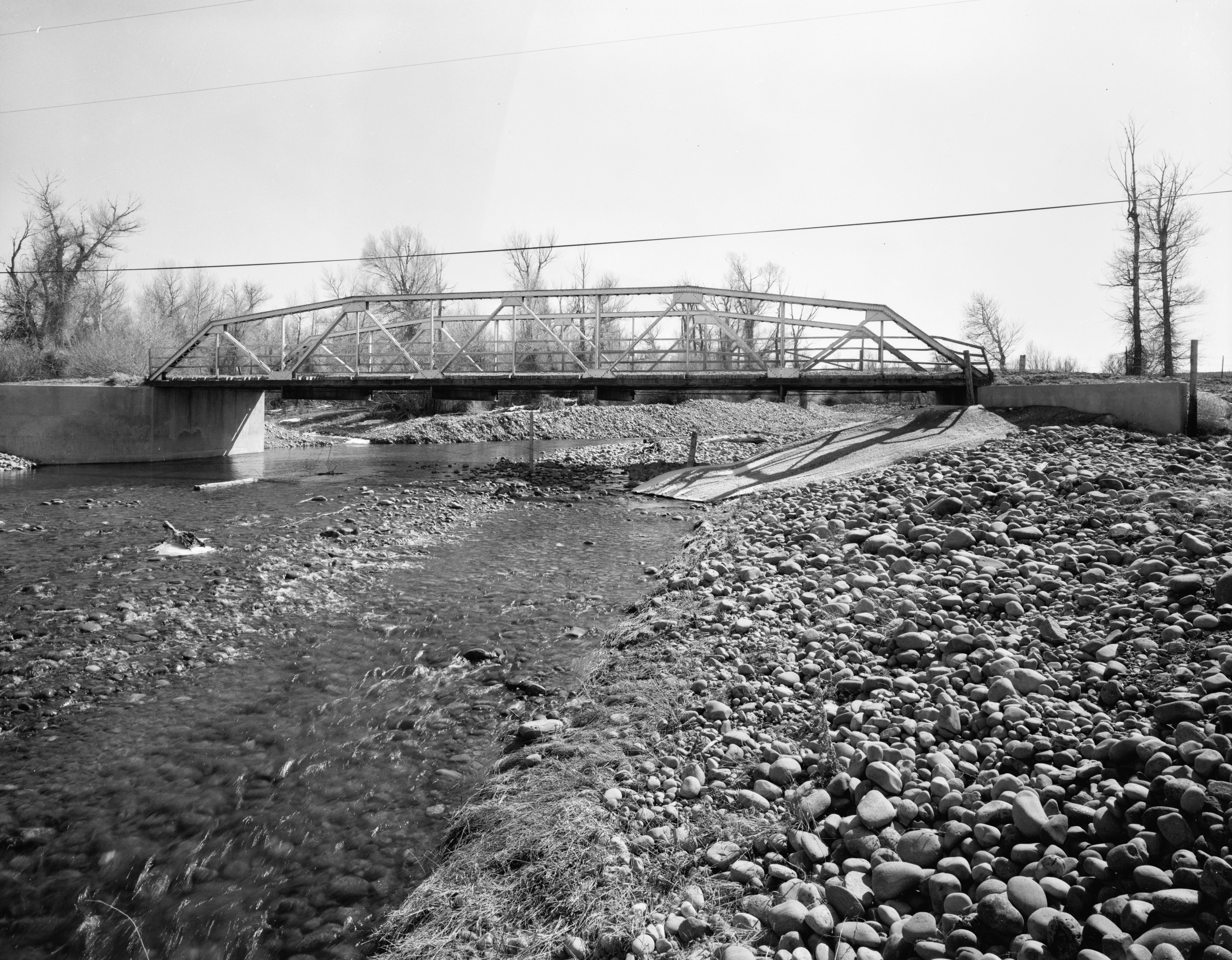

- Location within Wyoming Location within the United States
- Nearest city: Fort Bridger, Wyoming
- Coordinates: 41°18′05″N 110°23′31″W
- Area: less than one acre
- Built: 1920
- Architectural style: Warren pony truss
- MPS: Vehicular Truss and Arch Bridges in Wyoming TR
- NRHP reference No.: 85000441
- Added to NRHP: February 22, 1985

The ERT Bridge over Blacks Fork near Fort Bridger, Wyoming, was listed on the National Register of Historic Places in 1985 as part of a thematic study on early 20th century steel truss bridges in Wyoming. The ERT Bridge is a Warren pony truss bridge spanning 80 feet (24 m) with a width of 15.75 feet (4.80 m). Set on concrete abutments, the ERT Bridge was built around 1920 by Uinta County. It is an example of a transitional design from locally built bridges to standardized State designs

== See also ==
- List of bridges documented by the Historic American Engineering Record in Wyoming
