= Hayden Arch Bridge =

Historic bridge in Park County, Wyoming, United States

- Hayden Arch Bridge - Mirror Image
- U.S. National Register of Historic Places
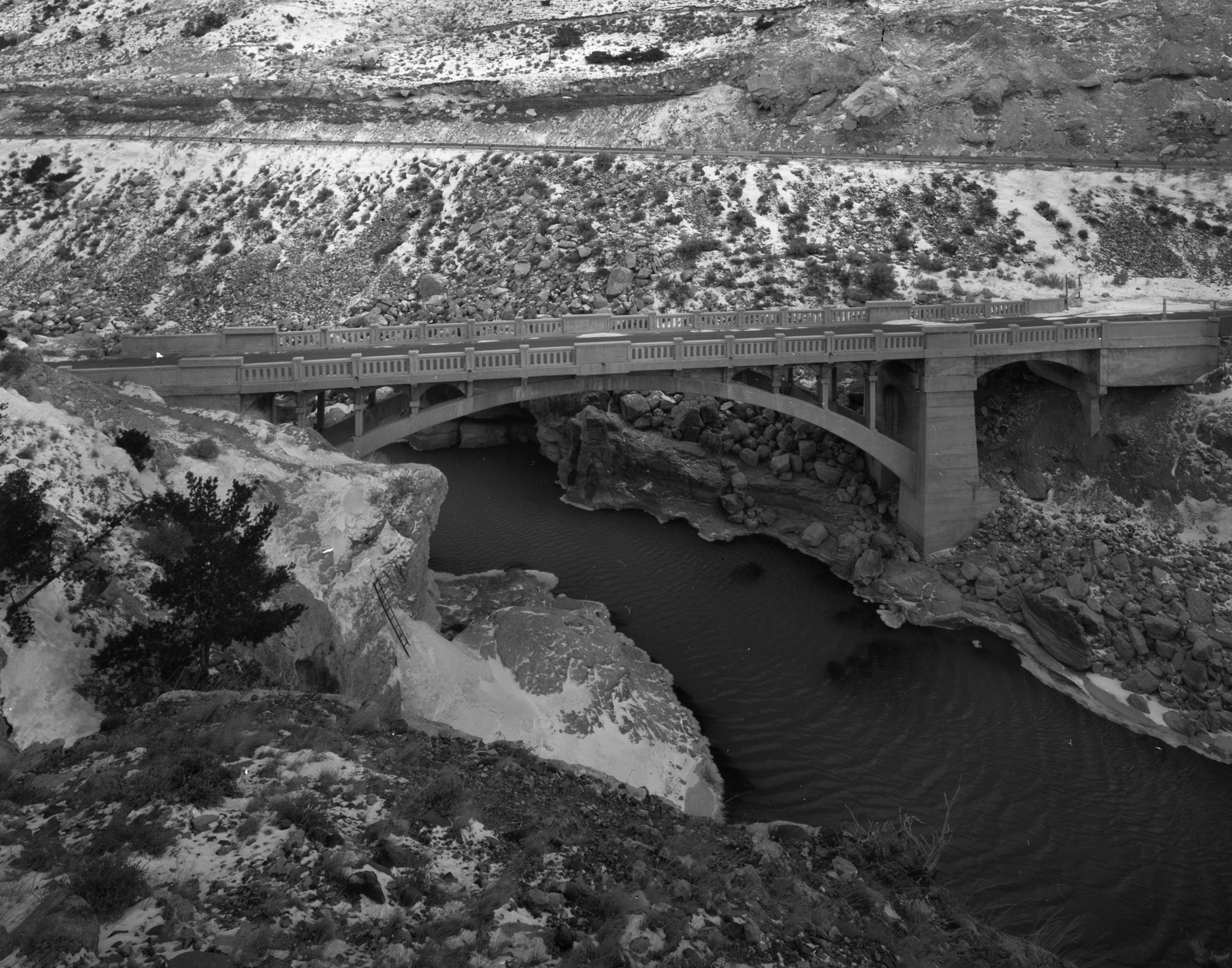
- Hayden Arch Bridge, February 1992

- Location within Wyoming Location within the United States
- Location: Old US 14 / US 16 in Park County, Wyoming; United States
- Nearest city: Cody, Wyoming
- Coordinates: 44°30′37″N 109°8′50″W
- Area: less than one acre
- Built: 1924
- Built by: Crocker Construction Company
- Engineer: C. E. Hayden
- MPS: Vehicular Truss and Arch Bridges in Wyoming TR
- NRHP reference No.: 85000430
- Added to NRHP: February 22, 1985

The Hayden Arch Bridge is a concrete arch bridge on old US 14/US 16 in Park County, Wyoming, United States, that is listed on the National Register of Historic Places {NRHP).

== Description ==
The bridge is the only example of its kind in Wyoming. Built in 1924–25, the single-span bridge spans 115 feet (35 m) with two smaller approach arches between rock canyon walls. The bridge carries the Cody-Yellowstone Highway across the Shoshone River with a shallow open-spandrel central arch and nominally arched approach spans. The bridge is named after C. E. Hayden, an engineer with the Wyoming State Highway Department, who designed the bridge and supervised its construction. It was built by H. S. Crocker of Denver, Colorado.

== See also ==
- National Register of Historic Places listings in Park County, Wyoming
- List of bridges documented by the Historic American Engineering Record in Wyoming
