= ELS Bridge over Big Wind River =

- U.S. National Register of Historic Places
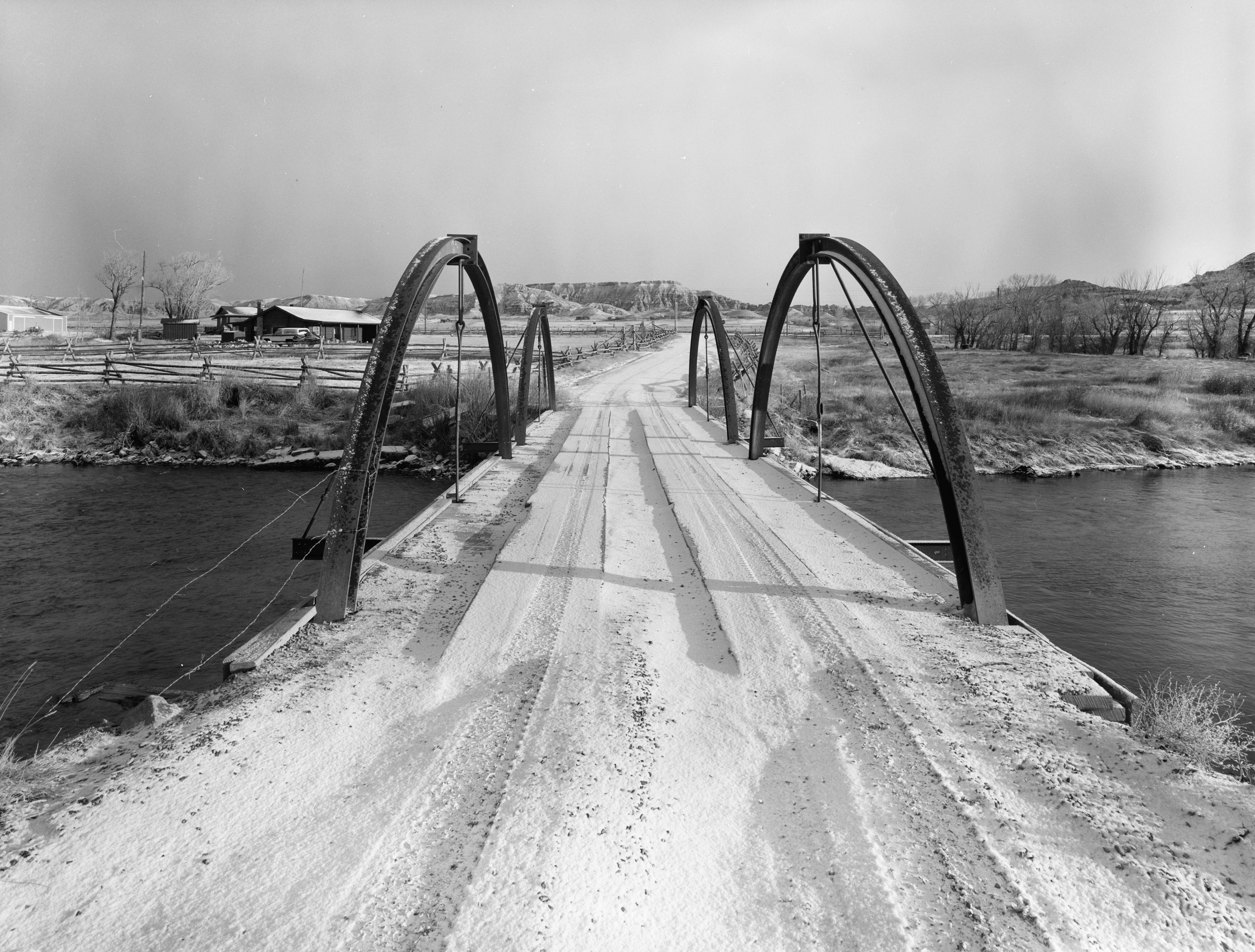
- The bridge in 1982

- Location within Wyoming Location within the United States
- Nearest city: Dubois, Wyoming
- Coordinates: 43°32′47″N 109°40′02″W
- Area: less than one acre
- Built: circa 1920
- MPS: Vehicular Truss and Arch Bridges in Wyoming TR
- NRHP reference No.: 85000420
- Added to NRHP: February 22, 1985

The ELS Bridge over Big Wind River is a pony truss bridge located near Dubois, Wyoming, which carries Fremont County Road CN10-21 across the Big Wind River. The bridge was built circa 1920. Its design is uncommon and merges a kingpost truss with an arched chord. The materials used to build the bridge are also unusual and were likely salvaged; for instance, the arches are made from tunnel sets.

The bridge was added to the National Register of Historic Places on February 22, 1985. It was one of several bridges added to the National Register for their role in the history of Wyoming bridge construction. The bridge was replaced by 2006.

== See also ==
- List of bridges documented by the Historic American Engineering Record in Wyoming
