= EJZ Bridge over Shoshone River =

Historic bridge in Wyoming, United States

- U.S. National Register of Historic Places
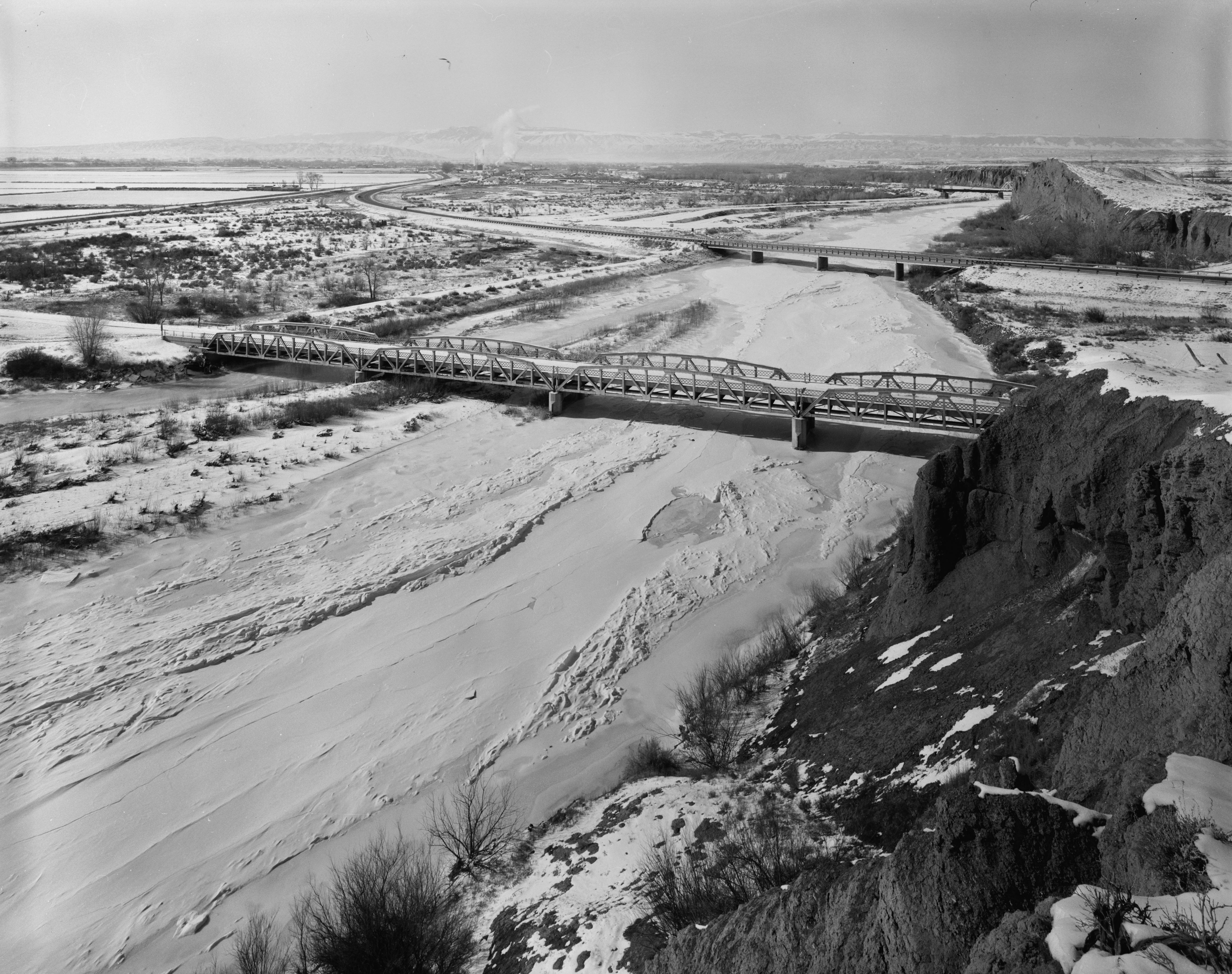
- The bridge in 1982

- Location within Wyoming Location within the United States
- Nearest city: Lovell, Wyoming
- Coordinates: 44°50′17.084″N 108°26′4.967″W
- Area: less than one acre
- Built: 1925–26
- Built by: McGuire & Blakeslee
- Architectural style: Warren pony truss
- MPS: Vehicular Truss and Arch Bridges in Wyoming TR
- NRHP reference No.: 85000413
- Added to NRHP: February 22, 1985

The EJZ Bridge over Shoshone River is a Warren pony truss bridge located near Lovell, Wyoming, which carries Big Horn County Road CN9-111 (Cowley-Lovell Road) across the Shoshone River. Contractors McGuire and Blakeslee built the bridge from 1925 to 1926 using a design by the Wyoming Highway Department. The 389-foot-6-inch (118.72 m) bridge has four spans, the second-most of any truss bridge in Wyoming.

The bridge was added to the National Register of Historic Places on February 22, 1985. It was one of several bridges added to the National Register for their role in the history of Wyoming bridge construction.

== See also ==
- List of bridges documented by the Historic American Engineering Record in Wyoming
