= DOE Bridge over Laramie River =

- U.S. National Register of Historic Places
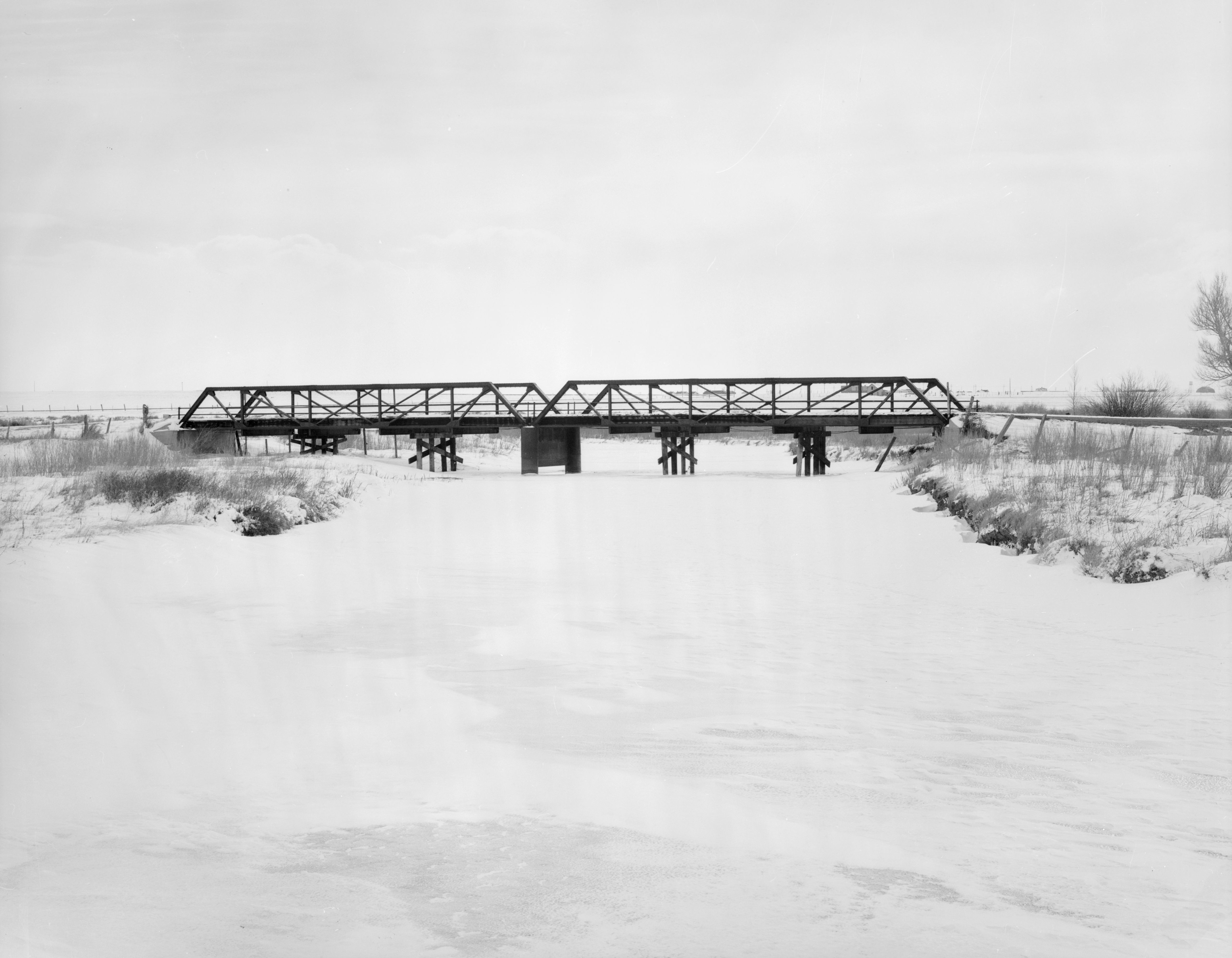
- The bridge in 1982

- Location within Wyoming Location within the United States
- Nearest city: Bosler, Wyoming
- Coordinates: 41°35′30″N 105°41′24″W
- Area: less than one acre
- Built: 1926
- Built by: N. A. Swenson
- Architectural style: Pratt half-hip pony truss
- MPS: Vehicular Truss and Arch Bridges in Wyoming TR
- NRHP reference No.: 85000411
- Added to NRHP: February 22, 1985

The DOE Bridge over Laramie River was a Pratt half-hip pony truss bridge located near Bosler, Wyoming, which carried Albany County Road CNA-740 across the Laramie River. The bridge was built in 1926 by contractor N. A. Swenson; it was originally part of the Lincoln Highway. In 1932, the bridge was replaced and moved to its current location. It was the last two-span Pratt half-hip truss bridge remaining in Wyoming.

The bridge was added to the National Register of Historic Places on February 22, 1985. It was one of several bridges added to the NRHP for its role in the history of Wyoming bridge construction.

== See also ==
- List of bridges documented by the Historic American Engineering Record in Wyoming
