= ETD Bridge over Green River =

- U.S. National Register of Historic Places
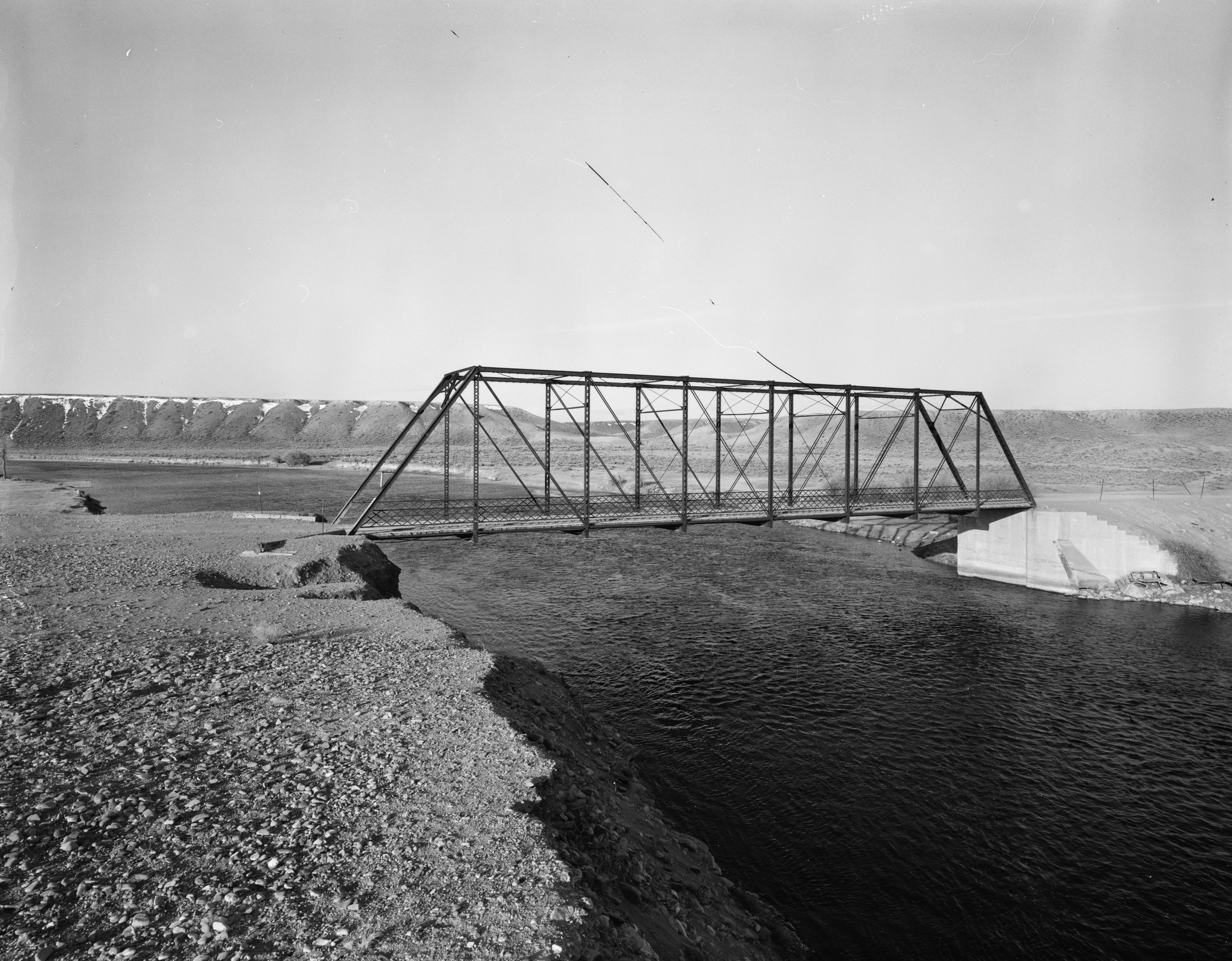
- The historic bridge

- Location within Wyoming Location within the United States
- Location: County Road CN4-8SS, Fontenelle, Wyoming
- Coordinates: 41°58′49″N 110°2′43″W
- Area: less than one acre
- Built: 1913
- Built by: Colorado Bridge & Construction Company
- Architectural style: Pratt through truss
- MPS: Vehicular Truss and Arch Bridges in Wyoming TR
- NRHP reference No.: 85000439
- Added to NRHP: February 22, 1985

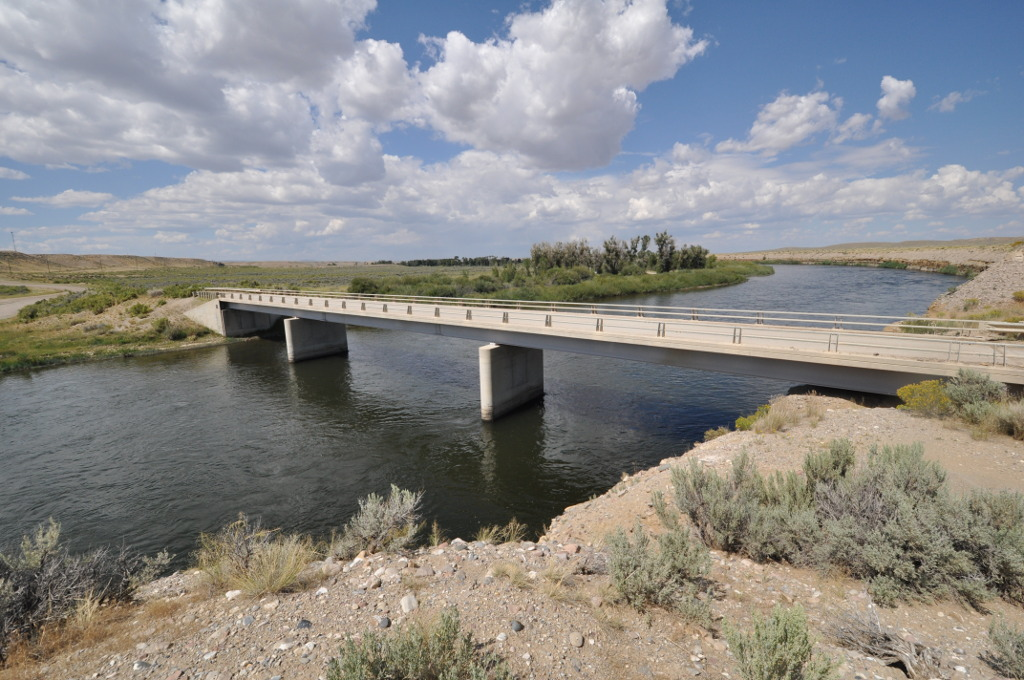
The replacement bridge; the old bridge's abutments are visible adjacent

The ETD Bridge over Green River is a steel girder bridge near Fontenelle, Wyoming, which carries Sweetwater County Road CN4-8SS (Fontenelle Townsite Road) over the Green River. The bridge is a replacement for a historic Pratt through truss bridge built in 1913 by the Colorado Bridge and Construction Company. The 150-foot-long (46 m) bridge was one of the longest Pratt through truss bridges built in the early stages of Wyoming bridge construction.

The bridge was added to the National Register of Historic Places on February 22, 1985. It was one of several bridges added to the NRHP for their role in the history of Wyoming bridge construction.

== See also ==
- List of bridges documented by the Historic American Engineering Record in Wyoming
