= EJE Bridge over Shell Creek =

- U.S. National Register of Historic Places
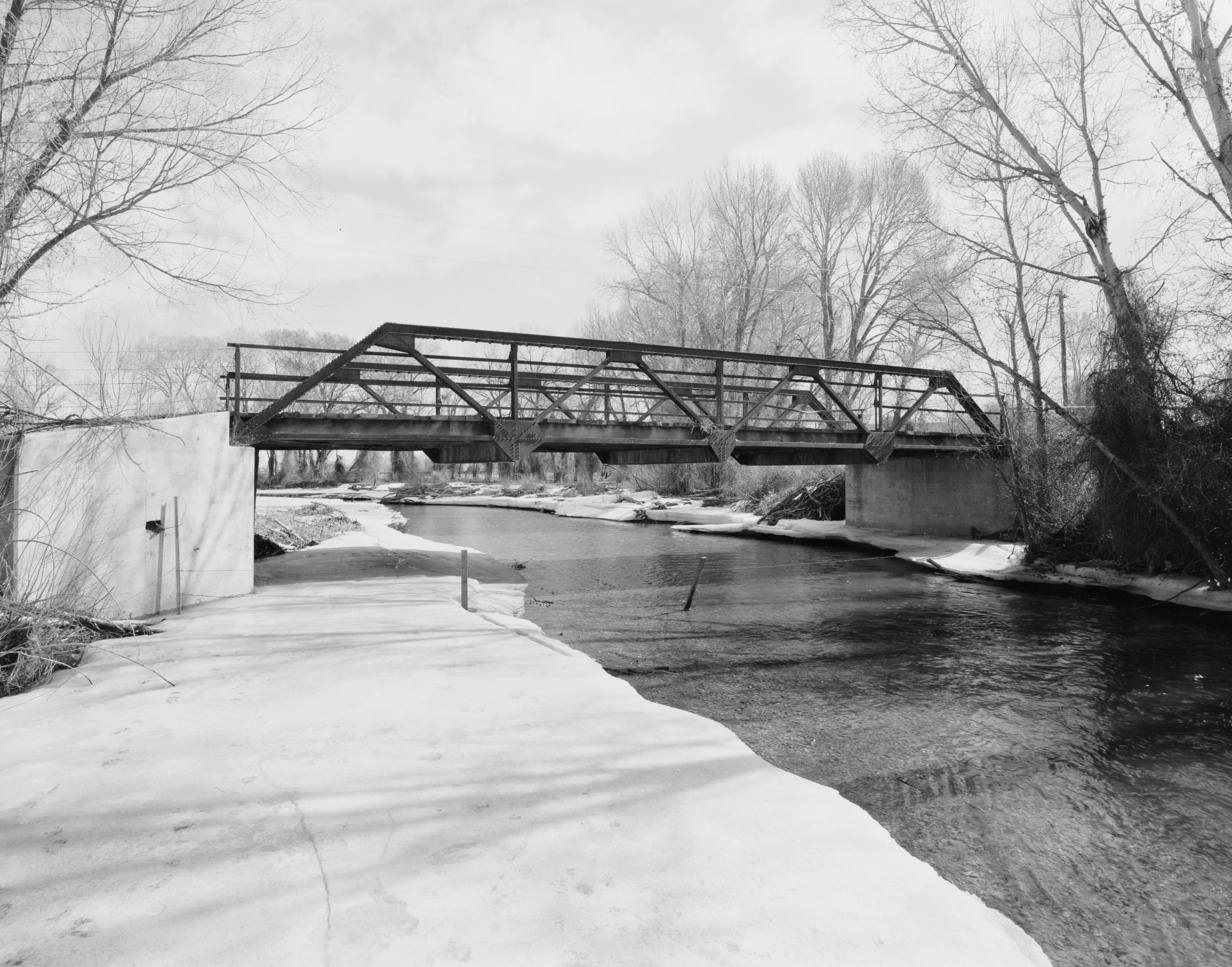
- The bridge in 1982

- Location within Wyoming Location within the United States
- Nearest city: Shell, Wyoming
- Coordinates: 44°32′5″N 107°48′6″W
- Area: less than one acre
- Built: 1920
- Built by: Midland Bridge Company
- Architectural style: Warren pony truss
- MPS: Vehicular Truss and Arch Bridges in Wyoming TR
- NRHP reference No.: 85000415
- Added to NRHP: February 22, 1985

The EJE Bridge over Shell Creek is a Warren pony truss bridge located near Shell, Wyoming, which carries Big Horn County Road CN9-57 across Shell Creek. The bridge was built in 1920 by the Midland Bridge Company, the only firm to bid for the bridge contract. At 60 feet (18 m) long, it is the longest known example of a Warren pony truss bridge in Wyoming.

The bridge was added to the National Register of Historic Places on February 22, 1985. It was one of several bridges added to the National Register for their role in the history of Wyoming bridge construction.

The Bridge was removed and replaced in 2005.

http://bridgehunter.com/wy/big-horn/EJE/

== See also ==
- List of bridges documented by the Historic American Engineering Record in Wyoming
