= ETR Big Island Bridge =

- U.S. National Register of Historic Places
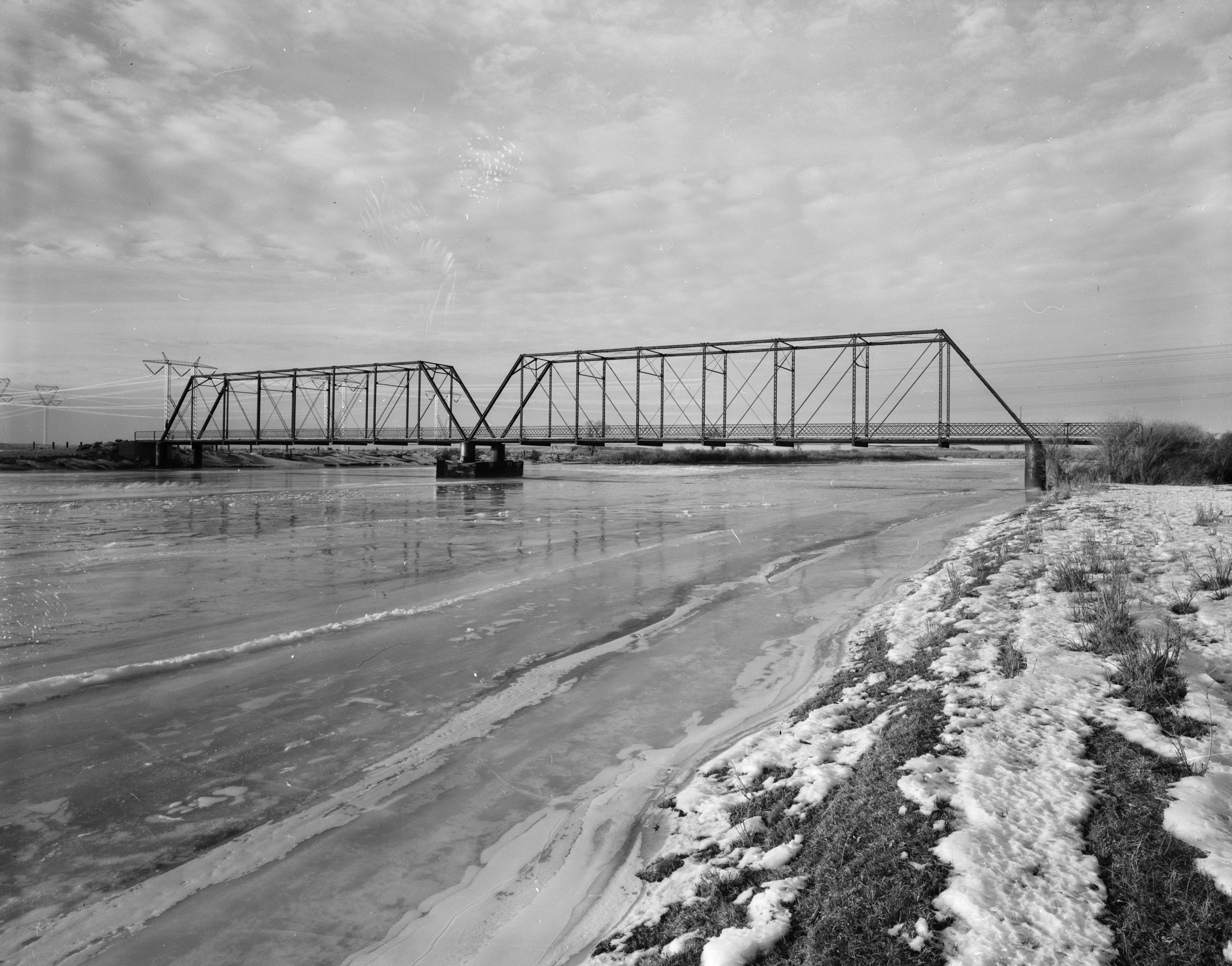
- The bridge in 1982

- Location within Wyoming Location within the United States
- Nearest city: Green River, Wyoming
- Coordinates: 41°45′52″N 109°44′5″W
- Area: less than one acre
- Built: 1909–10
- Built by: Charles G. Sheely
- Architectural style: Pratt through truss
- MPS: Vehicular Truss and Arch Bridges in Wyoming TR
- NRHP reference No.: 85000440
- Added to NRHP: February 22, 1985

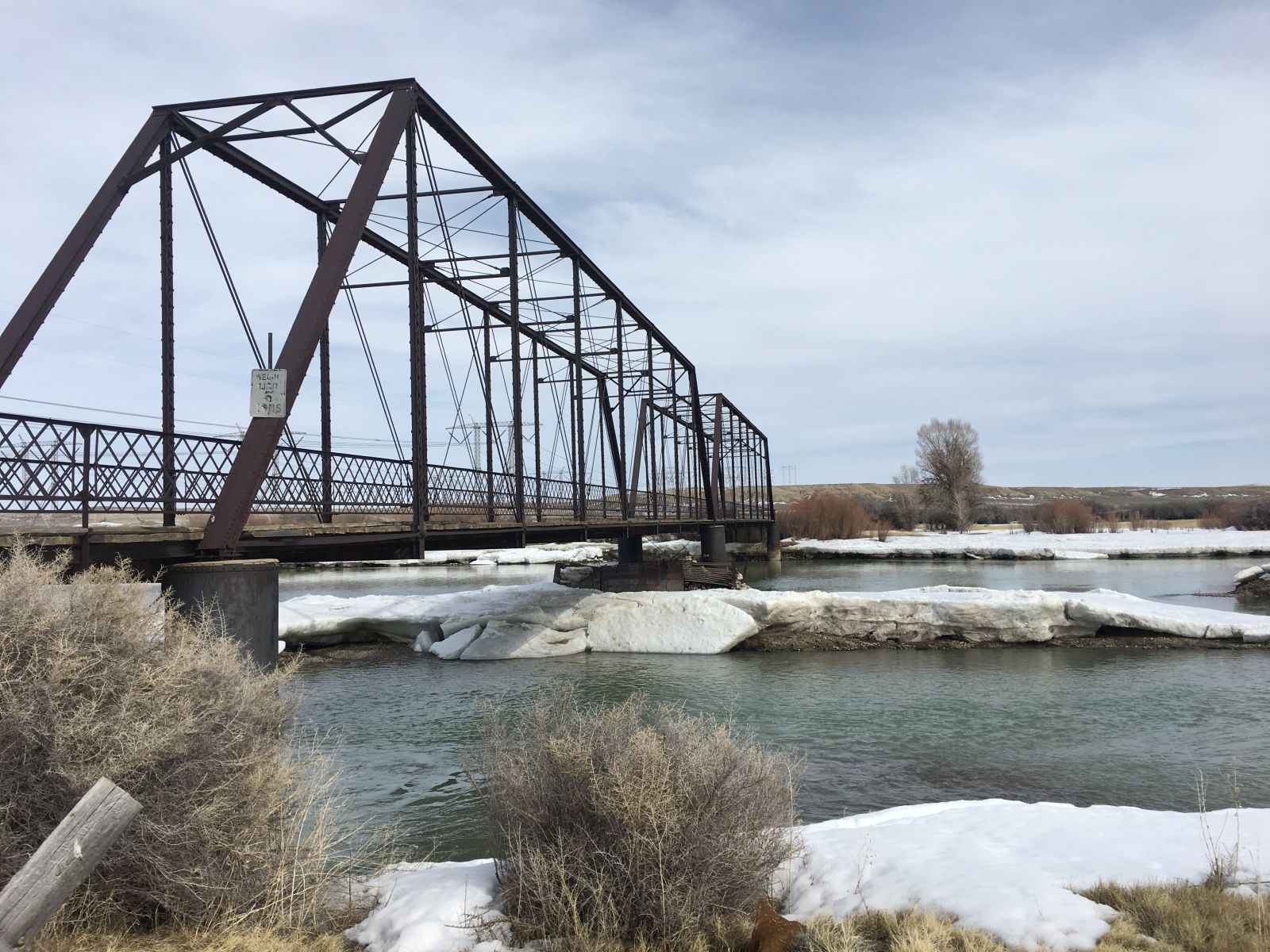
2019 Photo of the Big Island Bridge in Sweetwater County Wyoming

The ETR Big Island Bridge is a Pratt through truss bridge located near Green River, Wyoming, which carries Sweetwater County Road CN4-4 across the Green River. The bridge was built from 1909 to 1910 by contractor Charles G. Sheely. It was named the Big Island Bridge after the Big Island region of Wyoming, which the bridge connected to other parts of the state. The 352-foot (107 m), two-span bridge is one of the older Pratt through truss bridges in Wyoming, and its spans, each 155 feet (47 m) long, are some of the longest on bridges of this design in the state.

The bridge was added to the National Register of Historic Places on February 22, 1985. It was one of several bridges added to the NRHP for their role in the history of Wyoming bridge construction.

== See also ==
- List of bridges documented by the Historic American Engineering Record in Wyoming
