= DFU Elk Mountain Bridge =

- U.S. National Register of Historic Places
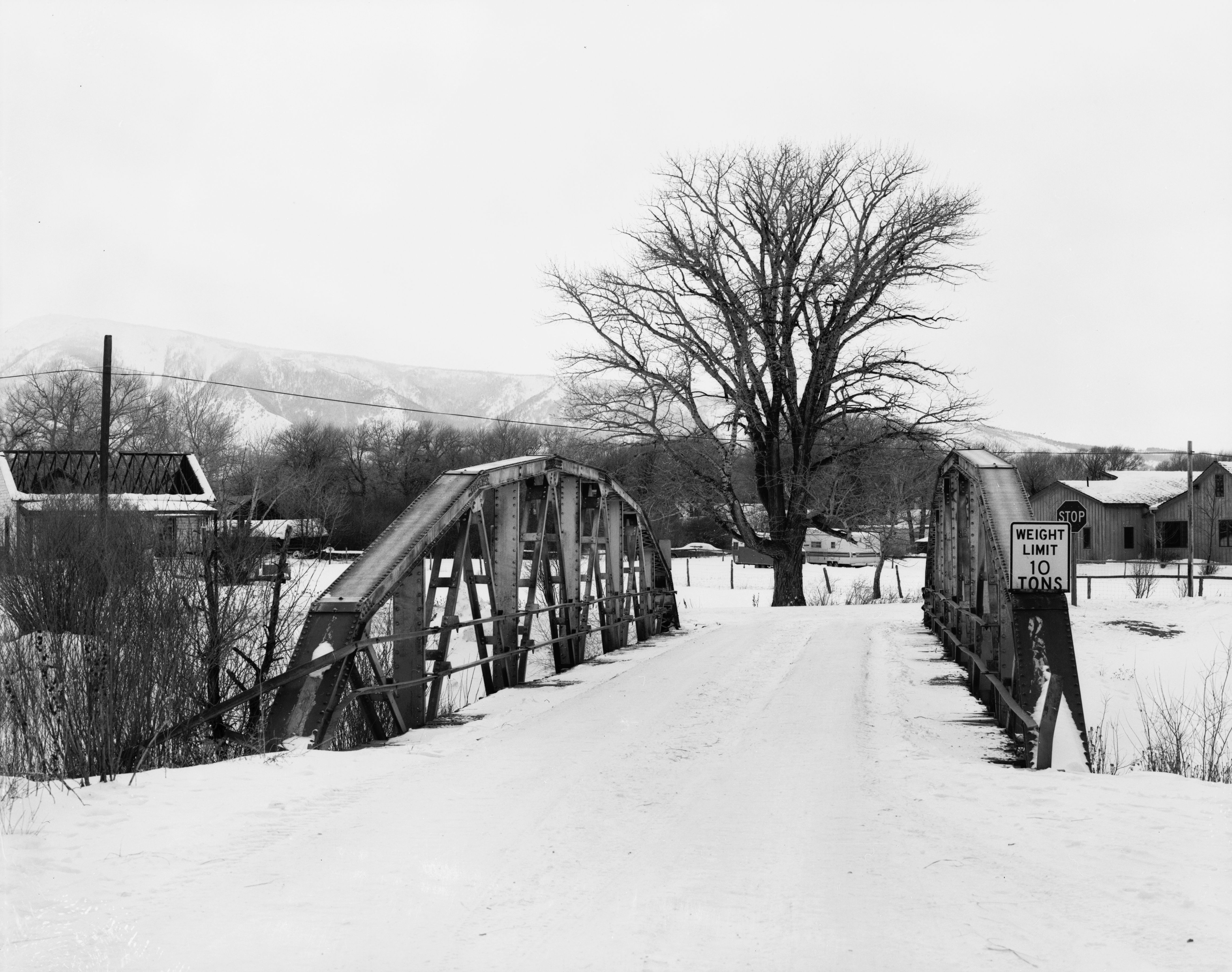
- The bridge in 1982

- Location within Wyoming Location within the United States
- Nearest city: Elk Mountain, Wyoming
- Coordinates: 41°41′13″N 106°24′47″W
- Area: less than one acre
- Built: 1923
- Built by: D. B. Miller
- Architectural style: Warren pony truss
- MPS: Vehicular Truss and Arch Bridges in Wyoming TR
- NRHP reference No.: 85000416
- Added to NRHP: February 22, 1985

The DFU Elk Mountain Bridge was a Warren pony truss bridge located near Elk Mountain, Wyoming, which carried Carbon County Road 120-1 over the Medicine Bow River. The bridge was built in 1823 by contractor D. B. Miller. While the bridge's design is mainly a Warren truss, the top chord of the bridge is reminiscent of a Parker truss. At 102 feet (31 m) long, the bridge is the longest of its design in the Wyoming county highway system.

The bridge was added to the National Register of Historic Places on February 15, 1995. It was one of several bridges added to the NRHP for its role in the history of Wyoming bridge construction. The bridge was replaced between 2017 and 2020.

== See also ==
- List of bridges documented by the Historic American Engineering Record in Wyoming
