= DML Butler Bridge =

- U.S. National Register of Historic Places
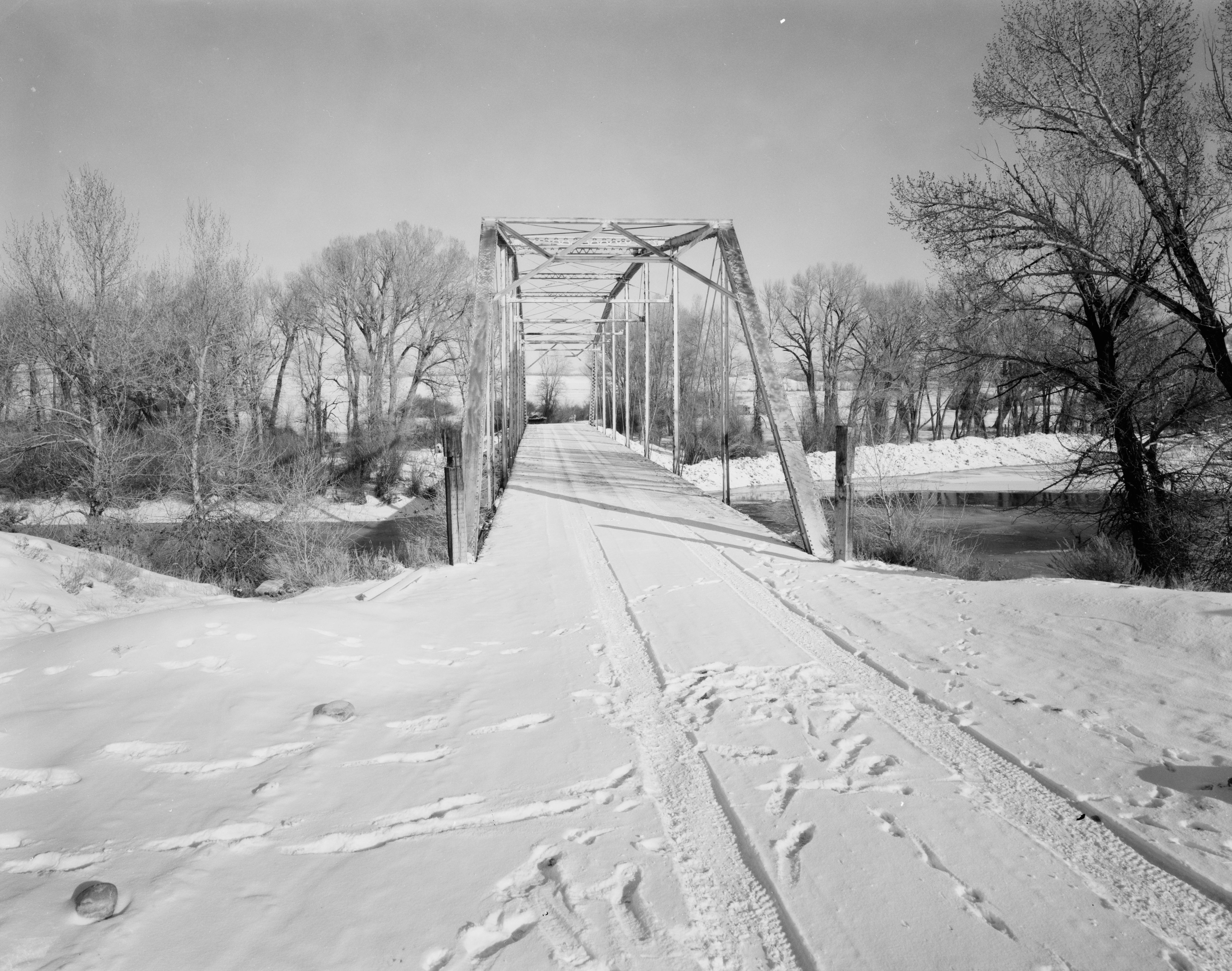
- The DML Butler Bridge in January 1982

- Location within Wyoming Location within the United States
- Nearest city: Encampment, Wyoming; United States
- Coordinates: 41°15′24″N 106°38′24″W
- Area: less than one acre
- Built: 1930
- Built by: Chris O'Neil
- Architectural style: Cammelback through truss
- MPS: Vehicular Truss and Arch Bridges in Wyoming TR
- NRHP reference No.: 85000417
- Added to NRHP: February 22, 1985

The DML Butler Bridge is a historic bridge over the North Platte River in Carbon County, Wyoming, United States, that is listed on the National Register of Historic Places (NRHP).

== Description ==
The Camelback through truss bridge is located near Encampment and carries County Road 203. Contractor Chris O'Neil built the bridge in 1920 to replace a wooden bridge built in 1905. The bridge is one of two Camelback truss bridges remaining on a Wyoming county road and, at 170 feet (52 m) long, is the longer of the two.

The bridge was added to the NRHP on February 22, 1985. It was one of several bridges added to the NRHP for its role in the history of Wyoming bridge construction.

== See also ==
- National Register of Historic Places listings in Carbon County, Wyoming
- List of bridges documented by the Historic American Engineering Record in Wyoming
