= BMU Bridge over Wind River =

Bridge in Wyoming, United States

- U.S. National Register of Historic Places
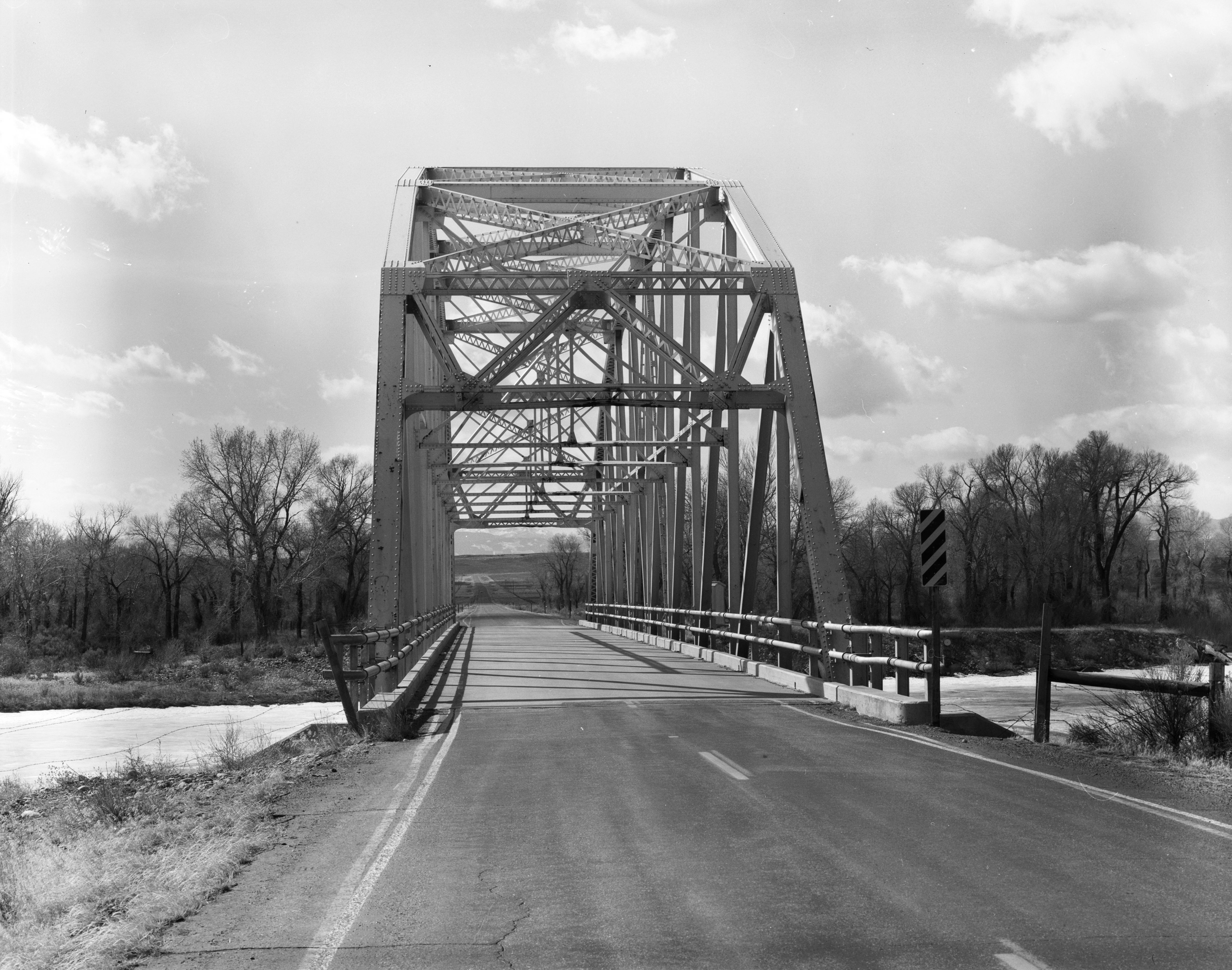
- The bridge in 1982

- Location within Wyoming Location within the United States
- Nearest city: Ethete, Wyoming
- Coordinates: 43°8′36″N 108°42′29″W
- Area: less than one acre
- Built: c. 1935
- Architectural style: Parker through truss
- MPS: Vehicular Truss and Arch Bridges in Wyoming TR
- NRHP reference No.: 85000421
- Added to NRHP: February 22, 1985

The BMU Bridge over Wind River is a Parker through truss bridge located near Ethete, Wyoming, that carries Wyoming Highway 132 across the Wind River. The bridge was built circa 1935 as one of seven Parker truss bridges commissioned by the Wyoming Highway Department. It was moved to its current location in 1953–54. At 283 feet (86 m) long, the bridge is the longest single-span truss bridge still used in Wyoming.

The bridge was added to the National Register of Historic Places on February 22, 1985. It was one of several bridges added to the NRHP for their role in the history of Wyoming bridge construction.

== See also ==
- List of bridges documented by the Historic American Engineering Record in Wyoming
