= ENP Bridge over Green River =

- U.S. National Register of Historic Places
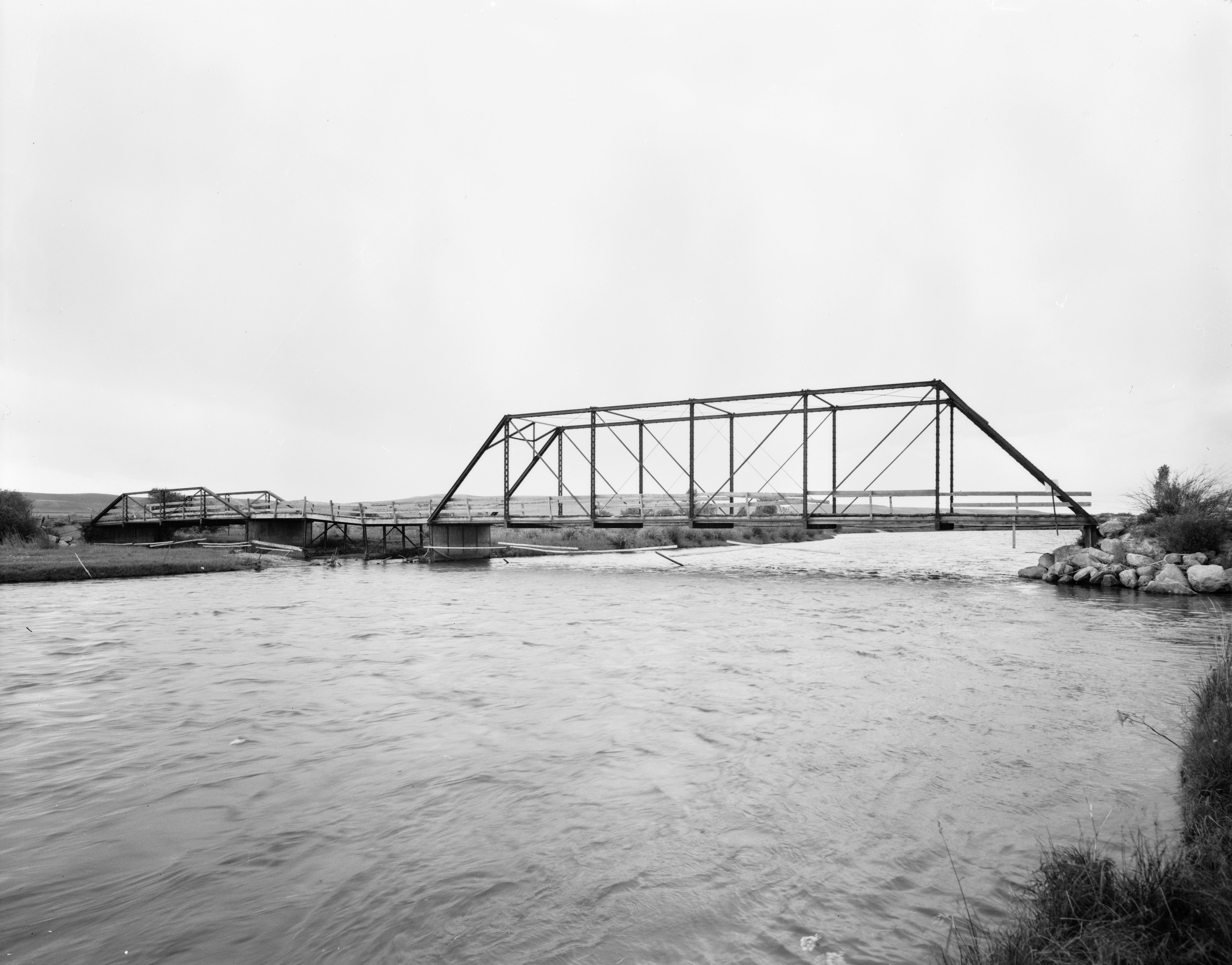
- The bridge in 1982

- Location within Wyoming Location within the United States
- Nearest city: Daniel, Wyoming
- Coordinates: 42°46′46″N 109°58′10″W
- Area: less than one acre
- Built: circa 1905
- Built by: Western Bridge and Construction Company
- Architectural style: Pratt truss through & pony
- MPS: Vehicular Truss and Arch Bridges in Wyoming TR
- NRHP reference No.: 85000438
- Added to NRHP: February 22, 1985

The ENP Bridge over Green River is a historic bridge located near Daniel, Wyoming, in the United States, which carries Sublette County Road CN23-145 across the Green River. The Western Bridge and Construction Company built the bridge circa 1905. The 221-foot-11-inch (67.64 m) bridge has two spans, both Pratt trusses; the longer span is a Pratt through truss, while the shorter is a Pratt pony truss. The use of both through and pony trusses in the same bridge was uncommon in Wyoming, and the bridge is the only surviving example of a Pratt truss bridge in this style.

The bridge was added to the National Register of Historic Places on February 22, 1985. It was one of several bridges added to the NRHP for its role in the history of Wyoming bridge construction.

== See also ==
- List of bridges documented by the Historic American Engineering Record in Wyoming
