= DMJ Pick Bridge =

- U.S. National Register of Historic Places
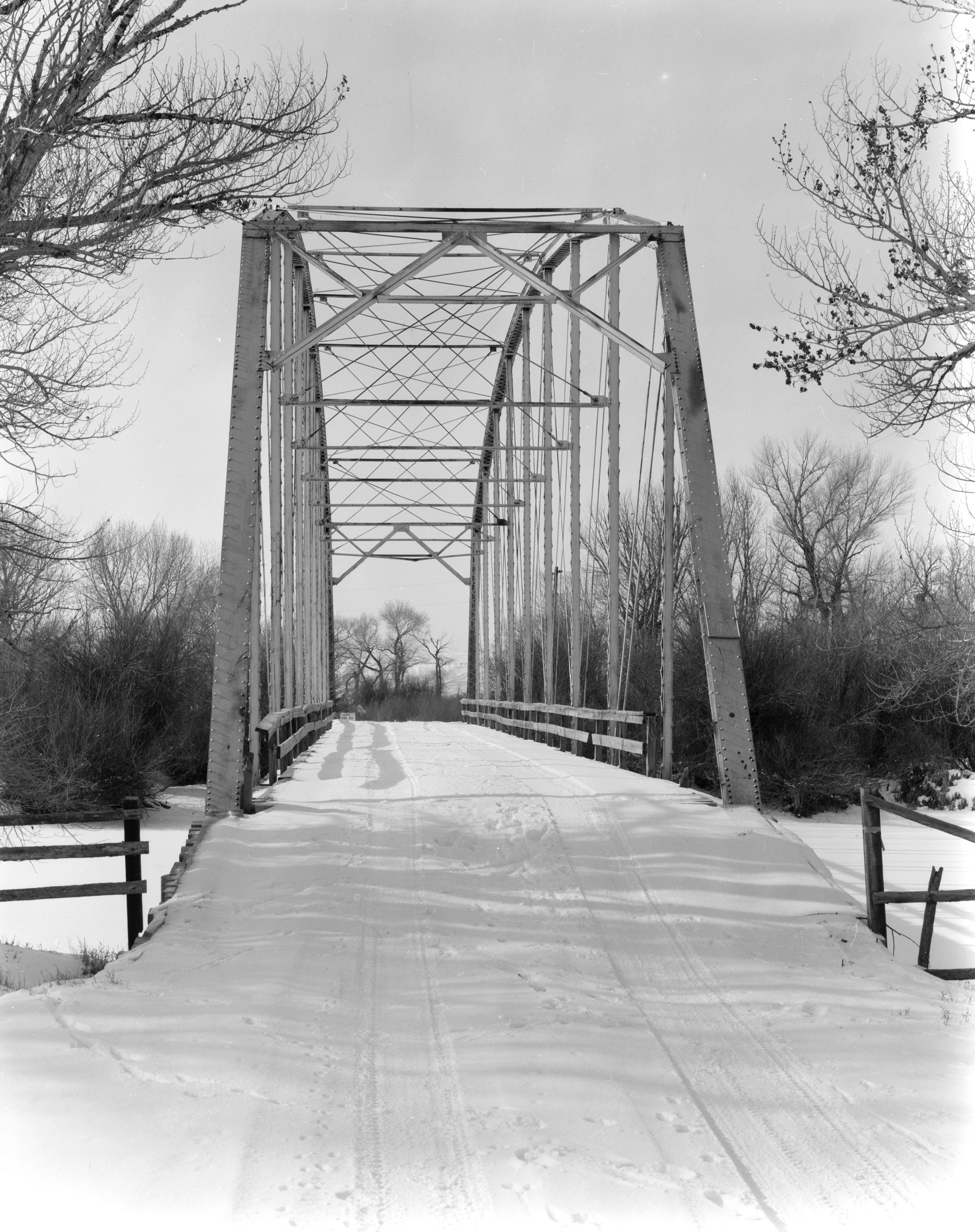
- The bridge in 1982

- Location within Wyoming Location within the United States
- Nearest city: Saratoga, Wyoming
- Coordinates: 41°32′22″N 106°52′55″W
- Area: less than one acre
- Built: 1909–10
- Built by: Charles G. Sheely
- Architectural style: Parker through truss
- MPS: Vehicular Truss and Arch Bridges in Wyoming TR
- NRHP reference No.: 85000418
- Added to NRHP: February 22, 1985

The DMJ Pick Bridge is a Parker through truss bridge located near Saratoga, Wyoming, which carries Carbon County Road CN6-508 across the North Platte River. The bridge was built from 1909 to 1910 by contractor Charles G. Sheely; it was originally located south of Fort Steele. In 1934, the bridge was moved up the river to its current location, as a new bridge had been built at its original site five years earlier. The bridge is the only Parker truss bridge remaining in Wyoming, after the Arvada Bridge was replaced in 1990.

The bridge was added to the National Register of Historic Places on February 22, 1985. It was one of several bridges added to the NRHP for its role in the history of Wyoming bridge construction.

== See also ==
- EAU Arvada Bridge, the other remaining Parker truss bridge in Wyoming
- List of bridges documented by the Historic American Engineering Record in Wyoming
