= Monarch, Wyoming =

- Unincorporated community
- Location within Wyoming
- Coordinates: 44°54′11″N 107°02′06″W
- Country: United States
- State: Wyoming
- County: Sheridan
- Elevation: 3,655 ft (1,114 m)
- Time zone: UTC-7 (Mountain (MST))
  - Summer (DST): UTC-6 (MDT)
- Area code: 307
- GNIS feature ID: 1597415

Monarch is an unincorporated community in Sheridan County, Wyoming, United States. Monarch is located along Interstate 90, 8.3 miles (13.4 km) north-northwest of Sheridan. It was founded in 1903 as one of many coal company towns in the area. It was all but abandoned in 1953. Monarch is 3,650 feet (1,113 m) above sea level. Monarch area code (307).
