= Bessemer Bend, Wyoming =

Census-designated place in Natrona County, Wyoming, United States

- Census-designated place
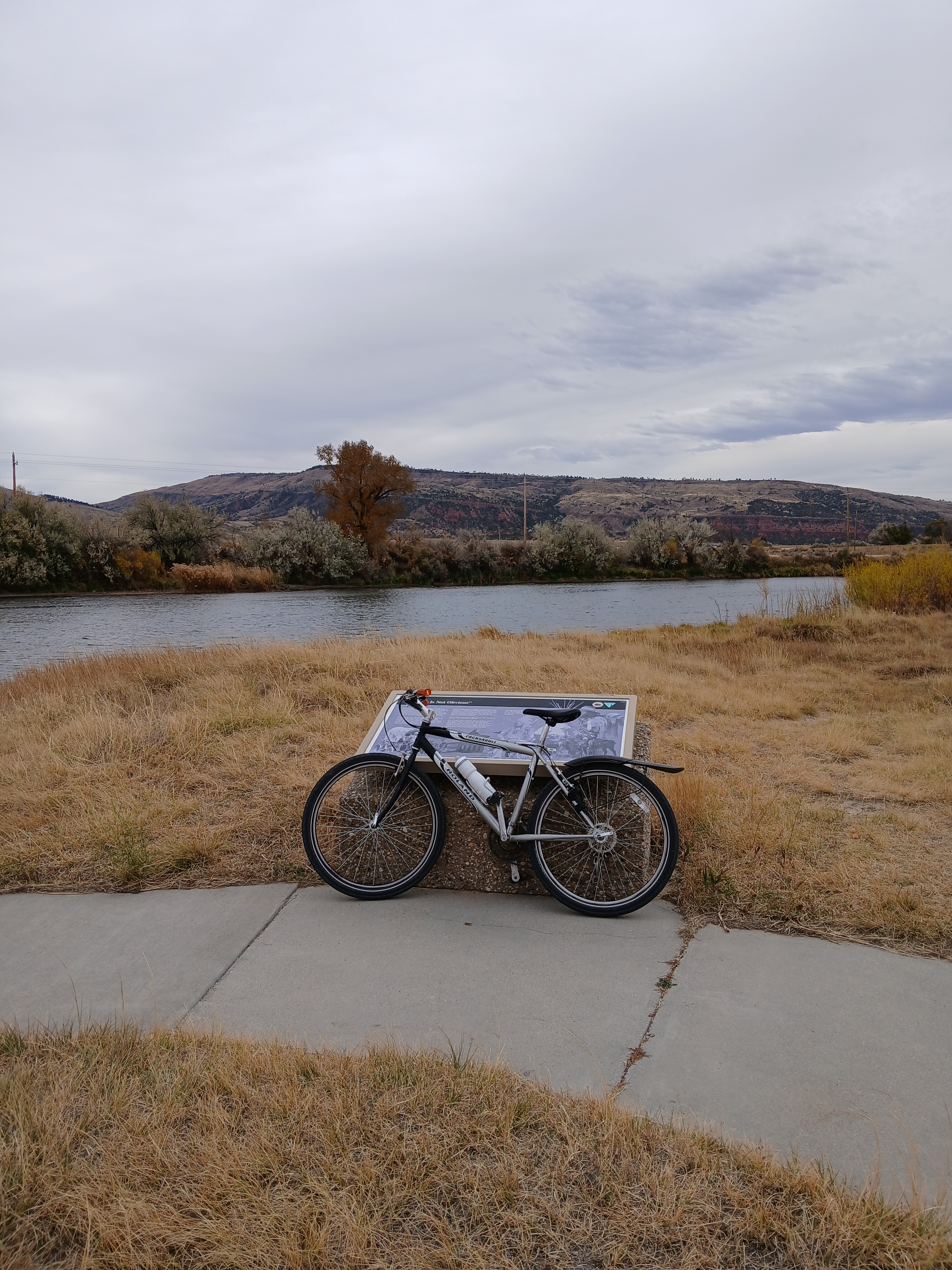
- Bessemer Bend, October 2024

- Location within the state of Wyoming
- Coordinates: 42°45′05″N 106°31′12″W
- Country: United States
- State: Wyoming
- County: Natrona

Area
  - Total: 1.6 sq mi (4.1 km^{2})
  - Land: 1.6 sq mi (4.1 km^{2})
  - Water: 0.0 sq mi (0 km^{2})
- Elevation: 5,236 ft (1,596 m)

Population (2010)
  - Total: 199
  - Density: 120/sq mi (48/km^{2})
- Time zone: UTC-7 (Mountain (MST))
  - Summer (DST): UTC-6 (MDT)
- Area code: 307
- FIPS code: 56-06407
- GNIS feature ID: 2407833

Bessemer Bend is a census-designated place (CDP) in Natrona County, Wyoming, United States. It is part of the Casper, Wyoming Metropolitan Statistical Area. The population was 199 at the 2010 census.

== Geography ==
According to the United States Census Bureau, the CDP has a total area of 1.6 square miles (4.0 km^{2}), all land.

== Demographics ==
As of the census of 2000, there were 170 people, 72 households, and 45 families residing in the CDP. The population density was 109.0 people per square mile (42.1/km^{2}). There were 74 housing units at an average density of 47.5/sq mi (18.3/km^{2}). The racial makeup of the CDP was 93.53% White, 2.94% Native American, 2.94% from other races, and 0.59% from two or more races. Hispanic or Latino people of any race were 5.29% of the population.

There were 72 households, out of which 27.8% had children under the age of 18 living with them, 55.6% were married couples living together, 4.2% had a female householder with no husband present, and 37.5% were non-families. 29.2% of all households were made up of individuals, and 11.1% had someone living alone who was 65 years of age or older. The average household size was 2.36 and the average family size was 3.02.

In the CDP, the population was spread out, with 22.4% under the age of 18, 8.2% from 18 to 24, 22.9% from 25 to 44, 34.1% from 45 to 64, and 12.4% who were 65 years of age or older. The median age was 44 years. For every 100 females, there were 117.9 males. For every 100 females age 18 and over, there were 135.7 males.

The median income for a household in the CDP was $48,571, and the median income for a family was $50,625. Males had a median income of $22,344 versus $17,321 for females. The per capita income for the CDP was $24,971. None of the families and 2.9% of the population were living below the poverty line, including no under eighteens and 10.2% of those over 64.

== See also ==
- List of census-designated places in Wyoming
