= Riverview, Wyoming =

Riverview
- Unincorporated community
- Location within the state of Wyoming Riverview (the United States)
- Coordinates: 43°25′15″N 104°11′43″W
- Country: United States
- State: Wyoming
- County: Niobrara
- Elevation: 3,753 ft (1,144 m)
- Time zone: UTC-7 (Mountain (MST))
  - Summer (DST): UTC-6 (MST)
- GNIS feature ID: 1597473

Riverview was an unincorporated community located in Niobrara County, Wyoming, United States.
