= Fontenelle, Wyoming =

Census-designated place in Lincoln County, Wyoming, United States

- Census-designated place
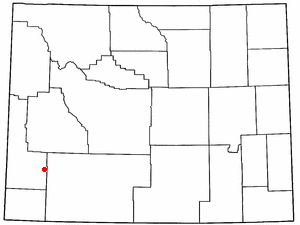
- Location of Fontenelle, Wyoming
- Coordinates: 42°00′12″N 110°03′46″W
- Country: United States
- State: Wyoming
- County: Lincoln

Area
  - Total: 3.6 sq mi (9.3 km^{2})
  - Land: 3.4 sq mi (8.9 km^{2})
  - Water: 0.15 sq mi (0.4 km^{2})
- Elevation: 6,490 ft (1,980 m)

Population (2020)
  - Total: 5
  - Density: 1.5/sq mi (0.56/km^{2})
- Time zone: UTC-7 (Mountain (MST))
  - Summer (DST): UTC-6 (MDT)
- ZIP code: 83101
- Area code: 307
- FIPS code: 56-27650
- GNIS feature ID: 2408223

Fontenelle is a census-designated place (CDP) along the Green River in Lincoln County, Wyoming, United States. The population was 5 at the 2020 census.

== Demographics ==
As of the census of 2000, there were 19 people, 5 households, and 5 families residing in the CDP. The population density was 5.5 people per square mile (2.1/km^{2}). There were 8 housing units at an average density of 2.3/sq mi (0.9/km^{2}). The racial makeup of the CDP was 100.00% White.

There were 5 households, out of which 80.0% had children under the age of 18 living with them, 100.0% were married couples living together, and 0.0% were non-families. No households were made up of individuals, and none had someone living alone who was 65 years of age or older. The average household size was 3.80 and the average family size was 3.80.

In the CDP, the population was spread out, with 42.1% under the age of 18, 5.3% from 18 to 24, 31.6% from 25 to 44, and 21.1% from 45 to 64. The median age was 30 years. For every 100 females, there were 72.7 males. For every 100 females age 18 and over, there were 83.3 males.

The median income for a household in the CDP was $0, and the median income for a family was $0. Males had a median income of $0 versus $0 for females. The per capita income for the CDP was $0. There are 100.0% of families living below the poverty line and 100.0% of the population, including no under eighteens and none of those over 64.

== Geography ==
According to the United States Census Bureau, the CDP has a total area of 3.6 square miles (9.3 km^{2}), of which 3.5 square miles (8.9 km^{2}) is land and 0.1 square mile (0.4 km^{2}) (3.90%) is water.

=== Climate ===
According to the Köppen Climate Classification system, Fontenelle has a cold semi-arid climate, abbreviated "BSk" on climate maps. The hottest temperature recorded in Fontenelle was 100 °F (38 °C) on July 22, 2007, while the coldest temperature recorded was −46 °F (−43 °C) on December 31, 1978, and February 2, 1985.

Climate data for Fontenelle Dam, Wyoming, 1991–2020 normals, extremes 1963–present
Month	Jan	Feb	Mar	Apr	May	Jun	Jul	Aug	Sep	Oct	Nov	Dec	Year
Record high °F (°C)	53 (12)	57 (14)	75 (24)	79 (26)	87 (31)	94 (34)	100 (38)	95 (35)	93 (34)	81 (27)	70 (21)	60 (16)	100 (38)
Mean maximum °F (°C)	39.5 (4.2)	42.5 (5.8)	56.2 (13.4)	68.0 (20.0)	76.2 (24.6)	84.9 (29.4)	90.2 (32.3)	88.3 (31.3)	81.5 (27.5)	71.5 (21.9)	56.5 (13.6)	43.1 (6.2)	90.7 (32.6)
Mean daily maximum °F (°C)	28.5 (−1.9)	31.3 (−0.4)	42.5 (5.8)	52.3 (11.3)	62.7 (17.1)	74.0 (23.3)	83.3 (28.5)	81.5 (27.5)	71.1 (21.7)	56.8 (13.8)	40.8 (4.9)	28.8 (−1.8)	54.5 (12.5)
Daily mean °F (°C)	14.1 (−9.9)	17.2 (−8.2)	28.6 (−1.9)	36.8 (2.7)	46.9 (8.3)	56.2 (13.4)	64.1 (17.8)	62.3 (16.8)	52.5 (11.4)	39.6 (4.2)	25.6 (−3.6)	14.4 (−9.8)	38.2 (3.4)
Mean daily minimum °F (°C)	−0.2 (−17.9)	3.1 (−16.1)	14.7 (−9.6)	21.2 (−6.0)	31.0 (−0.6)	38.4 (3.6)	44.8 (7.1)	43.1 (6.2)	33.8 (1.0)	22.5 (−5.3)	10.4 (−12.0)	−0.1 (−17.8)	21.9 (−5.6)
Mean minimum °F (°C)	−20.7 (−29.3)	−17.9 (−27.7)	−3.8 (−19.9)	10.0 (−12.2)	18.6 (−7.4)	27.8 (−2.3)	34.8 (1.6)	32.2 (0.1)	21.3 (−5.9)	7.1 (−13.8)	−9.2 (−22.9)	−21.5 (−29.7)	−28.4 (−33.6)
Record low °F (°C)	−43 (−42)	−46 (−43)	−33 (−36)	−9 (−23)	6 (−14)	14 (−10)	21 (−6)	17 (−8)	4 (−16)	−23 (−31)	−29 (−34)	−46 (−43)	−46 (−43)
Average precipitation inches (mm)	0.35 (8.9)	0.36 (9.1)	0.50 (13)	0.78 (20)	1.43 (36)	0.83 (21)	0.46 (12)	0.73 (19)	0.85 (22)	0.66 (17)	0.34 (8.6)	0.26 (6.6)	7.55 (193.2)
Average snowfall inches (cm)	5.4 (14)	6.6 (17)	3.8 (9.7)	2.2 (5.6)	0.6 (1.5)	0.0 (0.0)	0.0 (0.0)	0.0 (0.0)	0.0 (0.0)	1.3 (3.3)	2.1 (5.3)	4.5 (11)	26.5 (67.4)
Average precipitation days (≥ 0.01 in)	3.4	3.8	4.6	5.4	8.2	5.0	4.5	5.5	5.7	4.4	3.4	3.8	57.7
Average snowy days (≥ 0.1 in)	2.8	2.9	1.7	1.0	0.2	0.0	0.0	0.0	0.1	0.7	1.9	3.3	14.6
Source 1: NOAA
Source 2: National Weather Service

== Education ==
The CDP is divided between the following school districts: Most of it is in Lincoln County School District 1, while a portion is in Sublette County School District 9.

== See also ==
- List of census-designated places in Wyoming
