= Morton, Wyoming =

Unincorporated community in Fremont County, Wyoming, United States

- Unincorporated community
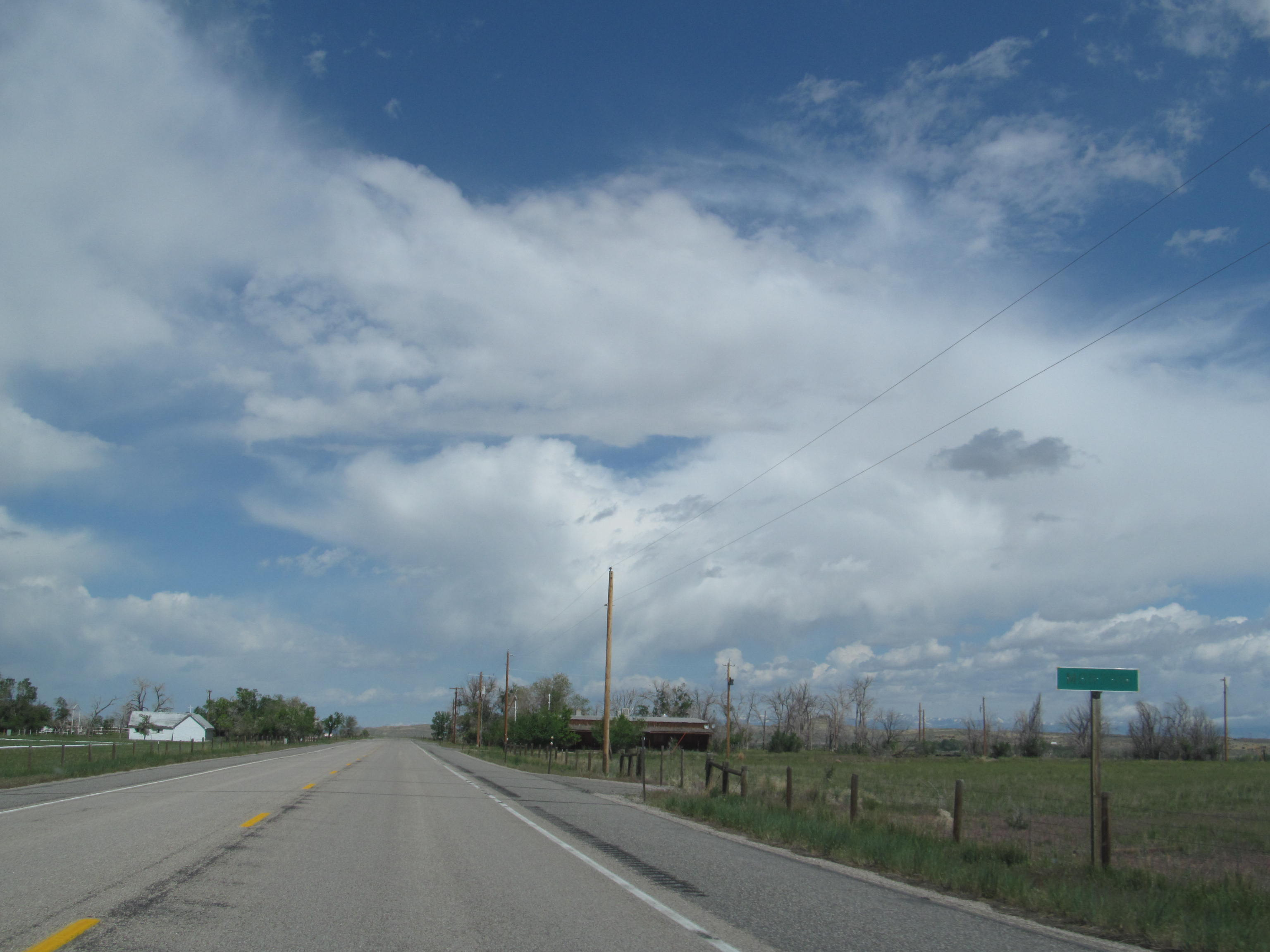
- North along U.S. Route 26 entering Morton, June 2014

- Location within Wyoming Location within the United States
- Coordinates: 43°12′02″N 108°46′28″W
- Country: United States
- State: Wyoming
- County: Fremont
- Elevation: 5,515 ft (1,681 m)
- Time zone: UTC-7 (Mountain (MST))
  - Summer (DST): UTC-6 (MDT)
- Area code: 307
- GNIS feature ID: 1597419

Morton is an unincorporated community in Fremont County, Wyoming, United States.

== Descriptipon ==
The community is located along U.S. Route 26 on the south shore of the Pilot Butte Reservoir on the Wind River Indian Reservation, 23.3 miles (37.5 km) west-northwest of Riverton.
