= Arvada, Wyoming =

Census-designated place in Sheridan County, Wyoming, United States

- Census-designated place
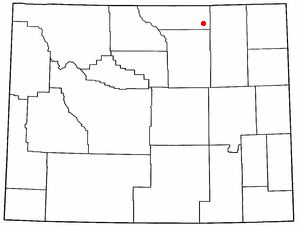
- Location of Arvada, Wyoming
- Coordinates: 44°39′48″N 106°07′54″W
- Country: United States
- State: Wyoming
- County: Sheridan

Area
  - Total: 1.75 sq mi (4.5 km^{2})
  - Land: 1.75 sq mi (4.5 km^{2})
  - Water: 0.0 sq mi (0 km^{2})
- Elevation: 3,842 ft (1,171 m)

Population (2020)
  - Total: 33
  - Density: 19/sq mi (7.3/km^{2})
- Time zone: UTC-7 (Mountain (MST))
  - Summer (DST): UTC-6 (MDT)
- ZIP code: 82831
- Area code: 307
- FIPS code: 56-03725
- GNIS feature ID: 2407770

Arvada is a census-designated place in Sheridan County, Wyoming, United States. The population was 33 at the 2020 census.

According to the United States Census Bureau, the CDP has a total area of 1.75 square miles (4.5 square kilometres), all land.

== Climate ==
According to the Köppen Climate Classification system, Arvada has a semi-arid climate, abbreviated "BSk" on climate maps.

== History ==
Arvada, Wyoming, is located on the west bank of the Powder River, about fifty miles northwest of Gillette. From 1888 to 1891, a stage line that ran from Sundance to Buffalo crossed the Powder River on a ferry boat at the future site of Arvada. The town of Suggs, Wyoming, was established on the east bank of the river in 1891, and a post office opened September 14, 1891. Suggs was named for a local rancher.

During the summer of 1892, railroad crews working on the Burlington and Missouri River Railroad, built a bridge across the Powder River at Suggs, although the railroad had only reached Gillette at that point in time. Suggs quickly became an "end of tracks town" with bars, brothels, and gambling establishments.

During the Johnson County War of 1892, a group of Buffalo Soldiers from Fort Robinson took the train to Gillette, and marched to Suggs. There the black soldiers built "Camp Bettens" in spite of a hostile and racist local population. One black soldier was killed and two wounded in gun battles with locals in a fight known as the "Battle of Suggs." Camp Bettens was built in mid-June 1892, and was abandoned in mid-November.

When the railroad reached Suggs in 1892, railroad officials planned the new town of Arvada on the west bank of the Powder River, and Suggs was abandoned. The post office was moved from Suggs to Arvada on July 20, 1893.

The Arvada area has deposits of coal at a shallow depth, and in the early days, local wells produced natural gas in solution in the drinking water. The drinking water would catch on fire, and could burn.

In the first decade of the 21st century, Arvada was included by the United States Census Bureau in a census designated place which was then named for the town. In 2011, the US Postal Service proposed closing the Arvada post office along with 42 other Wyoming post offices.

== Demographics ==
At the 2000 census, there were 33 people, 18 households and 9 families residing in the CDP. The population density was 15.4 per square mile (6.0/km^{2}). There were 26 housing units at an average density of 12.1/sq mi (4.7/km^{2}). The racial makeup of the CDP was 84.85% White, 6.06% Native American, and 9.09% from two or more races.

There were 18 households, of which 27.8% had children under the age of 18 living with them, 27.8% were married couples living together, 16.7% had a female householder with no husband present, and 50.0% were non-families. 44.4% of all households were made up of individuals, and 22.2% had someone living alone who was 65 years of age or older. The average household size was 1.83 and the average family size was 2.56.

21.2% of the population were under the age of 18, 6.1% from 18 to 24, 24.2% from 25 to 44, 27.3% from 45 to 64, and 21.2% who were 65 years of age or older. The median age was 44 years. For every 100 females, there were 120.0 males. For every 100 females age 18 and over, there were 136.4 males. The median family income was $87,857. The median income for all workers was $48,333. Females had a median income of $36,786. Male medium income was unreported. The per capita income for the CDP was $43,343. There were no families living below the poverty line. Five people reported Social Security income and none were on SSI. All workers were reported as being employed by governments.

== Education ==
Public education in the community of Arvada is provided by Sheridan County School District #3. Schools serving the town include Arvada Elementary School (grades K-6), Arvada-Clearmont Junior High School (grades 7–8), and Arvada-Clearmont High School District (grades 9–12).

== See also ==
- List of census-designated places in Wyoming
