= National Register of Historic Places listings in Big Horn County, Wyoming =

Location of Big Horn County in Wyoming

This is a list of the National Register of Historic Places listings in Big Horn County, Wyoming.

This is intended to be a complete list of the properties and districts on the National Register of Historic Places in Big Horn County, Wyoming, United States. The locations of National Register properties and districts for which the latitude and longitude coordinates are included below, may be seen in a map.

There are 23 properties and districts listed on the National Register in the county, 1 of which is a National Historic Landmark.

This National Park Service list is complete through NPS recent listings posted May 1, 2026.

Contents: Counties in Wyoming
Albany - Big Horn - Campbell - Carbon - Converse - Crook - Fremont - Goshen - Hot Springs - Johnson - Laramie - Lincoln - Natrona - Niobrara - Park - Platte - Sheridan - Sublette - Sweetwater - Teton - Uinta - Washakie - Weston

== Current listings ==
	Name on the Register	Image	Date listed	Location	City or town	Description
1	American Legion Hall, Post 32	American Legion Hall, Post 32	June 27, 2014 (#14000386)	130 N. 5th St. 44°29′26″N 108°03′15″W	Greybull	Meeting hall significant as a key gathering place in Greybull 1935–1959 for a panoply of social clubs and organizations, as well as civic use as a polling place and overflow classroom for the public schools.
2	Bad Pass Trail	Bad Pass Trail	October 29, 1975 (#75000215)	East of Lovell along the Bighorn River; 44°56′00″N 108°15′00″W	Bighorn Canyon National Recreation Area	Remnants of a cairn-marked trail between the Bighorn Basin and the northern plains, established by Native Americans in antiquity and used by their descendents and mountain men into the mid-1830s. Extends into Carbon County, Montana.
3	Basin Republican-Rustler Printing Building	Basin Republican-Rustler Printing Building	July 19, 1976 (#76001948)	409 W. C St. 44°22′51″N 108°02′23″W	Basin	Newspaper office with vintage equipment, active 1924–1974 printing the continuation of the Bighorn Basin's first newspaper, established in 1889 by Joseph Newton DeBarthe—a key record of local history.
4	Bear Creek Ranch Medicine Wheel		May 4, 1987 (#87000661)	Address restricted	Greybull vicinity	
5	Big Horn Academy Historic District	Big Horn Academy Historic District	March 26, 1992 (#92000285)	25 and 35 E. 1st S. 44°52′57″N 108°28′06″W	Cowley	The Bighorn Basin's first high school and a long-serving community venue, with a 1916 classroom building initially constructed as a Mormon parochial boarding school, and a 1936 gymnasium funded by the Works Progress Administration.
6	Black Mountain Archeological District		July 2, 1987 (#86003459)	Summit and southeastern slopes of Black Mountain; 44°31′24″N 107°39′42″W	Shell	Two chert quarries, six rock shelters, and three campsites spanning the early Paleo-Indian to late Prehistoric periods.
7	Bridger Immigrant Road-Dry Creek Crossing		January 17, 1975 (#75001900)	26 miles east of Cody on U.S. Route 14; 44°27′40″N 108°31′48″W	Cody vicinity	Still-visible fragment of a wagon route blazed by Jim Bridger in 1864 for gold rush miners to reach Virginia City, Montana; an alternative to the more direct but riskier Bozeman Trail.
8	Carey Block	Carey Block	December 18, 2009 (#09001110)	602 Greybull Ave. 44°29′21″N 108°03′20″W	Greybull	Prominent and architecturally sophisticated 1916 commercial building with a 1933 car dealership and repair shop addition, encapsulating Greybull's oil boom prosperity and later diversification through auto tourism.
9	EJE Bridge over Shell Creek	EJE Bridge over Shell Creek	February 22, 1985 (#85000415)	County Road CN9-57; 44°32′05″N 107°48′08″W	Shell	Wyoming's longest Warren pony truss bridge, built 1920, exemplifying an early Warren variation. Removed and replaced in 2005.
10	EJP County Line Bridge	EJP County Line Bridge	February 22, 1985 (#85000412)	Road CN9-60; 44°09′59″N 107°41′02″W	Hyattville	1917 camelback pony truss bridge, Wyoming's longest, and its only road bridge jointly funded by two counties, on the mistaken belief that it crossed a county boundary.
11	EJZ Bridge over Shoshone River	EJZ Bridge over Shoshone River	February 22, 1985 (#85000413)	County Road CN9-111; 44°50′18″N 108°26′05″W	Lovell	Distinctive four-span example (built 1925–26) of the Warren pony truss bridges commissioned by the Wyoming Highway Department in the 1920s and 1930s.
12	Hanson Site		December 15, 1978 (#78002817)	Address restricted	Shell vicinity	Paleo-Indian camping ground on either side of an arroyo, with extensive evidence of stone tool manufacturing, fires, animal bone fragments, and Folsom tradition lodges.
13	Hyart Theater	Hyart Theater	January 8, 2009 (#08001304)	251 E. Main St. 44°50′16″N 108°23′17″W	Lovell	One of Wyoming's few intact early-1950s movie theaters, built with state-of-the-art features in 1950.
14	Lower Shell School House	Lower Shell School House	February 7, 1985 (#85000247)	U.S. Route 14; 44°31′16″N 107°56′06″W	Greybull vicinity	1903 one-room school, one of Wyoming's few intact examples of the once-essential facilities built to provide education and community meeting space in frontier communities.
15	M L Ranch	M L Ranch	July 15, 1992 (#92000836)	Off Alternate U.S. Route 14 near the eastern shore of Bighorn Lake; 44°49′46″N 108°09′34″W	Bighorn Canyon National Recreation Area	Four surviving buildings of an 1883 ranch, associated with Henry Clay Lovell (1838–1903) and the development of open range cattle ranching in the Bighorn Basin in 1880s and 1890s. Now an interpretive site.
16	Medicine Lodge Creek Site	Medicine Lodge Creek Site	July 5, 1973 (#73001926)	4800 County Road 52; 44°17′57″N 107°32′28″W	Hyattville vicinity	Sheltered wintering site with rock art and 12 habitation layers spanning from 8300 years ago to the early contact period. Preserved and interpreted as Medicine Lodge State Archeological Site.
17	Medicine Wheel-Medicine Mountain	Medicine Wheel-Medicine Mountain	April 16, 1969 (#69000184)	Near the summit of Medicine Mountain; 44°49′34″N 107°55′18″W	Kane vicinity	Significant and well-preserved Native American sacred complex in use for at least 7000 years, comprising a 75-foot-diameter (23 m) medicine wheel, archaeological sites, and traditional use areas.
18	Paint Rock Canyon Archeological Landscape District		July 12, 1990 (#80004881)	Address restricted	Hyattville vicinity	Largely undeveloped canyonland with rock shelters and campsites spanning the early Paleo-Indian to late Prehistoric periods.
19	Rairden Bridge	Rairden Bridge	February 22, 1985 (#85000414)	Adjacent to Rairden Ln. over the Bighorn River; 44°11′39″N 107°54′55″W	Manderson vicinity	The longest single-span truss bridge ever built by a Wyoming county, and one of the state's only two remaining pin-connected Pennsylvania trusses. Erected in 1916 and abandoned in place in 1979.
20	Shell Community Hall	Shell Community Hall	January 3, 2022 (#100007266)	201 Smith Ave. 44°32′08″N 107°46′42″W	Shell	Municipal event venue built 1933–34 with Civil Works Administration funding, exemplifying the enduring benefit of New Deal programs for small Wyoming communities.
21	Southsider Shelter		August 1, 2012 (#12000470)	Address restricted	Ten Sleep vicinity	Rock shelter with five well-stratified occupation layers spanning the early Paleo-Indian to late Prehistoric periods, illuminating the area's chronology of projectile points and early subsistence strategies.
22	US Post Office-Basin Main	US Post Office-Basin Main	May 19, 1987 (#87000779)	402 W. C St. 44°22′53″N 108°02′22″W	Basin	Exemplary small Neoclassical post office, built in 1919 to complete Basin's civic square during the city's peak period of growth.
23	US Post Office-Greybull Main	US Post Office-Greybull Main	May 22, 1987 (#87000780)	401 Greybull Ave. 44°29′19″N 108°03′10″W	Greybull	1939 post office, one of five in Wyoming with Section of Painting and Sculpture artwork, symbolizing the extensive New Deal public works and federal presence benefiting small communities.

== See also ==
- List of National Historic Landmarks in Wyoming
- National Register of Historic Places listings in Wyoming
