= Shell Community Hall =

- U.S. National Register of Historic Places
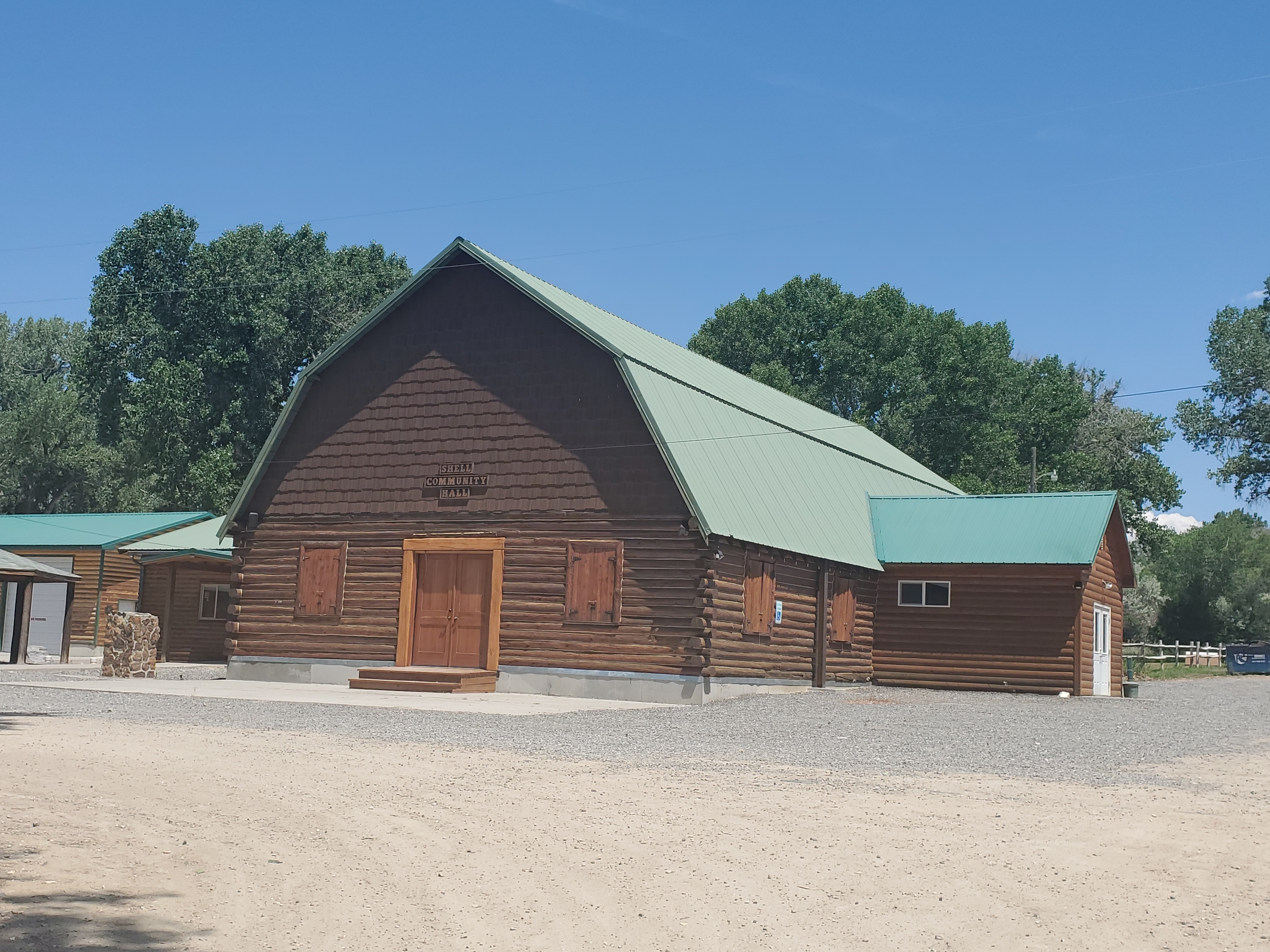

- Location within Wyoming Location within the United States
- Location: 201 Smith Ave, Shell, Wyoming
- Coordinates: 44.535573°N 107.778410°W
- Built: 1933
- NRHP reference No.: 100007266
- Added to NRHP: January 3, 2022

Shell Community Hall was built by with Civil Works Administration funding, in Shell, Wyoming, Big Horn County, Wyoming. The municipal event venue built 1933 during the Great Depression, The Shell Community Hall was built for community social events: business meetings, and school programs, wedding and more. Two additions have been made to Shell Community Hall. The Shell Community Hall is till in use.

== See also ==
- Southsider Shelter
- US Post Office-Basin Main
