= Pocahontas Times =

- Type: Weekly newspaper
- Format: Broadsheet
- Owner(s): The Pocahontas Times, Inc.
- Founded: 1882
- Headquarters: 206 Eighth Street, Marlinton, Pocahontas County, WV 24954
- Circulation: 4,629 (as of 2016)
- ISSN: 0738-8373
- OCLC number: 9694614
- Website: pocahontastimes.com

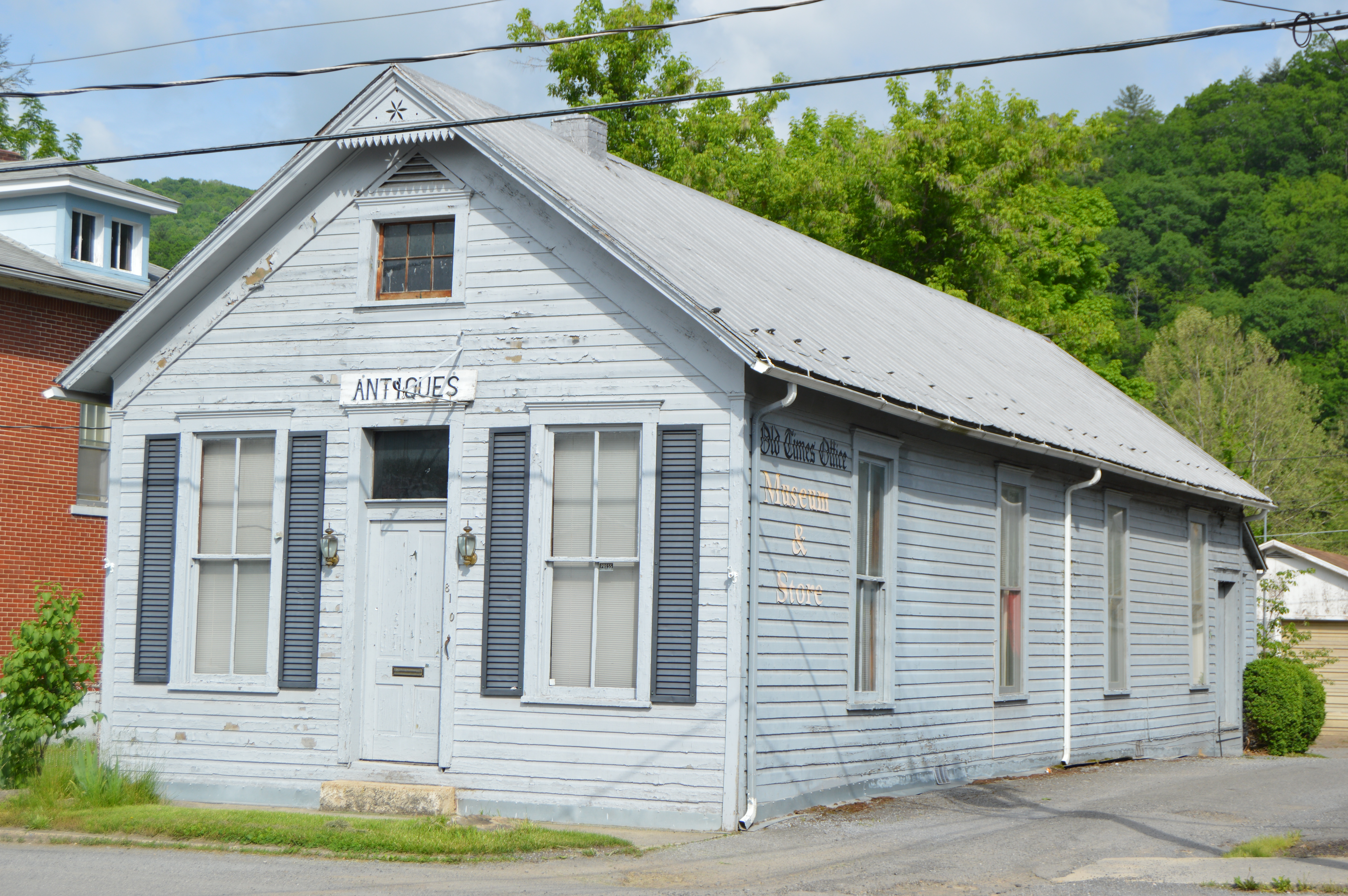
Former offices in Marlinton

The Pocahontas Times is a weekly newspaper out of Marlinton, West Virginia. It is owned by The Pocahontas Times Inc., and has a circulation of 4,629.

== History ==
Founded in 1882 in Huntersville by Reverend William T. Price, the paper was initially meant to keep his sons busy and provide extra income to pay for their college education. The paper moved to Marlinton in 1892.

The paper is most famous for the writings of its long-time editor and publisher Cal Price. Price, who bought out his brother's share of the paper in 1906, ran the paper until his death in 1957. Politically engaged, his editorials often fell towards the conservative side of the spectrum: he was, for example, an ardent supporter of Governor Ephraim Morgan's anti-Union America First Day. But in his 51 years as editor his reputation, both regionally and nationally, was built on his widely syndicated column "Field Notes" which focused on stories of local wildlife, and advanced the cause of conservation. Due to both his literary and political efforts, West Virginia named a state forest after him while he was still living, a fact of which Price said he was "sinfully proud."

After Price's death in 1957, the paper was run by his daughter Jane Price Sharp for many years. Elected president of the West Virginia Press Association, she became known nationally for her continued use of handset type, which the paper used into the 1980s. Her father, she said, had bought a linotype machine in 1901 but hadn't taken to it, and had sent it back; they had continued with hand set type since that time, although by the late 1970s they had to produce everything but the front page in offset type as that was how ads were supplied.

In an ironic turn of events, the paper—the last to use handset type—became the earliest in West Virginia to adopt desktop publishing, after a 1985 flood destroyed their printing plant.

Jane Sharp died in 2017, at the age of 95.

The paper is seen as an authoritative source of coverage for the county, and was sourced for national AP story as recently as 2017.

== See also ==
- Pocahontas Times Print Shop

== Resources ==
- List of newspapers in West Virginia
