= Lower Shell School House =

- U.S. National Register of Historic Places
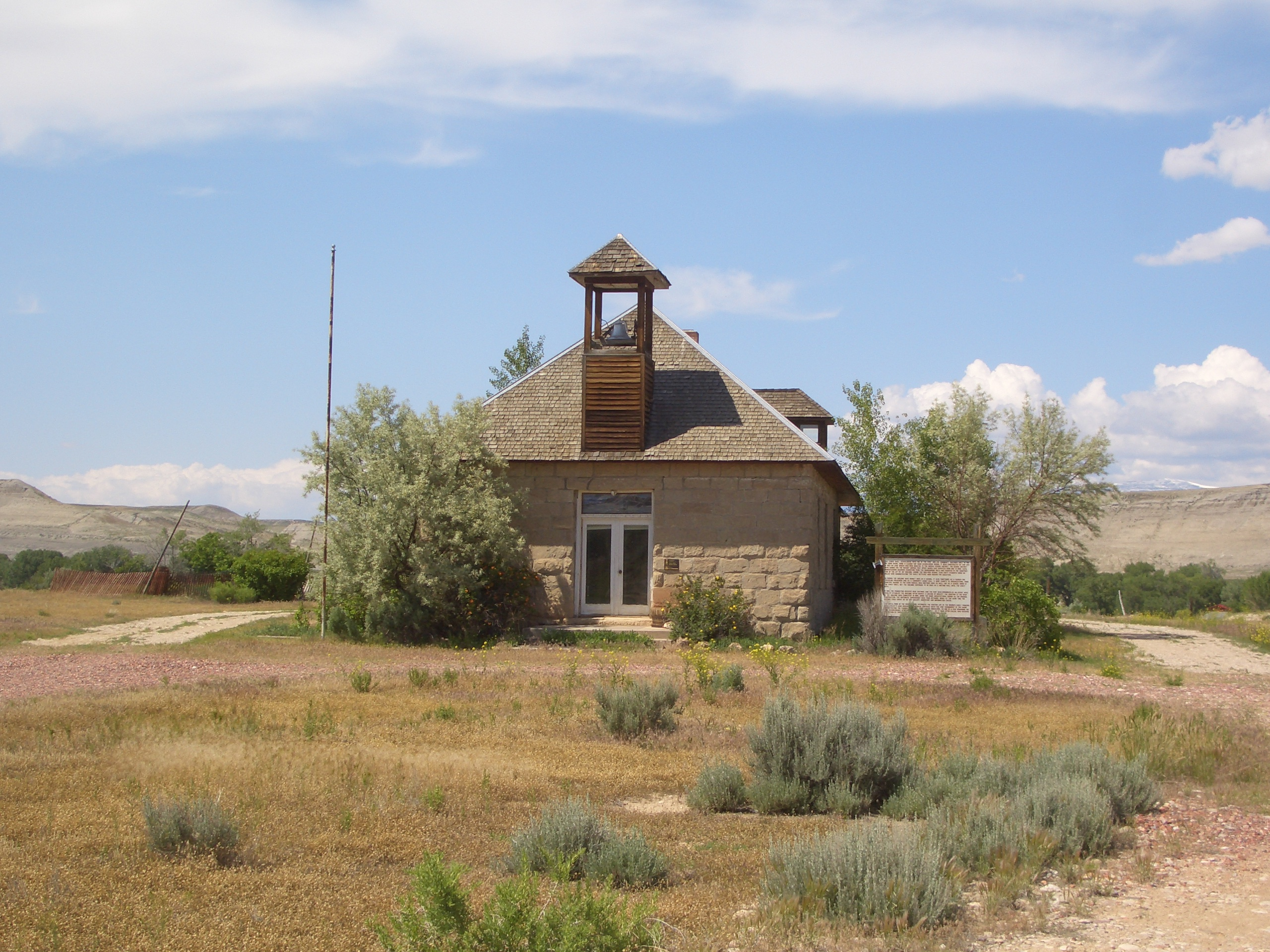

- Location within Wyoming Location within the United States
- Nearest city: Greybull, Wyoming
- Coordinates: 44°31′15″N 107°56′3″W
- Built: 1903
- NRHP reference No.: 85000247
- Added to NRHP: February 7, 1985

The Lower Shell School House is located in an isolated portion of Big Horn County, Wyoming on a bluff near Shell Creek. The one-room schoolhouse was built in 1903, and was one of the first buildings in the area that did not use log construction. The school functioned as a church and Sunday school, and as a community meeting place. It was used as a school until the 1950s, and as a community meeting house until the 1970s.

The school is set in a wild landscape of greasewood overlooking the Shell Creek Valley, six miles east of Greybull and eight miles west of Shell on US 14. The one story building measures approximately 24 feet (7.3 m) by 46 feet (14 m). The facade is executed in coursed ashlar sandstone, while the secondary elevations are in rock-faced sandstone in random coursing. The building is entered through double doors with a fixed transom above, and a "1903" datestone above the rock-faced stone lintel. The hipped roof features a wood framed bell tower. The interior was one room with wainscoting and a wood floor. The ceiling height is 11.67 feet (3.56 m).

The school house has been renovated as a single-family home, with commercial space in the schoolroom. A three-level wood-framed addition has been added to the rear, leaving the main school room intact.

The Lower Shell School House was listed on the National Register of Historic Places in 1985.
