= Shell Falls =

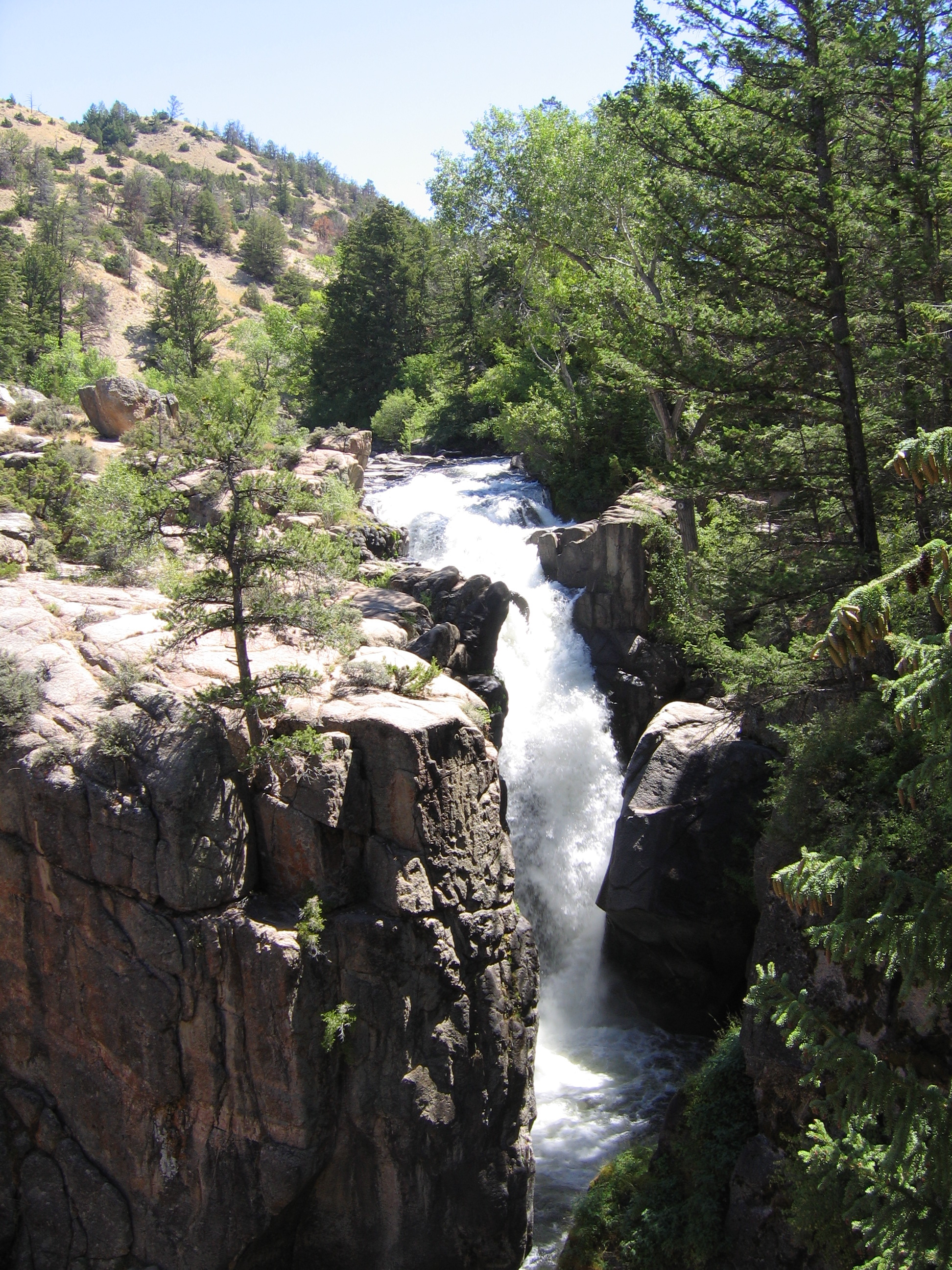
- Shell Falls
- Interactive map of Shell Falls
- Location: Big Horn Mountains, Big Horn County, Wyoming, U.S.
- Coordinates: 44°35′11″N 107°36′48″W
- Total height: 120 ft (37 m)
- Number of drops: 1
- Watercourse: Shell Creek

Shell Falls is a waterfall in the Bighorn National Forest on Shell Creek, about halfway down Shell Canyon, and a few miles upstream from the town of Shell in northeast Wyoming. The falls are 120 feet (37 meters) in height and tumble over basement rock of granite.

From the rest area and interpretive center, one can see outcrops of the Cambrian flathead sandstone, about 550 million years old, resting on 2.9 billion year old Precambrian rocks—some of the oldest rocks on earth. Visitors can also see "Copman's Tomb", a massive limestone promontory to the north.

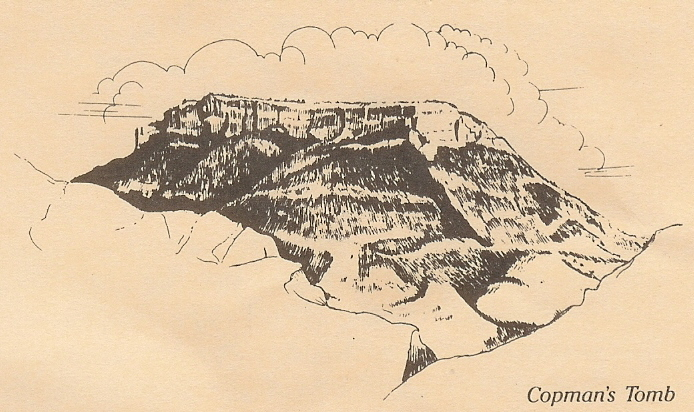
Copman's Tomb by Karyne Dickson.

Shell Falls Interpretive Center.

== See also ==
- Shell Creek
