= Owl Creek Bridge =

Owl Creek Bridge may refer to:

- "An Occurrence at Owl Creek Bridge", a short story by Ambrose Bierce
  - "An Occurrence at Owl Creek Bridge" season 5 episode 13 of Alfred Hitchcock Presents
  - An Occurrence at Owl Creek Bridge (film), a French film adaptation of Bierce's short story, originally titled La Rivière du Hibou (and eventually aired as an episode of The Twilight Zone)
- EFP Bridge over Owl Creek
