= Huntersville, West Virginia =

Huntersville
- Census-designated place (CDP)
- Location within the state of West Virginia
- Coordinates: 38°11′19″N 80°0′58″W
- Country: United States
- State: West Virginia
- County: Pocahontas

Area
  - Total: 1.131 sq mi (2.93 km^{2})
  - Land: 1.131 sq mi (2.93 km^{2})
  - Water: 0 sq mi (0 km^{2})

Population (2020)
  - Total: 68
  - Density: 60/sq mi (23/km^{2})
- Time zone: UTC-5 (Eastern (EST))
  - Summer (DST): UTC-4 (EDT)

Huntersville is a census-designated place (CDP) located in Pocahontas County, West Virginia, United States in the Alleghany Mountains. As of the 2020 census, its population was 68 (down from 73 at the 2010 census). It is located six miles east of Marlinton and four miles west of Minnehaha Springs. Huntersville received its name because it was a rendezvous for trappers and hunters who came to trade pelts for supplies. It served as the county seat of Pocahontas County until 1891 when the county's residents voted to move the seat to Marlinton. A local newspaper called The Pocahontas Times is distributed in the area.

Huntersville has many sporting opportunities. Because of its proximity to Knapps Creek flowing nearby, fishermen can catch trout, bass, sun perch, and other fish. Native brook trout streams are also tucked away in quiet places close to the town. Hunting is a big tradition that still lives on in this community because of the vast stretches of Monongahela National Forest that borders the town.

The Huntersville Presbyterian Church was listed on the National Register of Historic Places in 1978.
