= Monarch Engineering Co. =

American engineering firm

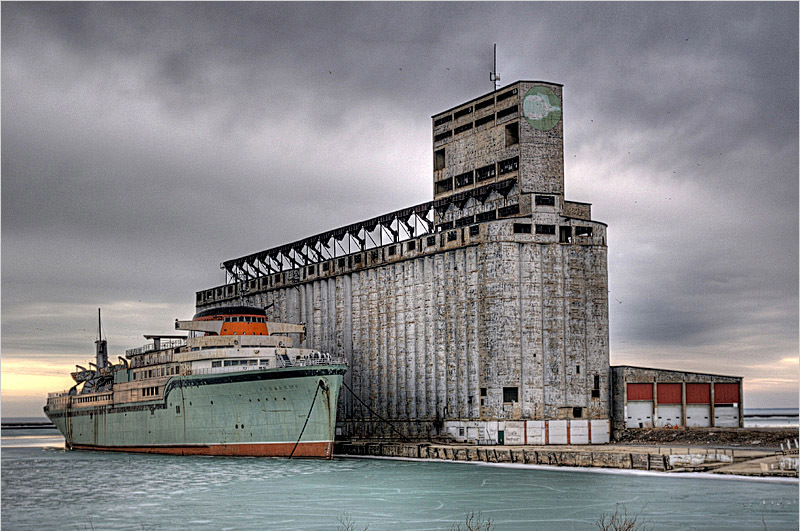
Cargill Pool Elevator, Buffalo, New York

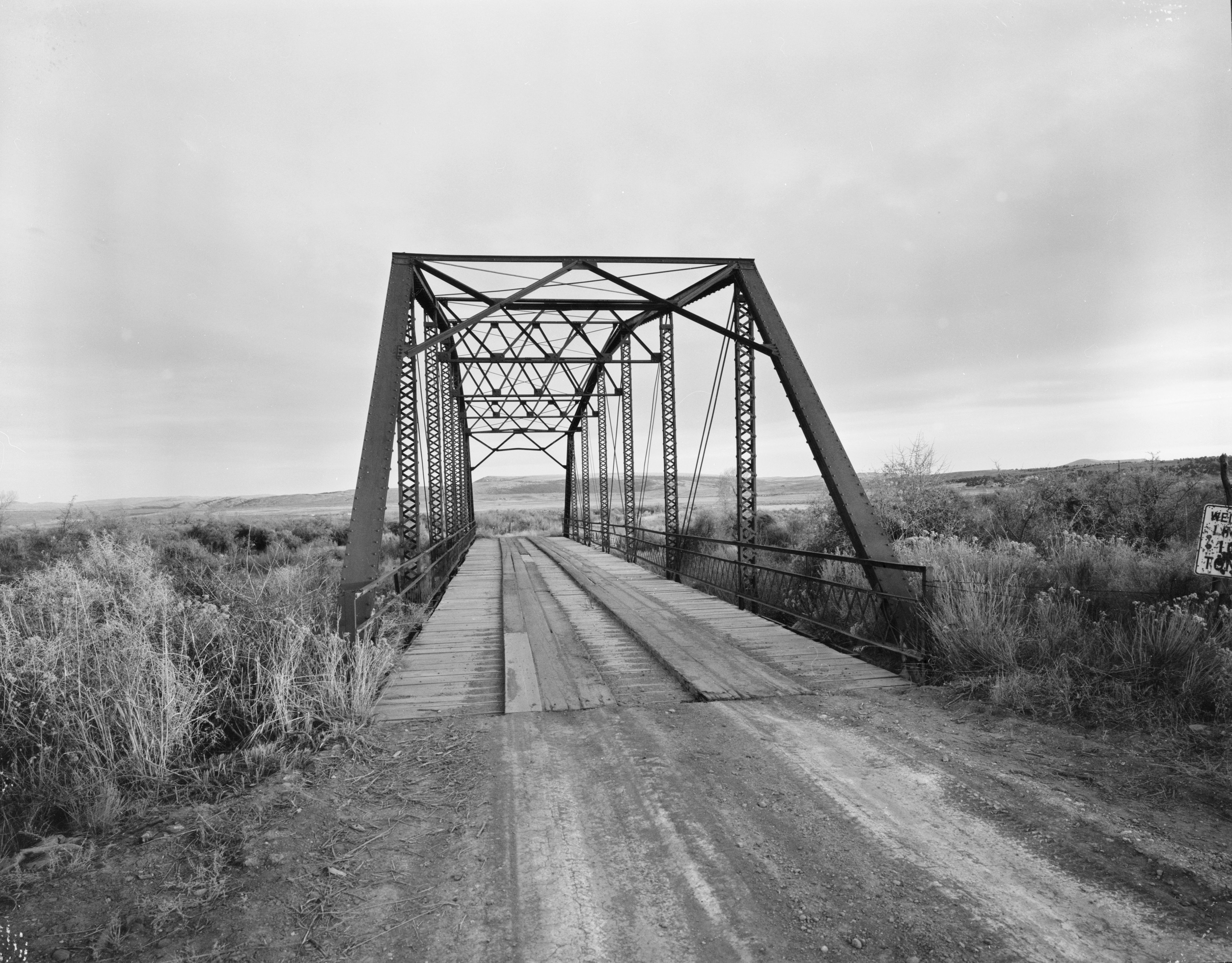
EFP Bridge over Owl Creek, Thermopolis, Wyoming

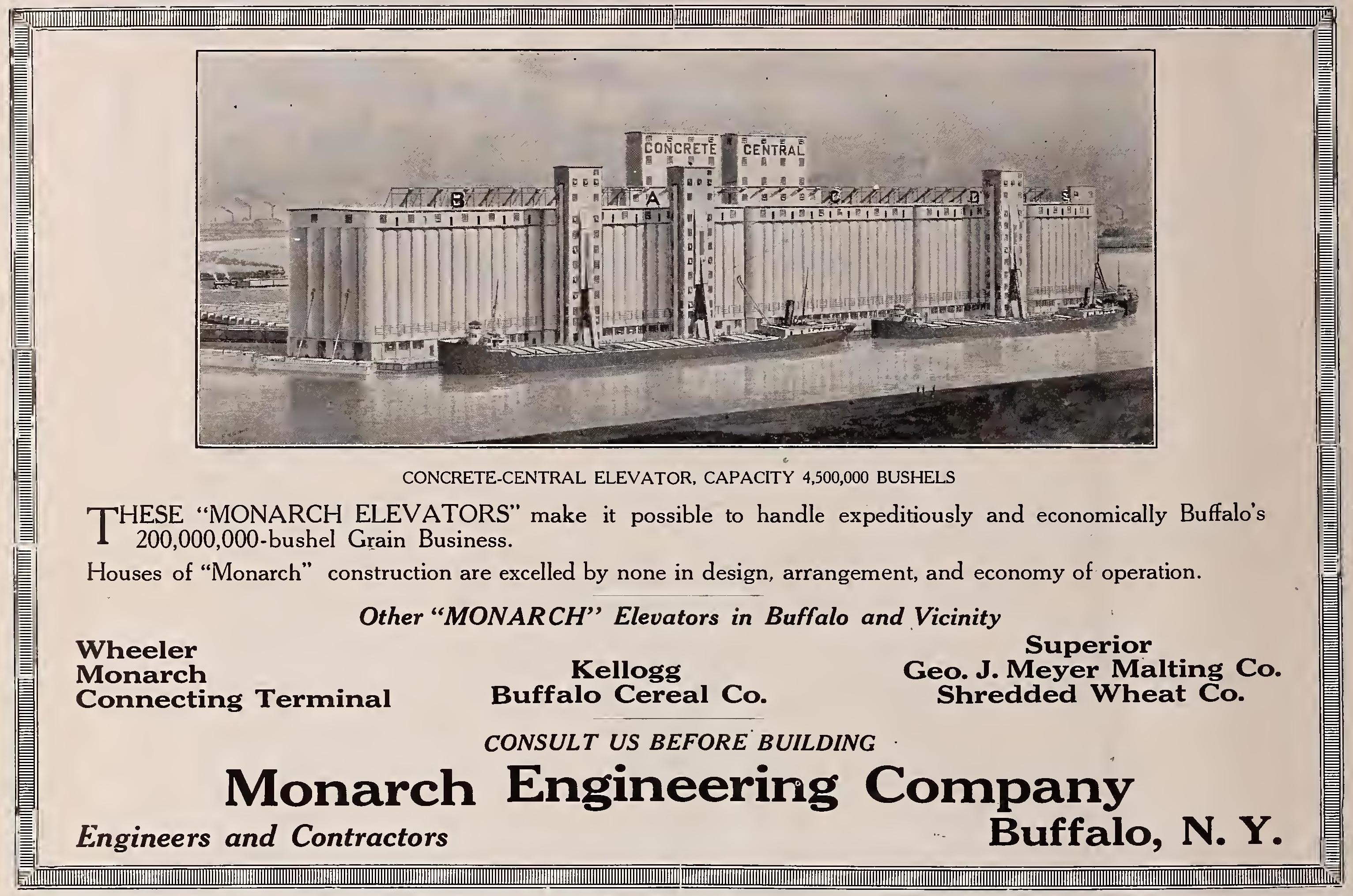
Concrete-Central Elevator of Buffalo, New York with a 4,500,000 bushel capacity built by Monarch Engineering Company - from the before January 1919

Monarch Engineering Co. was an American firm of Denver, Colorado, active in engineering and construction services. John A. Crook and his brother, Guy A. Crook of Falls City, were founders of the Monarch Engineering company which had its origin and main offices at Falls City, with offices in Kansas City, and Denver. Under the management of these men the Monarch Engineering company had risen to become an important and prosperous concern and a vast amount of bridge construction, city paving, irrigation-dam building, and public building work has been done under their supervision. Within ten years after the firm had been in operation, or since 1908, its activities constantly increased and in 1917 they purchased the Denver Steel and Iron Works in order to facilitate the material supply part of the construction work in which they were engaged.

Mr. Crook was born in Falls City, April 9, 1879, a son of the late W. H. Crook, hardware merchant. He received his education in the public and high schools of Falls City and studied in the state university. He pursued an engineering course with the International Correspondence school of Scranton, Pa., and was first employed with the Canton Bridge Company in Omaha as structural and construction engineer for two years, 1898 to 1900. He returned to Falls City in 1900 and entered the employ of the John Gilligan Bridge company and remained with this concern until 1908. He then established the Monarch Engineering Company, being joined by his brother, Guy A. Crook, in 1910.

In October 1916 the growth of the concern required that he locate in Denver where he had charge of the Denver Steel and Iron Works and looked after the company's western operations.

A number of its works are listed on the U.S. National Register of Historic Places.

Works include:

- Cargill Pool Elevator, 1489 Fuhrmann Boulevard, Buffalo, NY
- Cargill Superior elevator, also known as Superior elevator or Cargill "S", 874 Ohio Street, Buffalo, New York
- Concrete-Central Elevator, 175 Buffalo River, Buffalo, New York (Monarch Engineering Co.), NRHP-listed
- EAU Arvada Bridge, Cty. Rd. CN3-38, Arvada, Wyoming (Monarch Engineering Co.), NRHP-listed
- EFP Bridge over Owl Creek, Cty. Rd. CN15-28, Thermopolis, Wyoming (Monarch Engineering Co.), NRHP-listed
- EJP County Line Bridge, Rd. CN9-60, Hyattville, Wyoming (Monarch Engineering Co.), NRHP-listed
- Little Hell Canyon Bridge, abandoned US 89 over Little Hell Canyon, Drake, Arizona (Monarch Engineering Co.), NRHP-listed
- Prairie Dog Creek Bridge, Twp. Rd. over Prairie Dog Cr., 8.5 mi. S and 1 mi. W of Orleans, Orleans, Nebraska (Monarch Engineering Co.), NRHP-listed
- Rairden Bridge, S of Big Horn Cty. Rd. CN9-30, Manderson, Wyoming (Monarch Engineering Co.), NRHP-listed
- Rio Grande Bridge at San Juan Pueblo, NM 74 over Rio Grande, Alcalde, New Mexico (Monarch Engineering Company), NRHP-listed
- Sanders Bridge, Indian Rt. 9402 over the Puerco River, Sanders, Arizona (Monarch Engineering Co.), NRHP-listed
- Wheeler Elevator, 385 Ganson Street, Buffalo, New York
