= Black Mountain Archeological District =

- U.S. National Register of Historic Places
- U.S. Historic district
- Nearest city: Shell, Wyoming
- Area: 530 acres (210 ha)
- NRHP reference No.: 86003459
- Added to NRHP: July 2, 1987

The Black Mountain Archeological District is a region of the Bighorn Basin near Shell, Wyoming that contains archeological sites associated with chert deposits used in making tools and weapons. It covers 530 acres (210 ha).

The area was occupied from about 11,500 years ago in the Paleoindian Period to the Late Prehistoric Period of 1500 to 400 years ago. The sites have not yielded more recent artifacts.

The area contains six rock shelters, two campsites at canyon bottoms and one interfluve campsite, as well as the Black Mountain and East Spring Creek chert quarries. The local chert comes from the Phosphoria Formation, and is red in color.

The district was placed on the National Register of Historic Places on July 2, 1987.
