= Cargill Pool Elevator =

Silo in New York, United States

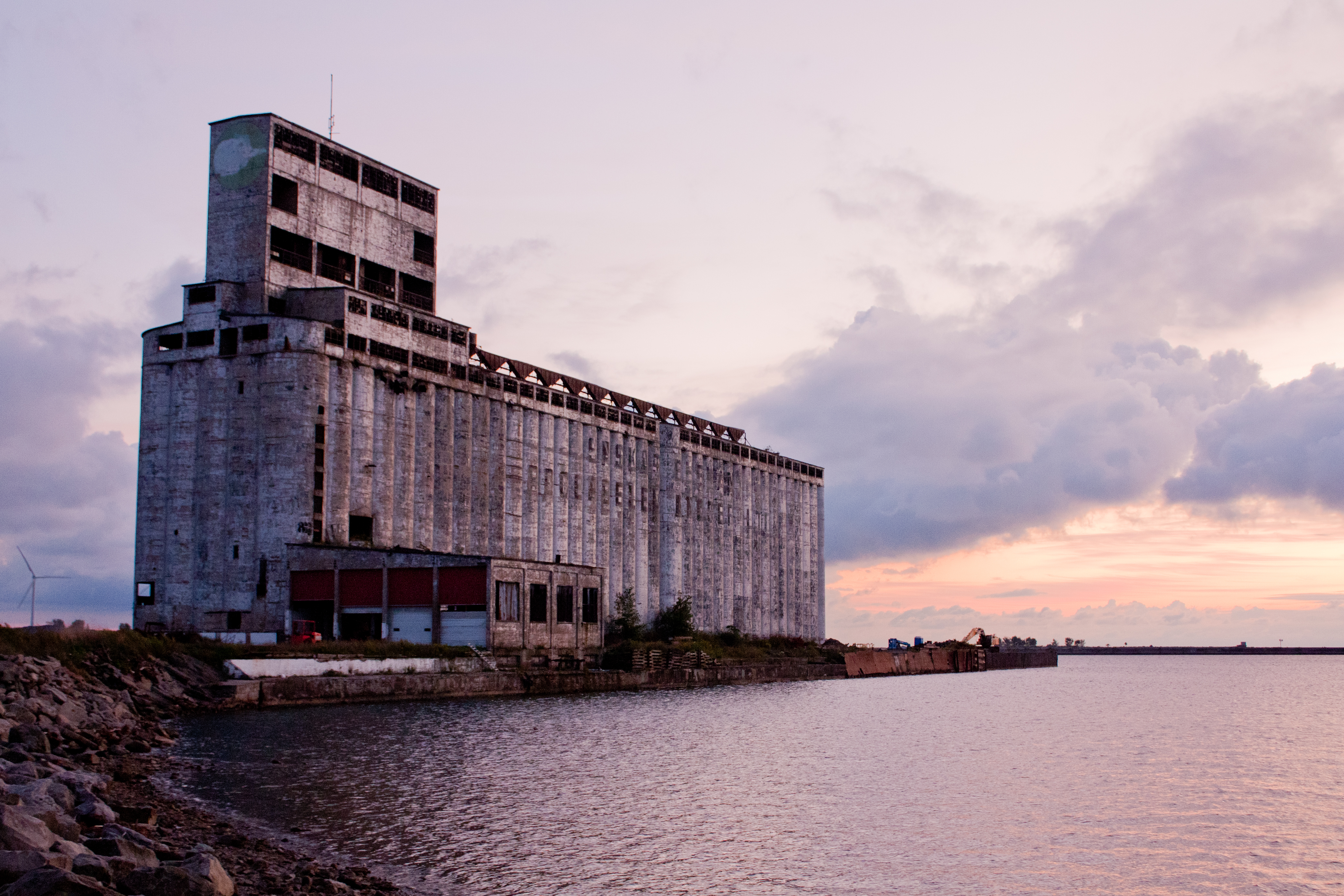
- Cargill Pool Grain Elevator, in Buffalo, NY
- Interactive map of the Cargill Pool Elevator area
- Former names: Saskatchewan Cooperative Elevator

General information
- Status: Completed
- Type: Silo
- Location: 1489 Fuhrmann Boulevard, Buffalo, NY, United States
- Coordinates: 42.839583°N 78.860850°W
- Construction started: May 5, 1925
- Opening: December, 1925

Height
- Roof: 173 feet (52.7 m)

Design and construction
- Architect: C. D. Howe (as Chief Engineer)
- Structural engineer: Monarch Engineering Co.
- Main contractor: Monarch Engineering Co.

The Cargill Pool Elevator is a grain storage facility in Buffalo harbor built in the 1920s and previously named the Saskatchewan Cooperative Elevator. The elevator is the only grain elevator in Buffalo that is located directly adjacent to Lake Erie.

== History ==
Completed in 1925, the grain elevator was constructed by a co-operative of Canadian wheat farmers known as the Saskatchewan Co-operative Elevator Company. The cooperative owned the elevator until 1945 but turned over daily operations to Superior Grain Corporation, an offshoot of the Superior Elevator. It was purchased in 1945 by investors who called themselves the "Pool Elevator Company." Pillsbury purchased the elevator facility in January 1952 for $1 million. The Cargill company later purchased the facility in 1964 as a holding facility for grain. Cargill eventually left Buffalo, abandoning the building. Cargill allowed the Pool to stand idle and to become delinquent in property tax payments. Upon default, the city of Buffalo placed the Pool on the auction block.

The Pool Elevator, like all other grain elevators in Buffalo, was deeply affected by the 1959 opening of the St. Lawrence Seaway. Because the Buffalo elevators could be by-passed outright via the Seaway, fewer customers each year saw value in unloading grain to an elevator and reloading to rail cars bound for eastern ports.

== Storage ==
The Pool Elevator transfer facility offered a total holding capacity of 2.1 million US bushels (74,000 m^{3}) in 135 bins. The main house features a capacity of 1.11 million US bushels (39,000 m^{3}) of grain stored in 33 main cylindrical bins. Two of which are subdivided vertically to provide four quarter bins, twenty interspace bins, and twenty-four outerspace bins. The elevator was built in stages, as evidenced by the different extensions to the bins that make up the current structure. The two lakeside marine legs could siphon off 250,000 US bushels (8,800 m^{3}) every eight hours. Numerous boxcars were subsequently loaded on a track that could accommodate fifty-two cars at a time. The Pool could load 100 cars per day, each with a 200,000-US-bushel (7,000 m^{3}) capacity. Virtually all receipts and shipments were in bulk, and the elevator handled a wide variety of wheat, oats, barley, and other grains.

== Present day ==
The building is presently owned by South End Marina, and used for general storage. The original marine leg boat unloading towers and railroad tracks have been removed as the building is no longer used for grain storage. The south end marina operated on the property from the mid-1980s until 2011 when it closed after a fire that burned down the boat mechanic shop. The long finger pier that forms the dock that the elevator sits on is used as a base of operations for local dredging projects and marine equipment is often tied up there. This dock was also the last port of call for the vessels Aquarama/Marine Star and Lansdowne before both ships were towed away for scrap.

The Cargill Pool Elevator, a.k.a. the Old Lakefront Grain Elevator, a.k.a. the Saskatchewan Cooperative Elevator (built by Canadian Farmers Cooperative), along with its 12.2-acre (4.9 ha) property was again put up for auction. The auction date was scheduled for June 5, 2013. A yet unnamed bidder successfully purchased the elevator on the day of the auction for a sum of $475,000.00, confirmed by Cash Realty & Auction.

== Gallery ==
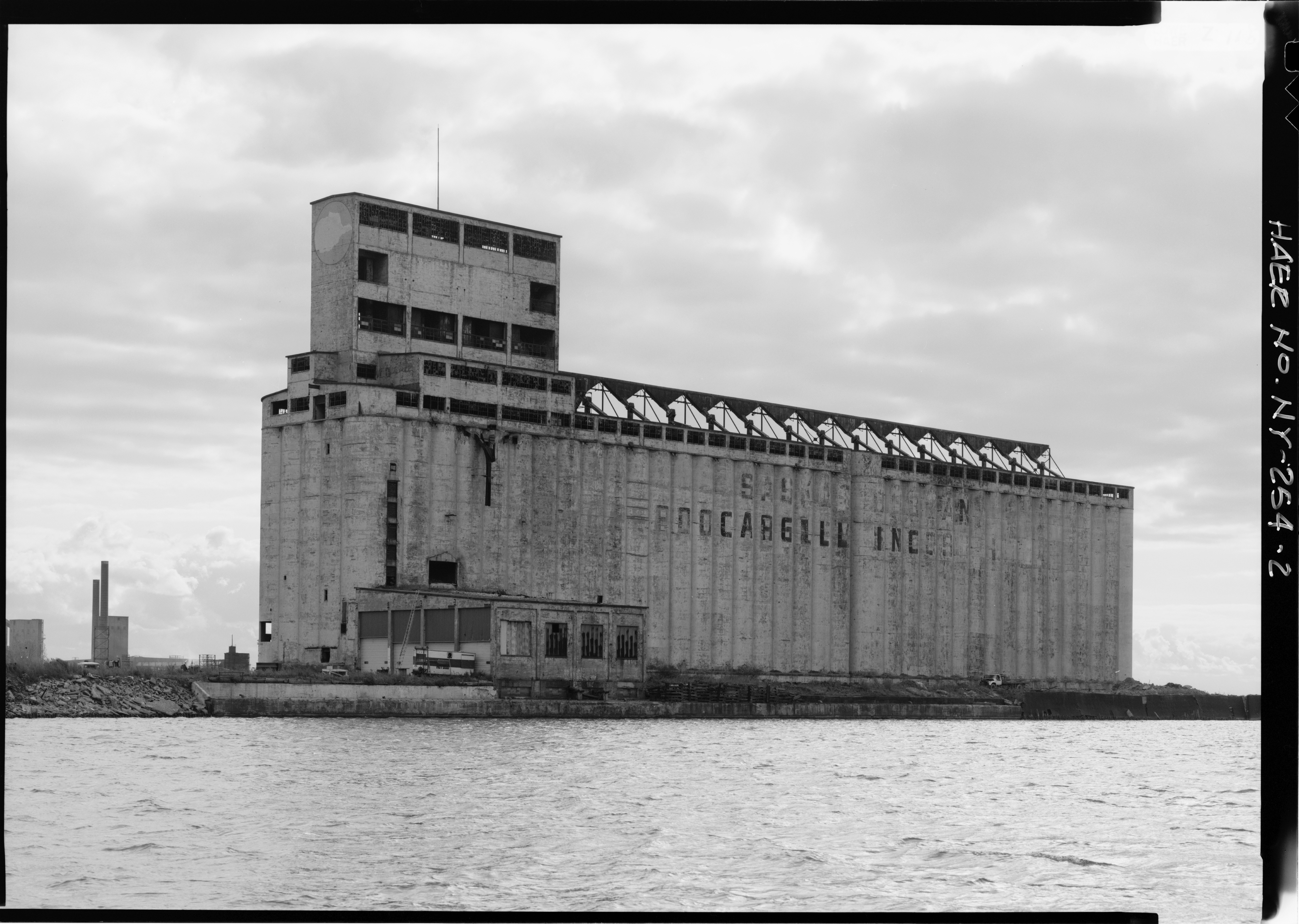
HAER photo

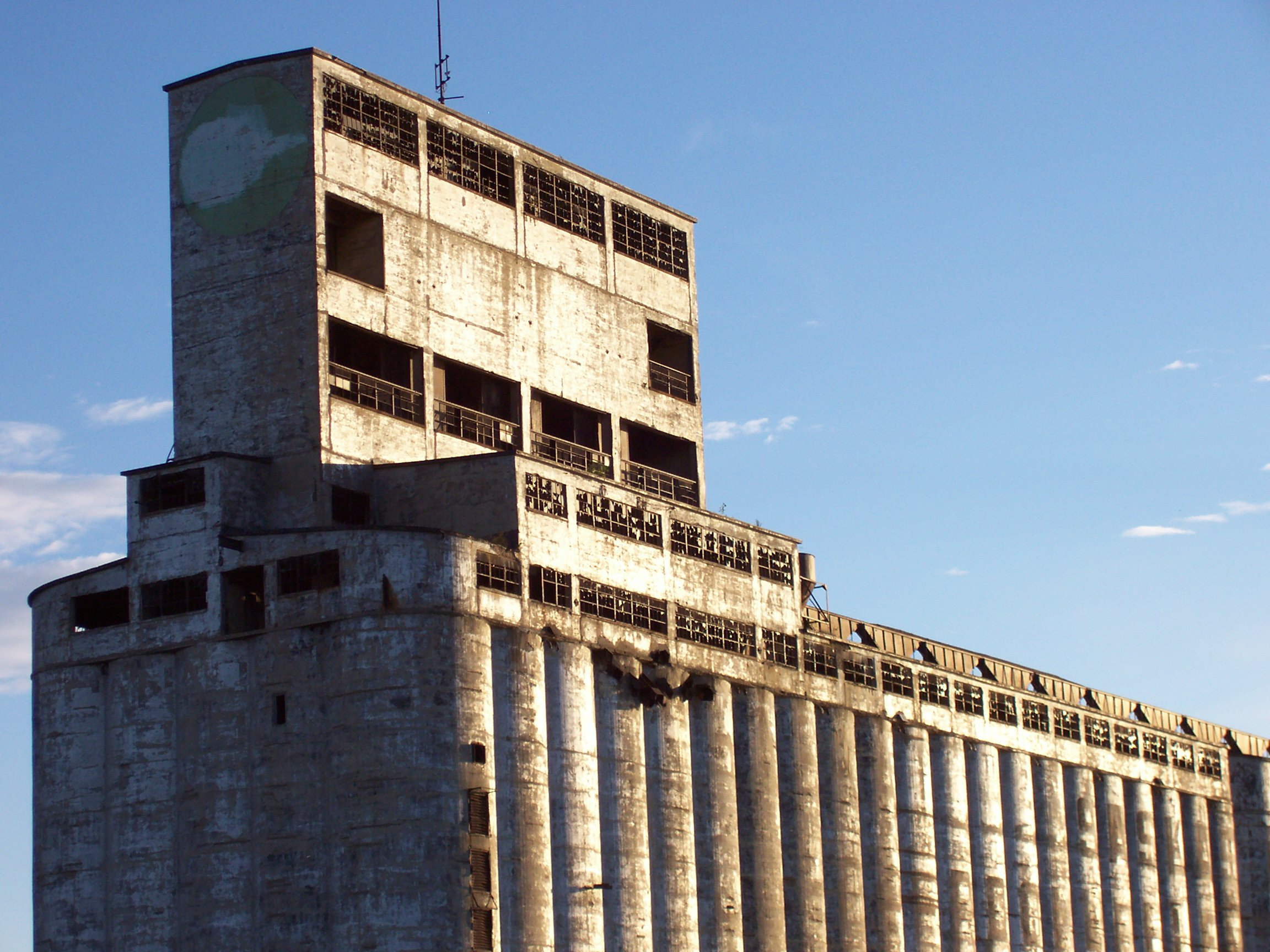
Close-up view

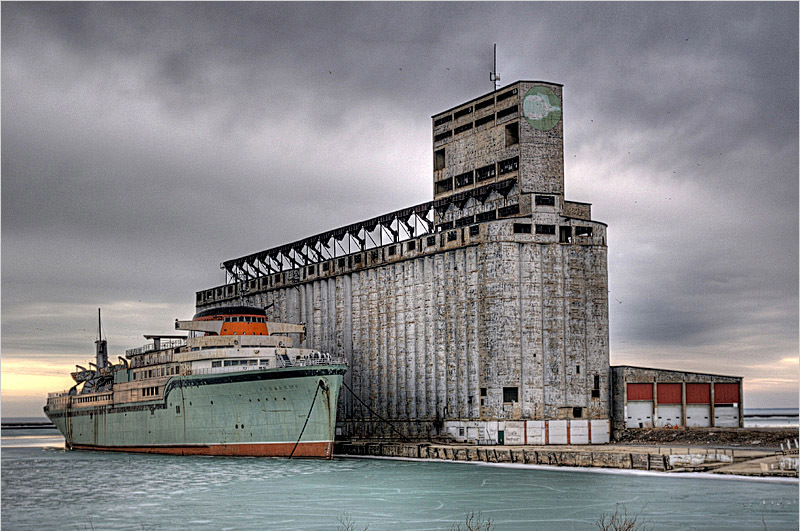
SS Aquarama docked at the elevator

== See also ==
- Canada Malting Silos
- Maple Leaf Mills Silos
- Victory Soya Mills Silos
