= Basin Republican-Rustler Printing Building =

- U.S. National Register of Historic Places
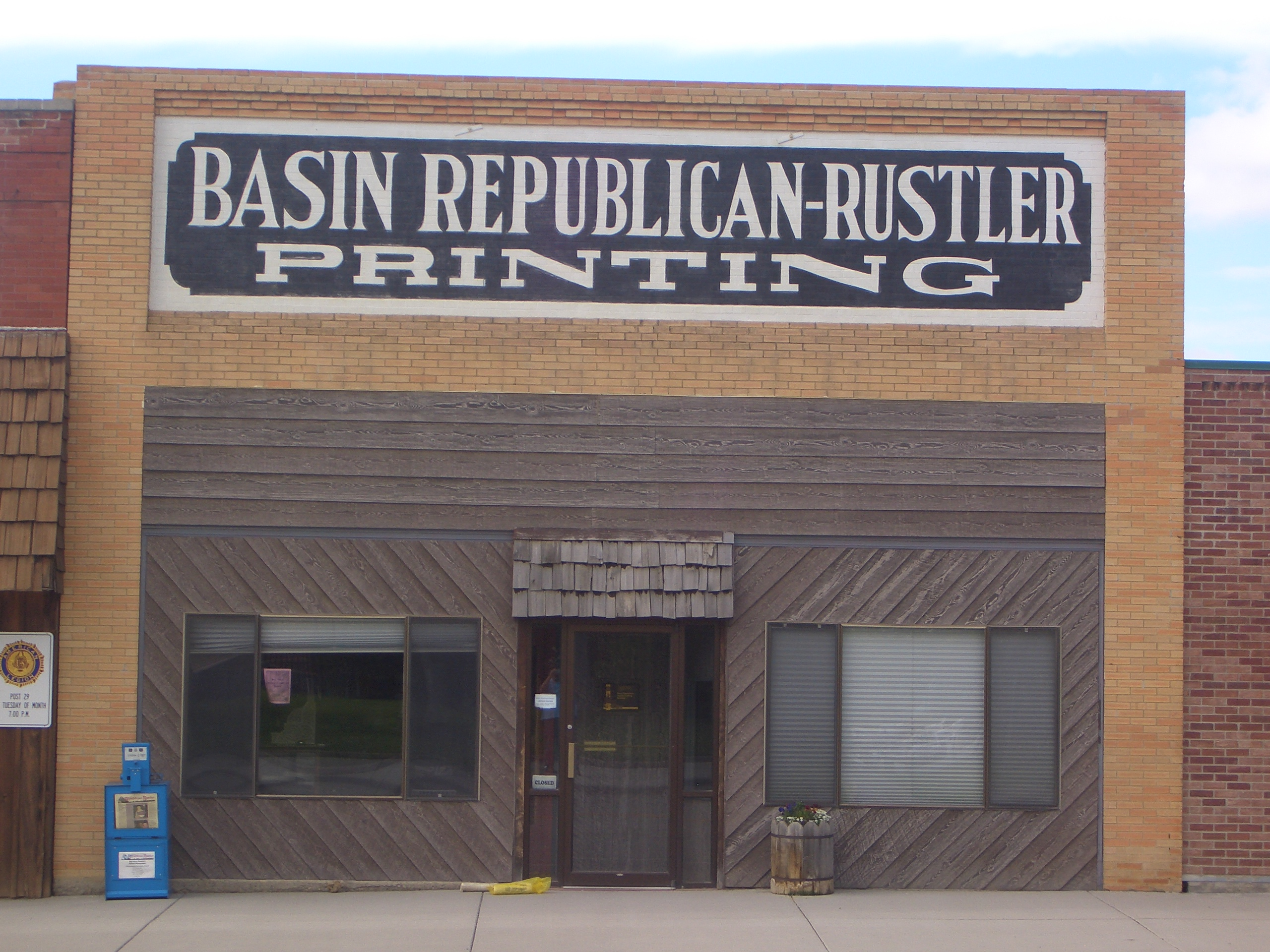

- Location within Wyoming Location within the United States
- Location: 409 W. C St., Basin, Wyoming
- Coordinates: 44°22′51″N 108°2′22″W
- Area: less than one acre
- NRHP reference No.: 76001948
- Added to NRHP: July 19, 1976

The Basin Republican-Rustler Printing Building is a historic newspaper printing building located at 409 West C Street in Basin, Wyoming, United States. The building was used to print the Basin Republican-Rustler, Basin's weekly newspaper. The Republican-Rustler formed from the merger of two newspapers, the Rustler and the Republican. The Rustler was founded in 1889 in Bonanza and was the first newspaper in the Bighorn Basin; it was published in Hyattville before moving to Basin in 1900. The Republican was first printed in 1905 as a political counterpoint to the Rustler, which had affiliated with the Democratic Party. The two newspapers merged in 1928, four years after the Republican had moved into the Printing Building. The building contains a number of historic printing machines, many of which are still operational; its collection includes linotype machines and an Intertype machine as well as a number of other printing presses and devices used to assemble newspapers.

The building was added to the National Register of Historic Places on July 19, 1976.

== See also ==
- Eagle Newspaper Office
- Pocahontas Times Print Shop
- United States Post Office (Basin, Wyoming)
- National Register of Historic Places listings in Big Horn County, Wyoming
