= Prairie Dog Creek Bridge =

- U.S. National Register of Historic Places
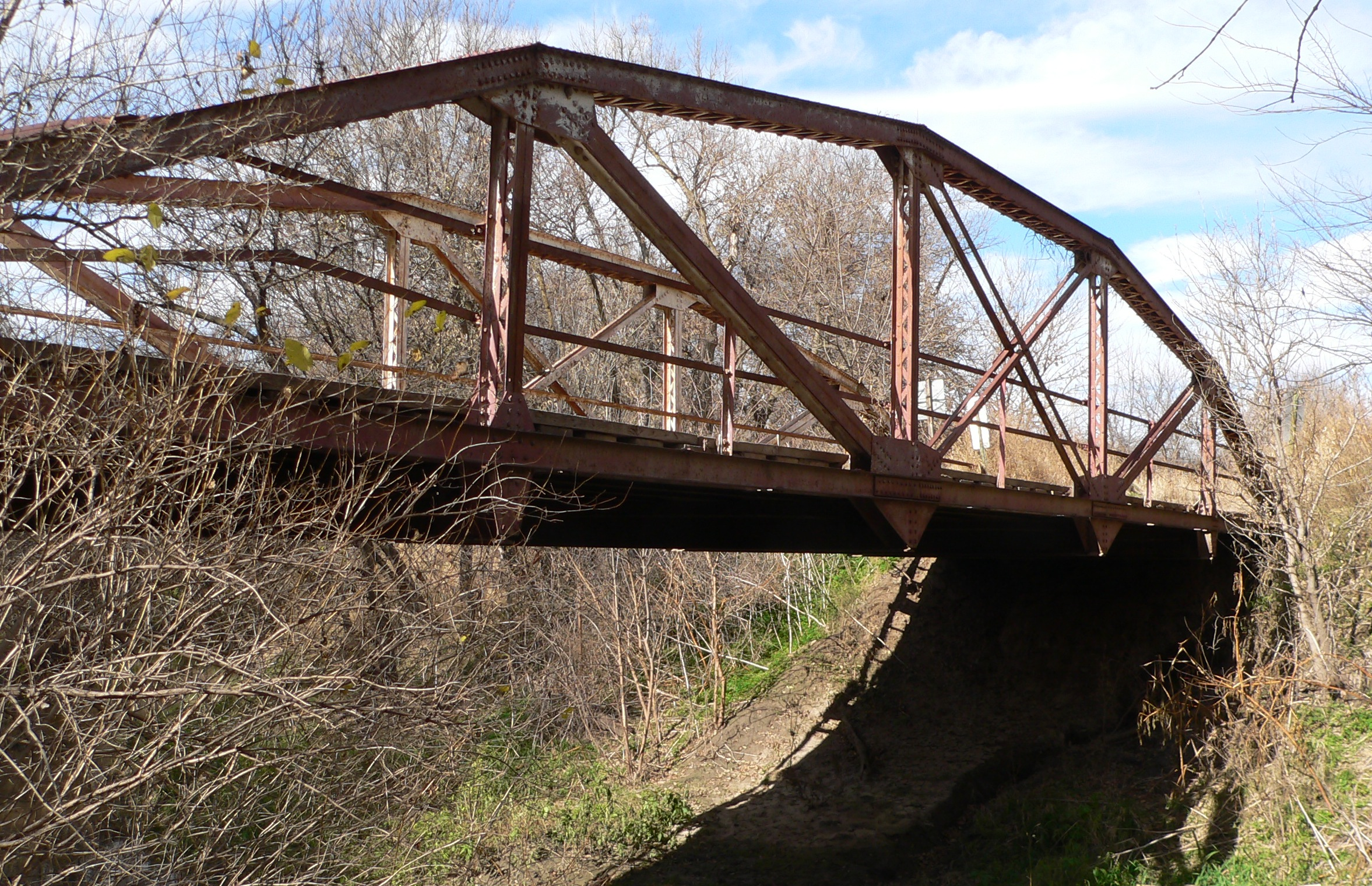
- Bridge in 2009

- Location within Nebraska Location within the United States
- Location: Township road over Prairie Dog Creek, 8.5 miles south and 1 mile west of Orleans
- Nearest city: Orleans, Nebraska
- Coordinates: 40°0′16″N 99°28′48″W
- Area: less than one acre
- Built: 1913
- Built by: Monarch Engineering Co., Jones & Laughlin Steel Co.
- Architectural style: Camelback pony truss
- MPS: Highway Bridges in Nebraska MPS
- NRHP reference No.: 92000712
- Added to NRHP: June 29, 1992

The Prairie Dog Creek Bridge, near Orleans, Nebraska, is a historic Camelback pony truss bridge that was built in 1913. It was designed and built by Monarch Engineering Co., with its steel was fabricated by Jones & Laughlin Steel Co. Also designated as NEHBS No. HN00-53, it was listed on the National Register of Historic Places in 1992.

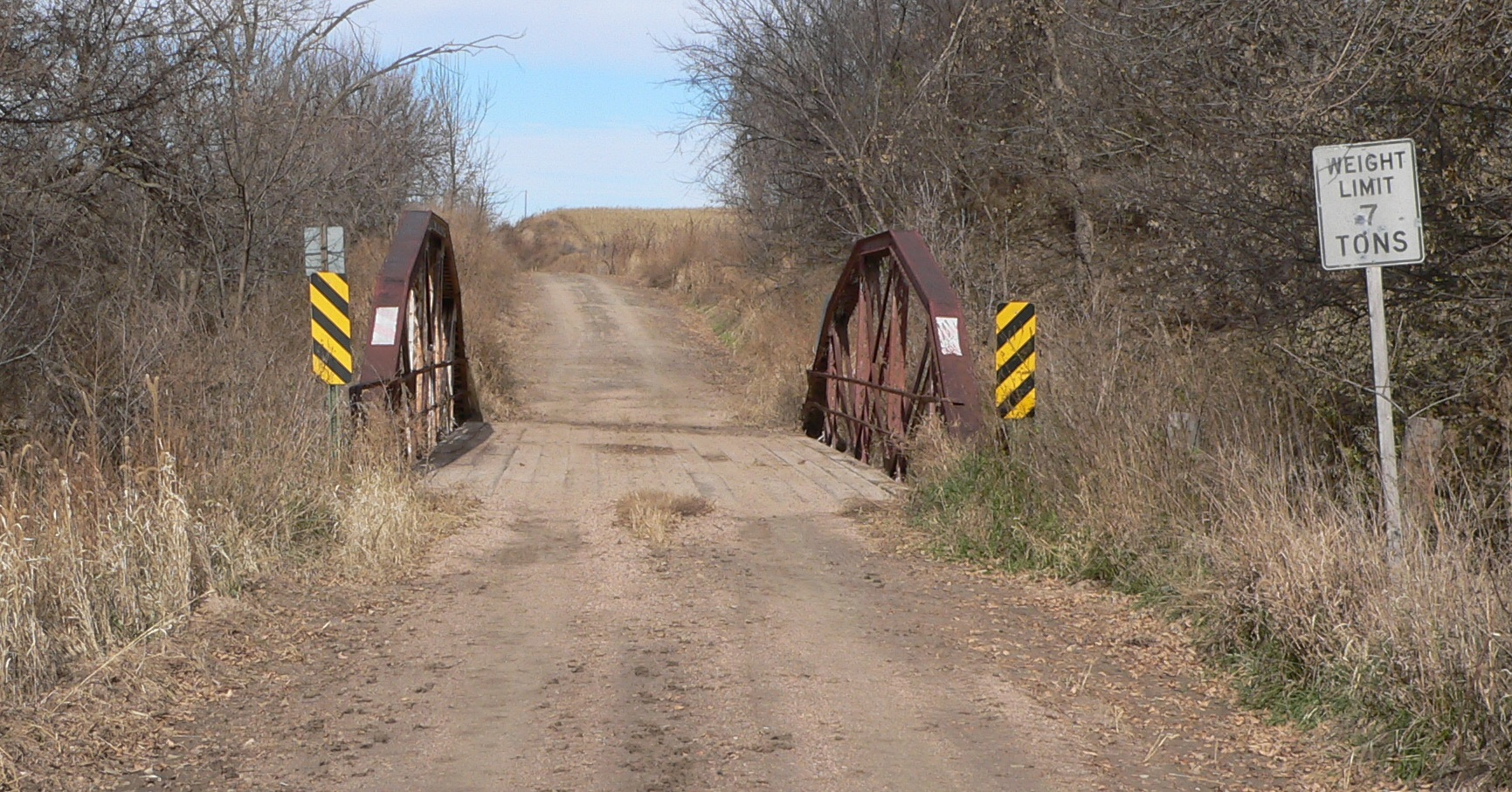

The bridge is a single rigid-connected Camelback pony truss and has carried vehicular traffic since 1913.
