= Huntersville Presbyterian Church =

Historic church in West Virginia, United States

- U.S. National Register of Historic Places
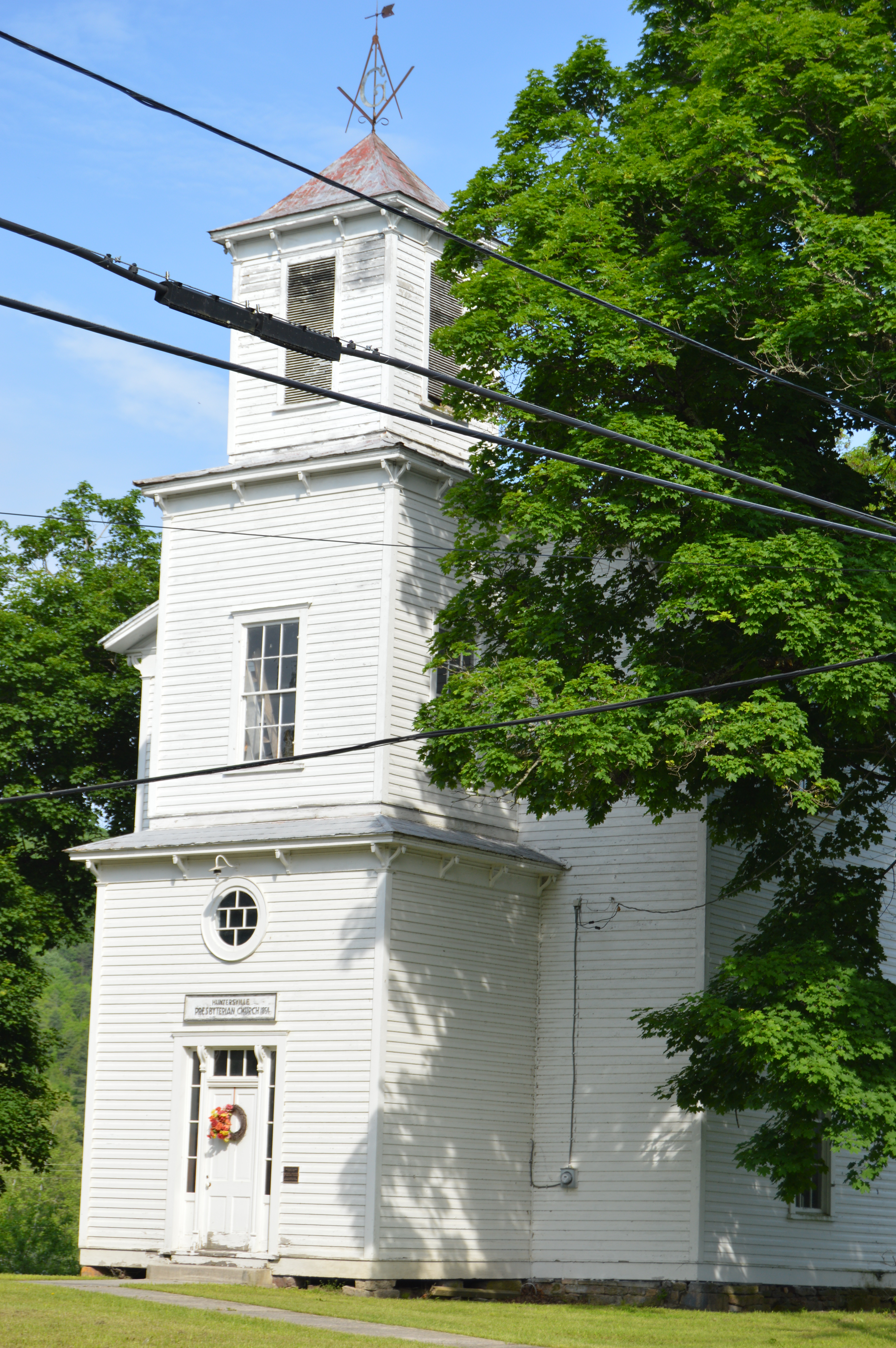
- Front of the church

- Location within West Virginia Location within the United States
- Location: CR 21 at WV 39, Huntersville, West Virginia
- Coordinates: 38°11′23″N 80°1′6″W
- Area: 0.8 acres (0.32 ha)
- Built: 1854, 1895-1896
- Architect: McKeever, E.O.
- Architectural style: Mixed (more Than 2 Styles From Different Periods)
- NRHP reference No.: 78002809
- Added to NRHP: October 4, 1978

Huntersville Presbyterian Church is a historic Presbyterian church on CR 21 at WV 39 in Huntersville, Pocahontas County, West Virginia. It was built in 1854, and is a two-story, rectangular frame building, two bays wide and three bays deep. It features a three-story bell tower centered on the front facade and added in 1896. The second floor was added at the same time by Huntersville Masonic Lodge Number 65 for use as a lodge hall.

It was listed on the National Register of Historic Places in 1978.
