= Rio Grande Bridge at San Juan Pueblo =

- U.S. National Register of Historic Places
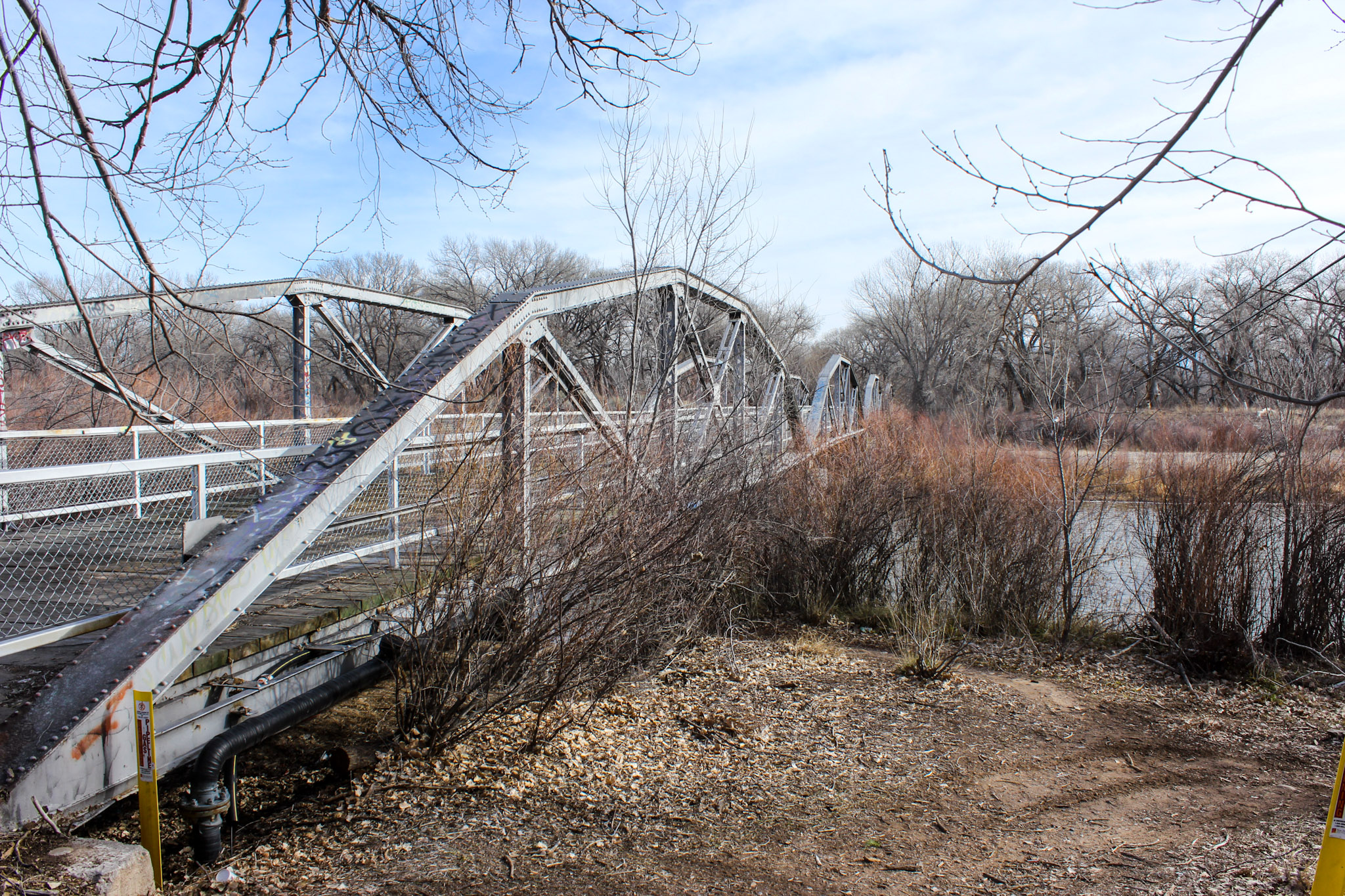

- Location within New Mexico
- Nearest city: Alcalde, New Mexico
- Coordinates: 36.056241°N 106.082516°W
- Area: less than one acre
- Built: 1925
- Built by: Monarch Engineering Company
- Architectural style: Parker pony truss
- MPS: Historic Highway Bridges of New Mexico MPS
- NRHP reference No.: 97000738
- Added to NRHP: August 14, 1997

The Rio Grande Bridge at San Juan Pueblo (Tewa: Tehpʼôekophéh), crossing the Rio Grande near Alcalde, New Mexico, is a Parker pony truss bridge built in 1925. It was listed on the National Register of Historic Places in 1997.

It is a four-span bridge located about 200 yards (180 m) south of New Mexico State Road 74, about .5 miles (0.80 km) west of San Juan Pueblo. In the former alignment of the road, it served NM 74.

It was designed by the Monarch Engineering Company of Denver, and consists of four spans, each 100 feet (30 m) in length, each consisting of five panels 20 feet (6.1 m) in length. Each of the panels has a top chord at a different diagonal angle, together forming the polygonal top design of a Parker truss.
