= Hanson Site =

- U.S. National Register of Historic Places
- Nearest city: Shell, Wyoming
- Area: 160 acres (65 ha)
- NRHP reference No.: 78002817
- Added to NRHP: December 15, 1978

The Hanson Site includes two separate areas of Paleoindian archaeological sites in the northern Bighorn Basin of Wyoming, United States. The southern Hanson I site was investigated first in 1973, finding evidence of tool working and stone flakes at a campsite. The northern Hanson II site is larger and includes the sites of lodges. Activity in these areas dates to 10,700 +/- 670 years ago to 10,080 +/- 300 years ago. The Hanson site is also of interest in paleontology, with animal fossil remains at deeper levels. The site was placed on the National Register of Historic Places on December 15, 1978.
