= Eagle Newspaper Office =

- U.S. National Register of Historic Places
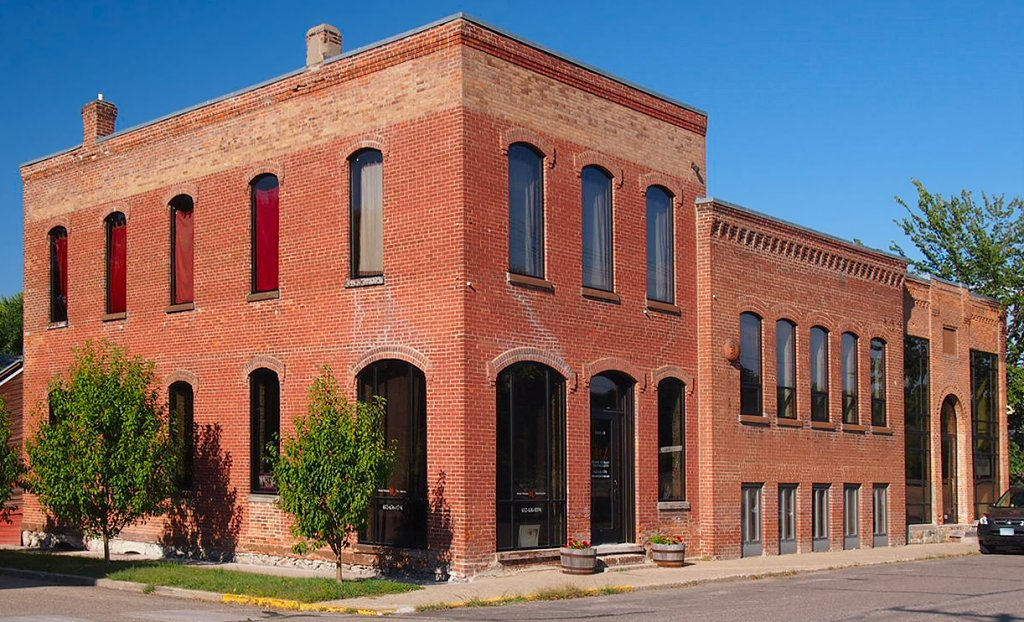
- Eagle Newspaper Office from the southwest, with the original section leftmost

- Location within Minnesota Location within the United States
- Location: 300 Railroad Avenue, Delano, Minnesota
- Coordinates: 45°2′27″N 93°47′10″W
- Area: Less than one acre
- Built: 1883–1885
- Architectural style: Italianate
- MPS: Wright County MRA
- NRHP reference No.: 79001265
- Added to NRHP: December 11, 1979

The Eagle Newspaper Office is a historic commercial complex in Delano, Minnesota, United States, comprising three adjacent buildings constructed 1883–1885. It served as the headquarters of the Delano Eagle newspaper and a print shop specializing in railroad and commercial printing, as well as bookbinding. The complex was listed on the National Register of Historic Places in 1979 for its local significance in the theme of communication. It was nominated as the home of Delano's oldest business and a newspaper that had served the community continuously since its founding in 1872.

== Description ==
The three sections of the Eagle Newspaper Office are constructed of red brick in simplified Italianate style. The western section is the original, built in 1883. The eastern building was constructed in 1884 and the central in 1885.

== See also ==
- Basin Republican-Rustler Printing Building
- Pocahontas Times Print Shop
- National Register of Historic Places listings in Wright County, Minnesota
