= Shell Creek =

Coordinates: 44°30′35″N 108°03′20″W

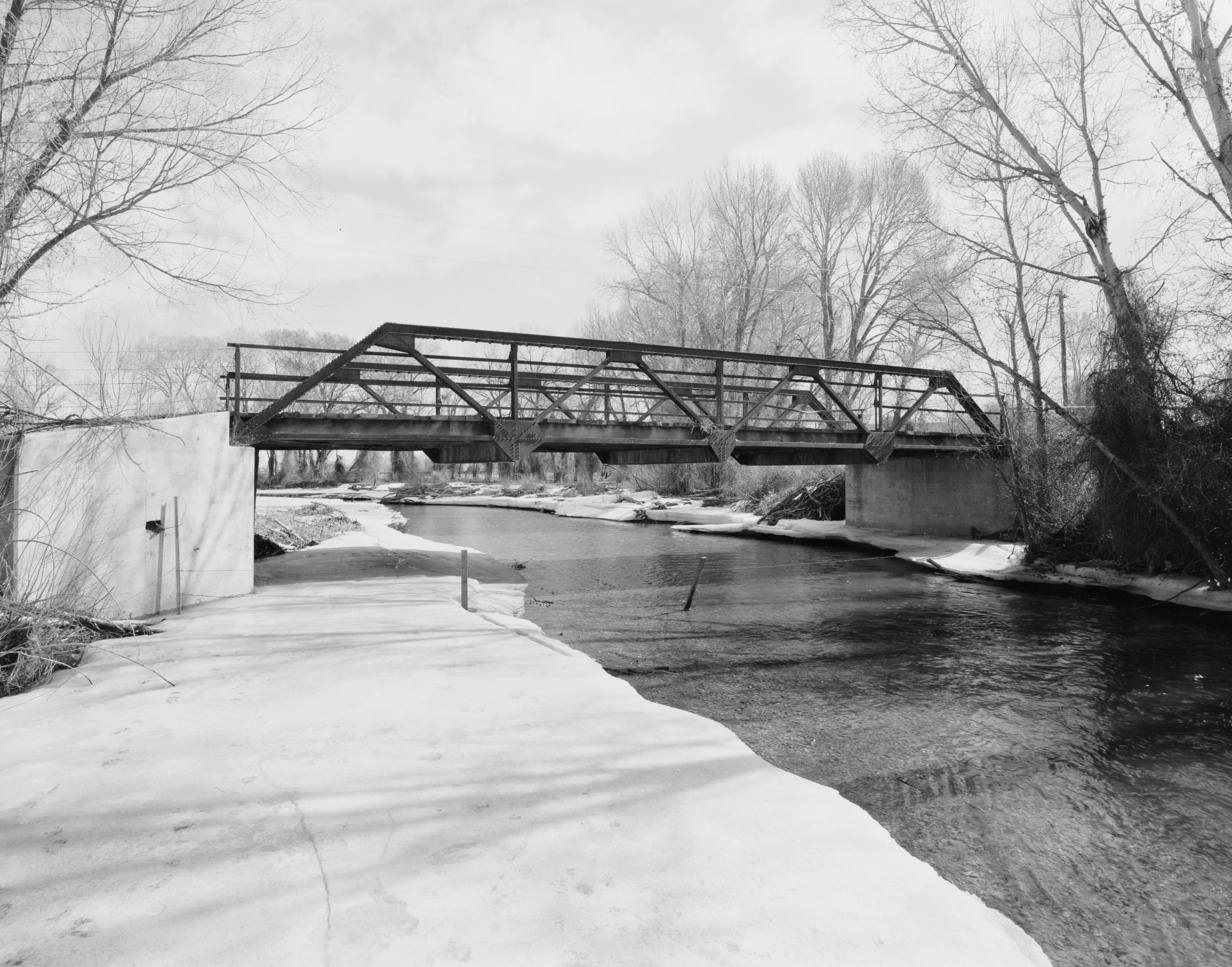
EJE Bridge over Shell Creek

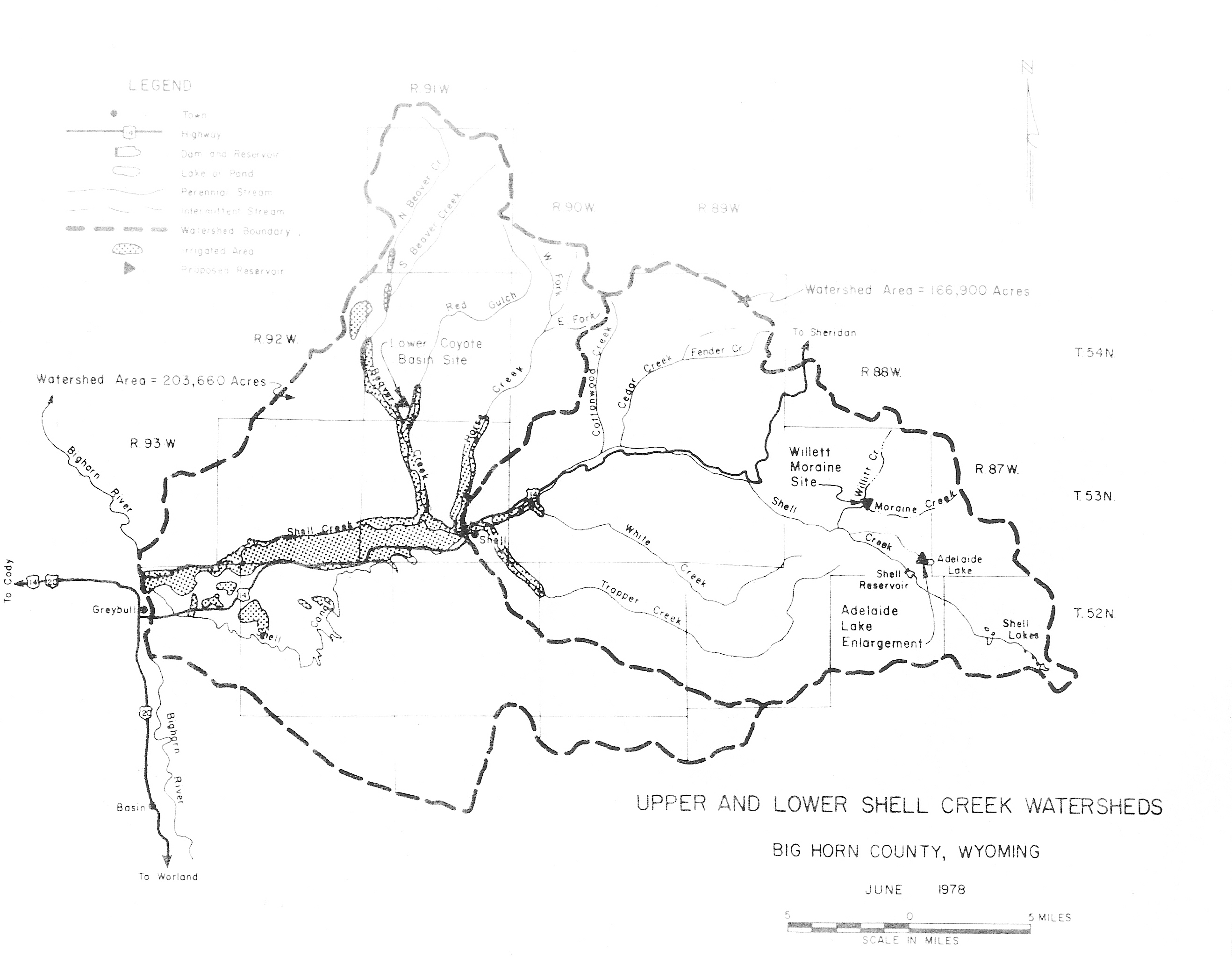
Map of Shell Creek Watershed

Shell Creek is a tributary of the Bighorn River, approximately 50 mi (80 km) long, in Wyoming in the United States. Lying entirely within Big Horn County, Shell Creek begins above the Shell Lakes in the Bighorn Mountains. Starting at an elevation of over 11,000 ft (3,400 m), it drops to below 3,800 ft (1,200 m) as it descends the western side of the Bighorn Mountains through Shell Canyon and enters the Big Horn Basin near Shell, Wyoming. It flows into the Bighorn River, a tributary of the Yellowstone River, just north of Greybull.

== Watershed ==
The Shell Creek watershed consists of 370,500 acres (1,499 km^{2}) of native rangeland (73%), forest (24%), irrigated cropland, pasture and hayland (3%). There are over 10,500 acres (42 km^{2}) of irrigated lands in the Shell Creek watershed; the greater part (92%) of which is in the lower portion-downstream from the town of Shell. About 7,500 acres (30 km^{2}) are irrigated from Shell Creek itself. Also, the part of the creek is diverted above Shell and conveyed via pipeline to the town of Greybull as a municipal water supply.

== Transportation ==
US 14, the Bighorn Scenic Byway, travels along Shell Creek through the canyon. This modern highway is relatively young. Much of it was completed in the mid-1960s, with major improvements in the 1980s.

== See also ==
- Shell Falls
