= Pocahontas Times Print Shop =

- U.S. National Register of Historic Places
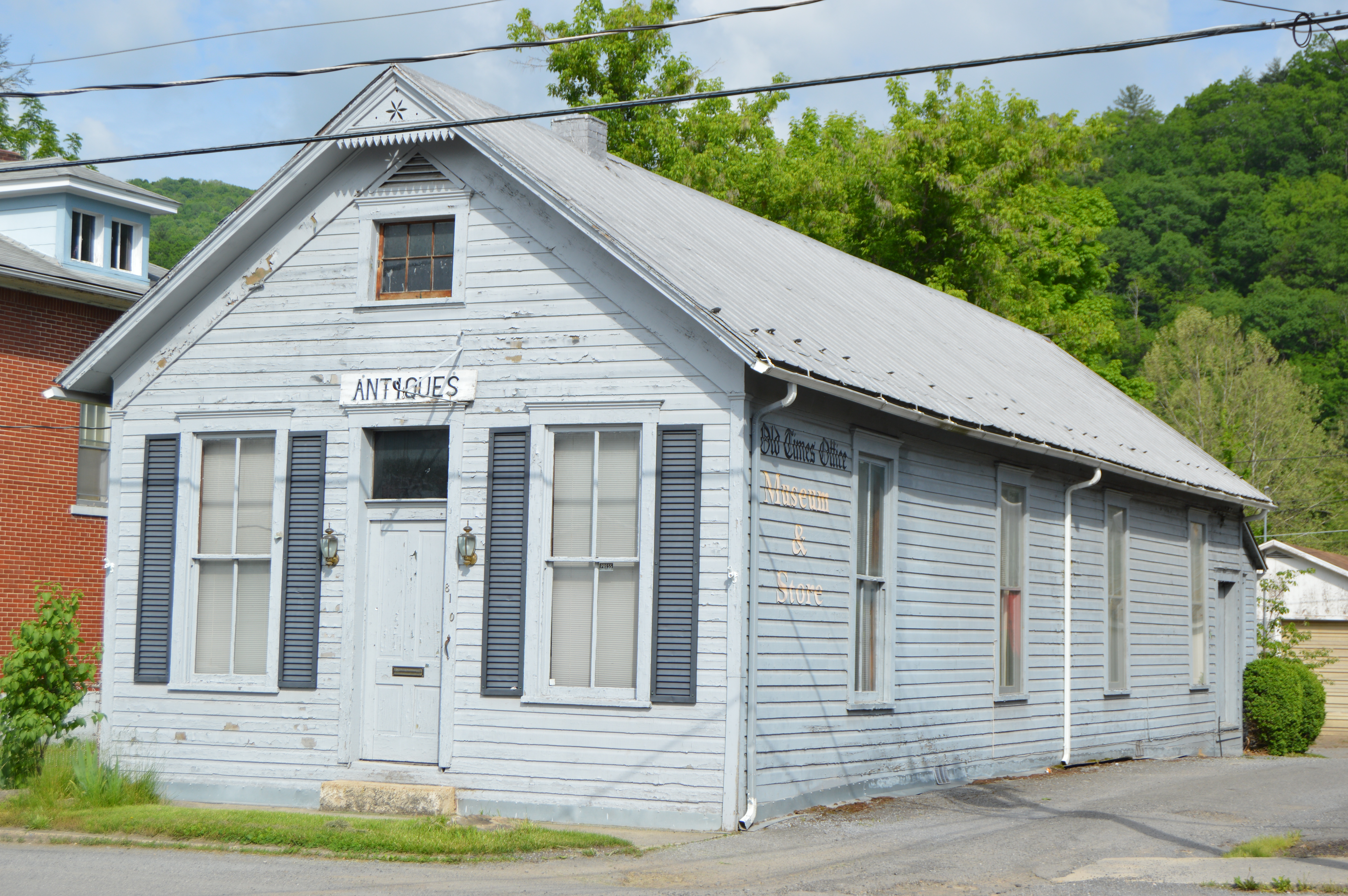
- Front and northern side

- Location within West Virginia Location within the United States
- Location: 810 2nd Ave., Marlinton, West Virginia
- Coordinates: 38°13′23″N 80°5′42″W
- Area: 0.5 acres (0.20 ha)
- Built: 1900
- NRHP reference No.: 77001379
- Added to NRHP: September 22, 1977

Pocahontas Times Print Shop is a historic building located at Marlinton, Pocahontas County, West Virginia. It was built in 1900, and is a one-story, rectangular frame building measuring approximately 21 feet by 75 feet. It was built to house The Pocahontas Times newspaper operations. As late as the 1970s, it housed a paper folder and press installed around 1911. The Pocahontas Times has been published since 1882.

It was listed on the National Register of Historic Places in 1977.

== See also ==
- Basin Republican-Rustler Printing Building
- Eagle Newspaper Office
- National Register of Historic Places listings in Pocahontas County, West Virginia
