= Bear Creek Ranch Medicine Wheel =

- Bear Creek Ranch Medicine Wheel (48BH48)
- U.S. National Register of Historic Places
- Nearest city: Greybull, Wyoming
- Area: less than one acre
- NRHP reference No.: 87000661
- Added to NRHP: May 4, 1987

The Bear Creek Ranch Medicine Wheel is a Native American medicine wheel near Greybull, Wyoming. It consists of a circular arrangement of stones centered around a central circle, with stone lines radiating from the inner to the outer circles, in a spoke-like manner. The site was placed on the National Register of Historic Places on May 4, 1987.
