= EFP Bridge over Owl Creek =

- U.S. National Register of Historic Places
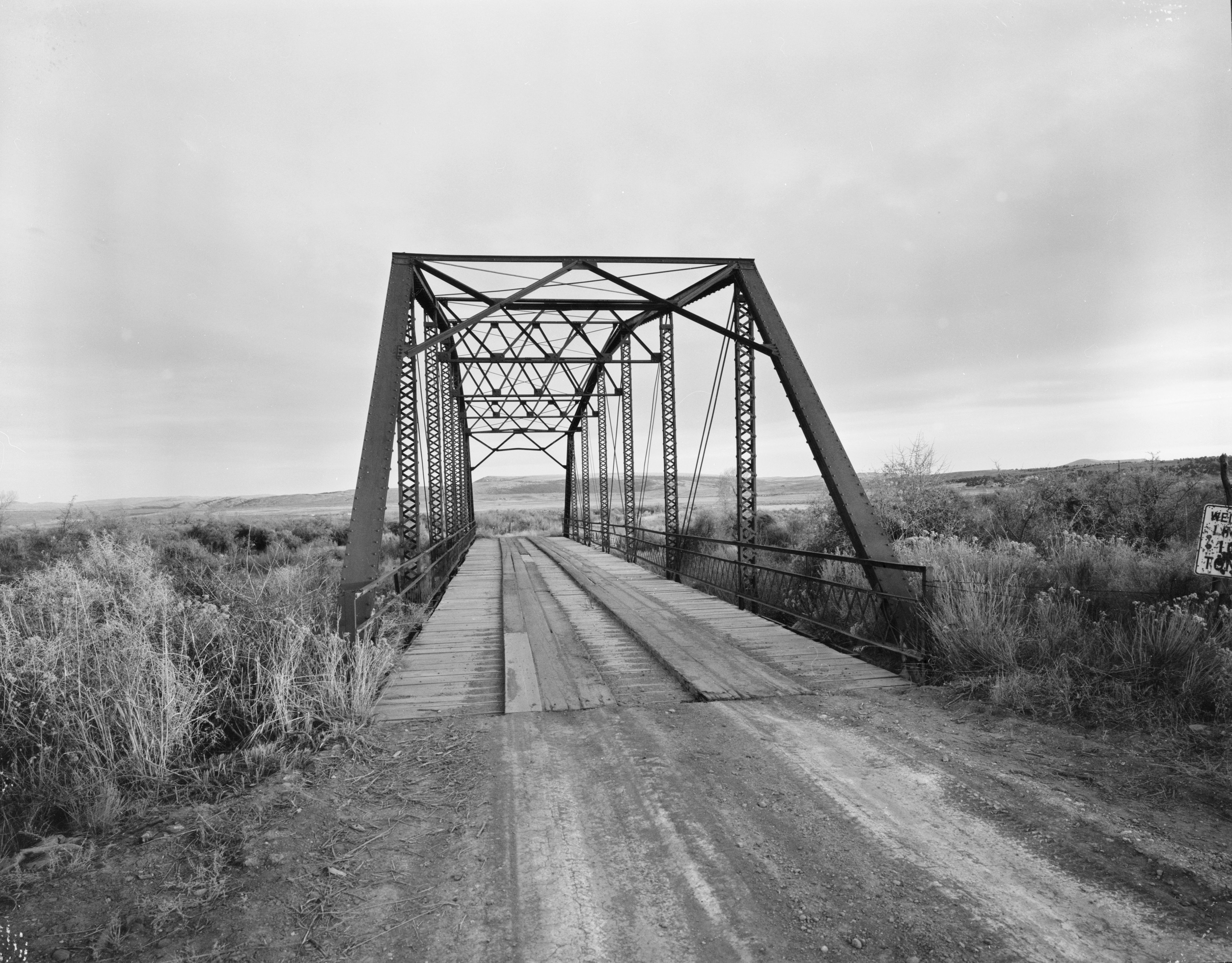

- Location within Wyoming Location within the United States
- Nearest city: Thermopolis, Wyoming
- Coordinates: 43°41′28″N 108°23′34″W
- Built: 1920
- Architect: Monarch Engineering Company
- Architectural style: Parker (camelback) through truss
- MPS: Vehicular Truss and Arch Bridges in Wyoming TR
- NRHP reference No.: 85000424
- Added to NRHP: February 22, 1985

The EFP Bridge spans Owl Creek in Hot Springs County, Wyoming. The bridge was erected in 1919–20 by the Monarch Engineering Company of Denver and spans 124 feet (38 m) with a total length of 126 feet (38 m). The rigid 7-panel Parker (camelback) through-truss was nominated for inclusion on the National Register of Historic Places as one of forty bridges throughout Wyoming that collectively illustrate steel truss construction, a technique of bridge design that has become obsolete since the mid-twentieth century. The bridge is supported on sandstone abutments and has a timber deck, 15 feet (4.6 m) in width.

The EFP Bridge was added to the National Register of Historic Places in 1985.

== See also ==
- List of bridges documented by the Historic American Engineering Record in Wyoming
