= United States Post Office (Basin, Wyoming) =

- US Post Office--Basin Main
- U.S. National Register of Historic Places
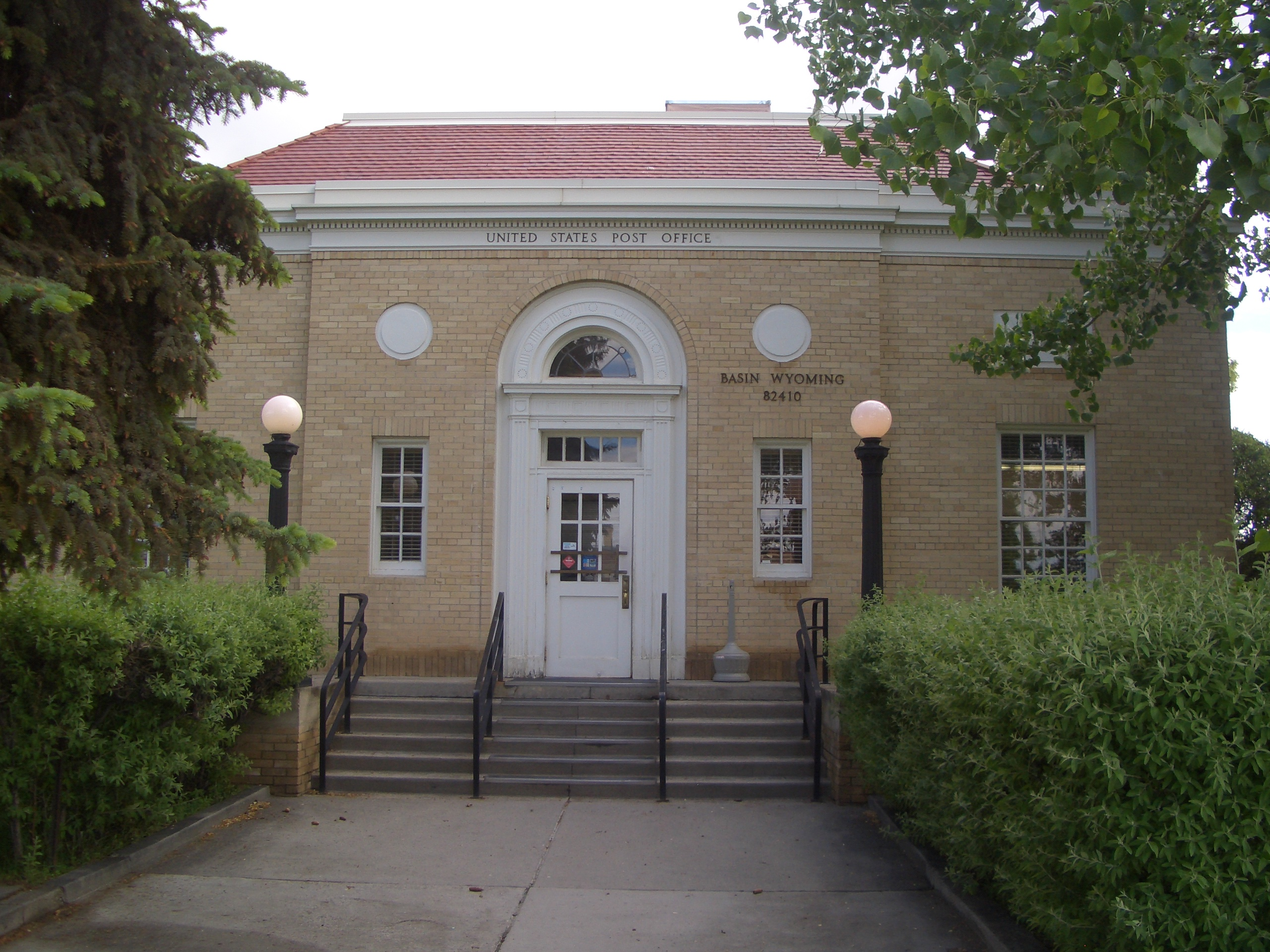
- Basin Main Post Office

- Location within Wyoming Location within the United States
- Location: 402 W C St, Basin, Wyoming
- Coordinates: 44°22′53″N 108°2′21″W
- Built: 1919
- Architectural style: Classical Revival
- MPS: Historic US Post Offices in Wyoming, 1900--1941, TR
- NRHP reference No.: 87000779
- Added to NRHP: May 22, 1987

The Basin Main Post Office in Basin, Wyoming was built in 1919 as part of a facilities improvement program by the United States Post Office Department. The post office in Basin was nominated to the National Register of Historic Places as part of a thematic study comprising twelve Wyoming post offices built to standardized USPO plans in the early twentieth century.

== See also ==
- Basin Republican-Rustler Printing Building
- National Register of Historic Places listings in Big Horn County, Wyoming
