= Paint Rock Canyon Archeological Landscape District =

- U.S. National Register of Historic Places
- U.S. Historic district
- Nearest city: Hyattville, Wyoming
- Area: 5,340 acres (2,160 ha)
- NRHP reference No.: 80004881
- Added to NRHP: July 12, 1990

The Paint Rock Canyon Archeological Landscape District is a 5,340-acre (2,160 ha) area of Native American archeological sites on the west side of the Bighorn Mountains of Wyoming, United States. The area contains sites ranging from the late Paleoindian period of about 9000 years before present to late Prehistoric times. The sites include open campsites and rock shelters. The district was added to the National Register of Historic Places on July 12, 1990.
