= EJP County Line Bridge =

- EJP County Line Bridge (Nowood River)
- U.S. National Register of Historic Places
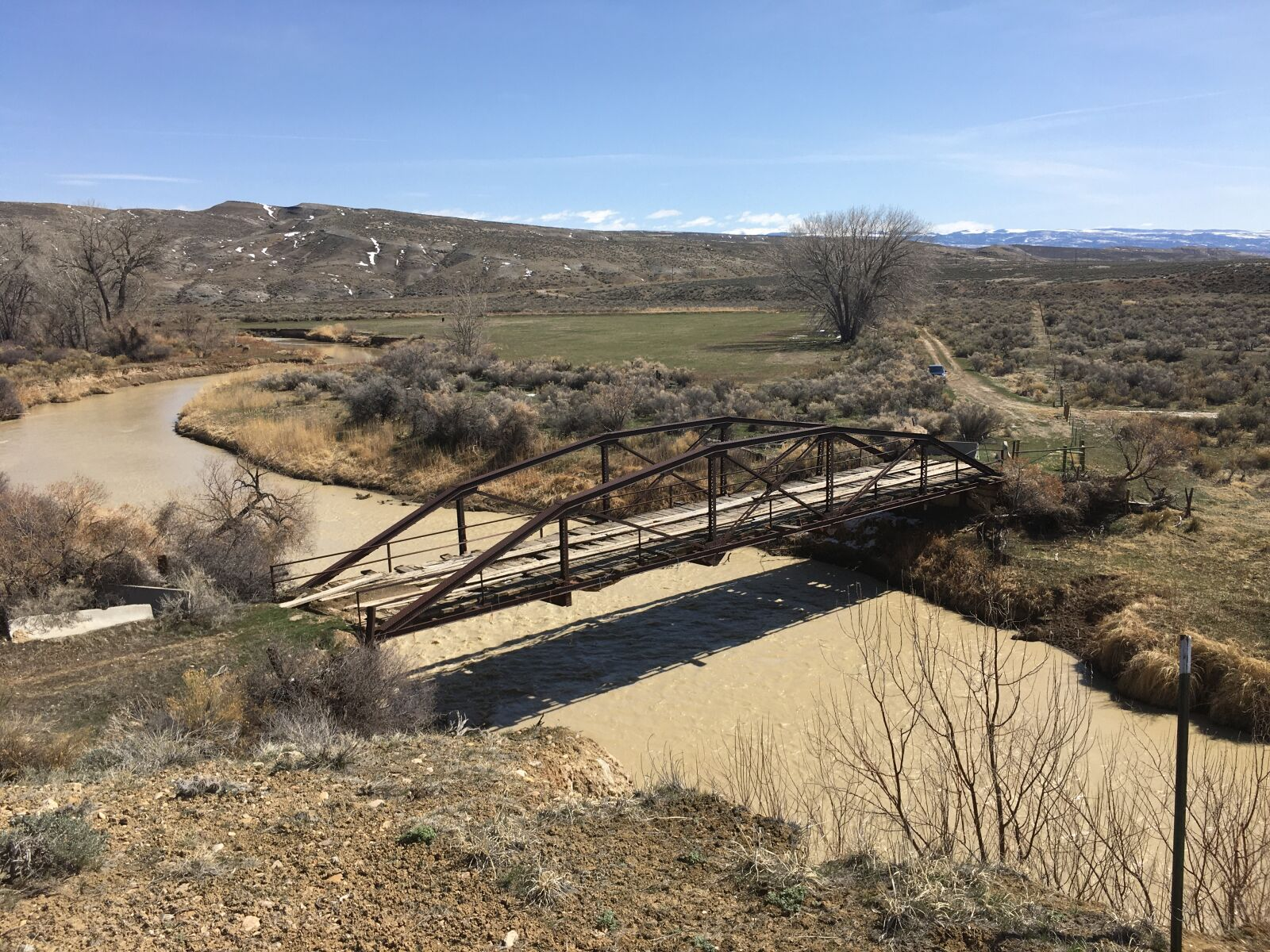

- Location within Wyoming Location within the United States
- Nearest city: Hyattville, Wyoming
- Coordinates: 44°9′59″N 107°41′1″W
- Area: less than one acre
- Built: 1917
- Architect: Monarch Engineering Co.
- Architectural style: Camelback pony truss
- MPS: Vehicular Truss and Arch Bridges in Wyoming TR
- NRHP reference No.: 85000412
- Added to NRHP: February 22, 1985

The EJP County Line Bridge is a Camelback pony truss bridge located near Hyattville, Wyoming, which carries Big Horn County Road CN9-60 across the Nowood River. The bridge was built in 1917 by the Monarch Engineering Company. As the bridge was originally thought to connect Big Horn and Washakie Counties, the two counties split the cost of the bridge, with each paying for one abutment and the two splitting the cost of the superstructure; this is the only recorded case of two Wyoming counties purchasing a bridge in such a way. Further surveys determined that the bridge is actually located entirely within Big Horn County. At 102 feet (31 m) long, the bridge is the longest Camelback truss bridge in Wyoming.

The bridge was added to the National Register of Historic Places in 1985. It was one of several bridges added to the National Register for their role in the history of Wyoming bridge construction.
