= American Legion Hall, Post 32 =

- U.S. National Register of Historic Places
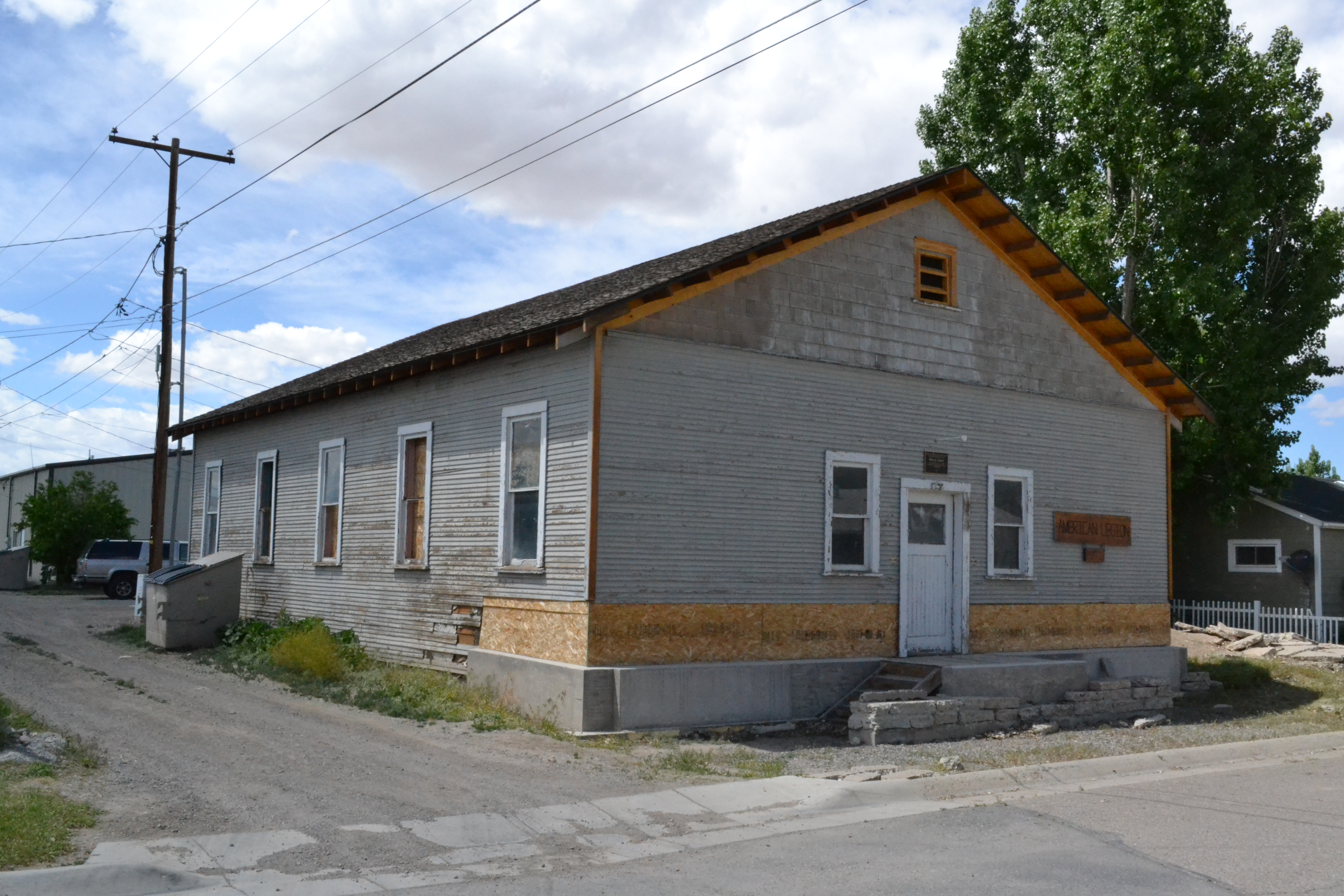

- Location within Wyoming
- Location: 130 N. 5th Street, Greybull, Wyoming
- Coordinates: 44°29′26″N 106°8′24″W
- Area: less than one acre
- Built: 1922
- NRHP reference No.: 14000386
- Added to NRHP: June 27, 2014

The American Legion Hall, Post 32 is a prominent social center in Greybull, Wyoming. Built in 1922 as a temporary church, it became an American Legion hall in 1935. Used as overflow space by nearby schools, it serves a diverse range of functions in the community.

== History ==
The hall was built in 1922 by the Trinity Methodist Episcopal Church as a temporary sanctuary while their new church was built. It later functioned as a social hall for the church. Since it was located in close proximity to town schools, it was used as overflow space. The town used the hall as a polling place until at least 1955. The American Legion bought the building in 1935, after the church congregation abandoned their church project. Although a much larger community center was built by the town with a WPA grant in 1936, the Legion Hall remained popular for smaller gatherings and for events that featured a speaker. Organizations as diverse as the railroad union and the Odd Fellows met there. In later years, it was used for day care, until 1995, and used for storage after that. In 2015, work started on plans for rehabilitation of the structure.

== Description ==
The Legion Hall is a simple framed building, about 54 feet (16 m) by 34 feet (10 m), with a gabled roof. The gables are clad in wood shingles, while the body of the building is sheathed in closely lapping clapboards. A tightly arranged grouping of windows flanks the main entrance at the gable end, facing the street on the east side. Five evenly spaced windows line the south elevation, and the west elevation is blank except for a small window in the gable. An annex measuring 27 feet (8.2 m) by 13 feet (4.0 m) covers much of the north elevation, housing accessory spaces. The main hall is about twelve feet in height and was originally covered in lath and plaster. Poor structural performance of the original scissor trusses led to the installation of columns in the main hall to support the roof.

Post 32 of the American Legion was placed on the National Register of Historic Places on June 24, 2014.
