= Rairden Bridge =

- U.S. National Register of Historic Places
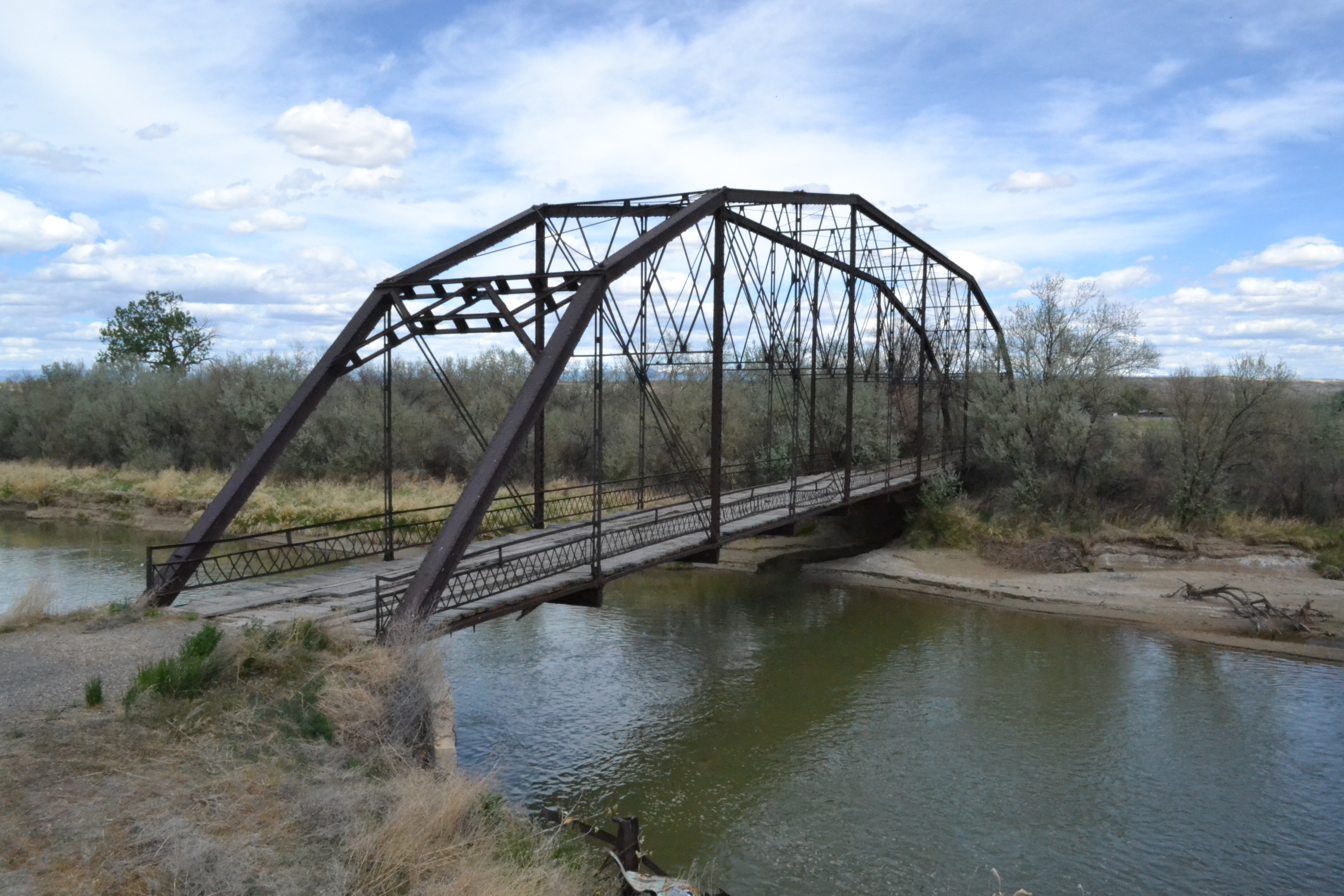

- Location within Wyoming Location within the United States
- Nearest city: Manderson, Wyoming
- Coordinates: 44°11′40″N 107°54′53″W
- Area: less than one acre
- Built: 1916
- Built by: Monarch Engineering Co.
- Architectural style: Pennsylvania through truss
- MPS: Vehicular Truss and Arch Bridges in Wyoming TR
- NRHP reference No.: 85000414
- Added to NRHP: February 22, 1985

The Rairden Bridge is a Pennsylvania through truss near Manderson, Wyoming, which crosses the Big Horn River. The bridge was built in 1916 by the Monarch Engineering Company. The bridge cost $30,986, making it one of the most expensive bridges commissioned by a Wyoming county government. The bridge was also the longest in Big Horn County's road system at 250 feet (76 m) and is the longest surviving county bridge in Wyoming. In addition, it is one of two Pennsylvania through truss bridges remaining in Wyoming. The bridge was replaced by a new structure and abandoned in 1979.

The bridge was added to the National Register of Historic Places on February 22, 1985. It was one of several bridges added to the NRHP for its role in the history of bridge construction in Wyoming.
