= Southsider Shelter =

- U.S. National Register of Historic Places
- Nearest city: Ten Sleep, Wyoming
- NRHP reference No.: 12000470
- Added to NRHP: August 1, 2012

The Southsider Shelter is a Native American rock shelter archeological site on the east side of the Bighorn Basin in Big Horn County, Wyoming, United States. The site was occupied from the late Paleoindian period to the Late Prehistoric period. Artifacts include projectile points and chipped stone. The site was added to the National Register of Historic Places on August 1, 2012.
