= Shell, Wyoming =

- CDP
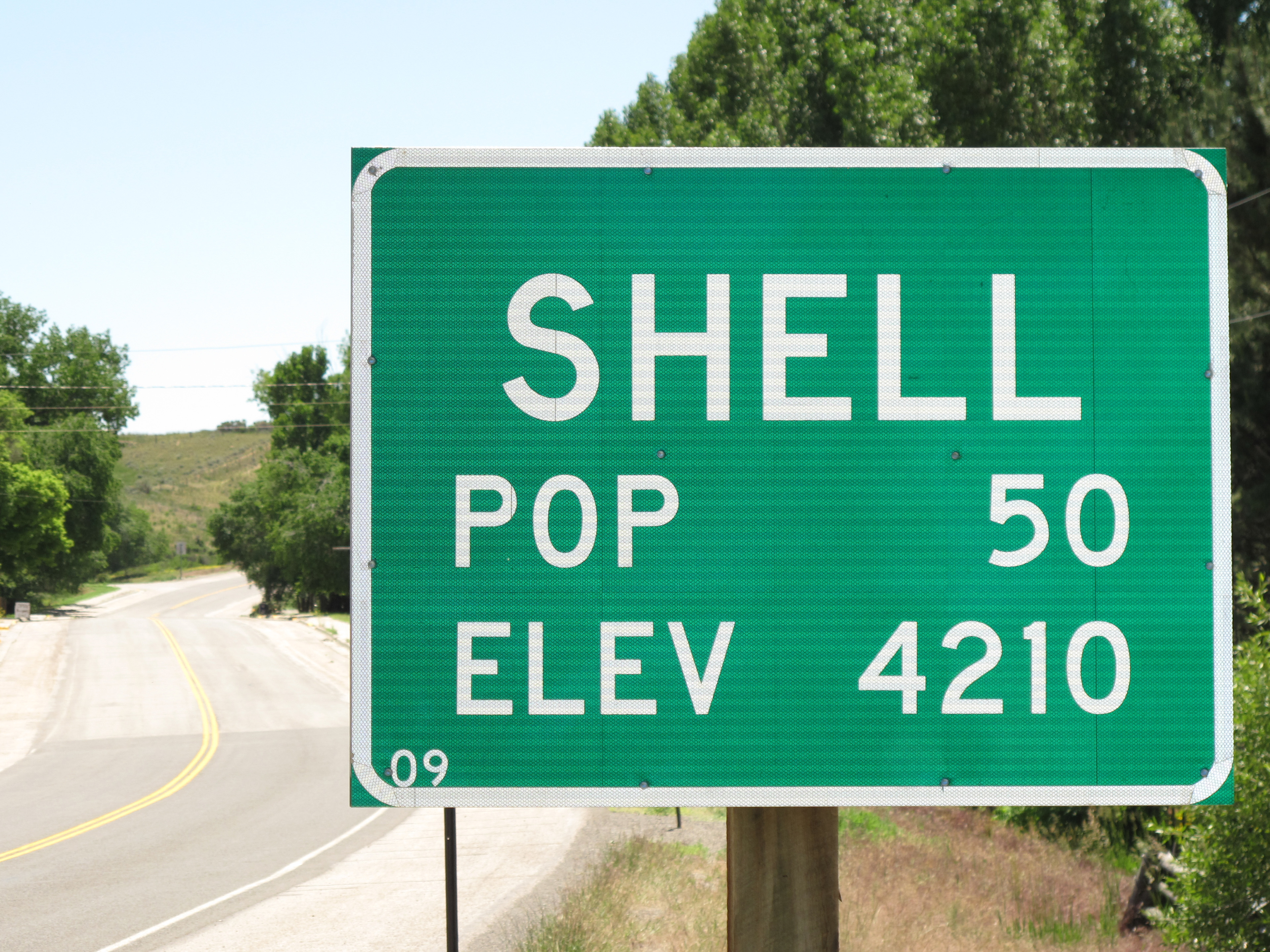
- Sign in Shell

- Location within the state of Wyoming
- Coordinates: 44°32′04″N 107°47′04″W
- Country: United States
- State: Wyoming
- County: Big Horn

Area
  - Total: 1.14 sq mi (2.96 km^{2})
  - Land: 1.14 sq mi (2.96 km^{2})
  - Water: 0 sq mi (0 km^{2})
- Elevation: 4,196 ft (1,279 m)

Population (2010)
  - Total: 83
  - Density: 73/sq mi (28/km^{2})
- Time zone: UTC-7 (Mountain (MST))
  - Summer (DST): UTC-6 (MDT)
- ZIP codes: 82441
- GNIS feature ID: 2629282

Shell is a census-designated place (CDP) in Big Horn County, Wyoming, United States. The population was 83 at the 2010 Census.

The community is named for the abundance of fossil shells located in the area. Nearby exposed formations such as the Cloverly Formation and the Morrison Formation have yielded numerous fossils of dinosaurs and other animals. Located to the west of the town is the Red Gulch Dinosaur Tracksite, a rare collection of dinosaur tracks from the Jurassic period.

Shell is home to the Iowa State University geology field station.

== Geography ==
According to the United States Census Bureau, in 2010 the CDP has a total area of 1.1 square miles (2.96 km^{2}), all land.

Shell is located at the base of the Big Horn Mountains, at the mouth of Shell Canyon. Nearby Shell Creek rises in the Big Horn Mountains and joins the Big Horn River just north of Greybull.

== Climate ==
According to the Köppen Climate Classification system, Shell has a cold semi-arid climate, abbreviated "BSk" on climate maps. The hottest temperature recorded in Shell was 106 °F (41 °C) on July 14, 2002, and June 14, 2021, while the coldest temperature recorded was −43 °F (−42 °C) on December 21, 1983.

Climate data for Shell, Wyoming, 1991–2020 normals, extremes 1972–present
Month	Jan	Feb	Mar	Apr	May	Jun	Jul	Aug	Sep	Oct	Nov	Dec	Year
Record high °F (°C)	61 (16)	67 (19)	78 (26)	88 (31)	93 (34)	106 (41)	106 (41)	104 (40)	98 (37)	90 (32)	78 (26)	75 (24)	106 (41)
Mean maximum °F (°C)	50.7 (10.4)	54.4 (12.4)	68.9 (20.5)	78.7 (25.9)	86.0 (30.0)	94.5 (34.7)	99.2 (37.3)	97.4 (36.3)	92.5 (33.6)	81.3 (27.4)	65.5 (18.6)	55.1 (12.8)	99.6 (37.6)
Mean daily maximum °F (°C)	32.7 (0.4)	37.4 (3.0)	49.9 (9.9)	58.7 (14.8)	68.7 (20.4)	79.3 (26.3)	89.1 (31.7)	86.9 (30.5)	75.8 (24.3)	60.2 (15.7)	45. (7)	33.7 (0.9)	59.8 (15.4)
Daily mean °F (°C)	19.5 (−6.9)	24.1 (−4.4)	36.0 (2.2)	44.0 (6.7)	53.9 (12.2)	63.2 (17.3)	71.3 (21.8)	68.9 (20.5)	58.7 (14.8)	44.9 (7.2)	31.7 (−0.2)	20.8 (−6.2)	44.7 (7.1)
Mean daily minimum °F (°C)	6.4 (−14.2)	10.8 (−11.8)	22.2 (−5.4)	29.3 (−1.5)	39.1 (3.9)	47.0 (8.3)	53.5 (11.9)	51.0 (10.6)	41.7 (5.4)	29.7 (−1.3)	18.2 (−7.7)	7.8 (−13.4)	29.7 (−1.3)
Mean minimum °F (°C)	−17.3 (−27.4)	−8.5 (−22.5)	1.8 (−16.8)	17.1 (−8.3)	26.2 (−3.2)	35.8 (2.1)	44.1 (6.7)	40.5 (4.7)	29.3 (−1.5)	13.7 (−10.2)	−2.5 (−19.2)	−9.9 (−23.3)	−19.5 (−28.6)
Record low °F (°C)	−36 (−38)	−36 (−38)	−23 (−31)	−1 (−18)	12 (−11)	28 (−2)	27 (−3)	31 (−1)	12 (−11)	−7 (−22)	−22 (−30)	−43 (−42)	−43 (−42)
Average precipitation inches (mm)	0.47 (12)	0.50 (13)	0.49 (12)	1.05 (27)	1.88 (48)	1.35 (34)	0.72 (18)	0.46 (12)	1.07 (27)	0.99 (25)	0.68 (17)	0.44 (11)	10.10 (257)
Average snowfall inches (cm)	7.3 (19)	6.4 (16)	2.7 (6.9)	1.4 (3.6)	0.0 (0.0)	0.0 (0.0)	0.0 (0.0)	0.0 (0.0)	0.0 (0.0)	0.9 (2.3)	3.9 (9.9)	5.6 (14)	28.2 (71.7)
Average precipitation days (≥ 0.01 in)	4.8	4.2	3.9	6.3	9.5	7.4	4.2	3.8	5.4	5.6	4.6	3.6	63.3
Average snowy days (≥ 0.1 in)	4.0	3.5	1.7	0.7	0.0	0.0	0.0	0.0	0.0	0.5	1.9	3.0	15.3
Source 1: NOAA
Source 2: National Weather Service

== Education ==
Residents are in Big Horn County School District 3.

== Gallery ==
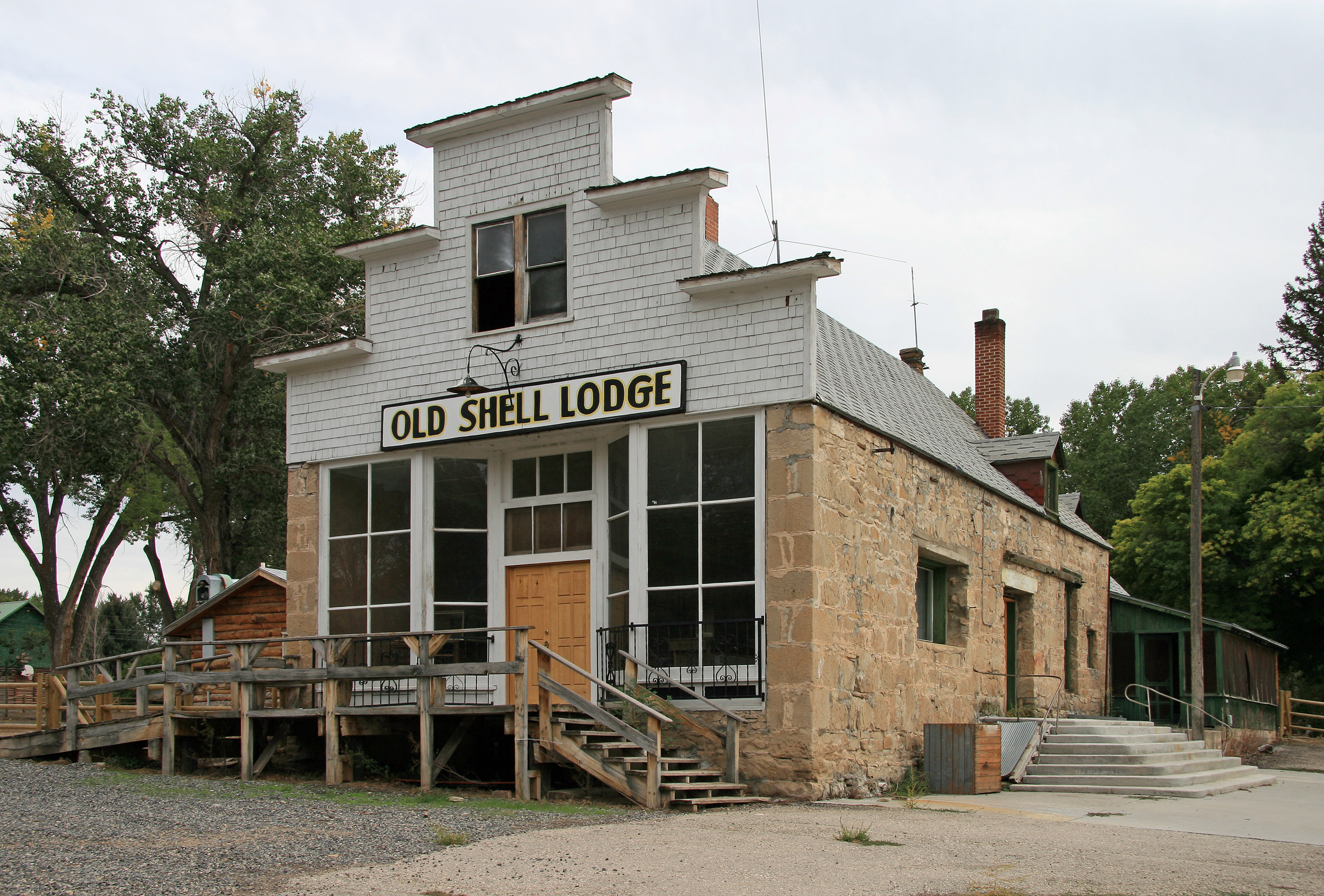
Old Shell Lodge in 2007

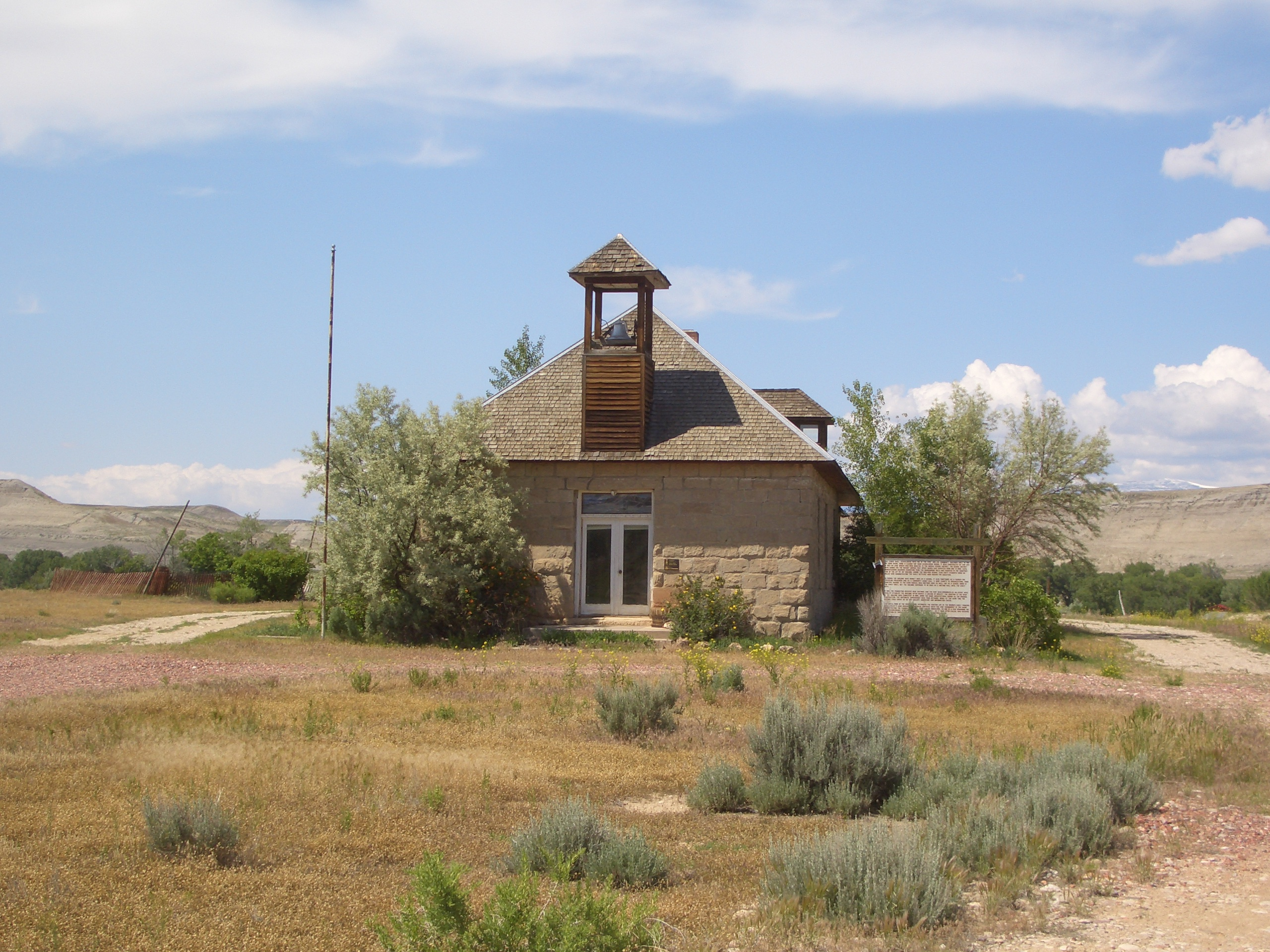
Lower Shell Schoolhouse

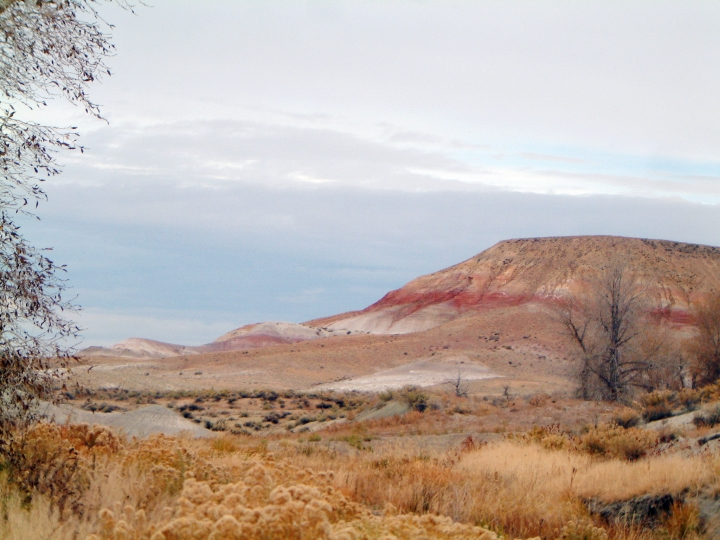
Brightly colored strata in the upper part of the Cloverly Formation near Shell.
