= List of bridges on the National Register of Historic Places in North Dakota =

This is a list of bridges and tunnels on the National Register of Historic Places in the U.S. state of North Dakota.

Name	Image	Built	Listed	Location	County	Type
Beaver Creek Bridge		1913	1997-02-27	Finley; 47°35′16″N 97°33′28″W	Steele	Pratt through truss
Caledonia Bridge		1895	1997-02-27	Caledonia; 47°27′26″N 96°53′3″W	Traill	Pratt through truss
Cedar Creek Bridge		1908	1997-02-27	Haynes; 46°3′2″N 102°13′37″W	Adams	Pratt through truss
Colton's Crossing Bridge		1907	1997-02-27	Lisbon; 46°23′2″N 97°37′58″W	Ransom	Pratt through truss
Crystal Bridge		1927	1997-05-30	Crystal; 48°35′49″N 97°40′20″W	Pembina	Concrete T-beam bridge
Eastwood Park Bridge	Eastwood Park Bridge	1927	1975-04-21	Minot; 48°14′10″N 101°17′3″W	Ward	Cantilever type
Elliott Bridge		1902	1997-02-27	Towner; 48°24′27″N 100°23′45″W	McHenry	Pratt through truss
Fairview Lift Bridge		1913	1997-03-14	Cartwright; 47°55′44″N 103°57′55″W	McKenzie	railroad lift bridge
Grace City Bridge		1925	1997-02-27	Grace City; 47°32′39″N 98°49′52″W	Foster	Pratt through truss
Great Northern Railway Underpass		1937	1997-02-27	Stanley; 48°19′11″N 102°23′24″W	Mountrail	concrete deck girder bridge
Knife River Bridge near Stanton		by 1898	2001-04-25	Stanton; 47°19′36″N 101°28′7″W	Mercer	Pratt through truss
Lisbon Bridge		1936	1997-02-27	Lisbon; 46°26′49″N 97°40′52″W	Ransom	steel cantilever bean bridge
Midland Continental Overpass		1936	1997-02-27	Jamestown; 46°56′9″N 98°32′55″W	Stutsman	steel cantilever beam bridge
Midway Bridge			1997-02-27	Johnstown; 48°7′50″N 97°30′50″W	Grand Forks	Warren Bedstead bridge
Nesheim Bridge		1904	1997-02-27	McVille; 47°44′15″N 98°13′6″W	Nelson	Pratt through truss
New Rockford Bridge		1904	1997-03-13	New Rockford; 47°41′8″N 99°8′5″W Closed to traffic	Eddy	Warren through truss bridge
Northwood Bridge		1906	1997-02-27	Northwood; 47°43′3″N 97°36′25″W	Grand Forks	Pratt pony truss
Norway Bridge		1912	1997-02-27	Mayville; 47°27′26″N 97°11′55″W	Traill	Pratt pony truss
Ost Valle Bridge	Ost Valle Bridge	1910	1997-02-27	Thompson; 47°47′18″N 96°58′57″W	Grand Forks	Pratt through truss
Romness Bridge		1912	1997-02-27	Cooperstown; 47°34′22″N 98°5′37″W	Griggs	Pratt through truss
Sorlie Memorial Bridge		1929	1999-07-19	Grand Forks; 47°55′37″N 97°1′40″W	Grand Forks	Parker through truss bridge
Viking Bridge		1885, 1915	1997-02-27	Portland; 47°31′2″N 97°23′21″W	Traill	Pratt through truss
West Antelope Bridge		1907	1997-02-27	Flora; 47°53′12″N 99°23′5″W	Benson	Pratt pony truss bridge
West Park Bridge		original 1924	1997-02-27	Valley City; 46°55′14″N 98°0′30″W	Barnes	concrete false arch bridge; replaced in 2007
Westgaard Bridge		1902	1997-02-27	Voltaire; 48°6′51″N 100°48′33″W	McHenry	Pratt pony through truss
Blanchard Bridge		1900	1997-02-27 removed 2009-3-25	Blanchard; 47°20′23″N 97°12′59″W	Traill	Pratt through truss
Goose River Bridge		1893	1997-02-27 removed 2009-3-25	Hillsboro; 47°26′41″N 96°55′15″W	Traill	Pratt through truss
Liberty Memorial Bridge	Liberty Memorial Bridge	1920, 1922	1997-03-11 removed 2009-3-25	Bismarck; 46°48′28″N 100°49′21″W	Burleigh	Warren-Turner through truss
Porter Elliott Bridge		1902	1997-02-27 removed 2009-3-25	Hillsboro; 47°26′10″N 96°56′32″W	Traill	Warren through truss
Portland Park Bridge		1919	removed 2004-09-23	Portland	Traill	steel through girder
Rainbow Arch Bridge	Rainbow Arch Bridge	1925	removed 2004-09-23	Valley City	Barnes	Marsh Rainbow Arch
