= Sheyenne River Bridge =

Sheyenne River Bridge may refer to:

- Colton's Crossing Bridge, near Lisbon, North Dakota, NRHP-listed
- Hi-Line Railroad Bridge, Valley City, North Dakota, NRHP-listed
- Lisbon Bridge, Lisbon, North Dakota, NRHP-listed
- Nesheim Bridge, McVille, North Dakota, NRHP-listed
- Rainbow Arch Bridge, Valley City, North Dakota, formerly NRHP-listed
- Romness Bridge, near Cooperstown, North Dakota, NRHP-listed
- West Antelope Bridge, near Flora, North Dakota, NRHP-listed
- West Park Bridge, near Valley City, NRHP-listed

== See also ==
- Sheyenne River, North Dakota, USA; a river that is a tributary to the Red River
- DSD Bridge over Cheyenne River, Niobrara County, Wyoming, USA
- Sheyenne (disambiguation)
