= Goose River Bridge =

Goose River Bridge may refer to:

- Caledonia Bridge (Caledonia, North Dakota) or Goose River Bridge, a bridge in Traill County, North Dakota
- Goose River Bridge (Hillsboro, North Dakota), a former bridge in Traill County, North Dakota
- Northwood Bridge or Goose River Bridge, a bridge in Grand Forks County, North Dakota
- Porter Elliott Bridge or Goose River Bridge, a bridge near Hillsboro, North Dakota
- Portland Park Bridge or South Branch Goose River Bridge, a bridge near Portland, North Dakota
- Viking Bridge or Goose River Bridge, a bridge near Portland, North Dakota

== See also ==
- Goose River (disambiguation)
