= Goose River =

Goose River may refer to:

in The Bahamas

- Goose River (Bahamas)

in Canada

- Goose River (Manitoba–Saskatchewan), a river mostly in Manitoba with a mouth in Saskatchewan
- Prince Edward Island
  - Goose River, Prince Edward Island, a community in Kings County
  - Goose River (Kings County), a short river in Kings County in the community of the same name

in Russia

- Gus River, (Russian: Гусь, lit. Goose), a river in Vladimir and Ryazan Oblasts

in the United States

- Maine
  - Goose River (Belfast Bay), a river in Waldo County
  - Goose River (Medomak River), a river in Lincoln and Knox Counties
  - Goose River (Rockport Harbor), a river in Knox County
- Goose River (North Dakota), a river in Grand Forks County and Traill County of North Dakota

== See also ==
- Goose River Bank, a bank in Mayville, North Dakota
- Goose River Bridge (Hillsboro, North Dakota), a bridge over the Goose River (North Dakota)
