= Sheyenne =

Sheyenne may refer to:

- Sheyenne, North Dakota, a city
- Sheyenne River, a river
- Sheyenne Lake, a lake in the Sheyenne Lake National Wildlife Refuge
- Ulmus americana 'Sheyenne', a cultivar

== See also ==
- Sheyenne River Bridge (disambiguation)
- Cheyenne (disambiguation)
