= Fargo Bridge & Iron Co. =

American bridge company

Fargo Bridge & Iron Co. was a bridge company based in North Dakota in the early part of the 20th century.

== History ==
It grew out of a partnership beginning in 1889 between Francis E. Dibley (1860-1910), who had previously been a representative of the Wisconsin Bridge and Iron Company, and W. H. Robinson from Mayville. In 1898, Dibley and W.H. Robinson formed the bridge-building partnership of Dibley and Robinson, and actively began soliciting county bridge contracts throughout eastern North Dakota. In 1901, Robinson left the company, and Dibley reorganized the firm into the Fargo Bridge and Iron Company.

It was the state's dominant bridge-building company in its day, and its works include many bridges that are now listed on the U.S. National Register of Historic Places.

== Works (attribution) include ==
- Beaver Creek Bridge, built 1913, across Beaver Creek, unnamed co. rd., approximately 13 miles (21 km) east and 4 miles (6.4 km) north of Finley, ND (Fargo Bridge & Iron Co.), NRHP-listed
- Crystal Bridge, Appleton Ave., over Cart Cr., Crystal, ND (Fargo Bridge & Iron Co.), NRHP-listed
- Elliott Bridge, Across the Souris River, unnamed co. rd., approximately 4 miles (6.4 km) north of Towner, Towner, ND (Fargo Bridge & Iron Co.), NRHP-listed
- Grace City Bridge, Across the James River, unnamed co. rd., 1 mile (1.6 km) south-west of Grace City, ND (Fargo Bridge & Iron Co.), NRHP-listed
- Nesheim Bridge, Across the Sheyenne River, unnamed co. rd., approximately 2 miles (3.2 km) south-west of McVille, ND (Fargo Bridge & Iron Co.), NRHP-listed
- New Rockford Bridge, Across the James River, unnamed co. rd., jct. with ND 15, New Rockford, ND (Fargo Bridge & Iron Co.), NRHP-listed
- Northwood Bridge, Across the Goose River, unnamed co. rd., 1.5 miles (2.4 km) south-west of Northwood, ND (Fargo Bridge & Iron Co.), NRHP-listed
- Porter Elliott Bridge, Across the Sheyenne River, unnamed co. rd., approximately 5 miles (8.0 km) east and 1 mile (1.6 km) north of Hillsboro, ND (Fargo Bridge & Iron Co.), NRHP-listed
- West Antelope Bridge, Across the Sheyenne River, unnamed co. rd., approximately 30 miles (48 km) south-east of jct. of ND 30 and US 2, Flora, ND (Fargo Bridge & Iron Co.), NRHP-listed
- Westgaard Bridge, Across the Sheyenne River, unnamed co. rd., approximately 6 miles (9.7 km) north and 1 mile (1.6 km) east of Voltaire, ND (Fargo Bridge & Iron Co.), NRHP-listed
