= Lisbon Bridge =

Lisbon Bridge may refer to:

Bridges in the United States:

- Lisbon Bridge (Lisbon, North Dakota), over the Sheyenne River in Lisbon, North Dakota

Bridges in Lisbon, Portugal:

- 25 de Abril Bridge, a suspension bridge on the Tejo River, connecting Lisbon to the municipality of Almada
- Vasco da Gama Bridge, a cable-stayed bridge over the Tagus River in Parque das Nações
