= Midway Bridge =

Midway Bridge may refer to:

in the United States

(by state)

- Illinois River Bridge (Siloam Springs, Arkansas), a historic bridge also known as Midway Bridge
- Midway Bridge (Truckee, California), one of many bridges in the United States
- Midway Bridge (Johnstown, North Dakota), a historic bridge listed on the National Register of Historic Places, in Grand Forks County
- Midway Bridge (Washington, Pennsylvania), a Pennsylvania Dept. of Transportation bridge near Washington, Pennsylvania, one of many bridges in the United States
