= Crystal Bridge =

Crystal Bridge may refer to:

- Crystal Bridge (Crystal, North Dakota)
- Crystal Bridges Museum of American Art, Bentonville, Arkansas
- Crystal Bridge, a band, singer, musician or musical ensemble
- Crystal Bridge Tropical Conservatory, part of the Myriad Botanical Gardens, Oklahoma City, Oklahoma
