= Ball Road-Little Salt Creek Bridge =

- U.S. National Register of Historic Places
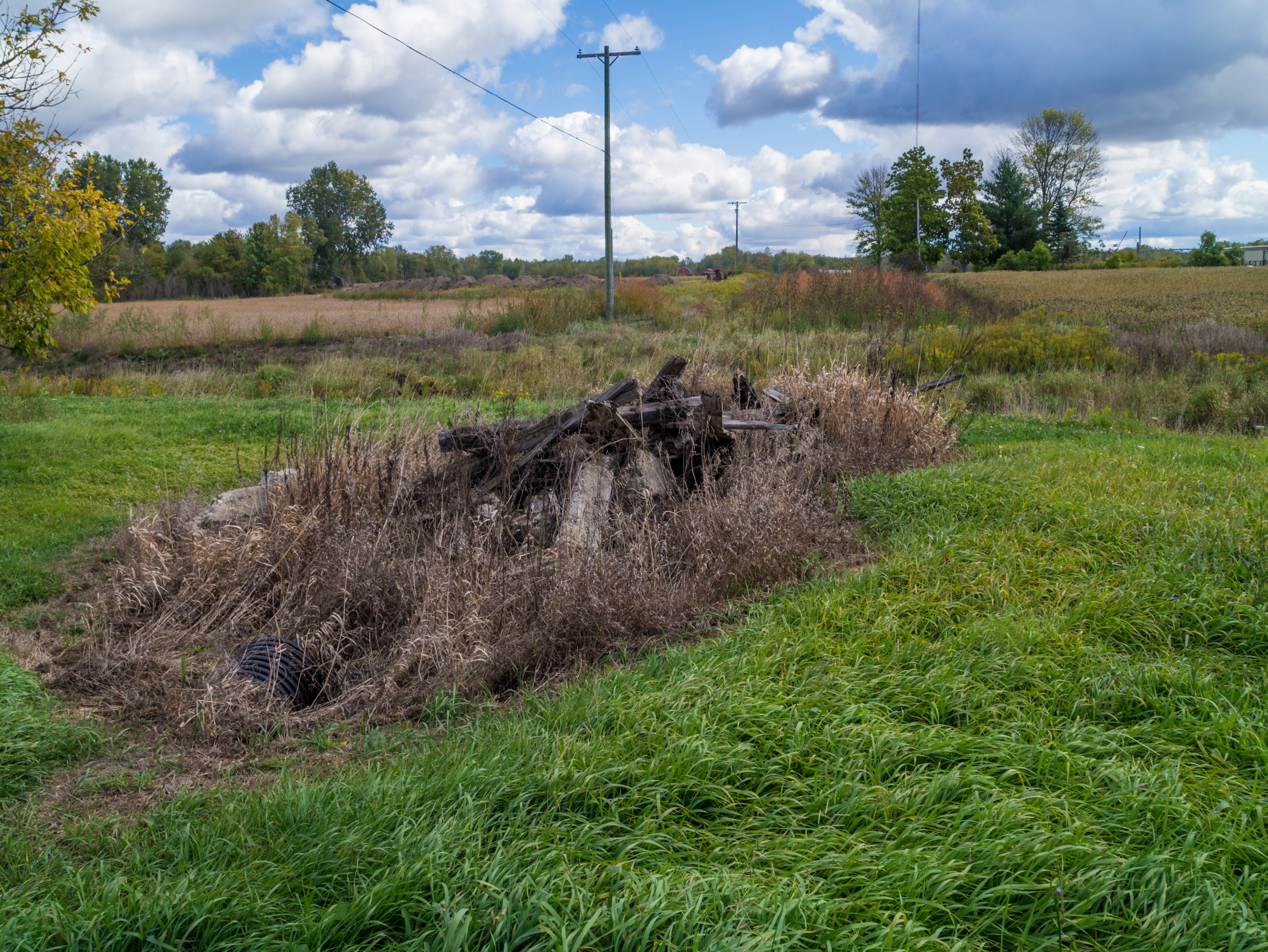
- Site of former Ball Road-Little Salt Creek Bridge
- Interactive map
- Location: Ball Rd. over Little Salt Creek, Jasper Township, Michigan
- Coordinates: 43°31′00″N 84°33′23″W
- Area: less than one acre
- Built: 1901
- Architectural style: Pratt truss-leg bedstead
- Demolished: c. 2006
- MPS: Highway Bridges of Michigan MPS
- NRHP reference No.: 99001533
- Added to NRHP: December 17, 1999

The Ball Road-Little Salt Creek Bridge, also known as simply the Ball Road Bridge, was a bridge carrying Ball Road over Little Salt Creek in Jasper Township, Michigan. It was listed on the National Register of Historic Places in 1999. The bridge was later demolished.

== History ==
This bridge was constructed in 1901. By the 1990s it was closed to traffic. The Midland County Drain Commission demolished the bridge some time after 2006. No replacement span was constructed. At the time of demolition, it was the only surviving bedstead truss type of bridge in Michigan, a design that was used in the late 1800s.

== Description ==
The Ball Road-Little Salt Creek Bridge was a single-span steel pin-connected, Pratt bedstead truss bridge. The bridge spanned 40 feet and was 13 feet wide. The upper chord members were constructed from two channels with cover and batten plates, the upright end posts were constructed from two channels with lacing, and the lower chord members were constructed from two angles with batten plates. Verticals were constructed from four angles with double lacing and the diagonals were constructed from two punched rectangular eyebars. The floor was supported with I-beams hung from the lower chord pins by U-bolts. Steel stringers atop the I-beams supported a timber deck. The truss was supported at each corners with steel truss legs sitting on concrete back and wingwalls.
