= Norway Bridge =

- U.S. National Register of Historic Places
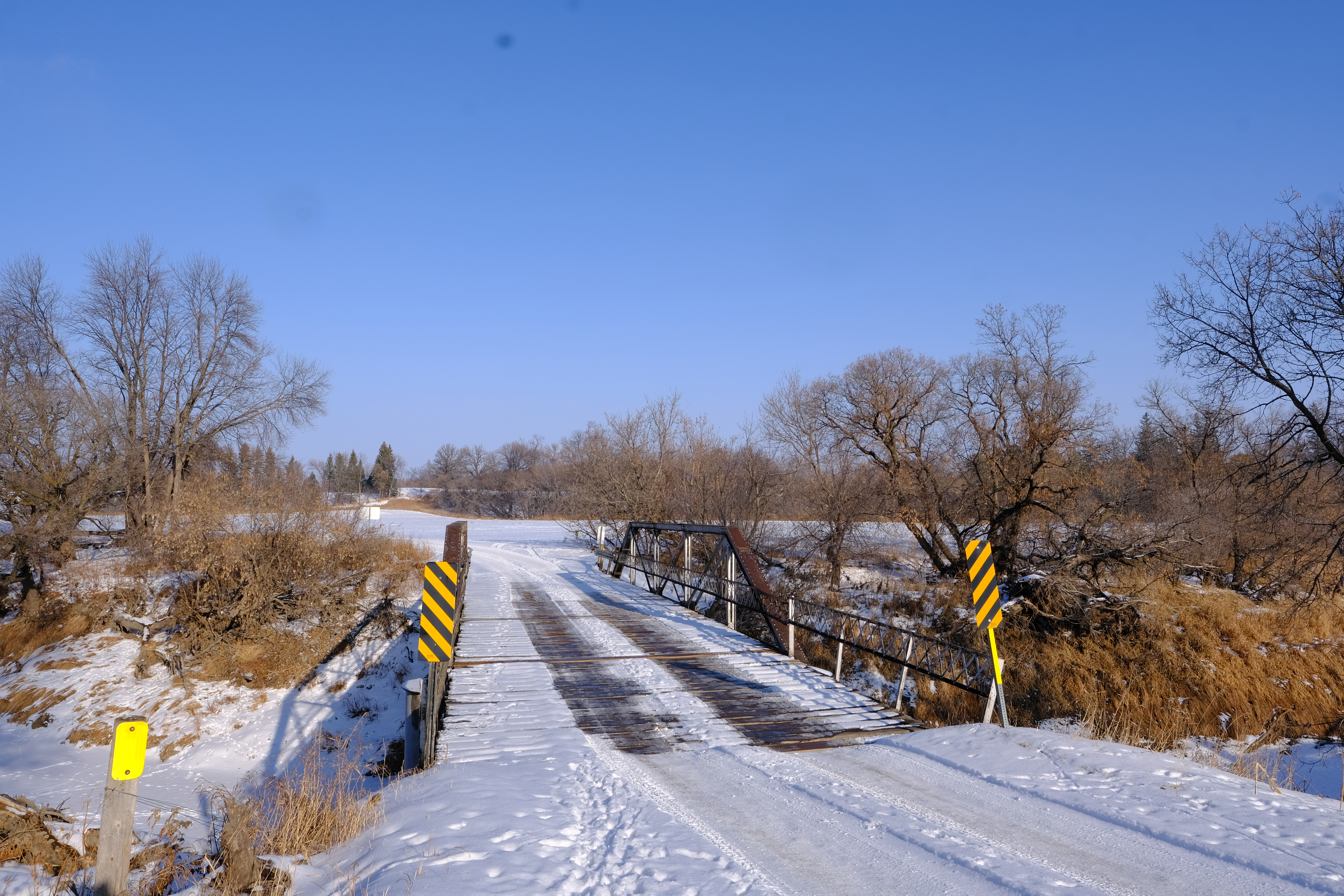

- Location within North Dakota Location within the United States
- Nearest city: Mayville, North Dakota
- Coordinates: 47°27′26″N 97°11′55″W
- Area: less than one acre
- Built: 1912
- Built by: Jardine & Anderson
- Architectural style: Pratt pony truss
- MPS: Historic Roadway Bridges of North Dakota MPS
- NRHP reference No.: 97000192
- Added to NRHP: February 27, 1997

The Norway Bridge near Mayville, North Dakota is a Pratt pony truss structure that was built in 1912 over the Goose River. It was listed on the National Register of Historic Places in 1997.
