= Sorlie Memorial Bridge =

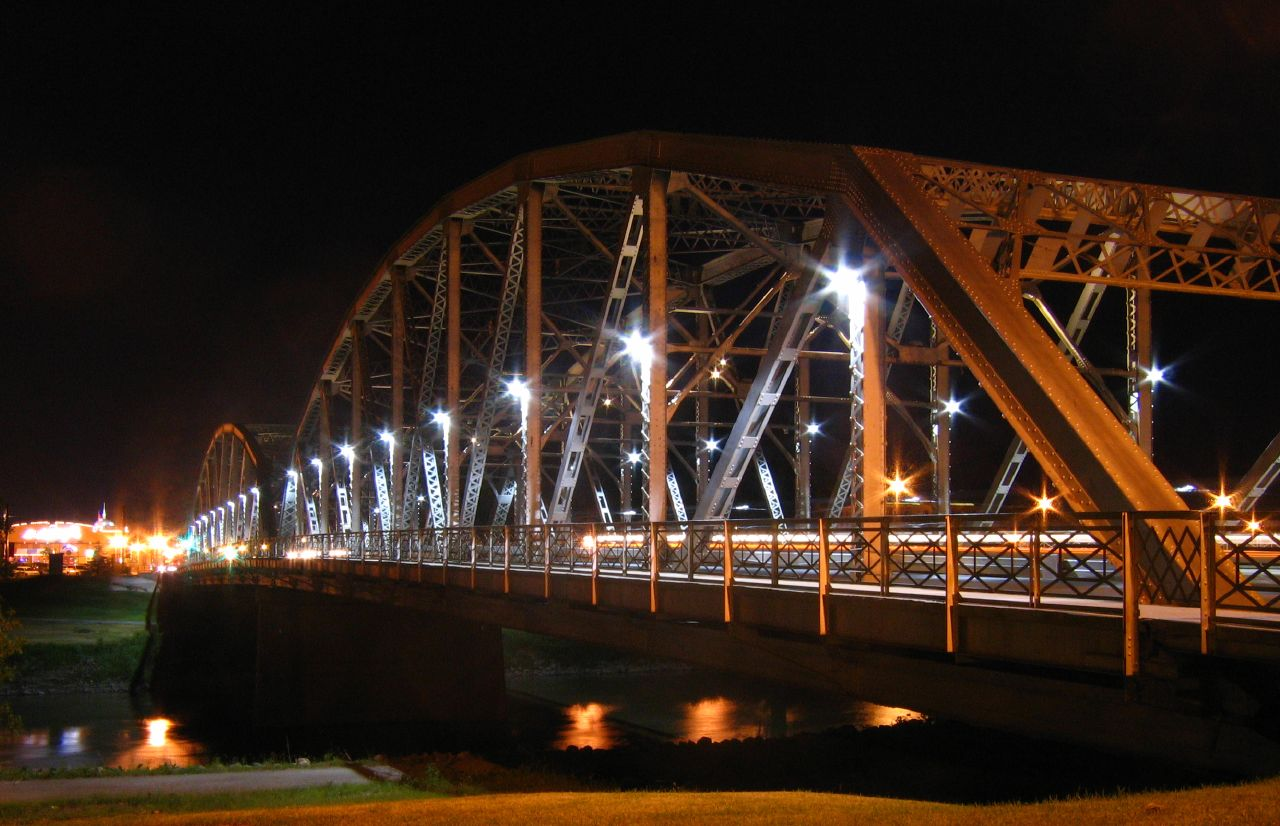
- Sorlie Memorial Bridge
- Coordinates: 47°55′36.83″N 97°01′40.4″W
- Carries: U.S. Route 2 Business
- Crosses: Red River of the North
- Locale: Grand Forks, ND
- ID number: 0002911409

Characteristics
- Design: Steel Truss - Thru
- Total length: 184.4 metres (605 ft)
- Width: 12.6 metres (41 ft)
- Longest span: 79.9 metres (262 ft)
- Clearance above: 5.09 metres (16.7 ft)

History
- Opened: 1929
- Rebuilt: 1986

Statistics
- Daily traffic: 12600
- Sorlie Memorial Bridge
- U.S. National Register of Historic Places
- Location within North Dakota Location within the United States
- Location: E end of Demers Ave., Grand Forks, North Dakota and East Grand Forks, Minnesota
- Area: less than 1 acre (0.40 ha)
- Built: 1929
- Architect: Minneapolis Bridge Co.
- Architectural style: Parker through truss bridge
- MPS: Historic Roadway Bridges of North Dakota MPS
- NRHP reference No.: 99000844
- Added to NRHP: July 19, 1999

Location
- Interactive map of Sorlie Memorial Bridge

The Sorlie Memorial Bridge, also known as the Red River Bridge, was constructed in 1929 by the Minneapolis Bridge Company to connect the cities of Grand Forks, North Dakota and East Grand Forks, Minnesota. It was placed on the National Register of Historic Places in 1999.

The Sorlie Memorial Bridge replaced a swing bridge on the same site that was built in 1889. It is a Parker through truss bridge with two truss spans and rides on rails to accommodate the ever-changing banks of the Red River of the North. The Sorlie Memorial Bridge was named for North Dakota's 14th governor, Arthur G. Sorlie. Plaques on either end identify Sorlie as "a true friend of better roads and bridges." At the time, the bridge was the only vehicular crossing in the area, and was important for carrying U.S. Route 2, a transcontinental route. It is the oldest documented Parker truss design in the state, and its two spans of 283 feet (86 m) are the longest riveted Parker through trusses in the state.

== See also ==
- List of bridges on the National Register of Historic Places in North Dakota
- List of bridges on the National Register of Historic Places in Minnesota
- National Register of Historic Places listings in Grand Forks County, North Dakota
- National Register of Historic Places listings in Polk County, Minnesota
