= Ulmus americana 'Great Plains' =

Elm cultivar

- Species: Ulmus americana
- Cultivar: 'Great Plains'
- Origin: North Dakota

The American elm cultivar Ulmus americana 'Great Plains' was a clone raised by nurseryman Wedge of the Oscar H. Will & Co. Nurseries, Bismarck, North Dakota, in the 1930s and first listed in the company's 1942 catalogue as 'Great Plains American elm'.

The cultivar did not appear in Green's 1964 or Santamour's 1995 cultivar lists.

== Description ==
Said to be "an unusually handsome form of American elm". A photograph of a narrow-habited wild elm captioned 'N. D. Native American elm' that had first appeared in Will's catalogues in the 1930s, and a second of the same specimen, with figure, alongside the 'Great Plains' information, presumably shows the parent tree. North Dakota is at the western edge of the natural range of Ulmus americana.

== Pests and diseases ==
No specific information. Dutch elm disease was first detected in North Dakota in 1969 and had spread to most of the state by 1975.

== Cultivation ==
The clone was propagated by grafting and recommended for boulevard planting. It is unlikely that the tree remains in cultivation in North America.

== Etymology ==
The name marked the nursery's association with the Mandan Indians of the Great Plains, who featured on the covers of its mid-twentieth century annual catalogues, in artwork by Clell Gannon (1900-1970), painter, poet and historian of North Dakota. A second U. americana cultivar associated with the North Dakota Indians, 'Sheyenne', was selected in the state before 1941.
