= Johnstown Township, North Dakota =

- Township
- Location within North Dakota
- Coordinates: 48°09′05″N 97°26′54″W
- Country: United States
- State: North Dakota
- County: Grand Forks
- Named for: Johnstown

Area
  - Total: 36.20 sq mi (93.75 km^{2})
  - Land: 36.20 sq mi (93.75 km^{2})
  - Water: 0 sq mi (0.00 km^{2})
- Elevation: 863 ft (263 m)

Population (2020)
  - Total: 87
  - Density: 2.4/sq mi (0.93/km^{2})
- Time zone: UTC-6 (Central (CST))
  - Summer (DST): UTC-5 (CDT)
- ZIP codes: 58233 (Forest River); 58235 (Gilby); 58261 Minto)
- Area code: 701
- FIPS code: 38-40940
- GNIS feature ID: 1036624

Johnstown Township is a township on the northern edge of Grand Forks County, North Dakota, United States. The population was 87 at the 2020 census.

== Geography ==
Johnstown Township has a total area of 36.199 square miles (93.75 km^{2}), all land.

The unincorporated community of Johnstown is located within the township.

== Demographics ==
As of the 2023 American Community Survey, there were an estimated 28 households with a margin of error of 13.
