= Grace City Bridge =

- U.S. National Register of Historic Places
- Location within North Dakota Location within the United States
- Nearest city: Grace City, North Dakota
- Coordinates: 47°32′39″N 98°49′52″W
- Area: less than one acre
- Built: 1925
- Built by: Fargo Bridge & Iron Co.
- Architectural style: Pratt through truss
- MPS: Historic Roadway Bridges of North Dakota MPS
- NRHP reference No.: 97000174
- Added to NRHP: February 27, 1997

The Grace City Bridge near Grace City, North Dakota, also known as the James River Bridge, is a Pratt through truss structure that was built in 1925 over the James River. It was listed on the National Register of Historic Places in 1997.
