= West Antelope Bridge =

- Coordinates: 47°53′12″N 99°23′5″W
- Crosses: Sheyenne River
- ID number: 000000003121340

Characteristics
- Design: Steel Truss - Thru
- Total length: 28 metres (92 ft)
- Width: 5.4 metres (18 ft)
- Longest span: 14.9 metres (49 ft)

History
- Opened: 1907

Statistics
- Daily traffic: 5
- West Antelope Bridge
- U.S. National Register of Historic Places
- Location within North Dakota Location within the United States
- Nearest city: Flora, North Dakota
- Area: less than one acre
- Built: 1907
- Built by: Fargo Bridge & Iron Co.
- Architectural style: Pratt pony truss bridge
- MPS: Historic Roadway Bridges of North Dakota MPS
- NRHP reference No.: 97000171
- Added to NRHP: February 27, 1997

Location
- Interactive map of West Antelope Bridge

The West Antelope Bridge near Flora, North Dakota is a pin-connected Pratt pony truss structure that was built in 1907. It was listed on the National Register of Historic Places in 1997.

The bridge is the oldest documented bridge in Benson County. County commissioners awarded an $1100 contract to Fargo Bridge and Iron Company in September 1907. Fargo Bridge and Iron built nearly all of the metal truss bridges in the county between 1900 and 1920. The bridge brings an unpaved, little-maintained county road over the Sheyenne River.

== See also ==
- West Park Bridge, also NRHP-listed over the Sheyenne
