= Viking Bridge =

Historic bridge in North Dakota

- U.S. National Register of Historic Places
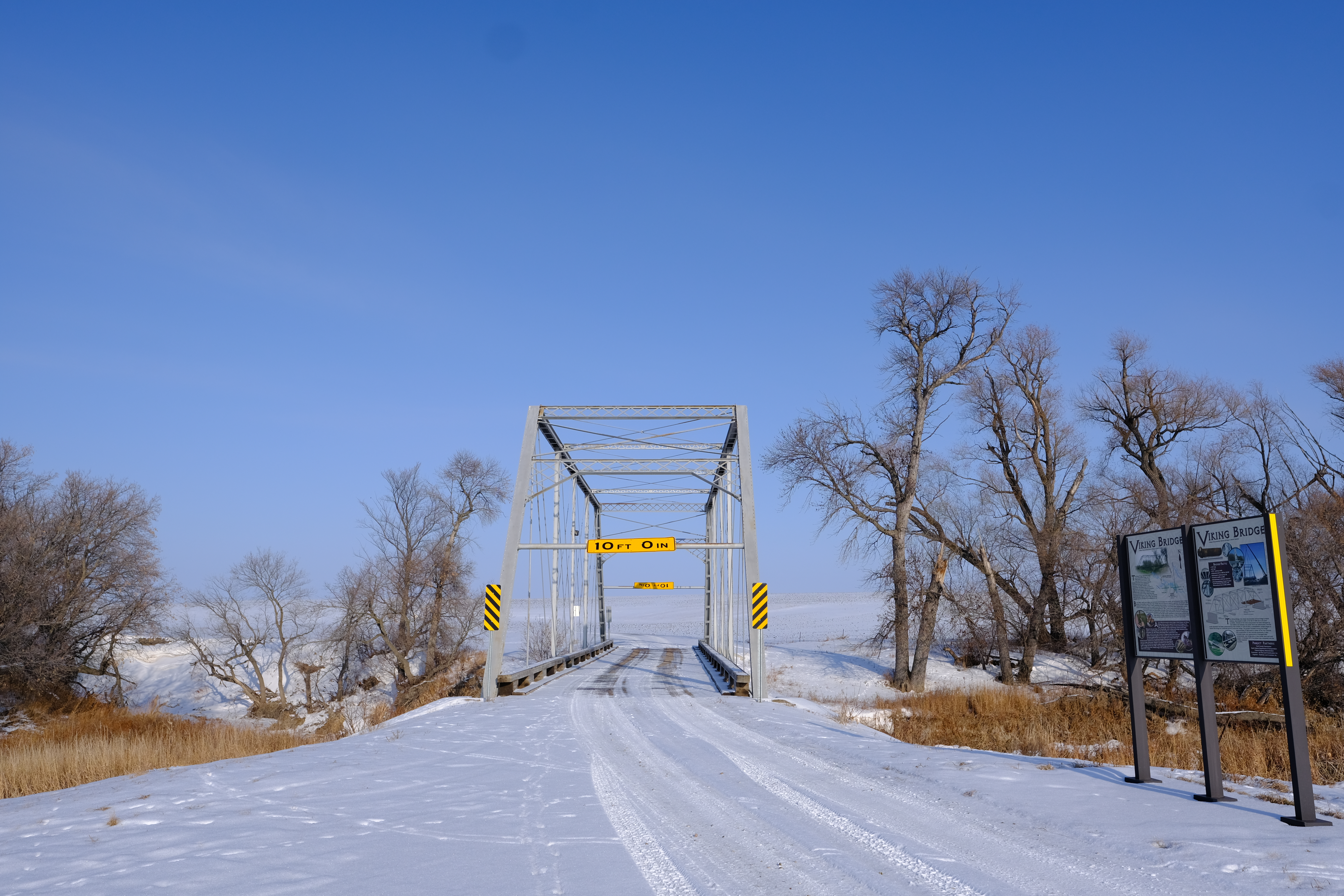

- Location within North Dakota Location within the United States
- Nearest city: Portland, North Dakota
- Coordinates: 47°31′2″N 97°23′21″W
- Area: less than one acre
- Built: 1885
- Architect: C.P. Jones
- Architectural style: Pratt through truss
- MPS: Historic Roadway Bridges of North Dakota MPS
- NRHP reference No.: 97000190
- Added to NRHP: February 27, 1997

The Viking Bridge, also known as Goose River Bridge, near Portland, North Dakota, was built in 1885 over the Goose River. It was listed on the National Register of Historic Places in 1997.

The bridge is the oldest documented bridge in the state. It is also historically significant "for its association with C.P. Jones, a nineteenth-century bridge fabricator important for introducing iron and steel bridge technologies to North Dakota."
