= Portland Park Bridge =

- Formerly listed on the U.S. National Register of Historic Places
- Nearest city: Portland, North Dakota
- Built: 1919
- Built by: Anderson, M.S.
- Architectural style: Steel through girder, Other
- MPS: Historic Roadway Bridges of North Dakota MPS
- NRHP reference No.: 97000191
- Removed from NRHP: September 23, 2004

The Portland Park Bridge, also known as South Branch Goose River Bridge, near Portland, North Dakota is a Pratt through truss structure that was built in 1919 over the south branch of the Goose River. It was listed on the National Register of Historic Places. It was removed from the National Register in 2004.
