= Midway Bridge (Johnstown, North Dakota) =

- U.S. National Register of Historic Places
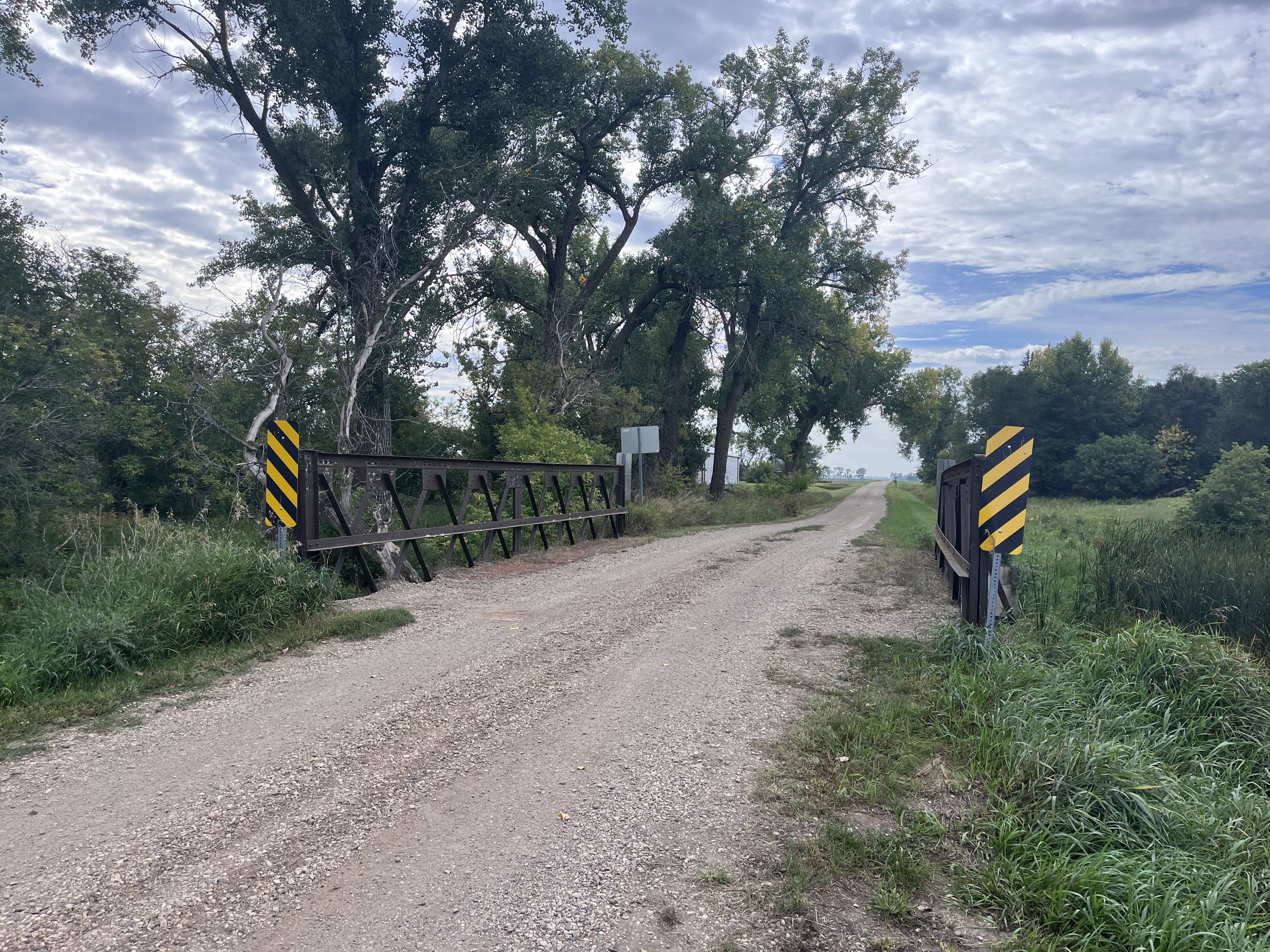
- Midway Bridge in 2023

- Location within North Dakota Location within the United States
- Location: Across an unnamed creek, unnamed county road, approximately 1.5 mi. S and 2 mi. W of Johnstown, North Dakota
- Coordinates: 48°7′50″N 97°30′50″W
- Built: c. 1920s
- Architectural style: Warren Bedstead truss bridge
- MPS: Historic Roadway Bridges of North Dakota MPS
- NRHP reference No.: 97000176
- Added to NRHP: February 27, 1997

Midway Bridge near Johnstown, North Dakota is the only bedstead bridge known to have been built in North Dakota. It appears to have been built locally, not as part of a state or county program, during the 1920-1930 period. Also known as Bedstead Bridge, it is a Warren Bedstead-type truss bridge.
