= Porter Elliott Bridge =

- Formerly listed on the U.S. National Register of Historic Places
- Location within North Dakota Location within the United States
- Nearest city: Hillsboro, North Dakota
- Area: less than one acre
- Built: 1902
- Built by: Fargo Bridge & Iron Co.
- Architectural style: Warren through truss
- MPS: Historic Roadway Bridges of North Dakota MPS
- NRHP reference No.: 97000193

Significant dates
- Added to NRHP: March 11, 1997
- Removed from NRHP: March 25, 2009

The Porter Elliott Bridge, also known as Goose River Bridge, near Hillsboro, North Dakota is a Warren through truss structure that was built in 1902 over the Goose River. It was previously listed on the National Register of Historic Places, but was removed in 2009.
