= Hi-Line Railroad Bridge =

Railroad bridge in North Dakota

Coordinates: 46°56′20″N 97°59′41″W

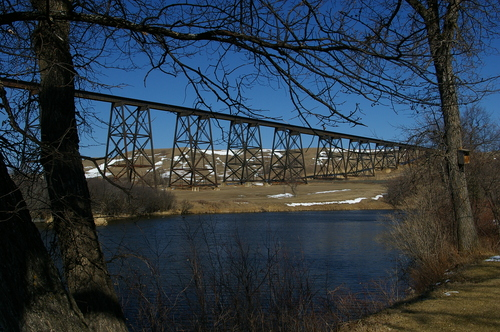
Hi-Line Railroad Bridge as seen from Chautauqua Park, Valley City

Originally called the High Bridge, the Hi-Line Bridge is a historic railroad bridge located over the Sheyenne River in Valley City, North Dakota. The bridge is 3,860 feet (1,180 m) long and 162 feet (49 m) above the river. Construction work began on July 5, 1906, and it was ready for service on May 8, 1908. At the time it was the longest bridge for its height in the world. It currently remains one of the longest and highest single track railroad viaducts in the United States, and was designated as a National Historic Civil Engineering Landmark by the American Society of Civil Engineers in 2005.

The Northern Pacific Railroad designed and built the bridge to avoid the steep grades into and out of the Sheyenne River valley. At one time, this was a main link in the railroad's coast-to-coast system and was important during both World Wars. To prevent sabotage during the wars, it was guarded by soldiers. The bridge is still used today by freight trains in the BNSF Railway system.

The 61 spans of the bridge are supported on 30 steel towers, each of which is 45 feet long at the top. The distance between towers at their tops is either 60, 75, or, for three of the spans, 101 feet. Two of these long spans are above the Sheyenne River and the third crosses over tracks of the former Soo Line Railroad, now part of the Canadian Pacific Railway. Each of the steel towers is supported on four concrete foundation piers measuring 6 feet square at their tops, and expanding to 14 to 18 feet square at their bases, depending on subsurface conditions. Approximately one million rivets were used in construction of the bridge.

Hi-Line Railroad Bridge
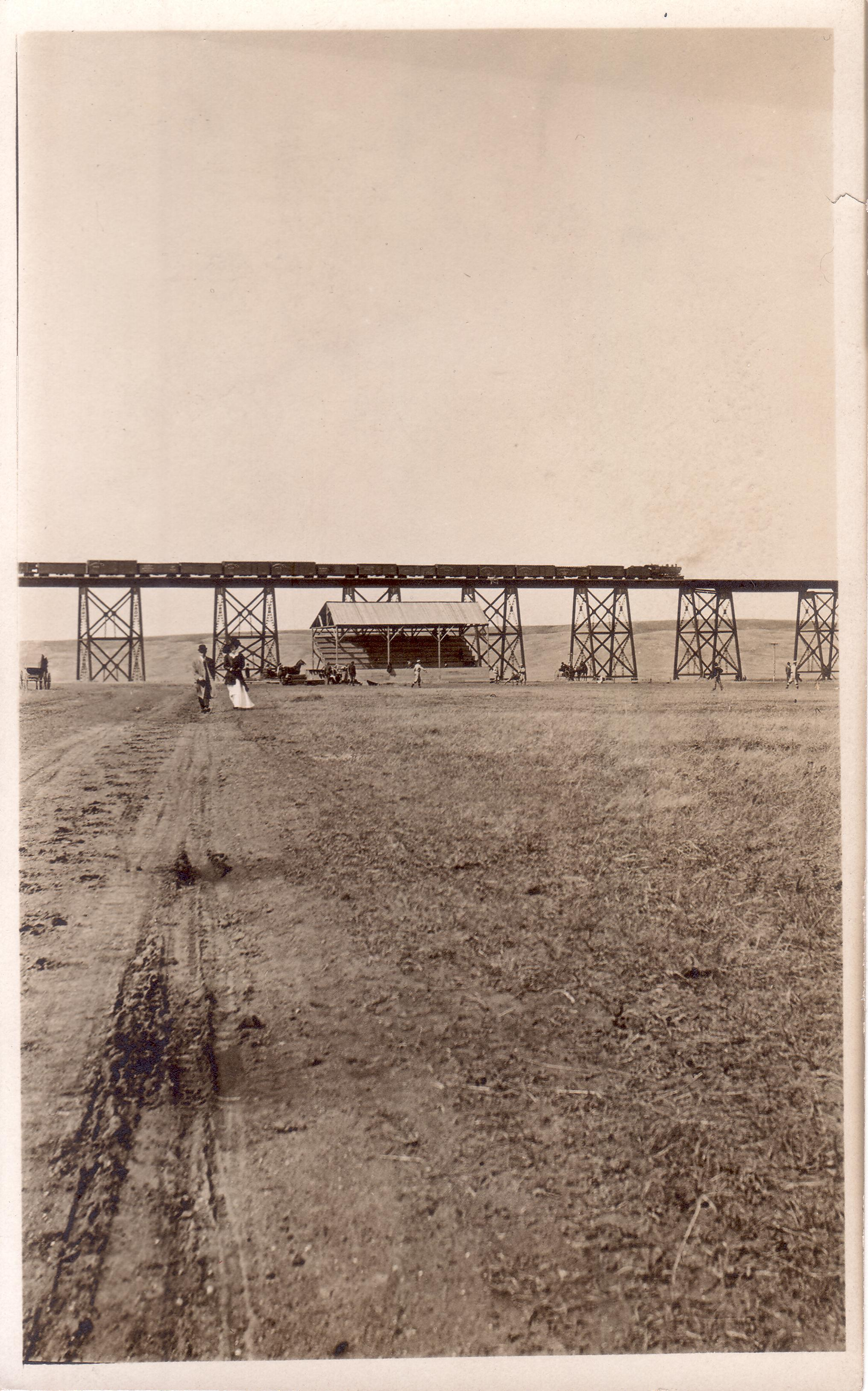
The road north to the baseball diamond near the High Bridge, 1908

The High Bridge under construction, 1907
