= Ost Valle Bridge =

- U.S. National Register of Historic Places
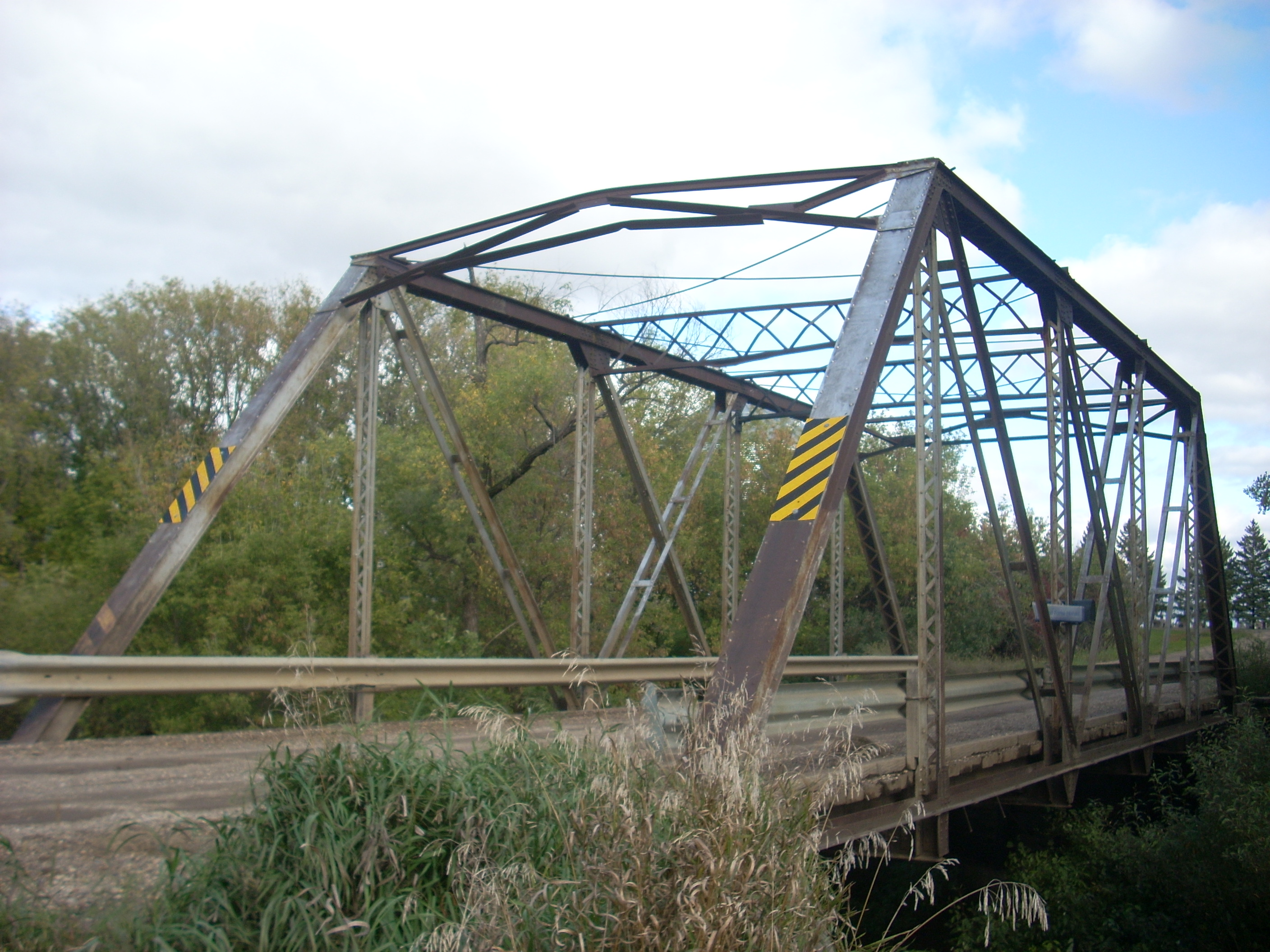
- Bridge in 2009

- Location within North Dakota Location within the United States
- Location: Across an unnamed tributary of the Red River, unnamed co. rd., approximately 6 mi. E and 1 mi. N of Thompson, Thompson, North Dakota
- Coordinates: 47°47′17.56392″N 96°58′58.53828″W
- Area: less than 1 acre (0.40 ha)
- Built: 1910
- Architect: Jardine & Anderson
- Architectural style: Pratt through truss
- MPS: Historic Roadway Bridges of North Dakota MPS
- NRHP reference No.: 97000178
- Added to NRHP: February 27, 1997

The Ost Valle Bridge is a bridge near Thompson, North Dakota that was listed on the National Register of Historic Places in 1997. It crosses an unnamed tributary of the Red River, about one mile west of the Red River itself. It is "one of the two oldest documented bridges in Grand Forks County that were built by long-term county bridge builder, the Jardine & Anderson".

It was probably built in 1910, based on examining county records.

It includes Pratt through truss design/architecture.

The property was covered in a study of Historic Roadway Bridges of North Dakota.
