= Johnstown, North Dakota =

- Unincorporated community
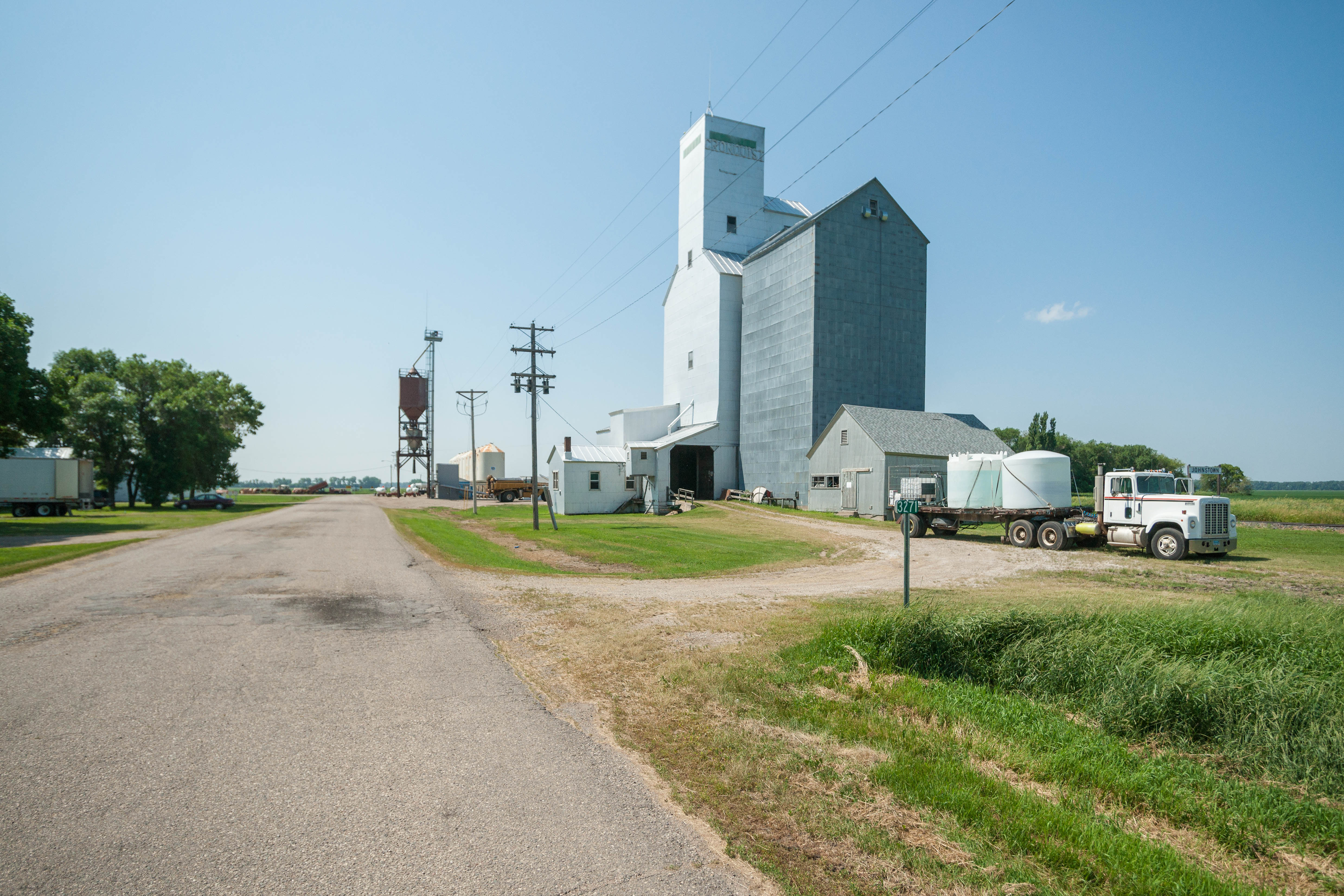

- Location within the state of North Dakota Johnstown (the United States)
- Coordinates: 48°08′39″N 97°28′12″W
- Country: United States
- State: North Dakota
- County: Grand Forks
- Township: Johnstown
- Elevation: 873 ft (266 m)
- Time zone: UTC-6 (Central (CST))
  - Summer (DST): UTC-5 (CDT)
- ZIP codes: 58235
- Area code: 701
- GNIS feature ID: 1029689

Johnstown is an unincorporated community in Grand Forks County, North Dakota, United States. It is the nearest community to the Midway Bridge, which is listed on the National Register of Historic Places.

Johnstown had a post office from 1880 to 1964
