= Ulmus americana 'Sheyenne' =

Elm cultivar

- Species: Ulmus americana
- Cultivar: 'Sheyenne'
- Origin: Northwest Nursery Company, Valley City, North Dakota

The American elm cultivar Ulmus americana 'Sheyenne' was raised by the Northwest Nursery Company of Valley City, North Dakota, before 1941, from a local elm in nearby Chautauqua Park.

'Sheyenne' is not regarded as a valid cultivar by some authorities.

== Description ==
Northwest Nursery described 'Sheyenne' as "an unusually fast growing, upright tree of great beauty" with "a fine spreading head and large dark green leaves". It reportedly made as large a tree in 10 years as the average American elm in 15. The Plumfield Nursery later called it "somewhat vase-shaped".

== Cultivation ==
'Sheyenne' was propagated by grafting. Northwest Nursery considered it "an ideal tree for street and lawn planting". It was also marketed from 1957 by the Plumfield Nursery, Fremont, Nebraska, which ceased trading circa 1980. It is unlikely the tree remains in cultivation in North America or beyond.

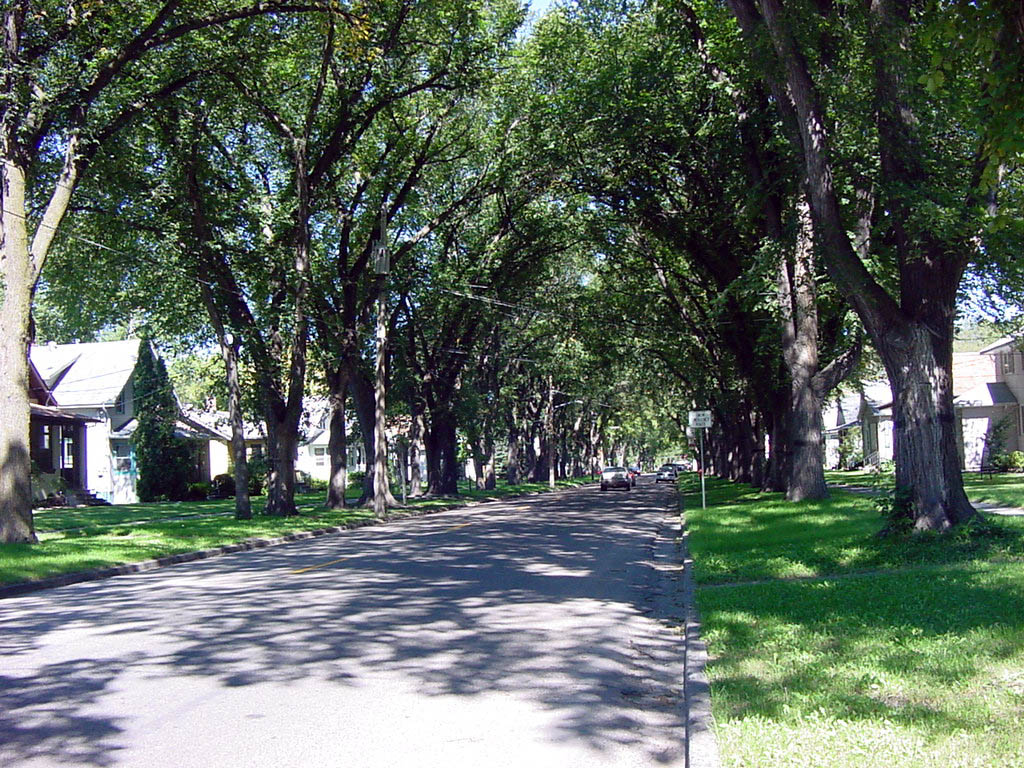
Elm avenue planted mid-twentieth century, Fargo, North Dakota (2005)

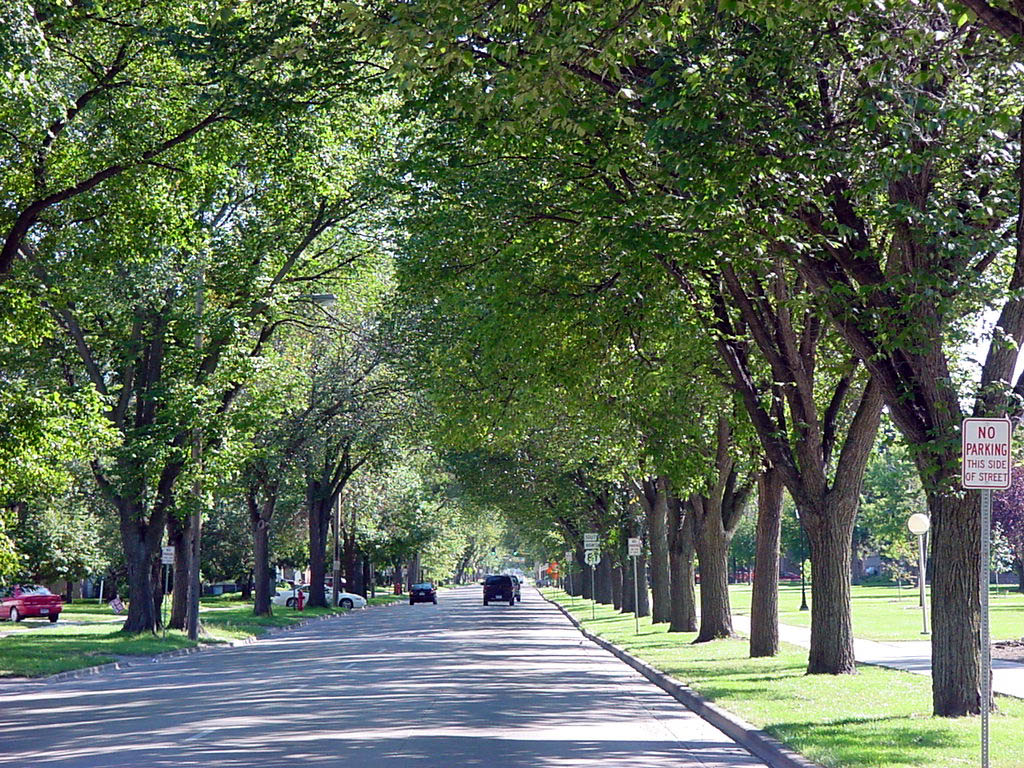
Elms in University Avenue, planted mid-twentieth century, Fargo, North Dakota (2005)

== Pests and diseases ==
No specific information. Dutch elm disease was first detected in North Dakota in 1969 and had spread to most of the State by 1975.

== Etymology ==
The tree was named for the town of Sheyenne in North Dakota, itself named for the Great Plains tribe of Cheyenne. A second cultivar called 'Great Plains', cloned from a wild tree in that state, was released by the Oscar H. Wills nursery of Bismarck, North Dakota in 1942. North Dakota is at the western edge of the natural range of Ulmus americana.
