= Beaver Creek Bridge (Finley, North Dakota) =

- Coordinates: 47°35′16″N 97°33′28″W
- Carries: County highway
- Crosses: Beaver Creek
- Owner: Steele County
- Maintained by: Steele County
- ID number: 000000046120060

Characteristics
- Design: Steel Truss - Thru
- Total length: 14 metres (46 ft)
- Width: 5.5 metres (18 ft)
- Longest span: 13.4 metres (44 ft)

History
- Opened: 1913
- Rebuilt: 0

Statistics
- Daily traffic: 10
- Beaver Creek Bridge
- U.S. National Register of Historic Places
- Location within North Dakota Location within the United States
- Nearest city: Finley, North Dakota
- Area: less than one acre
- Built: 1913
- Built by: Fargo Bridge & Iron Co.
- Architectural style: Pratt through truss
- MPS: Historic Roadway Bridges of North Dakota MPS
- NRHP reference No.: 97000183
- Added to NRHP: February 27, 1997

Location
- Interactive map of Beaver Creek Bridge

The Beaver Creek Bridge near Finley, North Dakota, also known as Newburgh Bridge, is a Pratt through truss bridge that was built in 1913. It is a pinned Pratt pony truss bridge and is "the oldest documented bridge in Steele County constructed by a long-term county bridge builder, the Fargo Bridge and Iron Company. Fargo built bridges in Steele County in almost every year between 1904 and 1920."

It was listed on the National Register of Historic Places in 1997.

It is owned and maintained by Steele County.
