= New Rockford Bridge =

- Coordinates: 47°41′8″N 99°8′5″W
- Crosses: James River
- Locale: New Rockford, ND
- ID number: 000000014108120

Characteristics
- Design: Steel Truss - Thru
- Total length: 51.8 metres (170 ft)
- Width: 5.4 metres (18 ft)
- Longest span: 29.6 metres (97 ft)
- Clearance above: 4.29 metres (14.1 ft)

History
- Opened: 1904

Statistics
- Daily traffic: 50
- New Rockford Bridge
- U.S. National Register of Historic Places
- Location within North Dakota Location within the United States
- Nearest city: New Rockford, North Dakota
- Area: less than one acre
- Built: 1904
- Built by: Fargo Bridge & Iron Co.
- Architectural style: Warren through truss bridge
- MPS: Historic Roadway Bridges of North Dakota MPS
- NRHP reference No.: 97000173
- Added to NRHP: March 13, 1997

Location
- Interactive map of New Rockford Bridge

The New Rockford Bridge near New Rockford, North Dakota is a Warren truss bridge structure that was built in 1904 over the James River. It was built by Fargo Bridge & Iron Co. at a cost of $4396. It is the oldest documented metal truss bridge in Eddy County, and is unusual because most other metal bridges built in North Dakota were Pratt truss or riveted Parker truss designs. It was listed on the National Register of Historic Places in 1997.
