= Goose River, Prince Edward Island =

Goose River
- Location in Prince Edward Island
- Coordinates: 46°27′25″N 62°30′26″W
- Country: Canada
- Province: Prince Edward Island
- County: Kings
- Elevation: 36 m (118 ft)
- Time zone: UTC-4 (Atlantic Time Zone)
  - Summer (DST): UTC-3 (Atlantic Time Zone)
- Postal code: C0A 2A0
- Area codes: 902, 782

Goose River is an unincorporated place in Kings County, Prince Edward Island, Canada. It lies on the north shore of the province along Prince Edward Island Route 16 between Cable Head East to the southwest and Monticello to the northeast. Goose River is part of the township of Lot 42, in St Patrick's Parish, and thus is part of Lot 42 for Statistics Canada census data.

The Goose River, a short tributary of the Gulf of Saint Lawrence, is in the community.
