= Caledonia Bridge (Caledonia, North Dakota) =

- U.S. National Register of Historic Places
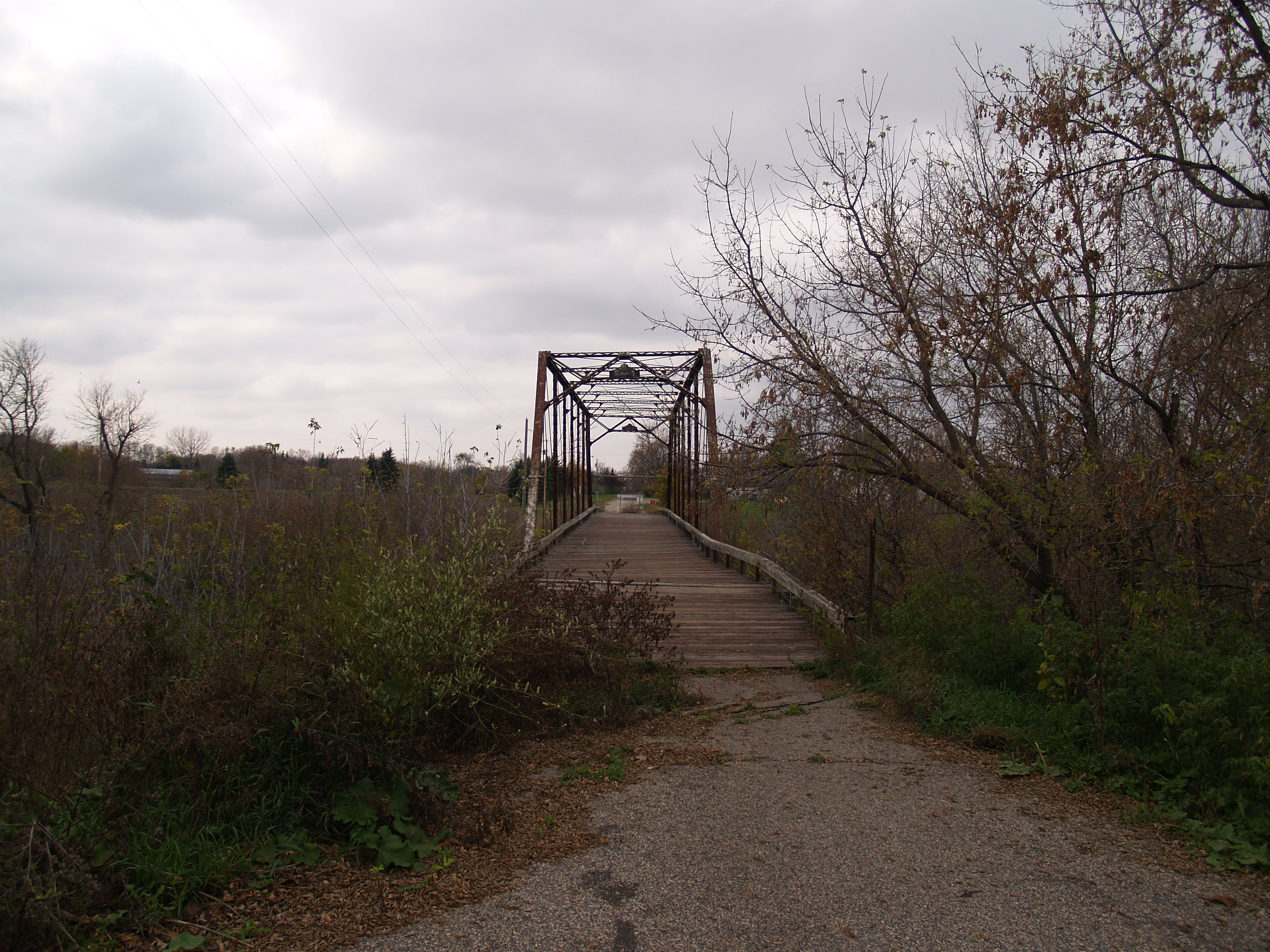
- Bridge in 2007

- Location within North Dakota Location within the United States
- Nearest city: Caledonia, North Dakota
- Coordinates: 47°27′26″N 96°53′3″W
- Area: less than one acre
- Built: 1895
- Architect: Wrought Iron Bridge Co.
- Architectural style: Pratt through truss
- MPS: Historic Roadway Bridges of North Dakota MPS
- NRHP reference No.: 97000188
- Added to NRHP: February 27, 1997

The Caledonia Bridge, also known as Goose River Bridge, over the Goose River near Caledonia, North Dakota, was built in 1895. It was designed/built by the Wrought Iron Bridge Co. and is a Pratt through truss bridge. It was listed on the National Register of Historic Places in 1997.
