= Crystal, North Dakota =

- City
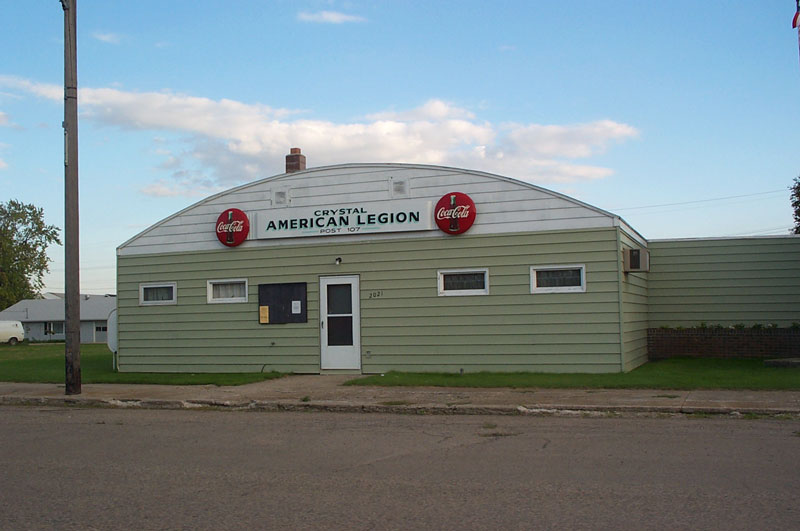
- American Legion post in Crystal, North Dakota

- Location of Crystal, North Dakota
- Coordinates: 48°35′53″N 97°40′07″W
- Country: United States
- State: North Dakota
- County: Pembina
- Founded: 1879

Area
  - Total: 0.69 sq mi (1.78 km^{2})
  - Land: 0.69 sq mi (1.78 km^{2})
  - Water: 0 sq mi (0.00 km^{2})
- Elevation: 912 ft (278 m)

Population (2020)
  - Total: 116
  - Estimate (2022): 113
  - Density: 168.5/sq mi (65.05/km^{2})
- Time zone: UTC-6 (Central (CST))
  - Summer (DST): UTC-5 (CDT)
- ZIP code: 58222
- Area code: 701
- FIPS code: 38-17060
- GNIS feature ID: 1035982

Crystal is a city in Pembina County, North Dakota, United States. The population was 116 at the 2020 census. Crystal was founded in 1879.

== History ==
Crystal was laid out in 1879. A post office has been in operation at Crystal since 1880.

== Geography ==
The Cart Creek runs along the town and is crossed by the Crystal Bridge.

According to the United States Census Bureau, the city has a total area of 0.65 square miles (1.68 km^{2}), all land.

== Demographics ==
Historical population
Census	Pop.	Note	%±
1900	385		—
1910	376		−2.3%
1920	349		−7.2%
1930	314		−10.0%
1940	428		36.3%
1950	429		0.2%
1960	372		−13.3%
1970	272		−26.9%
1980	256		−5.9%
1990	199		−22.3%
2000	167		−16.1%
2010	138		−17.4%
2020	116		−15.9%
2022 (est.)	113		−2.6%
U.S. Decennial Census; 2020 Census

=== 2010 census ===
As of the census of 2010, there were 138 people, 62 households, and 36 families residing in the city. The population density was 212.3 inhabitants per square mile (82.0/km^{2}). There were 78 housing units at an average density of 120.0 per square mile (46.3/km^{2}). The racial makeup of the city was 93.5% White, 1.4% Native American, 4.3% from other races, and 0.7% from two or more races. Hispanic or Latino of any race were 5.8% of the population.

There were 62 households, of which 25.8% had children under the age of 18 living with them, 41.9% were married couples living together, 8.1% had a female householder with no husband present, 8.1% had a male householder with no wife present, and 41.9% were non-families. 33.9% of all households were made up of individuals, and 22.6% had someone living alone who was 65 years of age or older. The average household size was 2.23 and the average family size was 2.86.

The median age in the city was 47.5 years. 23.9% of residents were under the age of 18; 6.5% were between the ages of 18 and 24; 15.9% were from 25 to 44; 34.7% were from 45 to 64; and 18.8% were 65 years of age or older. The gender makeup of the city was 48.6% male and 51.4% female.

=== 2000 census ===
As of the census of 2000, there were 167 people, 76 households, and 45 families residing in the city. The population density was 256.0 inhabitants per square mile (98.8/km^{2}). There were 92 housing units at an average density of 141.0 per square mile (54.4/km^{2}). The racial makeup of the city was 93.41% White, 6.59% from other races. Hispanic or Latino of any race were 6.59% of the population.

There were 76 households, out of which 25.0% had children under the age of 18 living with them, 50.0% were married couples living together, 7.9% had a female householder with no husband present, and 39.5% were non-families. 36.8% of all households were made up of individuals, and 13.2% had someone living alone who was 65 years of age or older. The average household size was 2.20 and the average family size was 2.91.

In the city, the population was spread out, with 24.6% under the age of 18, 6.0% from 18 to 24, 21.0% from 25 to 44, 29.3% from 45 to 64, and 19.2% who were 65 years of age or older. The median age was 44 years. For every 100 females, there were 94.2 males. For every 100 females age 18 and over, there were 96.9 males.

The median income for a household in the city was $28,571, and the median income for a family was $32,500. Males had a median income of $35,417 versus $20,000 for females. The per capita income for the city was $18,291. About 2.4% of families and 5.7% of the population were below the poverty line, including 3.2% of those under the age of eighteen and 4.9% of those 65 or over.

== Notable person ==
- Fern Headley, defenceman with the Montreal Canadiens and Boston Bruins
