= Goose River (Kings County) =

River in Kings County, Prince Edward Island, Canada

- Location of the mouth of the Goose River in Prince Edward Island

Location
- Country: Canada
- Province: Prince Edward Island
- County: Kings

Physical characteristics
- Source: Unnamed field
  - coordinates: 46°27′55″N 62°31′03″W
  - elevation: 17 m (56 ft)
- Mouth: Gulf of Saint Lawrence
  - coordinates: 46°28′15″N 62°31′10″W
  - elevation: 0 m (0 ft)
- Length: 600 m (0.37 mi)

Basin features
- River system: Gulf of Saint Lawrence

The Goose River is a short river in the community of Goose River in Kings County, Prince Edward Island, Canada. It lies on the northeast shore of the province and flows 600 metres (2,000 ft) from its source in an unnamed field northwest to the Gulf of Saint Lawrence. It has one unnamed left tributary that enters 200 metres (660 ft) downstream from the river's source.
