= Grace City, North Dakota =

Grace City
- City
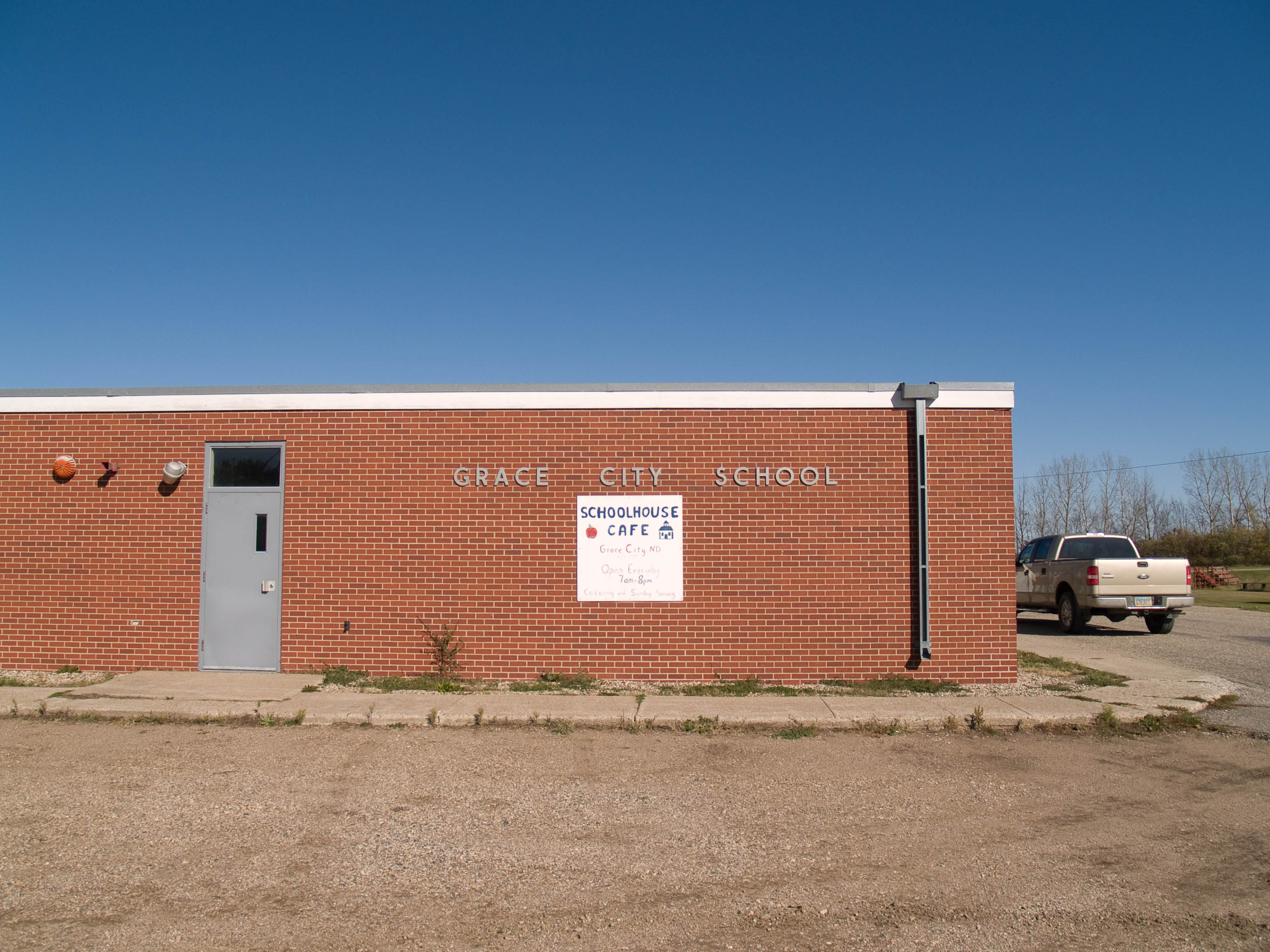
- Grace City School

- Location of Grace City, North Dakota
- Coordinates: 47°33′05″N 98°48′14″W
- Country: United States
- State: North Dakota
- County: Foster
- Founded: 1910

Area
  - Total: 0.24 sq mi (0.63 km^{2})
  - Land: 0.24 sq mi (0.63 km^{2})
  - Water: 0 sq mi (0.00 km^{2})
- Elevation: 1,512 ft (461 m)

Population (2020)
  - Total: 53
  - Estimate (2022): 54
  - Density: 216.7/sq mi (83.65/km^{2})
- Time zone: UTC–6 (Central (CST))
  - Summer (DST): UTC–5 (CDT)
- ZIP Code: 58445
- Area code: 701
- FIPS code: 38-31740
- GNIS feature ID: 1036062

Grace City is a city in Foster County, North Dakota, United States. The population was 53 at the 2020 census. Grace City was founded in 1910.

== Geography ==
According to the United States Census Bureau, the city has a total area of 0.40 square miles (1.04 km^{2}), all land.

== Demographics ==
Historical population
Census	Pop.	Note	%±
1990	108		—
2000	71		−34.3%
2010	63		−11.3%
2020	53		−15.9%
2022 (est.)	54		1.9%
U.S. Decennial Census; 2020 Census

=== 2010 census ===
As of the census of 2010, there were 63 people, 30 households, and 17 families residing in the city. The population density was 157.5 inhabitants per square mile (60.8/km^{2}). There were 36 housing units at an average density of 90.0 per square mile (34.7/km^{2}). The racial makeup of the city was 98.4% White and 1.6% Native American.

There were 30 households, of which 30.0% had children under the age of 18 living with them, 36.7% were married couples living together, 16.7% had a female householder with no husband present, 3.3% had a male householder with no wife present, and 43.3% were non-families. 36.7% of all households were made up of individuals, and 10% had someone living alone who was 65 years of age or older. The average household size was 2.10 and the average family size was 2.82.

The median age in the city was 36.5 years. 27% of residents were under the age of 18; 6.3% were between the ages of 18 and 24; 20.6% were from 25 to 44; 31.7% were from 45 to 64; and 14.3% were 65 years of age or older. The gender makeup of the city was 57.1% male and 42.9% female.

=== 2000 census ===
As of the census of 2000, there were 71 people, 30 households, and 17 families residing in the city. The population density was 176.4 inhabitants per square mile (68.1/km^{2}). There were 39 housing units at an average density of 96.9 per square mile (37.4/km^{2}). The racial makeup of the city was 100.00% White. Hispanic or Latino of any race were 1.41% of the population.

There were 30 households, out of which 30.0% had children under the age of 18 living with them, 46.7% were married couples living together, 6.7% had a female householder with no husband present, and 43.3% were non-families. 36.7% of all households were made up of individuals, and 20.0% had someone living alone who was 65 years of age or older. The average household size was 2.37 and the average family size was 3.29.

In the city, the population was spread out, with 29.6% under the age of 18, 9.9% from 18 to 24, 26.8% from 25 to 44, 23.9% from 45 to 64, and 9.9% who were 65 years of age or older. The median age was 37 years. For every 100 females, there were 86.8 males. For every 100 females age 18 and over, there were 85.2 males.

The median income for a household in the city was $33,333, and the median income for a family was $43,750. Males had a median income of $32,321 versus $20,000 for females. The per capita income for the city was $14,789. There were 15.8% of families and 18.2% of the population living below the poverty line, including 17.1% of under eighteens and 100.0% of those over 64.
