= Northwood Bridge =

- Formerly listed on the U.S. National Register of Historic Places
- Location within North Dakota Location within the United States
- Location: Across the Goose River, unnamed county rd., 1.5 mi. SW of Northwood, North Dakota
- Coordinates: 47°43′3″N 97°36′25″W
- Built: 1906
- Architect: Fargo Bridge & Iron Co.
- Architectural style: Pratt pony truss
- MPS: Historic Roadway Bridges of North Dakota MPS
- NRHP reference No.: 97000175

Significant dates
- Added to NRHP: February 27, 1997
- Removed from NRHP: June 10, 2021

The Northwood Bridge, also known as Goose River Bridge, was a historic 56-foot-long (17 m) bridge across the Goose River about 1.5 miles (2.4 km) from Northwood, North Dakota. Dating from 1906, it was significant as a relatively rare example of a half-hip type of Pratt pony truss bridge. It was also significant as the oldest surviving documented bridge in Grand Forks County, North Dakota. The bridge was listed on the National Register of Historic Places in 1997. It was destroyed by an overweight load in 2019.

Another bridge on the same river, the Goose River Bridge, is also NRHP-listed in North Dakota. The Northwood Bridge was listed a few months later.

The Northwood Bridge was one of ten bridges of the Fargo Bridge & Iron Co. in North Dakota that were listed on the National Register.

== Collapse ==
On July 22, 2019, at approximately 1:15 pm, a 2005 Peterbilt tractor trailer driven by Michael Dodds and loaded with dry beans attempted to cross over the restricted-weight bridge. The bridge collapsed, and the trailer became hung up on the west abutment. The bridge was rated for 14 short tons (13 t) gross weight, with restrictions marked. Dodds's truck's weight was just over 43 tons, or 86,750 pounds (39.35 t). An overload citation of $11,400 was issued. Dodds was uninjured. The estimated replacement cost of the bridge is between $800,000.00 and $1,000,000.
