= Caledonia, North Dakota =

- Census-designated place & unincorporated community
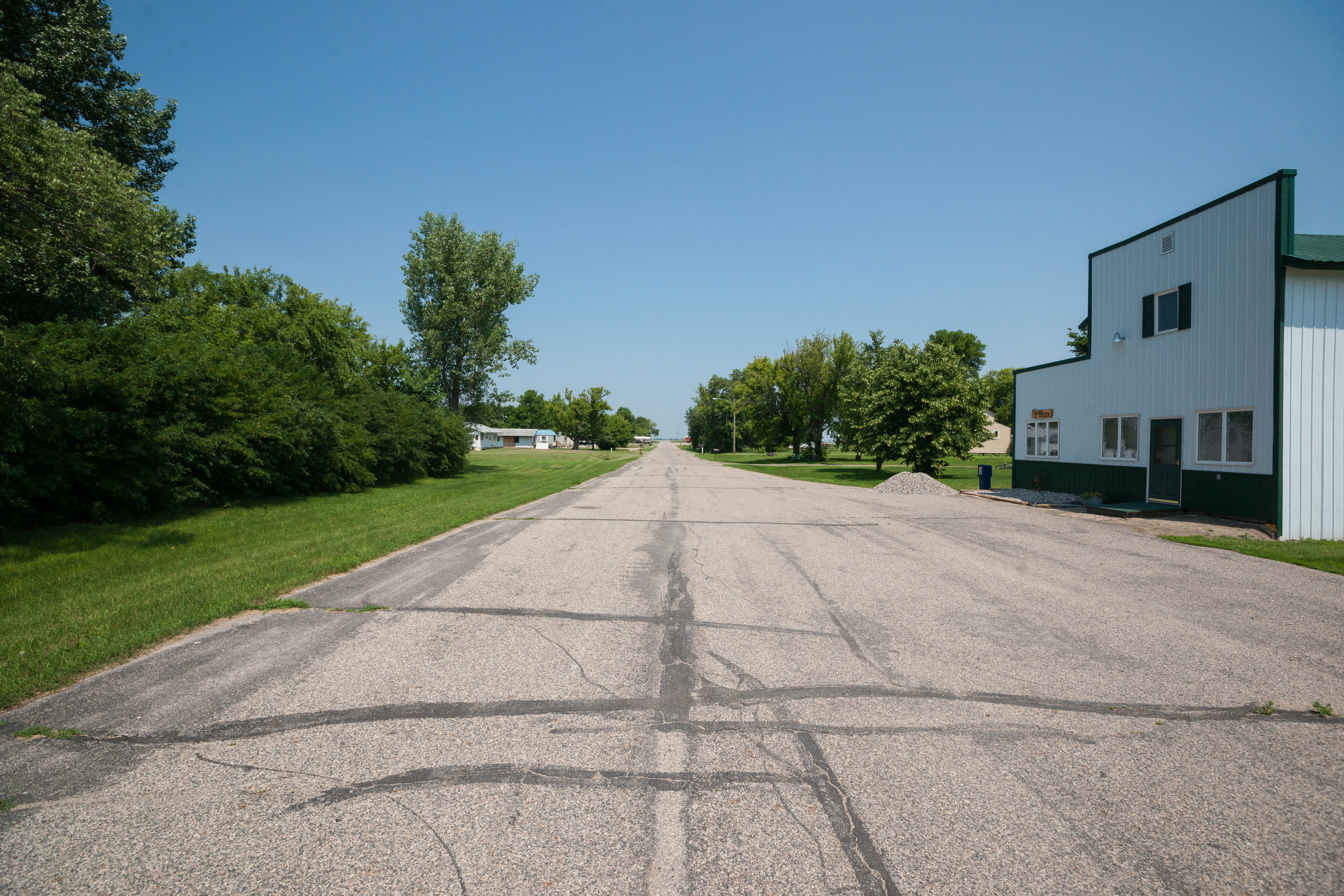
- Main Street

- Location within the state of North Dakota
- Coordinates: 47°27′28″N 096°53′21″W
- Country: United States
- State: North Dakota
- County: Traill

Area
  - Total: 0.52 sq mi (1.35 km^{2})
  - Land: 0.52 sq mi (1.35 km^{2})
  - Water: 0 sq mi (0.00 km^{2})
- Elevation: 856 ft (261 m)

Population (2020)
  - Total: 37
  - Density: 71/sq mi (27.5/km^{2})
- Time zone: UTC−6 (Central (CST))
  - Summer (DST): UTC−5 (CDT)
- ZIP code: 58219
- Area code: 701
- FIPS code: 38-11500
- GNIS feature ID: 2584338

Caledonia is a census-designated place in Traill County, North Dakota, United States. A former boomtown of the 1870s and the era of the Hudson's Bay Company steamship trade, the community has now all but virtually disappeared.

An unincorporated community, it was designated as part of the U.S. Census Bureau's Participant Statistical Areas Program on March 31, 2010. It was not counted separately during the 2000 Census, but was included in the 2010 Census, where a population of 39 was reported. As of the 2020 census, Caledonia had a population of 37.

== History ==
First called Goose River, the community was established as a post for the Hudson's Bay Company steamships which operated on the Red River of the North. Caledonia became an early boom town in the Red River Valley and also became a post for a stagecoach line which lead north to Fort Garry — now called Winnipeg. Upon the creation of Traill County in 1875, Caledonia was designated as the county seat. However, in that same year, the Hudson's Bay Company closed their U.S. posts including the one at Caledonia.

When James J. Hill's railroad crossed Traill County, it bypassed Caledonia, reputedly because Hill hadn't received hospitality there. The steamboat industry soon floundered and the county seat was moved to Hillsboro, named after Hill, in 1896.

== Geography ==
Caledonia sits on the banks of the Goose River near the confluence with the Red River of the North.

== Demographics ==
Historical population
Census	Pop.	Note	%±
2020	37		—
U.S. Decennial Census

== Education ==
It is within the Hillsboro Public School District 9.
