= Nesheim Bridge =

- U.S. National Register of Historic Places
- Location within North Dakota Location within the United States
- Nearest city: McVille, North Dakota
- Coordinates: 47°44′15″N 98°13′6″W
- Area: less than one acre
- Built: 1904
- Built by: Fargo Bridge & Iron Co.
- Architectural style: Pratt through truss
- MPS: Historic Roadway Bridges of North Dakota MPS
- NRHP reference No.: 97000185
- Added to NRHP: February 27, 1997

The Nesheim Bridge near McVille, North Dakota is a Pratt through truss structure that was built in 1904 to cross the Sheyenne River. It was listed on the National Register of Historic Places in 1997.

It was argued significant partly because it is "the oldest documented metal truss bridge in Nelson County." It was built in 1904 as a replacement to a bridge named "Sampson Crossing" that was deemed, in 1904, to be "'entirely useless'" by county commissioners. The low bid for the job was that of Fargo Bridge & Iron Co., for $2,318.
