= Goose River Bridge (Hillsboro, North Dakota) =

- Formerly listed on the U.S. National Register of Historic Places
- Location within North Dakota Location within the United States
- Nearest city: Hillsboro, North Dakota
- Coordinates: 47°26′41″N 96°55′15″W
- Area: less than one acre
- Built: 1893
- Built by: Wrought Iron Bridge Co.
- Architectural style: Pratt through truss
- MPS: Historic Roadway Bridges of North Dakota MPS
- NRHP reference No.: 97000187

Significant dates
- Added to NRHP: February 27, 1997
- Removed from NRHP: March 25, 2009

The Goose River Bridge was a Pratt through truss bridge over the Goose River near Hillsboro, North Dakota that was built in 1893. It was listed on the National Register of Historic Places in 1997.

It was delisted from the National Register on March 25, 2009.

== See also ==
- Northwood Bridge, (collapsed on June 22, 2019) also known as Goose River Bridge, a historic bridge from 1906, also NRHP-listed in North Dakota
