= Crystal Bridge (Crystal, North Dakota) =

- U.S. National Register of Historic Places
- Location within North Dakota Location within the United States
- Nearest city: Crystal, North Dakota
- Coordinates: 48°35′49″N 97°40′20″W
- Area: less than one acre
- Built: 1927
- Built by: Fargo Bridge & Iron Co.
- Architectural style: Concrete T-beam bridge
- MPS: Historic Roadway Bridges of North Dakota MPS
- NRHP reference No.: 97000507
- Added to NRHP: May 30, 1997

Crystal Bridge in Crystal, North Dakota is a bridge which was built in 1927 over the Cart Creek. It was listed on the National Register of Historic Places in 1997.

According to its NRHP nomination, the bridge "is a two-span concrete T-beam structure, some 66 feet long. Concrete T-beam designs saw occasional use in North Dakota during the first half of the twentieth century, as bridge builders began experimenting with the increased use of reinforced concrete in heavy load-bearing applications."

It was listed on the National Register of Historic Places in 1997.

It is owned and maintained by Pembina County.
