= Colton's Crossing Bridge =

- U.S. National Register of Historic Places
- Location within North Dakota Location within the United States
- Nearest city: Lisbon, North Dakota
- Coordinates: 46°23′2″N 97°37′58″W
- Area: less than one acre
- Built: 1907
- Built by: Hewett Bridge Co.
- Architectural style: Pratt through truss
- MPS: Historic Roadway Bridges of North Dakota MPS
- NRHP reference No.: 97000186
- Added to NRHP: February 27, 1997

The Colton's Crossing Bridge, in Ransom County, North Dakota, United States, near Lisbon, North Dakota, also known as Sheyenne River Bridge, was built in 1907. It was listed on the U.S. National Register of Historic Places (NRHP) in 1997.

According to its NRHP nomination, the

bridge serves as a representative example of the pattern; it is the oldest documented bridge in [Ransom County] constructed by a long-term county bridge builder, the Hewett Bridge Company. The bridge is also significant ... for its association with attempts by North Dakota counties to expand and improve transportation networks prior to 1926 by construction of through truss bridges, relatively costly structures. Through truss bridges with documented construction dates and builders, such as this one, best illustrate this important trend in North Dakota bridge construction.

It is also significant as being the oldest surviving metal truss bridge in Ransom County. It was built in 1907 for a contract price of $3,890.

It crosses the Sheyenne River.
