= Bedstead truss bridge =

Type of bridge

A bedstead truss bridge is a kind of truss bridge whose vertical endposts are crucial, acting in compression.
