= Sheyenne River =

River in North Dakota, U.S.

Coordinates: 47°01′25″N 96°49′31″W

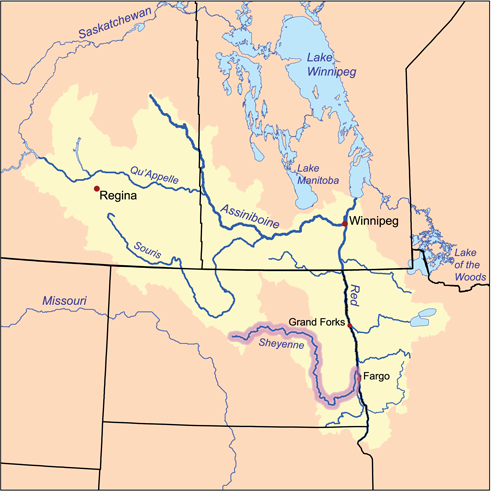
The Red River drainage basin, with the Sheyenne River highlighted

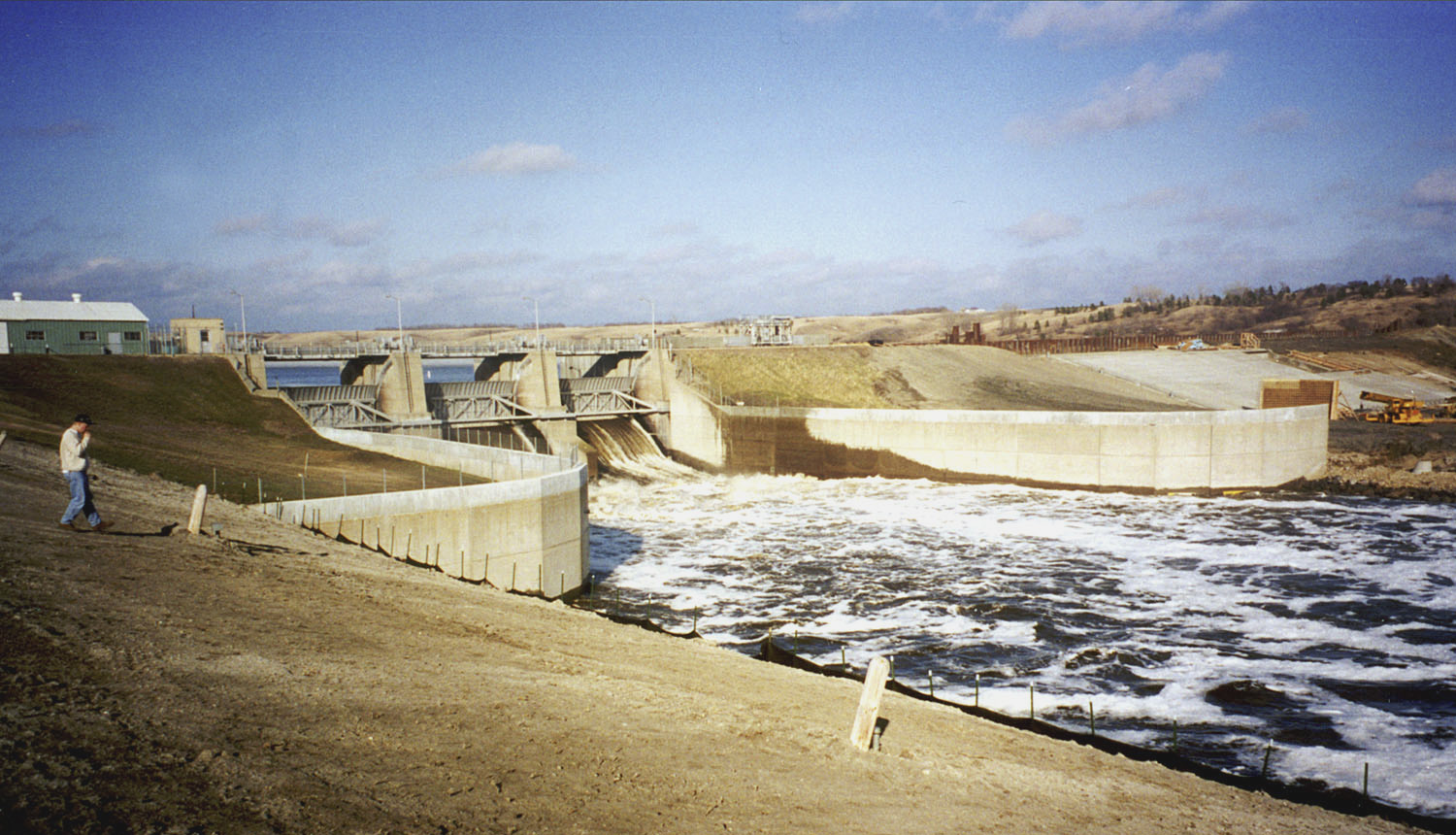
Baldhill Dam on the Sheyenne River during the spring 1996 floods

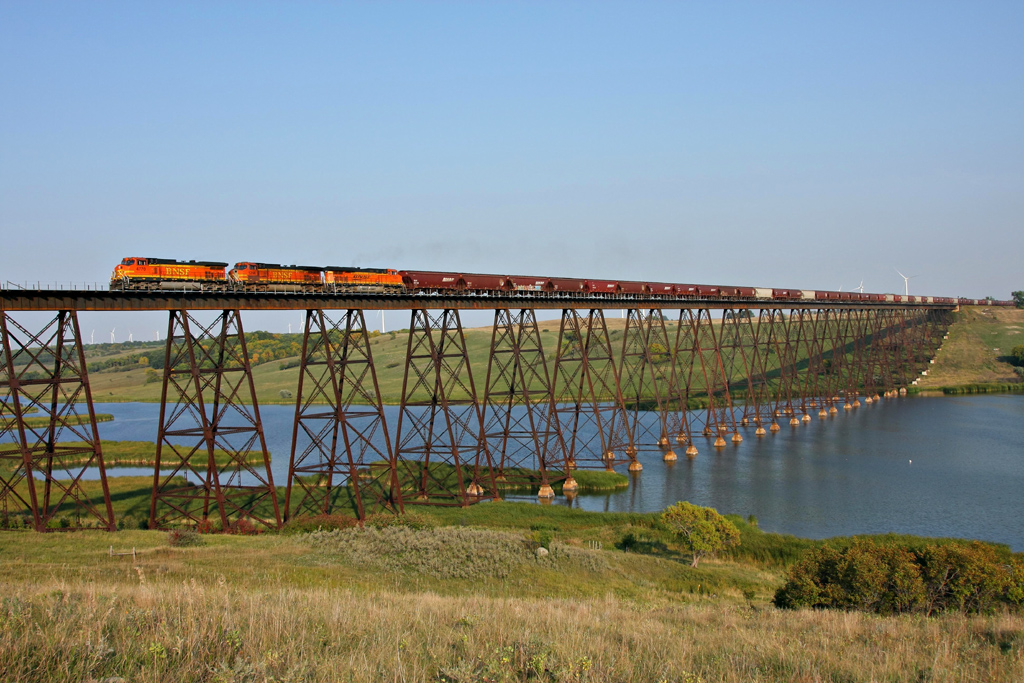
A BNSF Railway freight train crosses the Sheyenne near Karnak in 2009.

The Sheyenne River is one of the major tributaries of the Red River of the North, meandering 591 miles (951 km) across eastern North Dakota, United States.

The river begins about 15 miles (24 km) north of McClusky, and flows generally eastward before turning south near McVille. The southerly flow of the river continues through Griggs and Barnes counties before it turns in a northeastward direction near Lisbon. The river forms the 27-mile long Lake Ashtabula behind the Baldhill Dam north of Valley City, which was constructed in 1951 for flood control by the US Army Corps of Engineers.

The Sheyenne is classified as a "perch river," as its banks are higher than the surrounding ground, formed as natural levees in flooding centuries ago. When floodwaters break through the banks, they spread in a wide area.

From Lisbon, the river crosses the Sheyenne National Grassland and enters Cass County near the city of Kindred. This stretch of the river is designated a National Wild and Scenic Riverway. From Kindred, the river flows north-northeastward through the fertile plains of the Red River Valley.

The character of the river changes as it leaves the sandy grasslands and picks up the fertile clay soil of the Red River Valley. Previously, the river posed a flooding hazard to cities such as West Fargo and Harwood, where it joins the Red River of the North, which flows north to Lake Winnipeg in Manitoba. Thanks to a diversion canal completed near Horace and extending past West Fargo, these major Sheyenne River cities fared well in the 1997 Red River flood. By contrast, this flood devastated the cities of Grand Forks in North Dakota and East Grand Forks in Minnesota.

The Sheyenne diversion canal, built 1990-1992 in a joint federal-state effort, channels waters around the edges of the cities to draw off floodwaters. It was built primarily by the US Army Corps of Engineers, at a cost of $27.8 million. In West Fargo alone, the diversion project involved construction of:

- 6.8 mile diversion control
- 12.7 miles of protection levees
- 4 diversion structures
- 2 pumping stations (54,000 and 66,000 gpm)
- 1 railroad bridge
- 4 highway bridges
- 6 road raises.

The Sheyenne River was named after the Cheyenne Indians of the area. Alternate names include: Cayenne River, Cheyenne River, and Maitomoni'ohe.

The Sheyenne River was formed by the meltwater of the Wisconsinan glacier about 13,000 years ago. The valley constitutes the glacier’s western edge at that time. Flowing 581 miles (~929 km) from its headwaters located 15 miles north of McClusky in Sheridan County until it converges with the Red River at Fargo, the Sheyenne River is the longest river located within North Dakota. The river valley from Baldhill Dam at Lake Ashtabula and south to Lisbon can be as deep as 200 feet and a mile wide.

Anglers can find northern pike, walleye, yellow perch, channel catfish and white bass in its lower reaches. Records indicate 53 fish species known to inhabit the Sheyenne, about twice the number of species found in other tributaries of the Red River. Two rare fish - the rosyface shiner and the pugnose shiner - and three rare mussels - the mapleleaf, black sandshell, and pigtoe clams - live in the Sheyenne.

== Crossings ==
The river is crossed by several historic bridges, including the Lisbon Bridge and the Colton's Crossing Bridge in Lisbon; the West Park Bridge in Valley City; the West Antelope Bridge in Flora; the Romness Bridge near Cooperstown; and the Nesheim Bridge at McVille.

In Valley City it is crossed by several more bridges, including the Hi-Line Railroad Bridge and, before demolition, the Rainbow Arch Bridge.

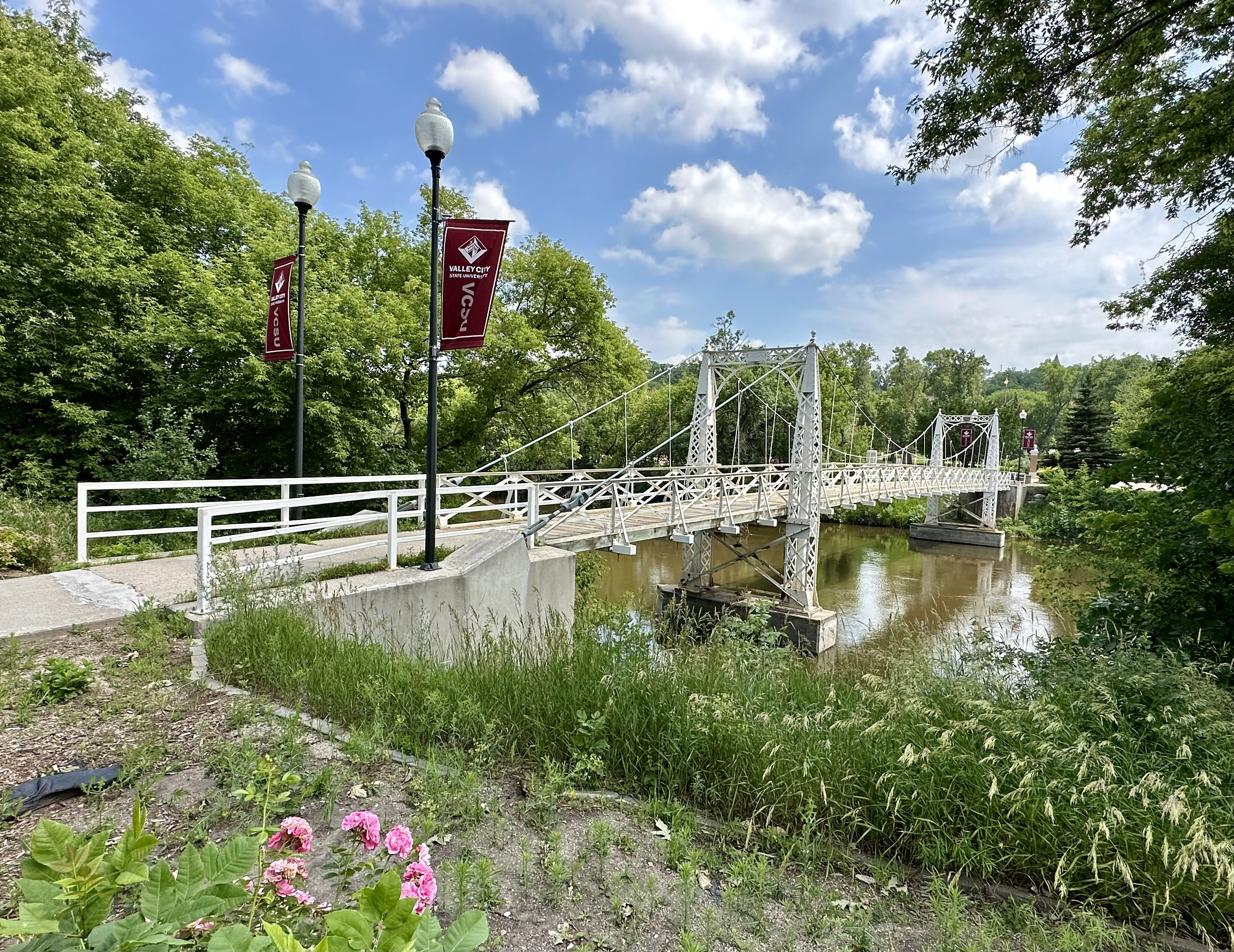
Valley City State University Footbridge crosses the Sheyenne River

== See also ==
- List of longest rivers of the United States (by main stem)
