= Romness Bridge =

Historic bridge in North Dakota, United States

- U.S. National Register of Historic Places
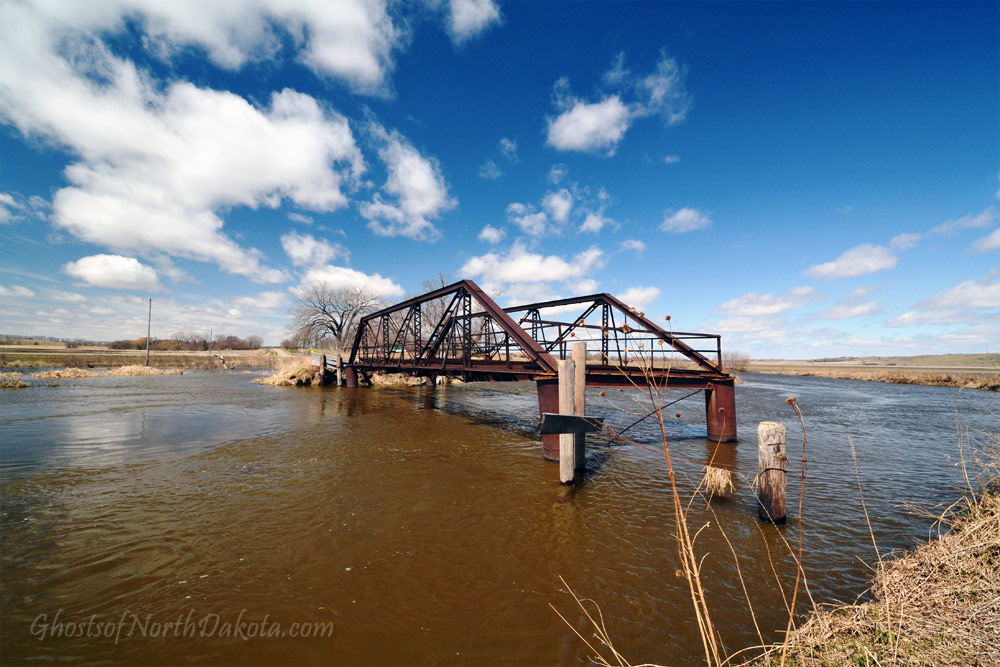

- Location within North Dakota Location within the United States
- Nearest city: Cooperstown, North Dakota
- Coordinates: 47°31′44″N 98°1′48″W
- Area: less than one acre
- Built: 1912
- Built by: Great Northern Bridge Co.
- Architectural style: Pratt through truss
- MPS: Historic Roadway Bridges of North Dakota MPS
- NRHP reference No.: 97000179
- Added to NRHP: February 27, 1997

The Romness Bridge near Cooperstown, North Dakota is a Pratt through truss structure that was built in 1912 over the Sheyenne River. It was listed on the National Register of Historic Places in 1997.
