= Portland, North Dakota =

- City
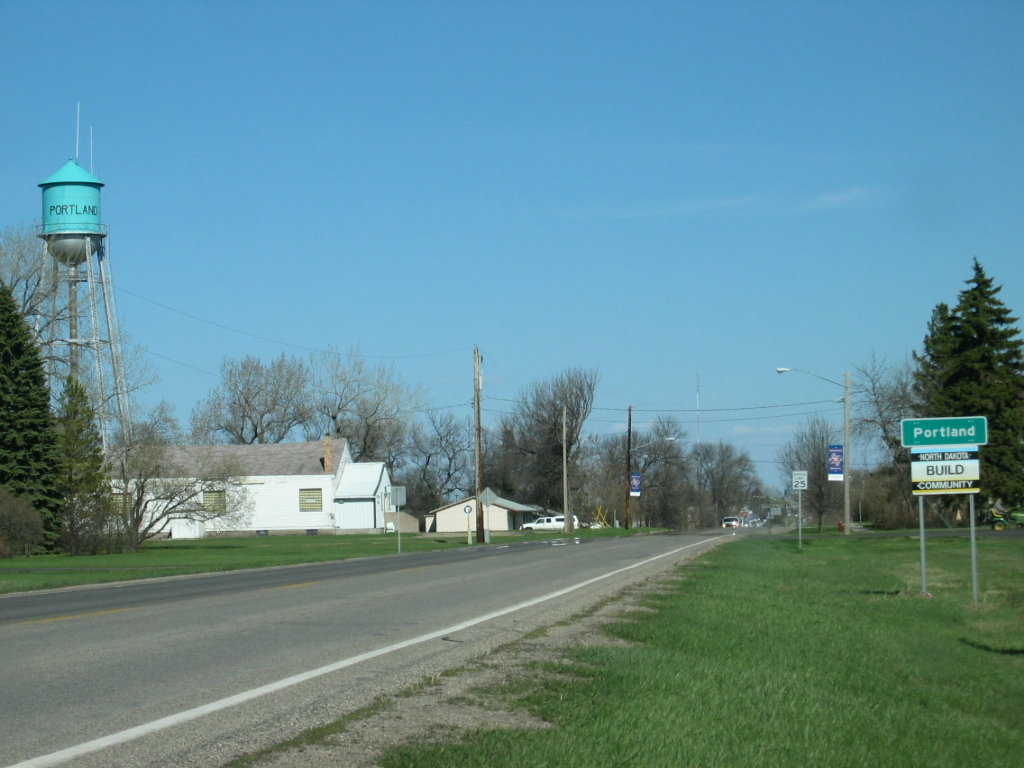
- Entrance through Portland on Hwy 200.

- Location of Portland, North Dakota
- Coordinates: 47°30′2″N 97°22′19″W
- Country: United States
- State: North Dakota
- County: Traill
- Settlement: 1871
- Founded: 1882

Area
  - Total: 0.83 sq mi (2.16 km^{2})
  - Land: 0.83 sq mi (2.16 km^{2})
  - Water: 0 sq mi (0.00 km^{2})
- Elevation: 980 ft (300 m)

Population (2020)
  - Total: 578
  - Estimate (2022): 579
  - Density: 693.1/sq mi (267.62/km^{2})
- Time zone: UTC-6 (Central (CST))
  - Summer (DST): UTC-5 (CDT)
- ZIP code: 58274
- Area code: 701
- FIPS code: 38-63900
- GNIS feature ID: 1036227
- Website: mayvilleportland.com

Portland is a city in Traill County, North Dakota, United States. The population was 578 at the 2020 census.

Portland is the smaller neighbor city of nearby Mayville, when grouped together it's offten called "May-Port.

== History ==
The first settlement at Portland was made in 1871. Portland was laid out and platted in 1881 when the railroad was extended to that point. A post office has been in operation at Portland since 1882.

== Geography ==
According to the United States Census Bureau, the city has a total area of 0.86 square miles (2.23 km^{2}), all land.

== Demographics ==
Historical population
Census	Pop.	Note	%±
1890	367		—
1900	524		42.8%
1910	561		7.1%
1920	623		11.1%
1930	500		−19.7%
1940	551		10.2%
1950	641		16.3%
1960	606		−5.5%
1970	534		−11.9%
1980	627		17.4%
1990	602		−4.0%
2000	604		0.3%
2010	606		0.3%
2020	578		−4.6%
2022 (est.)	579		0.2%
U.S. Decennial Census; 2020 Census

=== 2010 census ===
As of the census of 2010, there were 606 people, 279 households, and 170 families residing in the city. The population density was 704.7 inhabitants per square mile (272.1/km^{2}). There were 297 housing units at an average density of 345.3 per square mile (133.3/km^{2}). The racial makeup of the city was 95.0% White, 0.7% African American, 1.5% Native American, 0.5% Asian, 1.3% from other races, and 1.0% from two or more races. Hispanic or Latino of any race were 2.6% of the population.

There were 279 households, of which 25.1% had children under the age of 18 living with them, 50.2% were married couples living together, 7.5% had a female householder with no husband present, 3.2% had a male householder with no wife present, and 39.1% were non-families. 35.1% of all households were made up of individuals, and 21.9% had someone living alone who was 65 years of age or older. The average household size was 2.17 and the average family size was 2.76.

The median age in the city was 45.9 years. 21.3% of residents were under the age of 18; 10% were between the ages of 18 and 24; 17.3% were from 25 to 44; 26.3% were from 45 to 64; and 25.2% were 65 years of age or older. The gender makeup of the city was 48.5% male and 51.5% female.

=== 2000 census ===
As of the census of 2000, there were 604 people, 269 households, and 161 families residing in the city. The population density was 702.0 inhabitants per square mile (271.0/km^{2}). There were 286 housing units at an average density of 332.4 per square mile (128.3/km^{2}). The racial makeup of the city was 99.50% White, 0.17% Asian, and 0.33% from two or more races. Hispanic or Latino of any race were 0.50% of the population.

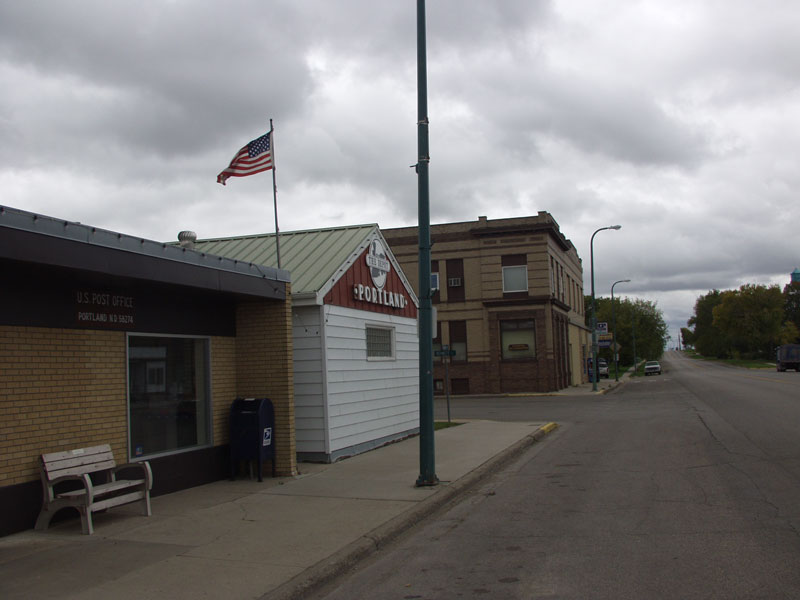
Downtown Portland, ND.

There were 269 households, out of which 28.6% had children under the age of 18 living with them, 56.5% were married couples living together, 3.3% had a female householder with no husband present, and 40.1% were non-families. 36.8% of all households were made up of individuals, and 24.2% had someone living alone who was 65 years of age or older. The average household size was 2.25 and the average family size was 2.99.

In the city, the population was spread out, with 23.7% under the age of 18, 5.3% from 18 to 24, 27.0% from 25 to 44, 20.0% from 45 to 64, and 24.0% who were 65 years of age or older. The median age was 42 years. For every 100 females, there were 102.7 males. For every 100 females age 18 and over, there were 100.4 males.

The median income for a household in the city was $30,375, and the median income for a family was $43,250. Males had a median income of $30,089 versus $18,750 for females. The per capita income for the city was $15,149. About 4.3% of families and 6.0% of the population were below the poverty line, including 5.1% of those under age 18 and 11.5% of those age 65 or over.

== Education ==
It is in the May-Port CG Public School District 14.
