= Flora, North Dakota =

- Unincorporated town
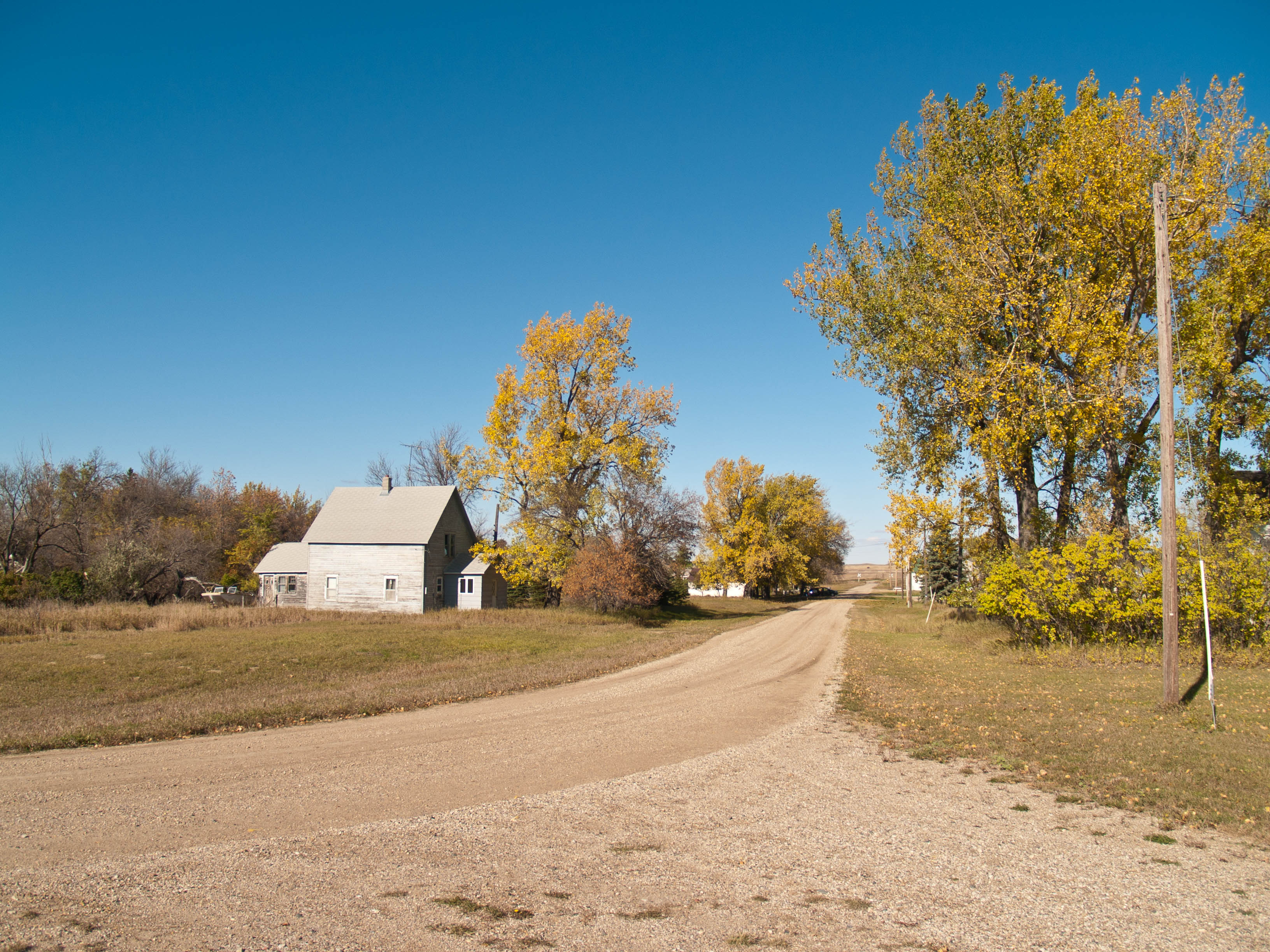

- Location within the state of North Dakota Flora, North Dakota (the United States)
- Coordinates: 47°57′01″N 99°25′04″W
- Country: United States
- State: North Dakota
- County: Benson
- Elevation: 1,578 ft (481 m)
- Time zone: UTC-7 (Mountain (MST))
  - Summer (DST): UTC-6 (MDT)
- Area code: 701
- GNIS feature ID: 1028989

Flora is an unincorporated town in Benson County, North Dakota, United States.

== History ==
It takes its name from Flora Schuyler, having until 1901 been named Schuyler after William Schuyler, her brother, who was a townsite owner. The population was 50 in 1940.
