= West Park Bridge =

- U.S. National Register of Historic Places
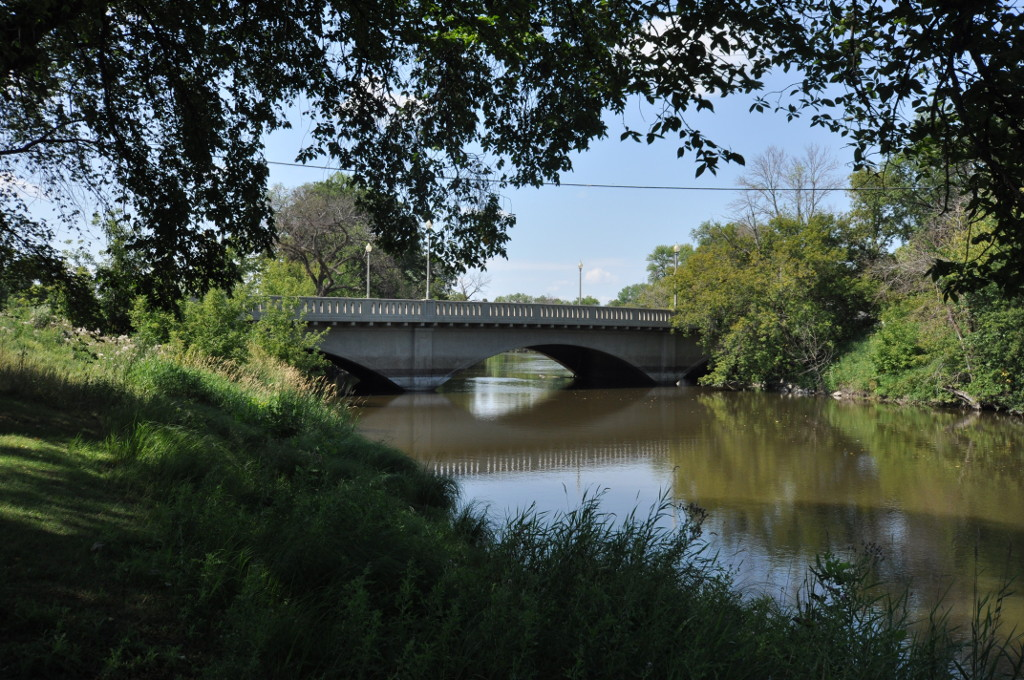
- 2017 photo of 2007 replacement bridge

- Location within North Dakota Location within the United States
- Location: 4th St., SW, across the Sheyenne River, Valley City, North Dakota
- Coordinates: 46°55′14″N 98°0′30″W
- Area: less than one acre
- Built: 1924
- Architectural style: Concrete false arch bridge
- MPS: Historic Roadway Bridges of North Dakota MPS
- NRHP reference No.: 97000169
- Added to NRHP: February 27, 1997

The West Park Bridge across the Sheyenne River in Valley City, North Dakota is a concrete false arch structure that was built in 2007. Together with the corresponding East Park Bridge, it brings Valley City's 4th Street across an oxbow of the Sheyenne River. The bridge is a sympathetic replacement for a historic bridge, built in 1924, that was listed on the National Register of Historic Places in 1997.

The 1924 bridge was deemed significant as a good example of "early twentieth-century bridge design and construction philosophies in urban North Dakota", including having design emphasis on visual detail, and for its "aesthetic merit", relating to its unusual use of the false arch girder design and to its railings and lamps.

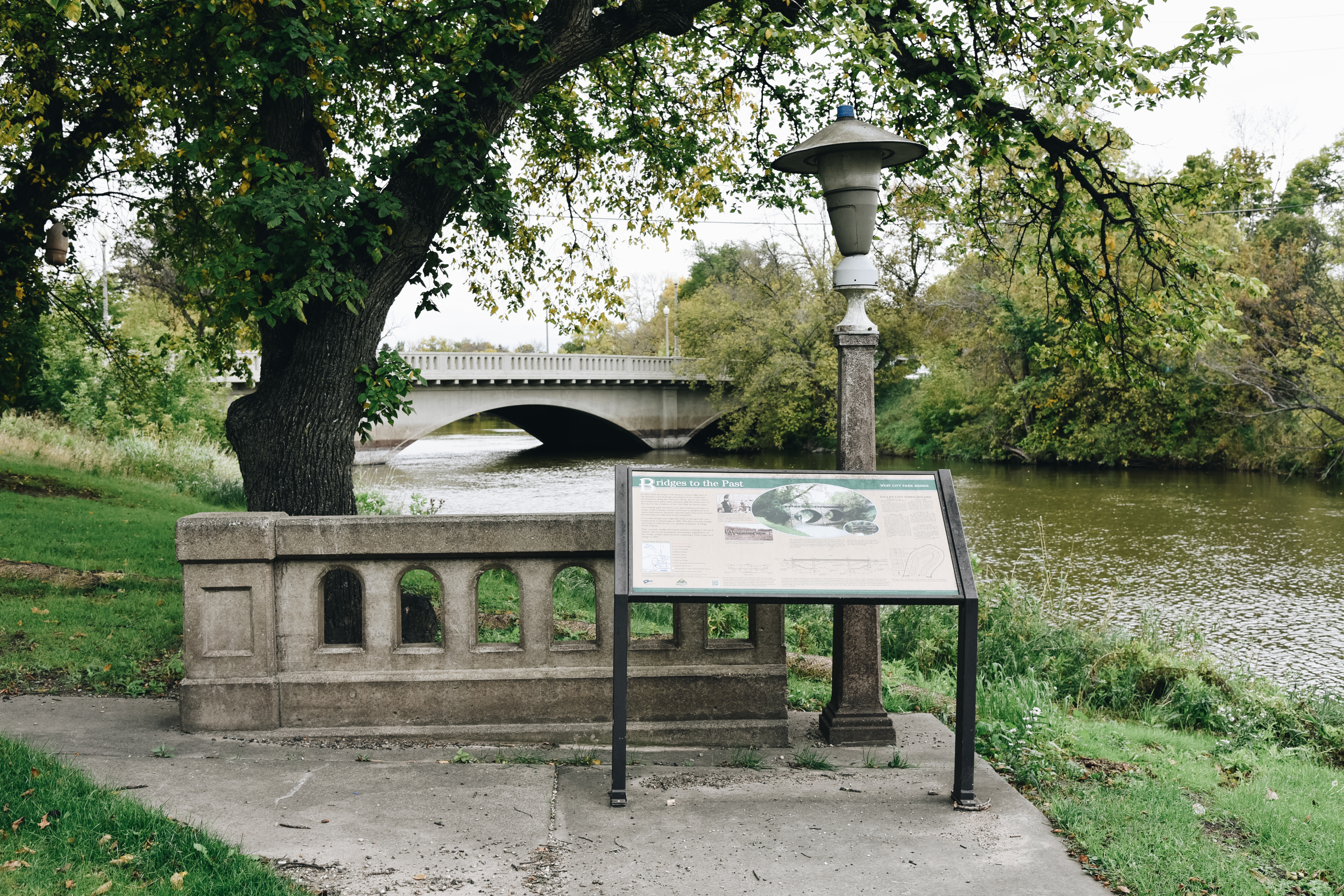
Historic Marker for the original version of the bridge.
