= Lisbon Bridge (Lisbon, North Dakota) =

- U.S. National Register of Historic Places
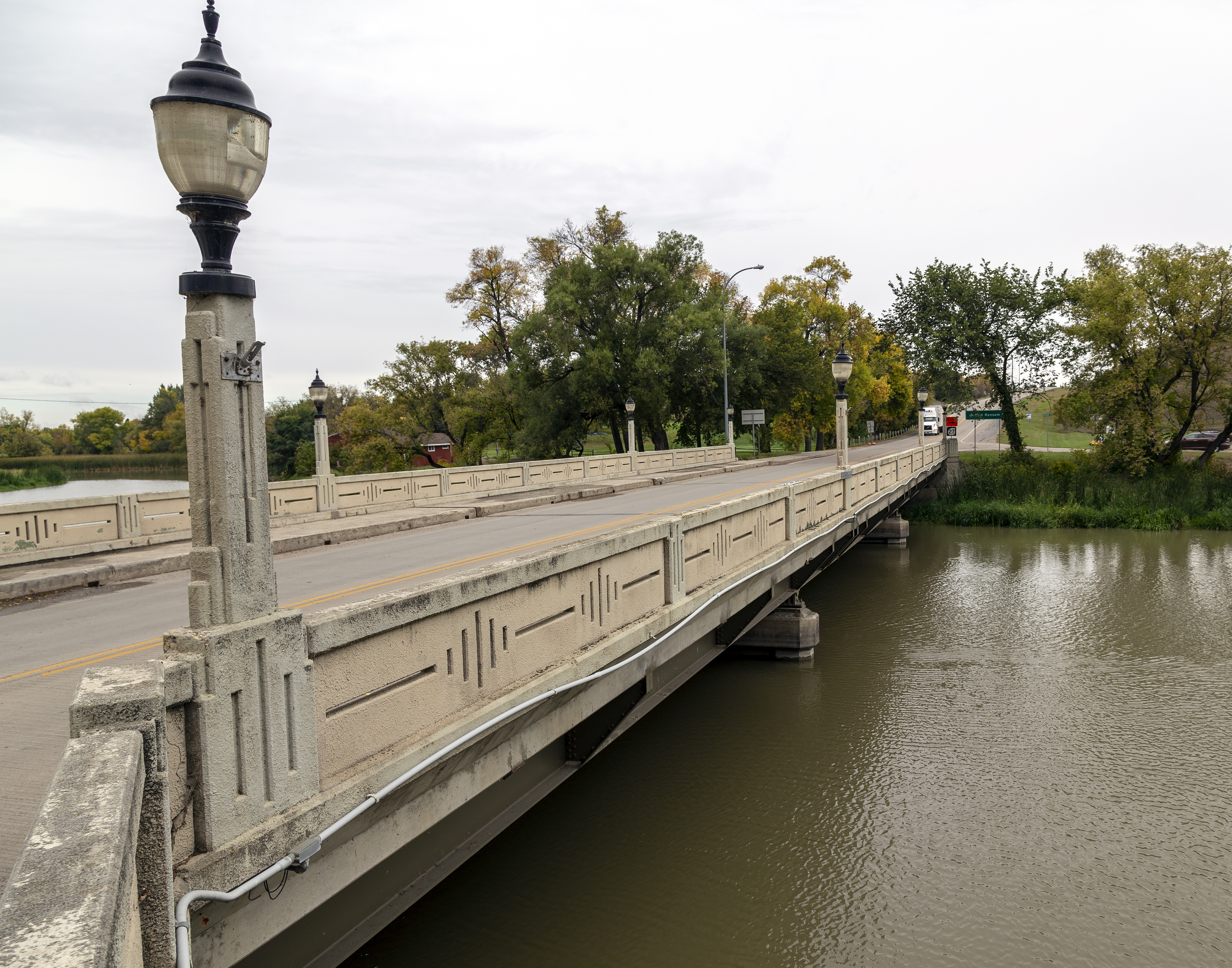

- Location within North Dakota Location within the United States
- Location: Across the Sheyenne River, ND 32, N end of Lisbon, Lisbon, North Dakota
- Coordinates: 46°26′49″N 97°40′52″W
- Area: less than one acre
- Built: 1936
- Built by: WPA
- Architectural style: Steel cantilever bean bridge
- MPS: Historic Roadway Bridges of North Dakota MPS
- NRHP reference No.: 97000184
- Added to NRHP: February 27, 1997

The Lisbon Bridge over the Sheyenne River in Lisbon, North Dakota, also known as Sheyenne River Bridge, was built by the Works Project Administration in 1936. It was listed on the National Register of Historic Places in 1997.
