= Goose River (North Dakota) =

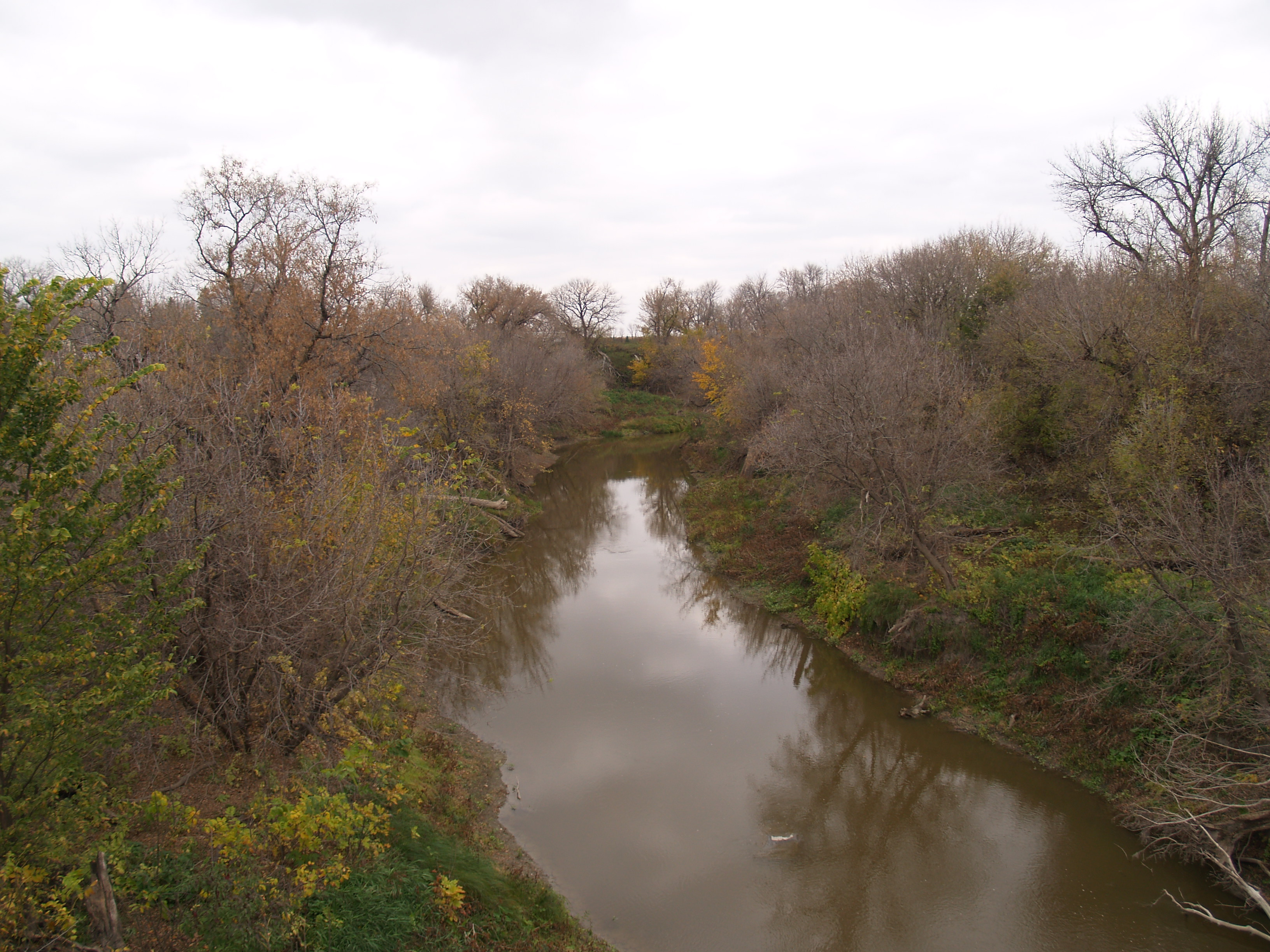
- The Goose River in Caledonia, North Dakota

Physical characteristics
- Source
  - location: Petersburg Township, Nelson County, North Dakota
  - coordinates: 47°56′11″N 98°00′55″W
  - elevation: 1,499 ft (457 m)
- Mouth
  - location: Confluence with the Red River near Caledonia, Traill County, North Dakota
  - coordinates: 47°27′35″N 96°51′21″W
  - elevation: 827 ft (252 m)
- Length: 179 mi (288 km)

Basin features
- Progression: Goose River → Red River → Lake Winnipeg → Nelson River → Hudson Bay → Atlantic Ocean
- GNIS ID: 1029181

Goose River is a 179-mile-long (288 km) tributary of the Red River of the North in North Dakota. Via the Red River, Lake Winnipeg, and the Nelson River, it is part of the watershed of Hudson Bay.

The Goose River is crossed by the Northwood Bridge and the Caledonia Bridge, both listed on the National Register of Historic Places.

== See also ==
- Category:Bridges over the Goose River (North Dakota)
