= Wyoming Highway 259 =

State highway in Natrona Wyoming, United States

Wyoming Highway 259
- Horse Ranch Creek Road
- WYO 259 highlighted in red

Route information
- Maintained by WYDOT
- Length: 18.00 mi (28.97 km)

Major junctions
- South end: I-25 / US 87 north of Antelope Hills
- North end: WYO 387 in Midwest

Location
- Country: United States
- State: Wyoming
- Counties: Natrona

Highway system
- Wyoming State Highway System; Interstate; US; State
← WYO 258	→ WYO 270
← US 85	→ US 89

Wyoming Highway 259 (WYO 259) is an 18.00-mile (28.97 km) north-south state highway in northeastern Natrona County, Wyoming, United States, that connects Interstate 25 / U.S. Route 87 (I-25 / US 87), north of Antelope Hills with Wyoming Highway 387 (WYO 387) in Midwest. It is the former routing of US 87, after that highway was relocated onto I-25.

== Route description ==
WYO 259 begins its southern end at a diamond interchange with I-25 / US 87 (Exit 210). It heads north 18.00 miles (28.97 km) to the town of Midwest, which just east of the town of Edgerton. There WYO 259 comes to an end at WYO 387 near the Salt Creek Oil Field. WYO 259 is the fastest route for travelers between Casper and Midwest.

== History ==
WYO 259 is the former routing of US 87 prior to its relocation to run concurrent with I-25.

== Major intersections ==
The entire route is in Natrona County.

Location	mi	km	Destinations	Notes
	0.00	0.00	Horse Ranch Creek Road west	Roadway continues southwest from southern terminus as a private road
	0.00	0.00	I-25 north / US 87 north – Midwest, Kaycee, Buffalo I-25 south / US 87 south – Casper, Cheyenne	Southern terminus; diamond interchange; I-25 / US 87 Exit 210
Midwest	18.00	28.97	WYO 387 north – Edgerton, Wright, Gillette; Lewis St west – Midwest Schools	Northern terminus; northbound WYO 387 heads east from intersection
Midwest	18.00	28.97	WYO 387 south – Kaycee, Buffalo	Continuation north from northern terminus; southbound WYO 387 heads north from intersection
1.000 mi = 1.609 km; 1.000 km = 0.621 mi

== See also ==
- List of state highways in Wyoming
