= Wyoming Highway 387 =

State highway in Natrona, Johnson, and Campbell counties in Wyoming, United States

Wyoming Highway 387
- WYO 387 highlighted in red

Route information
- Maintained by WYDOT
- Length: 57.81 mi (93.04 km)

Major junctions
- West end: I-25 / US 87 west of Midwest
- WYO 259 in Midwest; WYO 192 south-southeast of Linch; WYO 50 south of Savageton
- East end: WYO 59 in Wright

Location
- Country: United States
- State: Wyoming
- Counties: Natrona, Johnson, Campbell

Highway system
- Wyoming State Highway System; Interstate; US; State
← WYO 377	→ WYO 390
← US 85	→ US 89

Wyoming Highway 387 (WYO 387) is a 57.81-mile (93.04 km) state highway in Natrona, Johnson, and Campbell counties in Wyoming, United States, that connects Interstate 25 / U.S. Route 87 (I-25 / US 87), west of Midwest, with Wyoming Highway 59 (WYO 59) in Wright. Despite traveling east-west more than twice as far as it travels north-south, it is officially a north-south highway.

== Route description ==
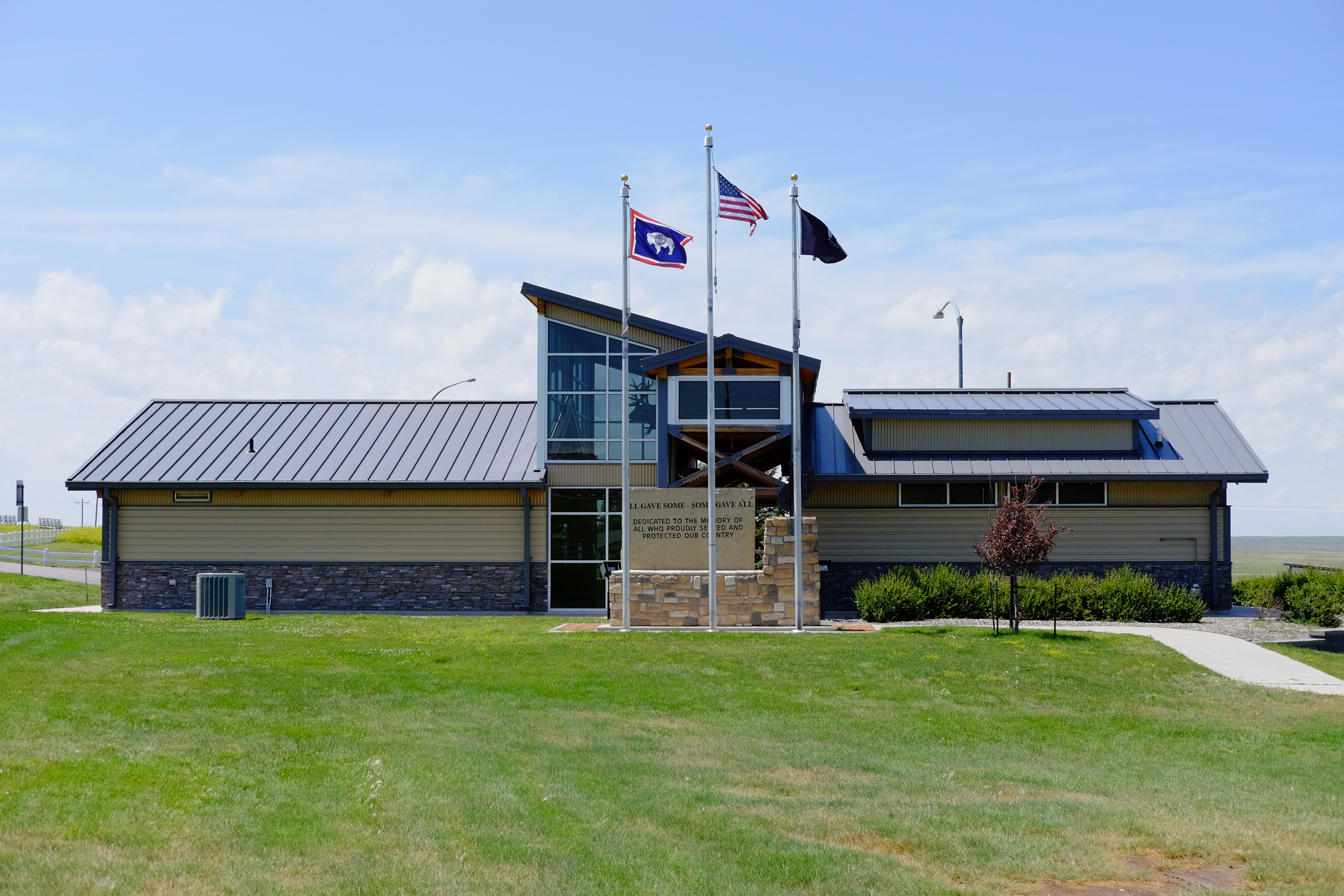
Rear view of the Wright Visitor Center, which is located along WYO 387 in Wright, July 2019

WYO 387 begins at a diamond interchange with I-25 / US 87 (exit 227). From its western terminus it heads easterly for a little more than 6 miles (9.7 km), until it reaches the town of Midwest where it meets the northern terminus of Wyoming Highway 259 (Old US 87). WYO 387 continues east entering the town of Edgerton just shortly after leaving Midwest. At 19.3 miles (31.1 km) WYO 387 intersects the eastern terminus of Wyoming Highway 192 (Sussex Road). At approximately 38 miles (61 km), WYO 387 intersects the southern terminus of Wyoming Highway 50 at Pine Tree Junction. From there WYO 387 heads in a more northeasterly direction towards its eastern terminus. At 57.81 miles (93.04 km), WYO 387 ends at Wyoming Highway 59 in Wright, a what is known as Reno Junction.

== History ==
Original (1926) US 185 shield

In 1936, WYO 387 was commissioned to replace a section of U.S. Route 185 (US 185) between Douglas and Gillette. US 185 was commissioned in 1926 to run from Cheyenne, Wyoming to Orin. It was proposed that US 185 continue north to Gillette, via US 20 between Orin and Douglas, and via WYO 50 between Douglas and Gillette. But the road now carrying WYO 59 did not exist. So, when WYO 59 was constructed in the late 1920s and early 1930s, it carried the designation US 185. After the Great Recommissioning of 1936, Wyoming 185 was renumbered to Wyoming 387, since the route directly connected to the new US 87, not U.S. Route 85. In 1945, the WYO 387 designation was changed to WYO 59.

WYO 387 was recommissioned in the late 1940s to run from US 87 in Midwest to WYO 59 in Wright. WYO 387 maintained this route until the 1980s, when I-25 was completed. At that time, WYO 387 was extended west along old US 87 to meet the new I-25. Old US 87 south of Midwest became WYO 259.

== Major intersections ==
County	Location	mi	km	Destinations	Notes
Natrona		0.00	0.00	Smokey Gap Rd (Natrona County Road 115) west	Continuation west from southern terminus
Natrona		0.00	0.00	I-25 north / US 87 north – Kaycee, Buffalo I-25 south / US 87 south – Casper, Cheyenne	Western terminus; diamond interchange I-25 / US 87 Exit 227 Former routing of US 87 between current US 87 and WYO 259
Natrona	Midwest	6.5	10.5	WYO 259 south – Casper, Cheyenne; Lewis St west – Midwest Schools	WYO 259 is former routing US 87
Johnson		19.3	31.1	WYO 192 north (Sussex Rd) – Linch, Kaycee	T intersection
Campbell		38.3	61.6	WYO 50 north – Gillette; Pine Tree Rd south	Junction is known as Pine Tree Junction
Campbell	Wright	57.81	93.04	WYO 59 north – Gillette WYO 59 south – Bill, Douglas	Eastern terminus; T intersection junction is known as Reno Junction
1.000 mi = 1.609 km; 1.000 km = 0.621 mi

== See also ==
- List of state highways in Wyoming
