= Midwest Schools =

Public school in Midwest, Wyoming, USA

Location
- 256 Lewis; Midwest, Wyoming 82643; United States
- Coordinates: 43.40902°N 106.27390°W

Information
- Type: Public
- School district: Natrona County School District
- Principal: Paula Chapman
- Grades: K–12
- Enrollment: 149 (2022-2023)
- Colors: Maroon and White
- Athletics conference: WHSAA Class 1A
- Website: Midwest Schools

Midwest Schools or Midwest School, or Midwest High School is a public school located in the town of Midwest, Natrona County, Wyoming that serves the surrounding area, including the town of Edgerton, the city of Casper, and unincorporated area of Natrona County The school has a pre-kindergarten center and is the only school in the Natrona County School District that serves students grades K–12. It is zoned for students in the city of Casper and the towns of Midwest and Edgerton. It participates in Division 1A sports in the Wyoming High School Activities Association.

== History ==
The first school in Midwest was built on Lewis Street in September 1921, where Mrs. Helen Wallace taught 32 students in one room. It was torn down in 1927.

The new high school was constructed and furnished by the end of 1924 and opened on the first Monday of 1925. Twelve seniors graduated in June 1925.

In 1925, the Midwest Refinery Company set up night lighting at the school for a football game played by Midwest High School.

Midwest High School was torn down in 1960 and the new high school was built in 1961, supported by a series of bod issues beginning in 1958.

Midwest School was evacuated and closed for 18 months over a volatile organic compound gas leak from an oil well in 2016. Air quality tests performed by the government concluded 200 times the amount of benzene considered safe for humans was present. Students commuted 42 miles daily to Casper in order to attend classes, taking a toll not only on students but also on the community as a whole, as the school represented the "heart" of the community. The school district was hired an environmental consultant and worked with state and federal health agencies to ensure the return of students would not induce long-term health issues. Students returned to classes at the school in the fall of 2018 after the area was cleared.

== Academics ==
In 2022, the school was rated to have met some standards by the Wyoming Department of Education. The district graduation rate had increased to a seven-year high of 80.3% in 2020-2021. However, both Midwest 3–8 and Midwest High School were listed as falling short of state standards in the 2021-2022 school year in the Natrona County report.

== Athletics ==
High-school level students, the Oilers, compete in the following ts:

- Basketball
- Football
- Golf
- Swimming
- Track
- Volleyball

=== State championships ===
- Football:
  - 1979 (2A)
  - 1991 (1A)
