= Casper Classical Academy =

Public middle school in Casper, Wyoming, US

Coordinates: 42°50′28″N 106°18′00″W

Casper Classical Academy (CCA) is a public middle school in Casper, Wyoming. The school is part of the Natrona County School District.

CCA offers a classical education in a small school setting, with the current principal being Marie Puryear. It was founded in 1996 as an expansion of Fort Caspar Academy and serves about 175 students in grades 6–8. In 2005, CCA received the No Child Left Behind Blue Ribbon School Award, based on standardized state assessment scores.
