= Natrona County High School =

Location
- 930 South Elm Street; Casper, Wyoming 82601; United States

Information
- Type: Public secondary
- Motto: Every Student, Every Chance, Every Day!
- Established: 1896
- School district: Natrona County School District #1
- Principal: Aaron Wilson
- Teaching staff: 108.25 (FTE)
- Grades: 9, 10, 11, 12
- Enrollment: 1,703 (2024–2025)
- Student to teacher ratio: 15.73
- Colors: Black, Orange and white
- Mascot: Mustang
- Website: Natrona County High School
- Natrona County High School
- U.S. National Register of Historic Places
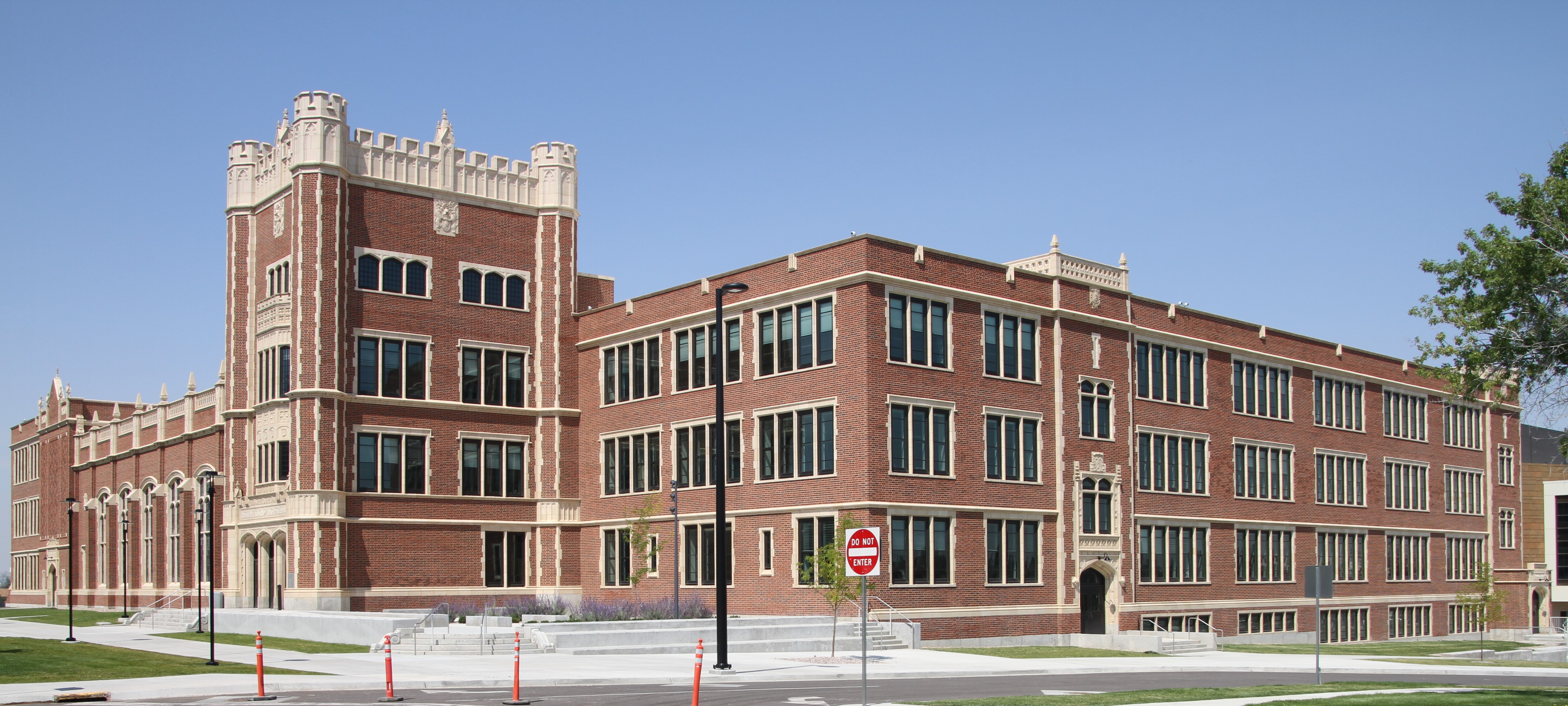

- Location within Wyoming Location within the United States
- Location: 930 South Elm Street, Casper, Wyoming
- Coordinates: 42°50′30″N 106°19′47″W
- Area: 11 acres (4.5 ha)
- Built: 1927
- Architect: Garbutt, Arthur; Weidner, James
- Architectural style: Late Gothic Revival
- NRHP reference No.: 93001491
- Added to NRHP: January 7, 1994

Natrona County High School (NCHS) is a public secondary school (grades 9–12) located in Casper, Wyoming, United States. It serves Natrona County School District #1, which encompasses all of Natrona County, Wyoming.

The school remains a rival of Kelly Walsh High School, one of Casper's other two high schools along with Roosevelt High School. A fourth nearby high school is Midwest School in Midwest, Wyoming.

== History and facilities ==
Natrona County High School was originally known as Casper High School. The current building was constructed between 1924 and 1941 in Collegiate Gothic style. It was partially built under the authority of the Works Progress Administration; the crest of the WPA is visible in the sidewalks on the front campus. In exchange for federal assistance, male student participation in the Junior Reserve Officers' Training Corps was mandatory until a few years after Kelly Walsh High School opened in 1965. The JROTC at NCHS is the second oldest unit in the nation and celebrated its 100th anniversary in 2014.

The International Thespian Society, originally called National Thespians, was founded in 1929 in Fairmont, West Virginia by Dr. Paul Opp, Earnest Bavely, and Harry T. Leeper. It honored high school theater students who participated in their school programs. The first troupe was started by Dr. Earl Blank at Natrona County High School in Casper, Wyoming.

The school's swimming pool was built in 1929, making it the first indoor pool for educational purposes in the state. It was demolished in 2014 during renovations to the building. A new swimming pool was opened up during the 2021 – 2022 school year.

Natrona County High School was the first campus for Casper College, a community college also located in Natrona County Wyoming, which occupied the upper level of NCHS in the late 1940s, before it had a campus of its own.

Natrona County High School was added to the National Register of Historic Places on January 1, 1994.

In 2010–2011 the Natrona County School District began the process of a major re-design to reconfigure the site and renovate the historic building. In early 2012 the state allocated $118 million for the design and construction of the NCHS renovations and expansion. In July 2012 the state released funds for the design, with construction funds to be released in 2013. In August 2012 preliminary concepts for the design of the renovated school were presented to the community by Bassetti Architects.

Dean Kelly resigned as principal in September 2014 after a school district investigation into sexual harassment complaints resulting from a skit performed during hazing and initiation of new teachers before the start of the school year. Kelly did not take part in or directly approve the skit, but took responsibility as the head administrator. Kelly Hornby, executive director for curriculum instruction in Natrona County School District #1, filled the role as Acting Principal following the resignation of Dean Kelly.

Aaron Wilson was hired as the new NCHS Principal at the beginning of the 2021 – 2022 School year following Former Principal Sharon Harris hiring as a superintendent for a school district.

== Academics ==
In addition to standard core curriculum, NCHS offers courses in several areas of academic and technical specialty, including Agriculture, Automotive, DECA, FBLA, FFA, and JROTC. NCHS has offered the IB Diploma Program through the IB World School program since 2001. The program is a comprehensive two-year curriculum for students in grades 11 and 12. Graduates of the program are awarded a high school diploma recognized by universities worldwide.

== Athletics ==
NCHS offers the following athletic programs:

- Alpine skiing – unisex'
- Basketball – boys'
- Basketball – girls'
- Cross country – unisex'
- Football – unisex'
- Golf – unisex'
- Indoor track – boys'
- Indoor track – girls'
- Nordic skiing
- Soccer – boys'
- Soccer – girls'
- Softball – girls'
- Swimming – boys'
- Swimming – girls'
- Tennis – unisex'
- Track – boys'
- Track – girls'
- Volleyball
- Wrestling – boys'
- Wrestling – girls'
- JROTC Drill

=== State championships ===
Boys Cross Country

- Class A 1963, 1979, 1981, 1982
- Class 4A 2010

Girls Cross Country

- Class 4A 1977, 1981, 1982, 1983, 1984, 2018, 2019, 2023

Football

- Class AA 1933, 1937, 1939, 1942, 1948, 1951, 1957, 1963, 1975
- Class 4A 1985, 1996, 1999, 2003, 2010, 2012, 2014, 2018

Boys Golf

- Class AA 1976, 1978, 1981
- Class 4A 1993

Girls Golf

- Class 4A 1987, 1991, 1992, 1993, 1994, 1999, 2004, 2012, 2013

Boys Tennis

- 1973, 1974, 1975, 1977, 1978, 1979, 1997, 1999, 2003, 2005

Girls Tennis

- 1976, 1977, 1978, 2006, 2011, 2012

Volleyball

- Class AA 1976, 1981
- Class 4A 1998, 1999, 2007, 2013

Boys Team Alpine Skiing:

- 1998, 2006, 2007
- Class AA 1960, 1964

Boys Basketball:

- 1939 (Casper)
- Class A (Casper) 1940, 1946, 1949, 1955

== Notable alumni ==
- Taven Bryan, Defensive Tackle for the Cleveland Browns
- Dick Cheney (Class of 1959), 46th Vice President of the United States
- Lynne Cheney (Class of 1959), wife of Dick Cheney
- James A. "Jim" Corbett, co-founder of the Sanctuary movement
- Lance Deal, silver medalist for the hammer throw in the 1996 Summer Olympics in Atlanta, Georgia
- Kenneth S. Deffeyes, petroleum geologist
- Peter Junger, computer law professor
- Mike Lansing, professional baseball player
- Mark Lee, professional baseball player
- Geoffrey Lower, television and movie actor
- Joseph B. Meyer, Wyoming attorney general and state treasurer
- Guy Padgett, Wyoming's first openly gay mayor
- Rev. James Reeb, civil rights activist murdered in Selma, Alabama in 1965
- Marlan O. Scully, physicist known for work in theoretical quantum optics
- Matthew Shepard, murdered near Laramie, Wyoming in 1998
- Floyd Volker, NBA player
- Pete Williams, NBC news correspondent
- Logan Wilson, Linebacker for the Cincinnati Bengals
