= Taven Bryan =

American football player (born 1996)

Profile
- Position: Defensive end

Personal information
- Born: March 11, 1996 (age 30); Casper, Wyoming, U.S.
- Listed height: 6 ft 4 in (1.93 m)
- Listed weight: 291 lb (132 kg)

Career information
- High school: Natrona County (Casper)
- College: Florida (2014–2017)
- NFL draft: 2018: 1st round, 29th overall pick

Career history
- Jacksonville Jaguars (2018–2021); Cleveland Browns (2022); Indianapolis Colts (2023–2024); Cincinnati Bengals (2025)*; Baltimore Ravens (2025)
- * Offseason or practice squad member only

Awards and highlights
- Second-team All-SEC (2017)

Career NFL statistics as of 2025
- Total tackles: 155
- Sacks: 12
- Forced fumbles: 2
- Fumble recoveries: 1
- Pass deflections: 3
- Stats at Pro Football Reference

Taven Coal Bryan (born March 11, 1996) is an American professional football defensive end. He played college football for the Florida Gators and was selected in the first round of the 2018 NFL draft by the Jacksonville Jaguars. He has also played for the Cleveland Browns and Indianapolis Colts.

== Early life ==
Bryan attended Natrona County High School in Casper, Wyoming, where he played high school football. He was the top-ranked football recruit in Wyoming in the class of 2014. He committed to the University of Florida to play college football.

== College career ==
Bryan played at Florida from 2014 to 2017. During his career he had 65 tackles, four sacks, and one interception. After his junior season in 2017, Bryan decided to forgo his senior year and enter the 2018 NFL draft.

== Professional career ==
Pre-draft measurables
Height	Weight	Arm length	Hand span	Wingspan	40-yard dash	10-yard split	20-yard split	20-yard shuttle	Three-cone drill	Vertical jump	Broad jump	Bench press
6 ft 5 in (1.96 m)	291 lb (132 kg)	32 3/4 in (0.83 m)	9 3/4 in (0.25 m)	6 ft 6 7/8 in (2.00 m)	4.98 s	1.68 s	2.88 s	4.48 s	7.12 s	35 in (0.89 m)	9 ft 11 in (3.02 m)	30 reps
All values from NFL Combine

=== Jacksonville Jaguars ===
Bryan was selected by the Jacksonville Jaguars in the first round (29th overall) of the 2018 NFL draft. On July 17, 2018, Bryan signed a four-year, $10.2 million contract with the Jaguars.

The Jaguars declined to exercise the fifth-year option on Bryan's contract on May 3, 2021, making him a free agent after the 2021 season.

=== Cleveland Browns ===
On March 16, 2022, Bryan signed a one-year contract with the Cleveland Browns. He started 16 games in 2022, recording 26 tackles and three sacks.

=== Indianapolis Colts ===
On March 17, 2023, Bryan signed a one-year contract with the Indianapolis Colts. He played in all 17 games with seven starts, recording 22 tackles, two sacks, and a forced fumble.

Bryan re-signed with the Colts on March 26, 2024.

=== Cincinnati Bengals ===
On July 20, 2025, Bryan signed with the Cincinnati Bengals. He was released on August 25.

=== Baltimore Ravens ===
On September 24, 2025, Bryan signed with the Baltimore Ravens' practice squad. He was promoted to the active roster on November 15. Bryan was placed on injured reserve on November 27, due to an ankle injury suffered in Week 12 against the New York Jets.

== NFL career statistics ==
Legend
**Bold**	Career high

=== Regular season ===
Year	Team	Games		Tackles						Interceptions						Fumbles			
Year	Team	GP	GS	Cmb	Solo	Ast	Sck	TFL	QBHits	PD	Int	Yds	Avg	Lng	TD	FF	FR	Yds	TD
2018	JAX	16	1	20	13	7	1.0	3	2	0	0	0	0.0	0	0	0	0	0	0
2019	JAX	16	8	**33**	**18**	**15**	2.0	**5**	**9**	**1**	0	0	0.0	0	0	**1**	0	0	0
2020	JAX	16	8	18	10	8	0.5	3	6	0	0	0	0.0	0	0	0	0	0	0
2021	JAX	15	0	15	10	5	2.0	4	8	0	0	0	0.0	0	0	0	0	0	0
2022	CLE	16	**16**	26	11	**15**	**3.0**	2	6	**1**	0	0	0.0	0	0	0	0	0	0
2023	IND	**17**	7	22	12	10	2.0	4	1	0	0	0	0.0	0	0	**1**	0	0	0
2024	IND	14	6	17	10	7	1.0	3	2	0	0	0	0.0	0	0	0	0	0	0
Career		110	46	151	84	67	11.5	24	34	2	0	0	0.0	0	0	2	0	0	0
