= Pete Williams (journalist) =

American journalist

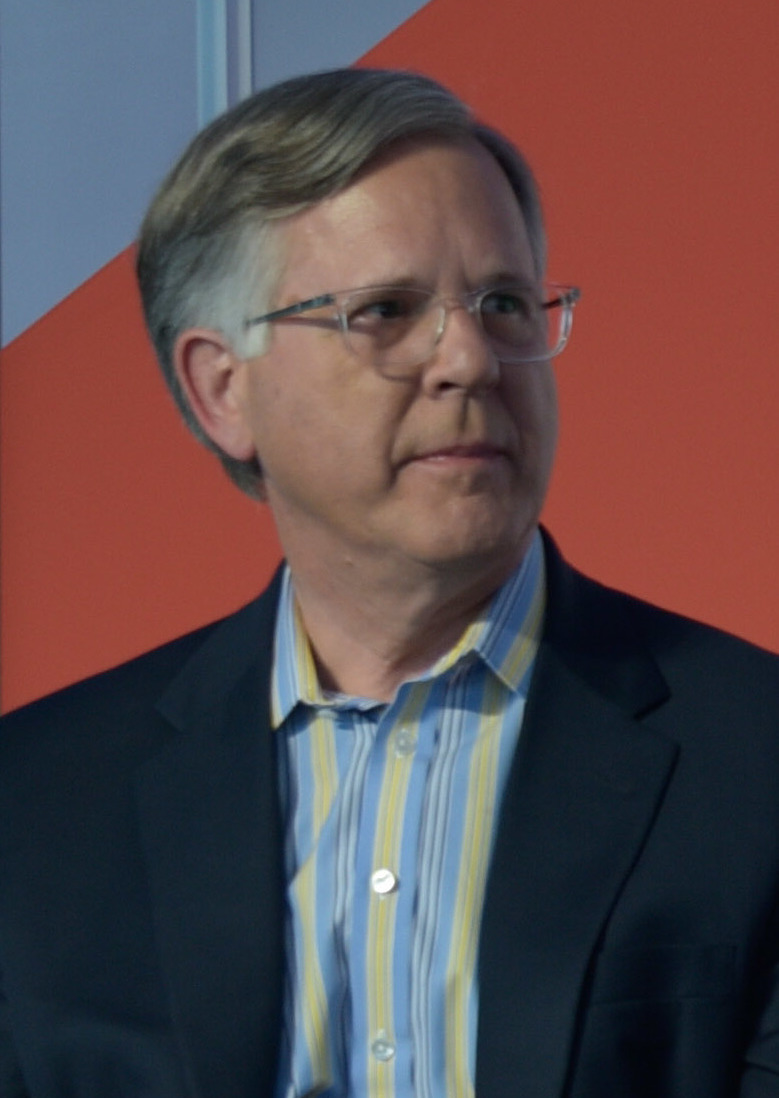
- Williams at the 2017 Aspen Security Forum

Assistant Secretary of Defense for Public Affairs
- In office May 22, 1989 – January 20, 1993
- Nominated by: George H. W. Bush
- Preceded by: J. Daniel Howard
- Succeeded by: Vernon A. Guidry Jr.

Personal details
- Born: Louis Alan Williams; February 28, 1952 (age 74) Casper, Wyoming, U.S.
- Education: Stanford University (BA)
- Occupation: Journalist, spokesperson

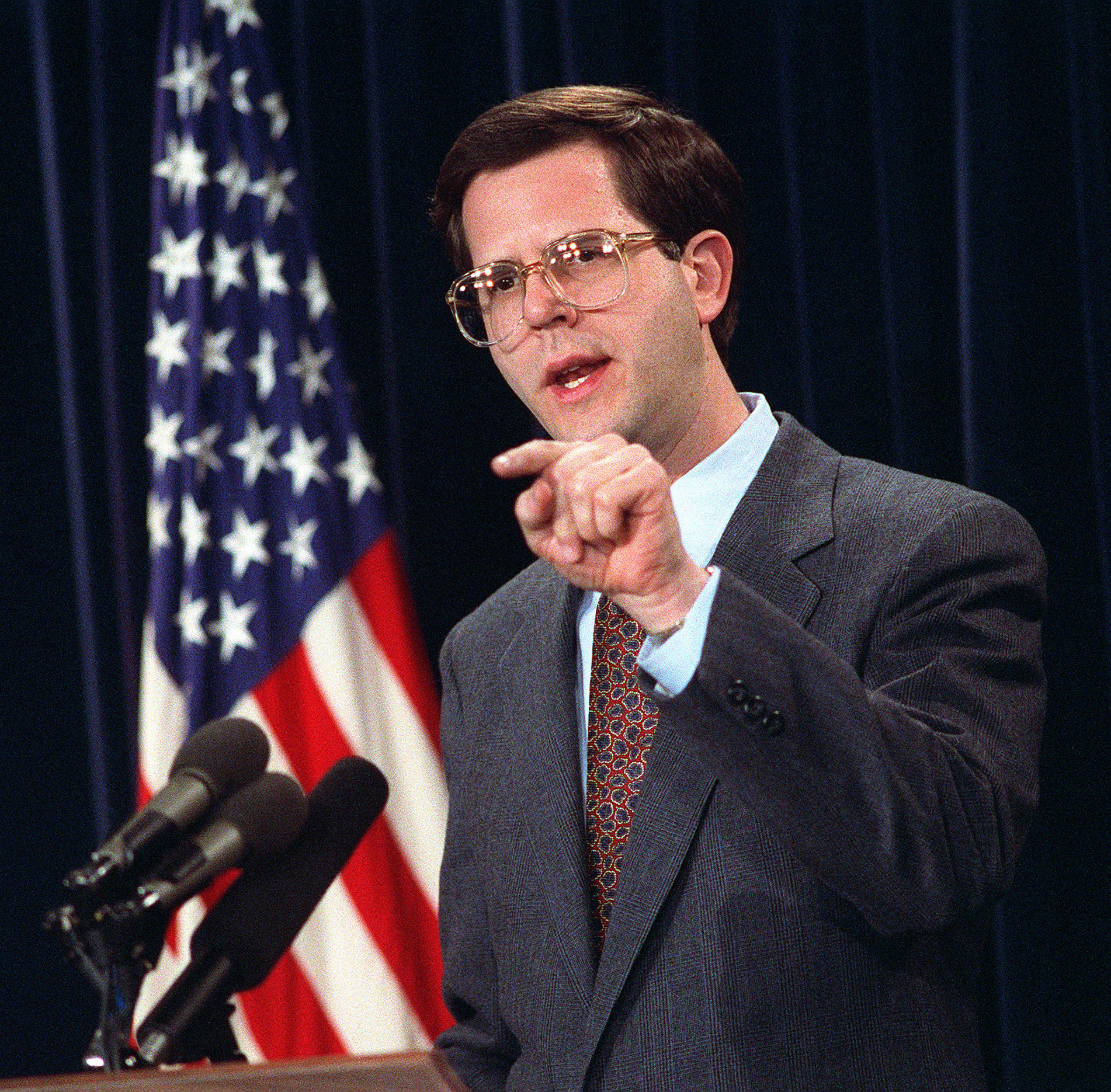
Pete Williams as Assistant Secretary of Defense for Public Affairs at a press briefing, 1991

Louis Alan "Pete" Williams (born February 28, 1952) is a retired American journalist and former government official. From 1993 to 2022, he was a television correspondent for NBC News. He served in the administration of President George H. W. Bush.

Williams was raised in Casper, Wyoming, where his mother was a realtor and his father was an orthodontist. "Pete" is a nickname he has used since childhood. After he graduated from Stanford University, where he had originally studied engineering but subsequently changed to journalism, he began his career in local news with the Casper, Wyoming, television station KTWO and its eponymous radio station in 1974.

In 1986, Williams became press secretary for U.S. Representative Dick Cheney and followed Cheney to the United States Department of Defense as Cheney became United States Secretary of Defense to be the Assistant Secretary of Defense for Public Affairs in 1989 during the George H. W. Bush administration.

Williams became a correspondent for NBC News in late March 1993, after leaving the Defense Department. His main areas of news coverage for NBC included the Department of Justice and Supreme Court. He retired from NBC News on July 29, 2022.

== Early life and education ==
Pete Williams was born and raised in Casper, Wyoming, where his mother, "Bennie," was a teacher and later a realtor, and his father, Louis, was a dentist. He was one of three children. Williams graduated from Natrona County High School—coincidentally, the same high school as his fellow Bush administration alumnus Dick Cheney—in 1970. He was a member of his high school's award-winning debating team, and also won an award for public speaking. He was also active in his school's Teenage Republicans club, and a member of the National Honor Society.

Williams graduated from Stanford University in 1974. While at Stanford, he studied Journalism and History, and spent a year studying in London in a Stanford-sponsored overseas program.

== Career ==
=== Early journalism career ===
From 1974 to 1985, Williams was a reporter and news director for the Casper-based KTWO television and KTWO radio stations. Williams also served as director for the Wyoming Future Project from 1985 to 1986.

=== Press secretary ===
In 1986, Williams was hired as press secretary and legislative assistant on the staff of U.S. Representative Dick Cheney. Williams was appointed Assistant Secretary of Defense for Public Affairs in 1989, following Cheney's nomination as United States Secretary of Defense and worked as press secretary of the Defense Department.

While serving as a Pentagon spokesperson, he was accused of allegedly working to cover up the large-scale irregular military activities that had occurred during the US invasion of Panama under the pretense of apprehending Panamanian dictator Manuel Noriega, which was later featured in the documentary film The Panama Deception (1992).

=== Later journalism career ===
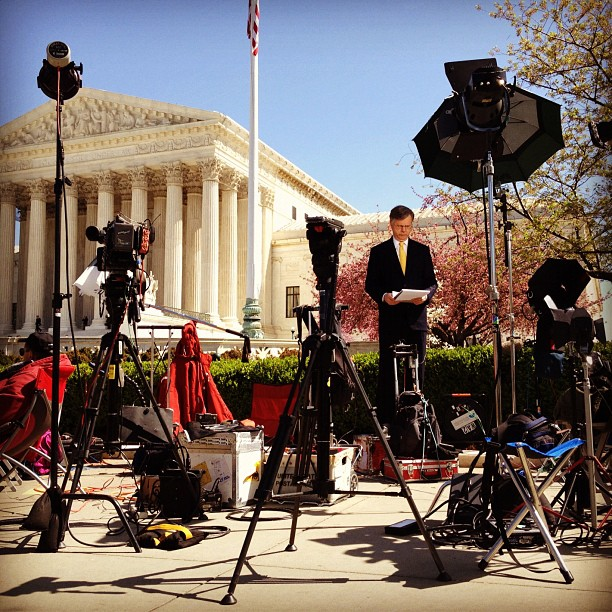
Williams prepares a report in front of the Supreme Court of the United States in 2012.

Williams was outed as gay in 1991 by journalist and activist Michelangelo Signorile. When pressed by reporters, Cheney refused to dismiss Williams (a civilian employee) despite the department's then-ban on LGBTQ members of the military. Cheney also implied his opposition to the ban.

NBC News hired Williams in March 1993 as justice correspondent based in Washington, D. C., to cover news from the U.S. Department of Justice and the U.S. Supreme Court.

During the Bosnian War, Williams initially denied that there was any evidence of genocide or war crimes, claiming that "we do not see evidence of a program of systematic or massive killing of innocent people". A video clip of the actual statement is featured in the 1997 film Welcome to Sarajevo.

As NBC justice correspondent, Williams has interviewed United States Attorneys General John Ashcroft, Alberto Gonzales, and Eric Holder, as well as FBI Director Christopher Wray.

In covering the Boston Marathon bombing for MSNBC and NBC News, Williams earned praise from various media analysts for choosing to report events in a restrained, cautionary fashion. In contrast with the Associated Press and CNN, Williams refused to report a later-retracted claim that the Federal Bureau of Investigation had arrested a suspect for the bombing. For Politico, Dylan Byers commented: "On a major story that has been defined by inaccurate and conflicting reports and wild speculation, Williams has been calm, diligent and correct." Brian Resnick of the National Journal wrote that Williams showed "restraint in not jumping too far into conclusions." The phrase "NBC's Pete Williams" became a trending topic in the overnight hours of April 19, 2013.

In covering the April 2021 United States Capitol car attack, Pete Williams claimed the assailant was a "White Man" before any knowledge of the driver was released by authorities. He did not retract his statement. "The question now is, what's the condition of the Capitol Police officers who were injured when the man -- we're told it was a White male that was driving the car -- when the man got out of the car and attacked the police officers with a knife," Williams told MSNBC anchor Katy Tur. The assailant turned out to be Noah Green, a mentally ill Black man who was a self-described "follower of [Louis] Farrakhan".

Williams announced his retirement on Friday, July 29, 2022, during the Today Show.

== Post-career ==
Williams delivered a eulogy for former Vice President Dick Cheney at his memorial service on November 20, 2025.

=== Awards ===
Williams has received three national news Emmy awards.

In 2012, the University of Wyoming awarded Williams an honorary Doctor of Letters, in recognition of his many contributions to journalism. He was praised for his "sound judgment, fair mindedness, impeccable ethics, and dedication to service."

Williams was named the recipient of the 2018 John F. Hogan Award, presented annually by the Radio Television Digital News Association (RTDNA). The Hogan Award, named after the association's first president, is given in recognition of "an individual's contributions to the journalism profession and freedom of the press..." Williams was chosen because "...Over the course of his distinguished career, Pete Williams has served the public first as a government spokesman and then, for the last 25 years, as a reporter covering government," said Scott Libin, current Chair of RTDNA. "His insight and understanding of power and politics have proven hugely valuable to the viewers of NBC News."
