= Kelly Walsh High School =

Coordinates: 42°50′24.34″N 106°16′42.69″W

Location
- 3500 East 12th Street; Casper, Wyoming 82609; United States

Information
- Type: Public secondary
- Motto: ‘’Preparing All Students For Their Next Step.’’
- Established: 1965
- School district: Natrona County School District No. 1
- Principal: Mike Britt
- Teaching staff: 126.87 (FTE)
- Grades: 9–12
- Enrollment: 2,073 (2023–2024)
- Student to teacher ratio: 16.34
- Colors: Green and White
- Mascot: Trojan

Kelly Walsh High School is a public secondary institution (grades 9-12) located in Casper, Wyoming, United States. It is in Natrona County School District No. 1. The school mascot is the Trojan. The current principal is Mike Britt.

== History ==
Kelly Walsh High School, which was named after a principal of Natrona County High School, opened in 1965. Several subsequent expansion and remodeling projects have been completed, including a near-total remodel of the school in 2017.

The school started offering instruction to students in grades 10–12 only and continued that for nearly 38 years. During the 2003–04 school year, Kelly Walsh began offering classes for students in the ninth grade.

During the 1989–90 school year, Kelly Walsh had to be closed for asbestos removal. During this closure, classes were held across town at Natrona County High School. Classes for Natrona County High School students were held in the morning, while classes for Kelly Walsh High School students were held in the afternoon. Kelly Walsh High School partially reopened for classes during the fall of 1990, and it opened completely after the Christmas break in January 1991.

== Academics ==
Kelly Walsh has scored above the state average in every standardized test subject. The student to teacher ratio is 17:1, slightly above the state ratio of 14:1.

== Athletics ==
Kelly Walsh has won several state championships and has produced many outstanding athletes. Recent championships include the 2005 4A girls' volleyball, 2005 4A boys' and girls' soccer, 2002 girls' Nordic skiing, and 2002 4A girls' track and field. In 2007, the Trojans were state champions in 4A boys' soccer and 4A girls' tennis. More recently, the Kelly Walsh 4A Girls golf team won the local Tin Cup in 2016, 2017, and 2018 while their boys placed first in 2017, 2018, and 2019. Kelly Walsh has also produced many Gatorade Players of the Year, including Amanda Hopper (2002–03 track and field), Devon Crotteau (2005–2006 volleyball), Chris Moberly (2005–2006 football), Eric Platt (2005–2006 basketball), Ashley (Klone) Ullrich (2005–2006 girls' soccer), Jason Boness twice (1996–97, 1997–98 track and field), Madison Vinich (2017-2018 Volleyball), and Danilynn Schell (2018-19 & 2019-20 in Volleyball). In 2008 the boys' basketball team was runner-up in state basketball, coming in second to Natrona County High School.

Each May, the school's Harry Geldien Stadium plays host to the Wyoming State High School Track and Field Championships. During this three-day event, high schools from around Wyoming send their best athletes to compete for top honors in many track field events.

On January 20, 2018, it was reported that on January 3, 2018, a serious hazing incident was carried out by senior members of the school wrestling team against a freshman member. "A group of Kelly Walsh High School wrestlers allegedly held down and waterboarded a freshman teammate earlier this month in the school’s locker room, according to two people close to the victim’s family." The incident is currently being investigated by the school board and the police.

== Activities ==
Kelly Walsh is notorious for their high budget winter theater productions such as Into the Woods or Newsies.

== Notable alumni ==
- C. J. Box – bestselling mystery writer
- Mike Devereaux – former Major League Baseball player
- Ron Franscell – bestselling author and journalist
- Kristen Heiss – US National Team swimmer; 2008 US Olympic swimming trials finalist
- M. Margaret McKeown – Judge, Ninth Circuit Court of Appeals
