= Edgerton, Wyoming =

Town in Natrona County, Wyoming, United States

- Town
- Location of Edgerton in Natrona County, Wyoming
- Coordinates: 43°24′49″N 106°14′55″W
- Country: United States
- State: Wyoming
- County: Natrona

Area
  - Total: 0.30 sq mi (0.77 km^{2})
  - Land: 0.30 sq mi (0.77 km^{2})
  - Water: 0 sq mi (0.00 km^{2})
- Elevation: 4,898 ft (1,493 m)

Population (2020)
  - Total: 153
  - Density: 683.5/sq mi (263.91/km^{2})
- Time zone: UTC-7 (Mountain (MST))
  - Summer (DST): UTC-6 (MDT)
- ZIP code: 82635
- Area code: 307
- FIPS code: 56-23155
- GNIS feature ID: 2412466
- Website: www.townofedgertonwy.com

Edgerton is a town in Natrona County, Wyoming, United States. As of the 2020 census, Edgerton had a population of 153. It is part of the Casper, Wyoming Metropolitan Statistical Area.

== History ==
Edgerton is at the edge of the Salt Creek Oil Field. Only people who worked directly for one of the oil companies could live on the field. The town of Edgerton was created for the businesses and people needed to support the oil field.

The town was incorporated in 1925.

Edgerton has developed close ties with Midwest, a town two miles west. The two share a school and water system. In 2024 the mayor was considering sharing a police force.

== Geography ==
According to the United States Census Bureau, the town has a total area of 0.25 square miles (0.65 km^{2}), all land.

== Demographics ==
Historical population
Census	Pop.	Note	%±
1930	269		—
1940	232		−13.8%
1950	203		−12.5%
1960	512		152.2%
1970	350		−31.6%
1980	510		45.7%
1990	247		−51.6%
2000	169		−31.6%
2010	195		15.4%
2020	153		−21.5%
U.S. Decennial Census

=== 2010 census ===
As of the census of 2010, there were 195 people, 90 households, and 48 families living in the town. The population density was 780.0 inhabitants per square mile (301.2/km^{2}). There were 111 housing units at an average density of 444.0 per square mile (171.4/km^{2}). The racial makeup of the town was 94.4% White, 0.5% African American, 0.5% Native American, and 4.6% from two or more races. Hispanic or Latino of any race were 5.6% of the population.

There were 90 households, of which 20.0% had children under the age of 18 living with them, 40.0% were married couples living together, 12.2% had a female householder with no husband present, 1.1% had a male householder with no wife present, and 46.7% were non-families. 40.0% of all households were made up of individuals, and 15.5% had someone living alone who was 65 years of age or older. The average household size was 2.17 and the average family size was 2.85.

The median age in the town was 49.1 years. 17.9% of residents were under the age of 18; 7.7% were between the ages of 18 and 24; 19% were from 25 to 44; 39.5% were from 45 to 64; and 15.9% were 65 years of age or older. The gender makeup of the town was 55.9% male and 44.1% female.

=== 2000 census ===
As of the census of 2000, there were 169 people, 74 households, and 44 families living in the town. The population density was 655.4 people per square mile (251.0/km^{2}). There were 119 housing units at an average density of 461.5 per square mile (176.7/km^{2}). The racial makeup of the town was 96.45% White, 0.59% Native American, 1.18% from other races, and 1.78% from two or more races. Hispanic or Latino of any race were 1.18% of the population.

There were 74 households, out of which 27.0% had children under the age of 18 living with them, 51.4% were married couples living together, 8.1% had a female householder with no husband present, and 39.2% were non-families. 36.5% of all households were made up of individuals, and 8.1% had someone living alone who was 65 years of age or older. The average household size was 2.28 and the average family size was 2.96.

In the town, the population was spread out, with 23.7% under the age of 18, 4.7% from 18 to 24, 24.3% from 25 to 44, 36.1% from 45 to 64, and 11.2% who were 65 years of age or older. The median age was 43 years. For every 100 females, there were 119.5 males. For every 100 females age 18 and over, there were 118.6 males.

The median income for a household in the town was $28,750, and the median income for a family was $33,750. Males had a median income of $24,583 versus $14,375 for females. The per capita income for the town was $14,332. About 10.7% of families and 18.2% of the population were below the poverty line, including 9.1% of those under the age of eighteen and none of those 65 or over.

== Government ==
Edgerton has a mayor and city council. There are four council members.

Victor Paul Brow was elected mayor in 2024. Brow was serving as interim mayor after the resignation of H.H. "Buck" King in September 2023. King was mayor for nearly twenty years.

== Education ==
Public education in the town of Edgerton is provided by Natrona County School District #1.

Edgerton has a public library, a branch of the Natrona County Public Library System.

== See also ==
- List of municipalities in Wyoming
