= Ron Franscell =

American journalist (born 1957)

- Born: January 29, 1957 (age 69)
- Occupations: Author, journalist
- Spouse: Mary Franscell
- Children: 2
- Writing career
- Period: 1995–present
- Genres: Mystery fiction, crime
- Website: www.ronfranscell.com

Ron Franscell (born January 29, 1957) is an American journalist, novelist and true crime writer best known for the true account The Darkest Night about the 1973 crimes against two childhood friends in the small community where Franscell grew up.

== Personal life ==
Franscell was raised in Casper, Wyoming, where he attended Kelly Walsh High School. He attended the US Naval Academy in Annapolis and later Casper College, where he was editor of the school newspaper (The Chinook). He graduated with a bachelor's degree in journalism from the University of Wyoming in 1979.

Franscell and his wife live in Placitas, Sandoval County, New Mexico. His wife, Mary Franscell, is a high school English teacher. He has two children.

== Career ==
He worked as a journalist in Wyoming, New Mexico and California for Gannett newspapers from 1983 to 1989 and is a past president of the Wyoming Press Association.

When Hurricane Rita made landfall in Texas, Franscell, managing editor at the time for the Beaumont Enterprise, rode out the storm with staff members in the newspaper's building.

In 2001, he was hired as a senior writer and columnist to write about the American West by the Denver Post, where he stayed two years. Following 9/11, he went on assignment for the Post to the Middle East. He worked for the Hearst Corporation from 2004 to 2008.

He was a judge for Knight Ridder newspaper's Top Books of 2003 and the International Association of Crime Writers Hammett Prize in 2017.

In 2008, the book Fall: The Rape and Murder of Innocence in a Small Town, Franscell's book about a crime against two young girls who were his next-door neighbors in Wyoming, was republished by St. Martin's Press with the new title The Darkest Night.

His book Delivered From Evil, for which he interviewed survivors of notorious mass killings in America, was released in January 2011. After the assassination attempt near Tucson, Arizona the same month of U.S. Representative Gabrielle Giffords', when 18 other people were shot, six of whom died, Franscell was asked to comment for media outlets about mass murders.

True Crime Zine gave Franscell's ninth book, The Crime Buff's Guide to Outlaw Washington, DC released by Globe Pequot Press in September 2012, a five-star review. The Huffington Post reviewed The Sourtoe Cocktail Club, about a father-and-son road trip before Franscell's son Matt left for college.

Franscell's The Crime Buff's Guide to Outlaw Pennsylvania was released by Globe Pequot in October 2013.

== Awards ==
In 2017, the true-crime book, Morgue: A Life in Death, was nominated for an Edgar award by the Mystery Writers of America. In 1995, Franscell was awarded the national Freedom of Information Award from the Associated Press Managing Editors Association.

He was awarded the 1996 Wyoming Literary Fellowship for his first novel Angel Fire. In 1999, Angel Fire was named in the San Francisco Chronicle's 100 Best Novels of the 20th Century West.

In 2003, he was awarded the Distinguished Alumni Award by Casper College and in 2026 was inducted into Casper-Kelly Walsh High School's Order of Troy (distinguished alumni).

"The Darkest Night," a New York Times bestseller, won ForeWord Reviews magazine's gold medal for 2007 Book of the Year in true crime.

== Books ==
=== Fiction ===
- Deep End (2026) (978-1977288707)
- Deaf Row (2023) (ISBN 978-1-957288-55-0)
- The Obituary: A Winchester Bullet Mystery (2003) WildBlue Press (ISBN 1942266030)
- The Deadline: A Winchester Bullet Mystery (1999) Write Way Publishing. (ISBN 1885173733)
- Angel Fire: A novel (1998), Laughing Owl Publishing (Reissue: Berkley/Penguin Putnam 2000). (ISBN 0965970124)

=== Non-fiction ===
- ShadowMan: An Elusive Psycho Killer and the Birth of FBI Profiling (2022) Berkley/Penguin-Random House (ISBN 0593199278)
- Alice & Gerald: A Homicidal Love Story (2019) Prometheus Books (ISBN 978-1633885127)
- Morgue: A Life in Death (2016) St. Martin's Press (ISBN 978-1250067142)
- Southern Fried Crime (2015), Notorious USA
- Evil at the Front Door (Notorious Louisiana) (2014), Notorious USA
- Nightmare at Noon (Notorious Texas) (2015), Notorious USA
- Delivered From Evil: True Stories of People Who Faced Monsters and Survived (2011), Fair Winds Press (ISBN 1592334407)
- The Sourtoe Cocktail Club: The Yukon Odyssey of a Father and a Son in Search of a Mummified Human Toe ... and Everything Else (2011), Globe Pequot Press (ISBN 978-0762771561)
- The Darkest Night: Two Sisters, a Brutal Murder, and the Loss of Innocence in a Small Town (2008), St. Martin's Press. (ISBN 0312948468). Originally titled in hardback, "Fall: The Rape and Murder of Innocence in a Small Town" (2007), New Horizon Press (ISBN 0882822799)
- The Crime Buff's Guide to Outlaw Texas (2010), Globe Pequot Press (ISBN 978-0762759651)
- The Crime Buff's Guide to the Outlaw Rockies (2011), Globe Pequot Press (ISBN 978-0762771639)
- The Crime Buff's Guide to Outlaw Washington, DC (2012), Globe Pequot Press (ISBN 978-0762773855)
- The Crime Buff's Guide to Outlaw Pennsylvania (2013), Globe Pequot Press (ISBN 978-0762788330)
- The Crime Buff's Guide to Outlaw Arizona (2014), Angel Fire Press (ISBN 978-0692026823)
- The Crime Buff's Guide to Outlaw New Mexico (2014), Angel Fire Press (ISBN 978-0692026816)
- The Crime Buff's Guide to Outlaw Southwest (2014), Angel Fire Press (ISBN 978-0692218471)
- The Crime Buff's Guide to Outlaw Los Angeles (2017), WildBlue Press
