= Wyoming High School Activities Association =

Organization

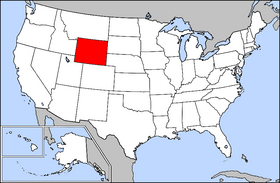
- Abbreviation: WHSAA
- Formation: 1920s
- Type: Volunteer; NPO
- Legal status: Association
- Purpose: Athletic/Educational
- Headquarters: 6571 East 2nd Street; Casper, WY 82609
- Region served: Wyoming
- Members: 73 high schools
- Commissioner: Trevor Wilson
- Affiliations: National Federation of State High School Associations
- Staff: 6
- Website: whsaa.org

The Wyoming High School Activities Association (WHSAA) is the organization that runs and regulates all interscholastic high school activities in the U.S. state of Wyoming. The WHSAA was founded in the 1920s to regulate athletic competition between Wyoming's high schools. The organization has since grown to assist other interscholastic activities such as drama and music.

== Sanctioned sports ==
=== Fall sports ===
- Cross country
- Football
- Girls swimming and diving
- Golf
- Tennis
- Volleyball

=== Winter sports ===
- Alpine skiing
- Basketball
- Boys swimming and diving
- Indoor track and field
- Nordic skiing
- Wrestling

=== Spring sports ===
- Golf
- Soccer
- Softball
- Tennis
- Track and field

== Sanctioned non-athletic activities ==
- All state music
- Art
- DECA
- Future Business Leaders of America
- FCCLA
- FFA
- Journalism
- Marching band
- Music
- Speech
- Spirit
- Student Council
- Thespian Festival
