= Roosevelt High School (Wyoming) =

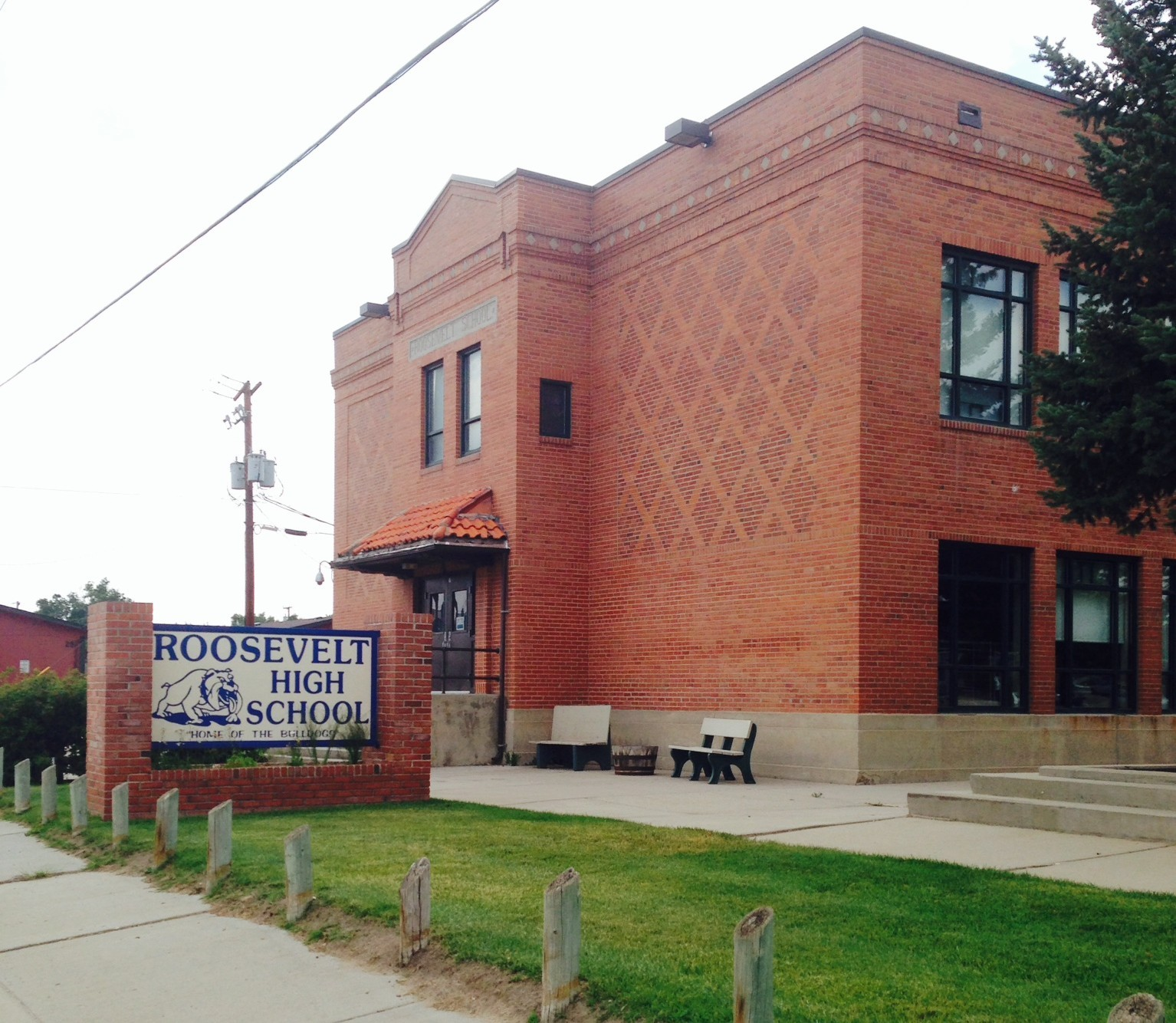

Location
- 3000 Independence Court; Casper, Wyoming 82604; United States; 42°51′41″N 106°19′26″W

Information
- School district: Natrona County School District Number 1
- CEEB code: 510062
- NCES School ID: 560451000256
- Principal: Bryan Honken (interim)
- Teaching staff: 17.00 (FTE)
- Enrollment: 223 (2023-2024)
- Student to teacher ratio: 13.12
- Website: www.natronaschools.org/apps/pages/index.jsp?uREC_ID=2049162&type=d&pREC_ID=2117997

Roosevelt High School is a public school in the Natrona County School District in Casper, Wyoming, United States. It is an alternative high school that provides small classes, credit recovery, and college courses for students in grades nine through twelve. About 200 students attend the school.

Its teachers have won awards. Its athletes have also been recognized.

== History ==
The school was originally built in 1922 and named "North Casper School", later being renamed Roosevelt School in honor of Theodore Roosevelt. It was later converted into an alternative high school. That building, Roosevelt School (Casper, Wyoming), is now a historic building listed on the National Register of Historic Places. The high school moved into a new building in 2016.
