= Natrona County School District Number 1 =

Public school district in Wyoming, USA

The Natrona County School District #1 is a public school district, serving students in Natrona County, Wyoming, United States. Based in Casper, Wyoming, the district includes the entire county, and also serves the towns and communities of Alcova, Edgerton, Evansville, Midwest, Mills, Powder River, and Willow Creek.

== Governance ==
The Natrona County School District is governed by a publicly elected board of trustees. Members are elected at-large by county voters to staggered, four-year terms. School elections are held biannually in November. The school board hires a superintendent to oversee the day-to-day operations of the district. Current superintendent Mike Jennings was hired in July 2020 and is set to retire in July 2024. The school board has selected current Associate Superintendent Angela Hensley to be the next superintendent, which she will assume in July 2024.

Internally, NCSD operates under a shared governance model called the Compact. Established in 2001 following a round of contentious contract negotiations, the NCSD Compact is an agreement between the board of trustees, the Natrona County Education Association (NCEA), the Natrona County Association of Education Support Staff (NCAESS), and the Service Employees Independent Organization (SEIO). The agreement structures decision-making models in the district to ensure that all major decisions impacting students, as well as contract and salary/benefit decisions, are made through a consensus process.

== Schools ==
Park Elementary School	Casper Classical Academy	Crest Hill Elementary School
Pineview Elementary School	Centennial Middle School	Cottonwood Elementary School
Red Creek Elementary School	Cy Middle School	Evansville Elementary School
Sagewood Elementary School	Dean Morgan Middle School	Fort Caspar Academy
Southridge Elementary School	Kelly Walsh High School	
Journey Elementary School	Summit Elementary School	Natrona County High School
Lincoln Elementary School	Verda James Elementary School	Roosevelt High School
Manor Heights Elementary School	Poison Spider School	Oregon Trail Elementary School
Midwest Schools	Paradise Valley Elementary School	

== Safety programs ==
The Safe Schools Suspension Lab is a program that provides a safe, supervised alternative to at-home suspension for students whose behavior requires them to be removed from the traditional classroom.

In 2009, the school district made national news when it approved an anti-bullying policy that specifically prohibits cyberbullying and sexting.

== Capital construction ==
School capital construction and major maintenance in Wyoming is funded through the state's School Facilities Commission, which was formed in response to a Wyoming Supreme Court ruling that holds the state responsible for equitable school facilities. Funded primarily through coal royalties, the SFC provides funding to upgrade and replace existing school facilities based on need and to build new facilities based on population.

In the Natrona County School District, this system has led to a number of recent capital construction projects:

- A new facility for Fort Caspar Academy, opened in 2008.
- A remodel of the former Fairdale Elementary School site to provide a new facility for Star Lane Center.
- A remodel of the Central Services Facility to provide space for the Back on Track and Safe Schools Suspension Lab programs.
- A new facility for Cottonwood Elementary School, opened in January 2009.
- A new Poison Spider School facility, opened in Spring 2009.
- A new CY Middle School facility, opened in 2010.
- A new elementary school, opened in 2010.

=== Secondary systems transformation ===
The Natrona County School District transformed its secondary education system and defined a comprehensive secondary education platform which includes grades six through 12.

Work on Natrona County High School and Kelly Walsh High School to expand facilities began in 2014. At NCHS a restoration and remodel of the historic building is planned along with construction of new additions. The KWHS building is being replaced with new construction on the same site. These improvements will accommodate the additional students in the buildings due to switching to 9th-12th grade high schools.

In addition, the district has recognized a need to better serve 21st-century students. District and community officials are concerned about a high drop-out rate throughout the district, as well as a high disengagement rate among students.

== Student Demographics ==
The following figures are as of October 1, 2009.

- Total district enrollment: 11,729
- Student enrollment by gender
  - Male: 6,058 (51.65%)
  - Female: 5,671 (48.35%)
- Student enrollment by ethnicity
  - American Indian or Alaska Native: 119 (1.01%)
  - Asian: 101 (0.86%)
  - Black or African American: 219 (1.87%)
  - Hispanic or Latino: 937 (7.99%)
  - Native Hawaiian or other Pacific Islander: 9 (0.08%)
  - Two or more races: 49 (0.42%)
  - White: 10,295 (87.77%)
