= Wright, Wyoming =

- Town
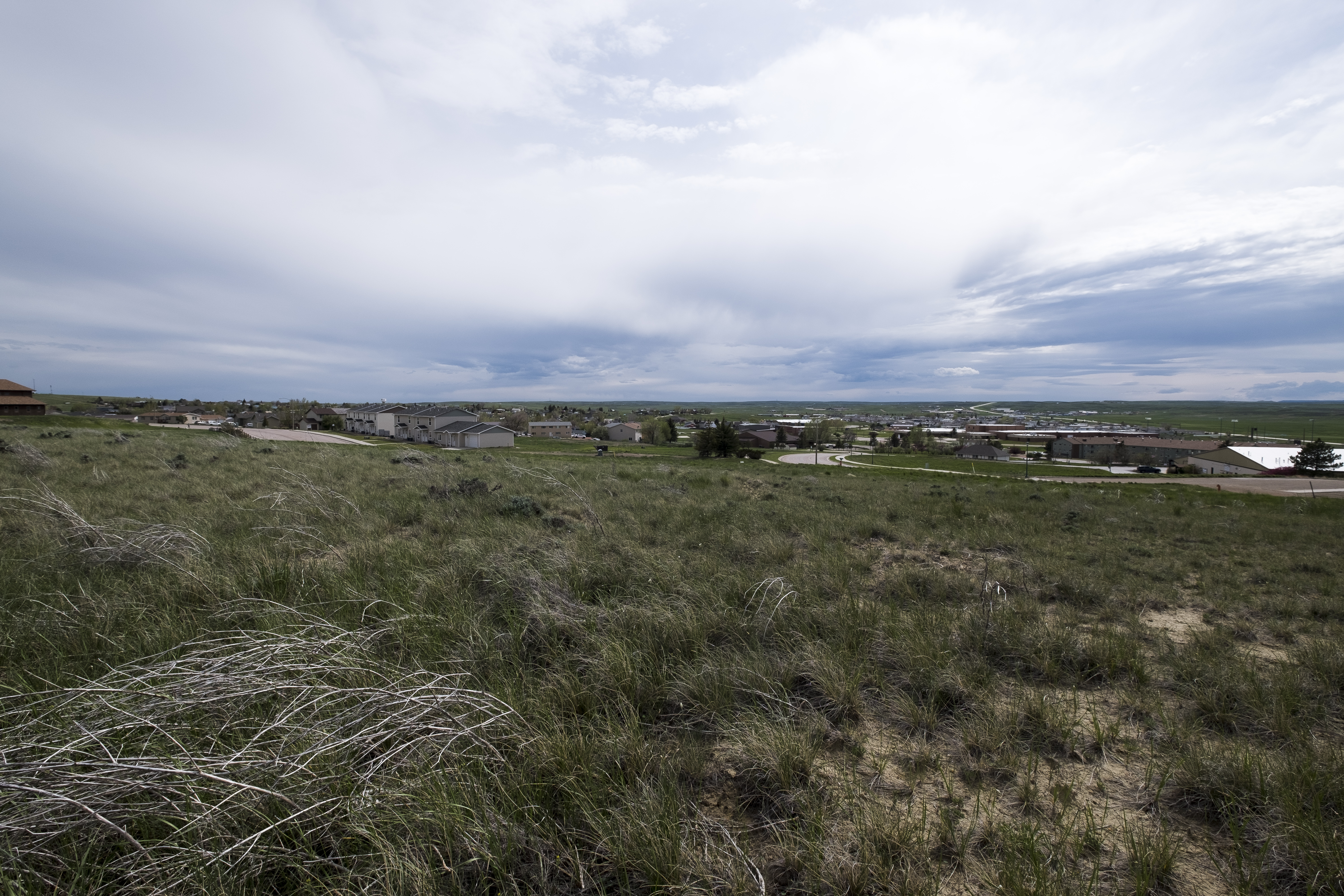
- Overlooking Wright from the Northeast

- Logo
- Mottoes: "Wright Time... Wright Community...Wright Now!" "Energy, Community, Opportunity"
- Location of Wright in Campbell County, Wyoming.
- Coordinates: 43°45′06″N 105°29′46″W
- Country: United States
- State: Wyoming
- County: Campbell

Area
  - Total: 2.85 sq mi (7.39 km^{2})
  - Land: 2.85 sq mi (7.39 km^{2})
  - Water: 0 sq mi (0.00 km^{2})
- Elevation: 5,122 ft (1,561 m)

Population (2020)
  - Total: 1,644
  - Density: 614.5/sq mi (237.27/km^{2})
- Time zone: UTC-7 (Mountain (MST))
  - Summer (DST): UTC-6 (MDT)
- ZIP code: 82732
- Area code: 307
- FIPS code: 56-85015
- GNIS feature ID: 2413513
- Website: Town of Wright Wyoming

Wright is a town in Campbell County, Wyoming, United States. The population was 1,644 at the 2020 census.

== History ==
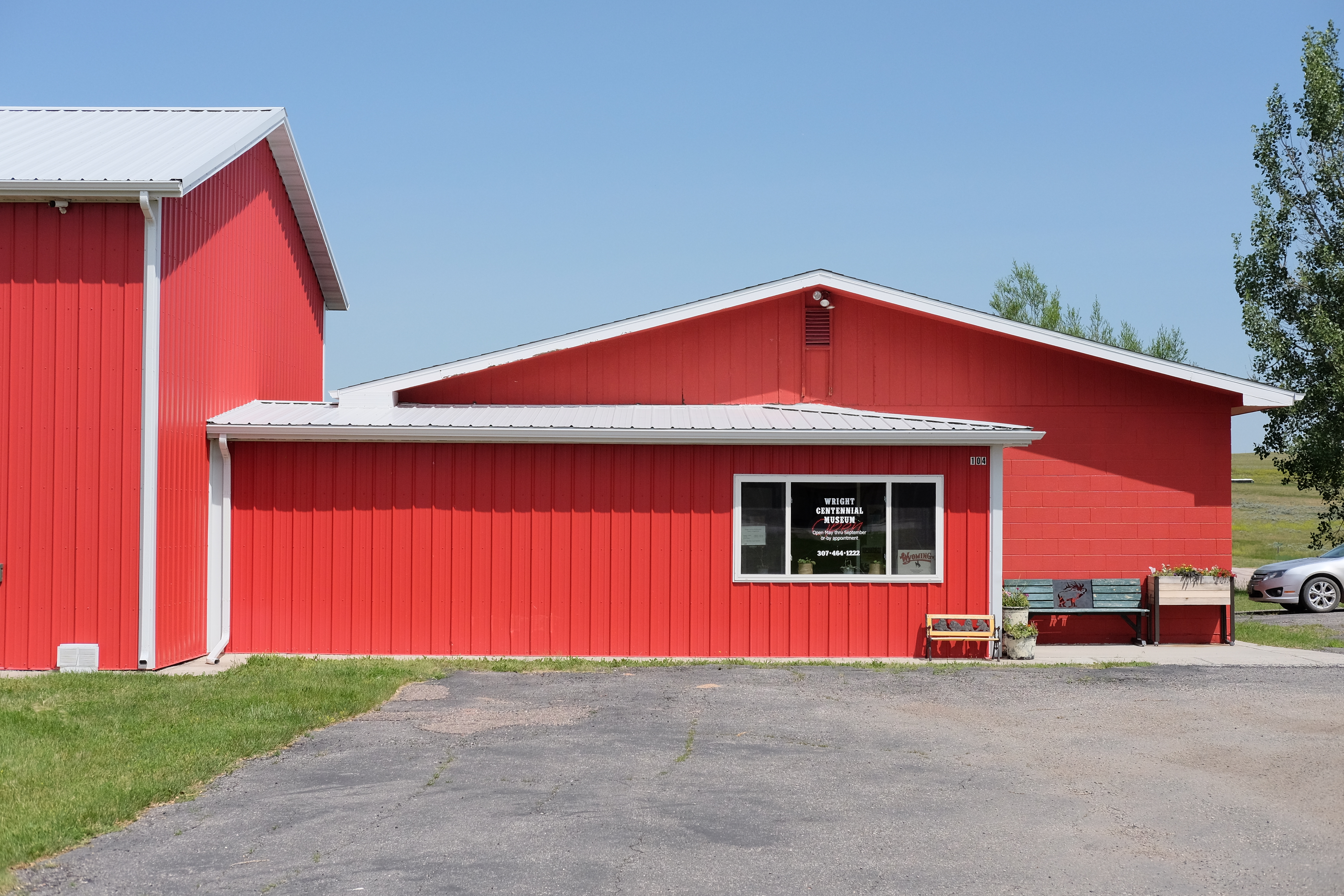
Wright Centennial Museum

Ten thousand years ago, the first people came to the high plains to hunt buffalo and antelope. In more recent times, the Sioux and Crow claimed this area as their hunting grounds. In the 1880s, ranchers came to graze longhorn cattle and sheep on the open range. They were followed by homesteaders lured by the promise of free land.

Official settlement began in the area in the early 1900s but boomed in the 1970s, with the creation of the Black Thunder Coal Mine, the largest mine in the Powder River Basin and most productive mine in the United States.

The Wright family homesteaded the area in 1911 creating the Wright Community. Shortly after moving to the area, R. A. Wright opened Wright's first Post Office providing mail service to area ranchers. The community became known as Wright, Wyoming.

In 1976, during the economic boom led by Amax Coal, Black Thunder coal mine was developed near town. As with all energy towns, housing, schools, and essential services were needed. And like other coal mining regions, the Atlantic Richfield coal company stepped up and built the newly organized community, developing housing and a company store.

The Town of Wright was incorporated in 1985, making it one of Wyoming's newest municipalities with a rich history. By 1990, Wright was a well-established community with a population of 1,236 people.

On August 12, 2005, an F2 rated tornado struck a mobile home park at Wright, destroying 91 homes, damaging others, and killing two people. Around that time, the residents there proposed a split from Campbell County.

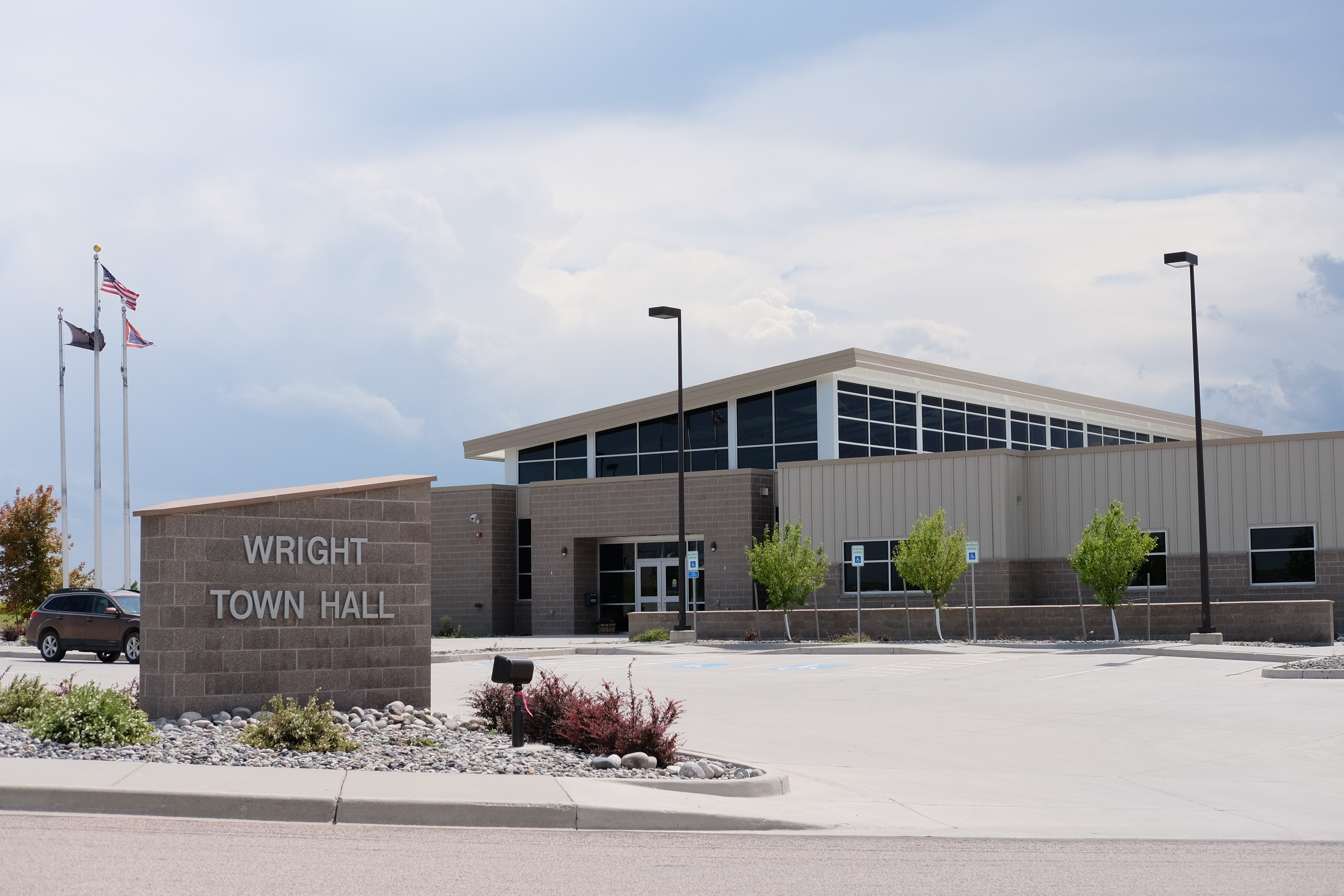
Wright Town Hall

== Geography ==
According to the United States Census Bureau, the town has a total area of 2.85 square miles (7.38 km^{2}), all land.

== Demographics ==
Historical population
Census	Pop.	Note	%±
1990	1,236		—
2000	1,347		9.0%
2010	1,807		34.1%
2020	1,644		−9.0%
2023 (est.)	1,653	▲	0.5%
U.S. Decennial Census

=== 2010 census ===
As of the census of 2010, there were 1,807 people, 685 households, and 476 families residing in the town. The population density was 634.0 inhabitants per square mile (244.8/km^{2}). There were 813 housing units at an average density of 285.3 per square mile (110.2/km^{2}). The racial makeup of the town was 94.5% White, 0.1% African American, 1.4% Native American, 0.2% Asian, 1.8% from other races, and 2.0% from two or more races. Hispanic or Latino of any race were 6.2% of the population.

There were 685 households, of which 40.0% had children under the age of 18 living with them, 55.9% were married couples living together, 6.1% had a female householder with no husband present, 7.4% had a male householder with no wife present, and 30.5% were non-families. 24.4% of all households were made up of individuals, and 1.2% had someone living alone who was 65 years of age or older. The average household size was 2.64 and the average family size was 3.16.

The median age in the town was 32.8 years. 30.5% of residents were under the age of 18; 7.8% were between the ages of 18 and 24; 28.7% were from 25 to 44; 30.8% were from 45 to 64; and 2.2% were 65 years of age or older. The gender makeup of the town was 55.0% male and 45.0% female.

=== 2000 census ===
As of the census of 2000, there were 1,347 people, 475 households, and 388 families residing in the town. The population density was 490.0 people per square mile (189.1/km^{2}). There were 544 housing units at an average density of 197.9 per square mile (76.4/km^{2}). The racial makeup of the town was 97.62% White, 0.45% Native American, 0.07% Asian, 0.82% from other races, and 1.04% from two or more races. Hispanic or Latino of any race were 2.30% of the population.

There were 475 households, out of which 48.4% had children under the age of 18 living with them, 68.6% were married couples living together, 7.2% had a female householder with no husband present, and 18.3% were non-families. 15.4% of all households were made up of individuals, and 1.9% had someone living alone who was 65 years of age or older. The average household size was 2.84 and the average family size was 3.15.

In the town, the population was spread out, with 33.9% under the age of 18, 6.6% from 18 to 24, 34.7% from 25 to 44, 23.3% from 45 to 64, and 1.6% who were 65 years of age or older. The median age was 34 years. For every 100 females, there were 112.1 males. For every 100 females age 18 and over, there were 107.2 males.

The median income for a household in the town was $53,125, and the median income for a family was $55,764. Males had a median income of $46,058 versus $22,955 for females. The per capita income for the town was $20,126. About 3.9% of families and 6.1% of the population were below the poverty line, including 6.8% of those under age 18 and 33.3% of those age 65 or over.

== Education ==
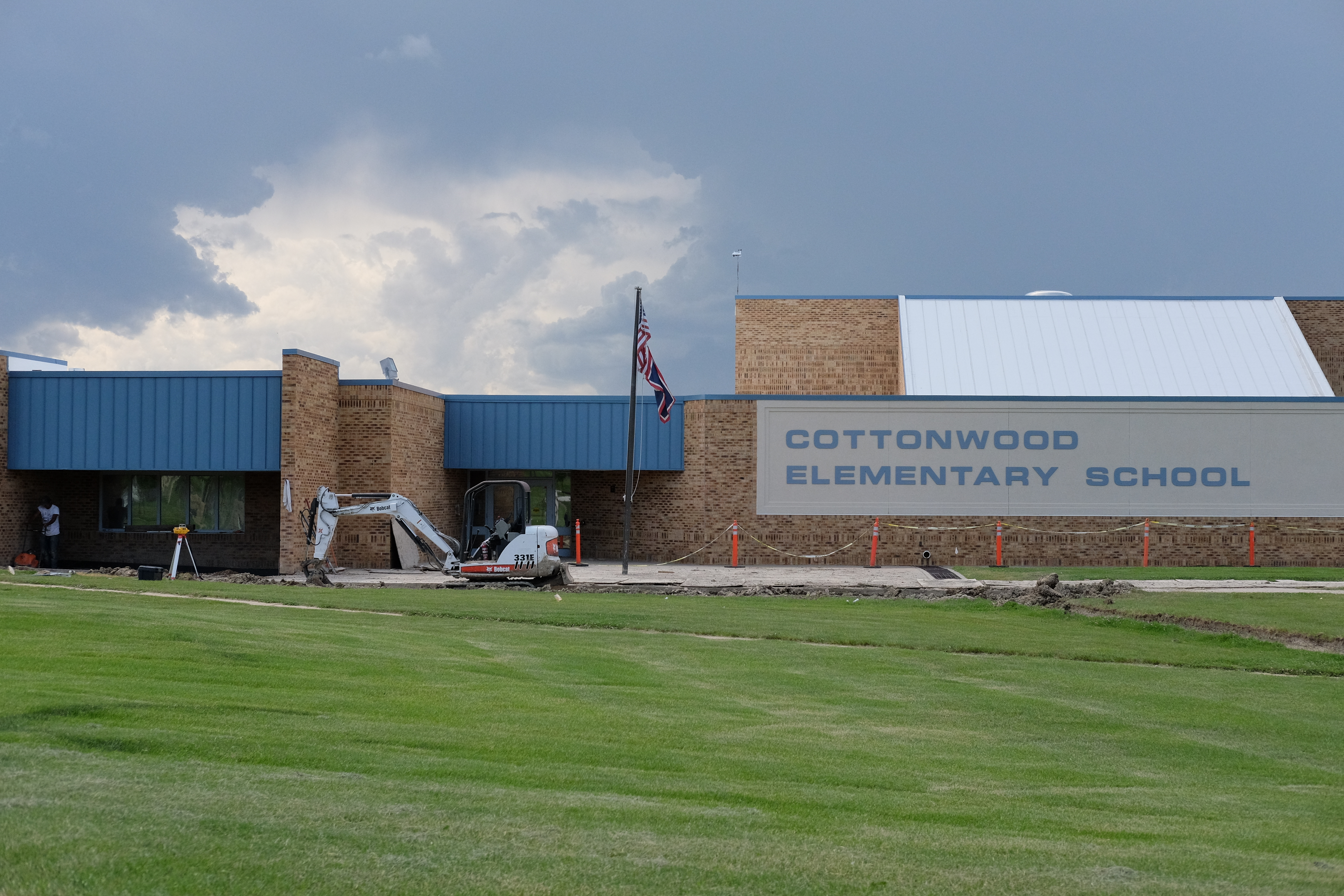
Cottonwood Elementary School

Public education in the town of Wright is provided by Campbell County School District #1. Zoned campuses include Cottonwood Elementary School (grades K–6), and Wright Junior/Senior High School (grades 7–12) which competes in 2A athletics in Wyoming.

Wright has a public library, a branch of the Campbell County Public Library System.

== Economy ==
Having been established as a mining town, the majority of people living in Wright are employed by the various mines surrounding it. The site for the proposed, but stalled, Two Elk Energy Park is several miles from town. The Two Elk power plant is a planned 300 megawatt power plant which would burn "waste coal" from mines in the area. Waste coal is low-grade coal unsuitable for shipping and sale which would otherwise be reburied. Recent iterations of the plan include using beetle-killed pine as fuel. Only a shed and a partial foundation are at the site. Over 16 years, a series of permit extensions have been issued by Wyoming. Nearly half a billion dollars are available from tax-exempt bonds, but additional investment is required in order to fund the plant.

== See also ==
- List of municipalities in Wyoming
