= Midwest, Wyoming =

Town in Natrona County, Wyoming, United States

- Town
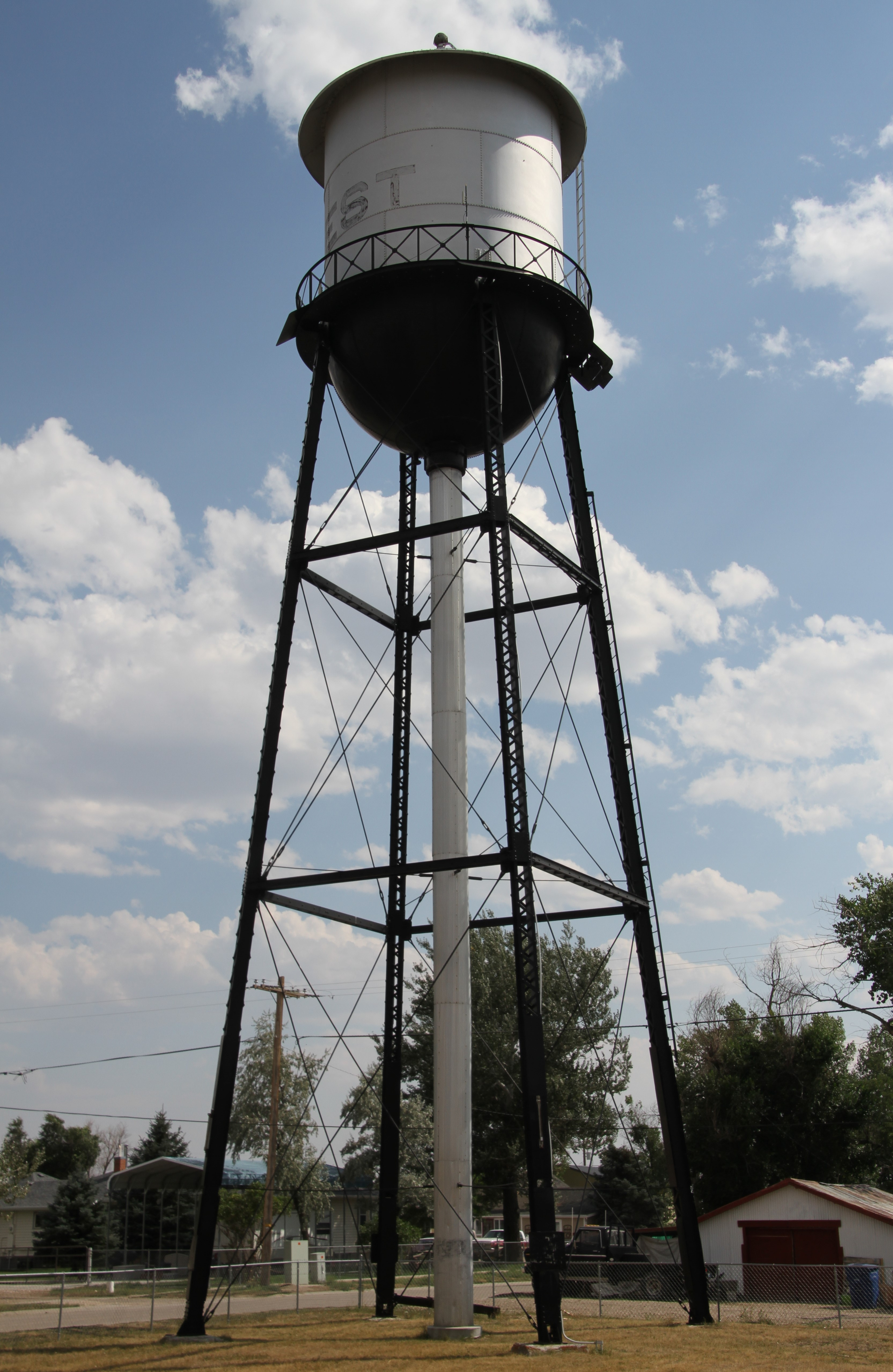
- Midwest, Wyoming water tower

- Location of Midwest in Natrona County, Wyoming.
- Coordinates: 43°24′39″N 106°16′38″W
- Country: United States
- State: Wyoming
- County: Natrona

Area
  - Total: 0.49 sq mi (1.27 km^{2})
  - Land: 0.49 sq mi (1.27 km^{2})
  - Water: 0 sq mi (0.00 km^{2})
- Elevation: 4,849 ft (1,478 m)

Population (2020)
  - Total: 285
  - Density: 802.9/sq mi (309.99/km^{2})
- Time zone: UTC-7 (Mountain (MST))
  - Summer (DST): UTC-6 (MDT)
- ZIP code: 82643
- Area code: 307
- FIPS code: 56-52445
- GNIS feature ID: 2412992

Midwest is a town in Natrona County, Wyoming, United States. It is part of the Casper, Wyoming Metropolitan Statistical Area. The population was 285 at the 2020 census.

== Demographics ==
Historical population
Census	Pop.	Note	%±
1980	638		—
1990	495		−22.4%
2000	408		−17.6%
2010	404		−1.0%
2020	285		−29.5%
2023 (est.)	286	▲	0.4%
U.S. Decennial Census

=== 2010 census ===
As of the census of 2010, there were 404 people, 148 households, and 104 families living in the town. The population density was 939.5 inhabitants per square mile (362.7/km^{2}). There were 200 housing units at an average density of 465.1 units per square mile (179.6 units/km^{2}). The racial makeup of the town was 95.5% White, 0.2% African American, 1.2% Native American, 0.2% Asian, 0.2% from other races, and 2.5% from two or more races. Hispanic or Latino of any race were 3.2% of the population.

There were 148 households, of which 39.9% had children under the age of 18 living with them, 44.6% were married couples living together, 16.2% had a female householder with no husband present, 9.5% had a male householder with no wife present, and 29.7% were non-families. 20.3% of all households were made up of individuals, and 4.7% had someone living alone who was 65 years of age or older. The average household size was 2.73 and the average family size was 3.09.

The median age in the town was 30.9 years. 29.7% of residents were under the age of 18; 8.4% were between the ages of 18 and 24; 26.8% were from 25 to 44; 29.2% were from 45 to 64; and 5.9% were 65 years of age or older. The gender makeup of the town was 50.0% male and 50.0% female.

=== 2000 census ===
As of the census of 2000, there were 408 people, 149 households, and 101 families living in the town. The population density was 922.0 people per square mile (356.0 people/km^{2}). There were 228 housing units at an average density of 515.2 units per square mile (198.9 units/km^{2}). The racial makeup of the town was 95.34% White, 0.25% African American, 1.23% Native American, 1.96% from other races, and 1.23% from two or more races. Hispanic or Latino of any race were 2.70% of the population.

There were 149 households, out of which 38.9% had children under the age of 18 living with them, 53.0% were married couples living together, 11.4% had a female householder with no husband present, and 32.2% were non-families. 26.2% of all households were made up of individuals, and 13.4% had someone living alone who was 65 years of age or older. The average household size was 2.74 and the average family size was 3.33.

In the town, the population was spread out, with 33.6% under the age of 18, 5.4% from 18 to 24, 29.9% from 25 to 44, 22.1% from 45 to 64, and 9.1% who were 65 years of age or older. The median age was 33 years. For every 100 females, there were 105.0 males. For every 100 females age 18 and over, there were 99.3 males.

The median income for a household in the town was $30,000, and the median income for a family was $33,125. Males had a median income of $28,000 versus $20,625 for females. The per capita income for the town was $12,891. About 25.0% of families and 29.1% of the population were below the poverty line, including 45.0% of those under age 18 and 23.7% of those age 65 or over.

== Geography ==
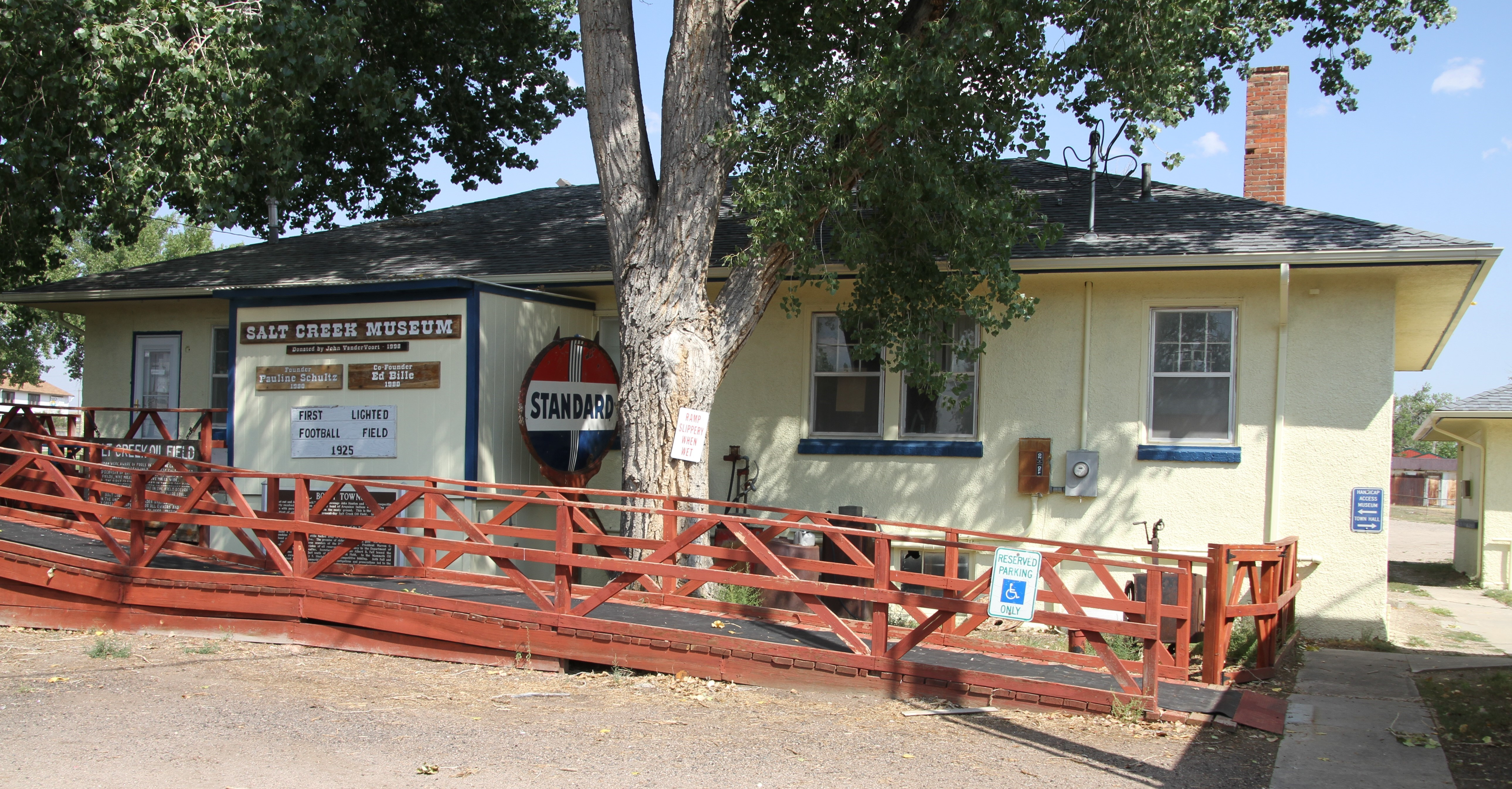
Salt Creek Museum in Midwest, Wyoming

According to the United States Census Bureau, the town has a total area of 0.43 square miles (1.11 km^{2}), all land.

=== Climate ===
According to the Köppen Climate Classification system, Midwest has a warm-summer humid continental climate, abbreviated "Dfb" on climate maps. The hottest temperature recorded in Midwest was 106 °F (41 °C) on July 12, 1973, and August 5, 1979, while the coldest temperature recorded was −42 °F (−41 °C) on December 22, 2022.

Climate data for Midwest, Wyoming, 1991–2020 normals, extremes 1939–present
Month	Jan	Feb	Mar	Apr	May	Jun	Jul	Aug	Sep	Oct	Nov	Dec	Year
Record high °F (°C)	64 (18)	70 (21)	78 (26)	89 (32)	94 (34)	104 (40)	106 (41)	106 (41)	100 (38)	89 (32)	76 (24)	66 (19)	106 (41)
Mean maximum °F (°C)	51.2 (10.7)	55.1 (12.8)	68.0 (20.0)	77.6 (25.3)	85.7 (29.8)	93.9 (34.4)	99.1 (37.3)	96.8 (36.0)	92.2 (33.4)	80.8 (27.1)	66.2 (19.0)	53.7 (12.1)	97.7 (36.5)
Mean daily maximum °F (°C)	35.6 (2.0)	37.5 (3.1)	48.9 (9.4)	56.4 (13.6)	66.2 (19.0)	78.6 (25.9)	88.1 (31.2)	86.4 (30.2)	76.0 (24.4)	60.8 (16.0)	46.1 (7.8)	35.4 (1.9)	59.7 (15.4)
Daily mean °F (°C)	23.6 (−4.7)	25.4 (−3.7)	35.2 (1.8)	42.1 (5.6)	51.9 (11.1)	62.2 (16.8)	70.3 (21.3)	68.3 (20.2)	58.6 (14.8)	45.5 (7.5)	33.3 (0.7)	23.7 (−4.6)	45.0 (7.2)
Mean daily minimum °F (°C)	11.6 (−11.3)	13.3 (−10.4)	21.4 (−5.9)	27.7 (−2.4)	37.6 (3.1)	45.8 (7.7)	52.6 (11.4)	50.2 (10.1)	41.2 (5.1)	30.3 (−0.9)	20.4 (−6.4)	12.0 (−11.1)	30.3 (−0.9)
Mean minimum °F (°C)	−11.1 (−23.9)	−9.2 (−22.9)	5.0 (−15.0)	15.8 (−9.0)	25.0 (−3.9)	36.2 (2.3)	44.6 (7.0)	41.6 (5.3)	30.6 (−0.8)	14.4 (−9.8)	−0.9 (−18.3)	−7.8 (−22.1)	−18.6 (−28.1)
Record low °F (°C)	−39 (−39)	−31 (−35)	−20 (−29)	−4 (−20)	15 (−9)	26 (−3)	33 (1)	30 (−1)	14 (−10)	−8 (−22)	−29 (−34)	−42 (−41)	−42 (−41)
Average precipitation inches (mm)	0.32 (8.1)	0.53 (13)	0.96 (24)	1.39 (35)	2.52 (64)	1.59 (40)	1.07 (27)	0.66 (17)	0.88 (22)	1.29 (33)	0.57 (14)	0.61 (15)	12.39 (312.1)
Average snowfall inches (cm)	5.0 (13)	8.3 (21)	7.7 (20)	5.7 (14)	0.7 (1.8)	0.0 (0.0)	0.0 (0.0)	0.0 (0.0)	0.3 (0.76)	4.1 (10)	6.6 (17)	7.5 (19)	45.9 (116.56)
Average extreme snow depth inches (cm)	4 (10)	4 (10)	5 (13)	4 (10)	1 (2.5)	0 (0)	0 (0)	0 (0)	0 (0)	3 (7.6)	4 (10)	5 (13)	5 (13)
Average precipitation days (≥ 0.01 in)	3.7	4.4	4.8	6.4	8.1	6.1	4.4	3.6	4.4	4.9	3.5	4.1	58.4
Average snowy days (≥ 0.1 in)	3.5	4.1	3.3	2.5	0.4	0.0	0.0	0.0	0.2	1.5	2.9	4.1	22.5
Source 1: NOAA
Source 2: National Weather Service

== Education ==
Public education in the town of Midwest is provided by Natrona County School District #1.

== Notable people ==
- Loren Driscoll (1928–2008), opera singer

== See also category ==
- List of municipalities in Wyoming
