= Salt Creek Oil Field =

Oil field in Wyoming

Coordinates: 43°23′14″N 106°22′49″W

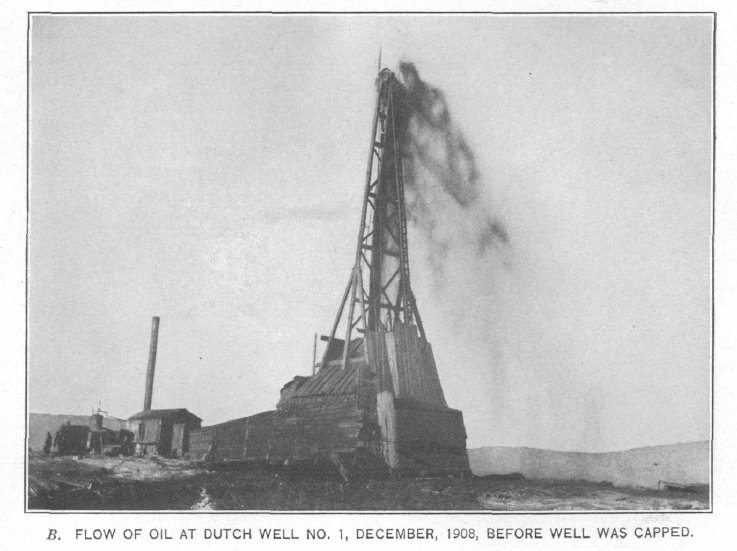
Dutch Well No. 1, 1908, in Salt Creek Oil Field

The Salt Creek Oil Field is an oil field located in Natrona County, Wyoming. By 1970, more oil had been produced by this field than any other in the Rocky Mountains region, and accounted for 20 percent of the total production in Wyoming.

Petroleum seeps in the area were known before 1880, but oil strikes near Lander led to claims by Schoonmaker and Cy Iba. In 1889 the first well to strike oil was drilled in the Shannon pool by Philip M. Shannon, president of the Pennsylvania Oil & Gas Company, who in 1895 built an oil refinery in Casper to process the oil. Dr. Porro, an Italian geologist working for the Dutch company Petroleum Maatschappij Salt Creek in 1906, located the Dutch No. 1 near a large oil seep south of the Shannon wells, which was drilled in 1908. The "gusher" well reached an oil sand after drilling through 1,000 feet (300 m) of shale.

In 1915, a portion of the Teapot Dome was made Naval Petroleum Reserve Number Three.

== Geology ==
The field is on an anticline with 1,500 feet (460 m) of closure, which formed in the Late Cretaceous or Early Tertiary. The anticline has two distinct domes, the "Salt Creek Dome" to the north and the "Teapot Dome" to the south. Production is from stratigraphic traps in the Lakota, Sundance and Tensleep formations plus two Frontier Formations, which is an offshore bar sandstone, all of which are interbedded with marine shales. This second Frontier formation extends into the Teapot Dome to the south. The Frontier lies between the Mowry Shale and Niobrara Formation.

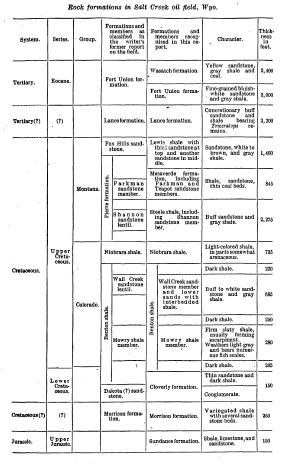
Salt Creek Oil Field Stratigraphy

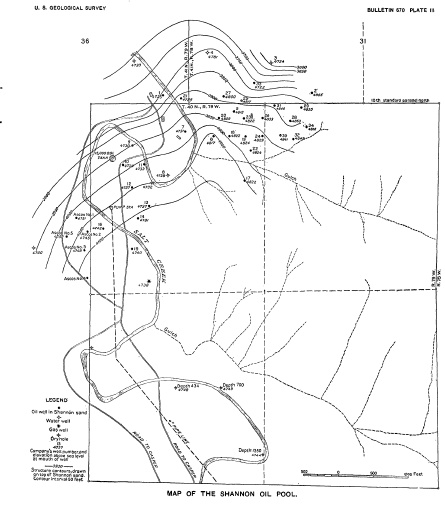
Shannon Oil Pool in Salt Creek Oil Field

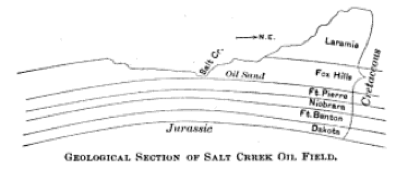
Geological section of Salt Creek Oil Field

== Enhanced Oil Recovery ==
In the Salt Creek field, Enhanced oil recovery with CO_{2} is used to increase oil production. The CO_{2} is captured in a natural gas facility in the nearby LaBarge field.

In 2016, CO_{2} was leaking from an abandoned well in the field and led to the temporary closure of a school.

== Bibliography ==
- Barlow, J.A. Jr., and Haun, J.D., 1970, Regional Stratigraphy of Frontier Formation and Relation to Salt Creek Field, Wyoming, in Geology of Giant Petroleum Fields, Halbouty, M.T., editor, AAPG Memoir 14, Tulsa: American Association of Petroleum Geologists.
- Wegemann, C.H., 1911, The Lander and Salt Creek Oil Fields, Wyoming, US Dept. of the Interior USGS Bulletin 452, Washington: Government Printing Office. (Public domain ed.)
- Wegemann, C.H., 1918, The Salt Creek Oil Field, Wyoming, US Dept. of the Interior USGS Bulletin 670, Washington: Government Printing Office. (Public domain ed.)
