= Casper, Wyoming =

- City
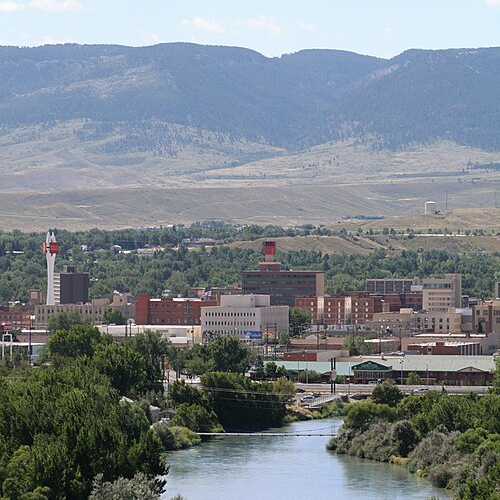
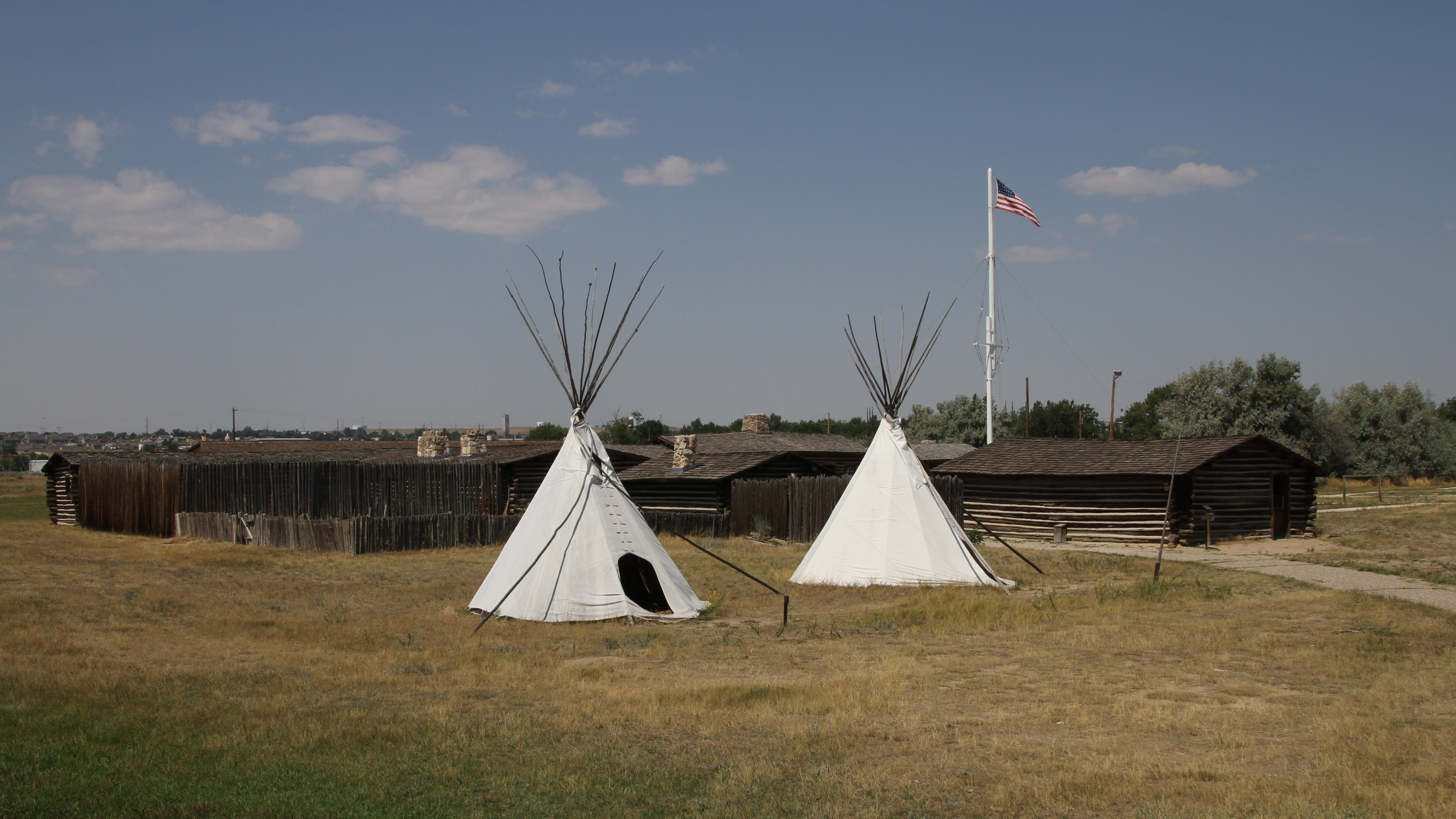
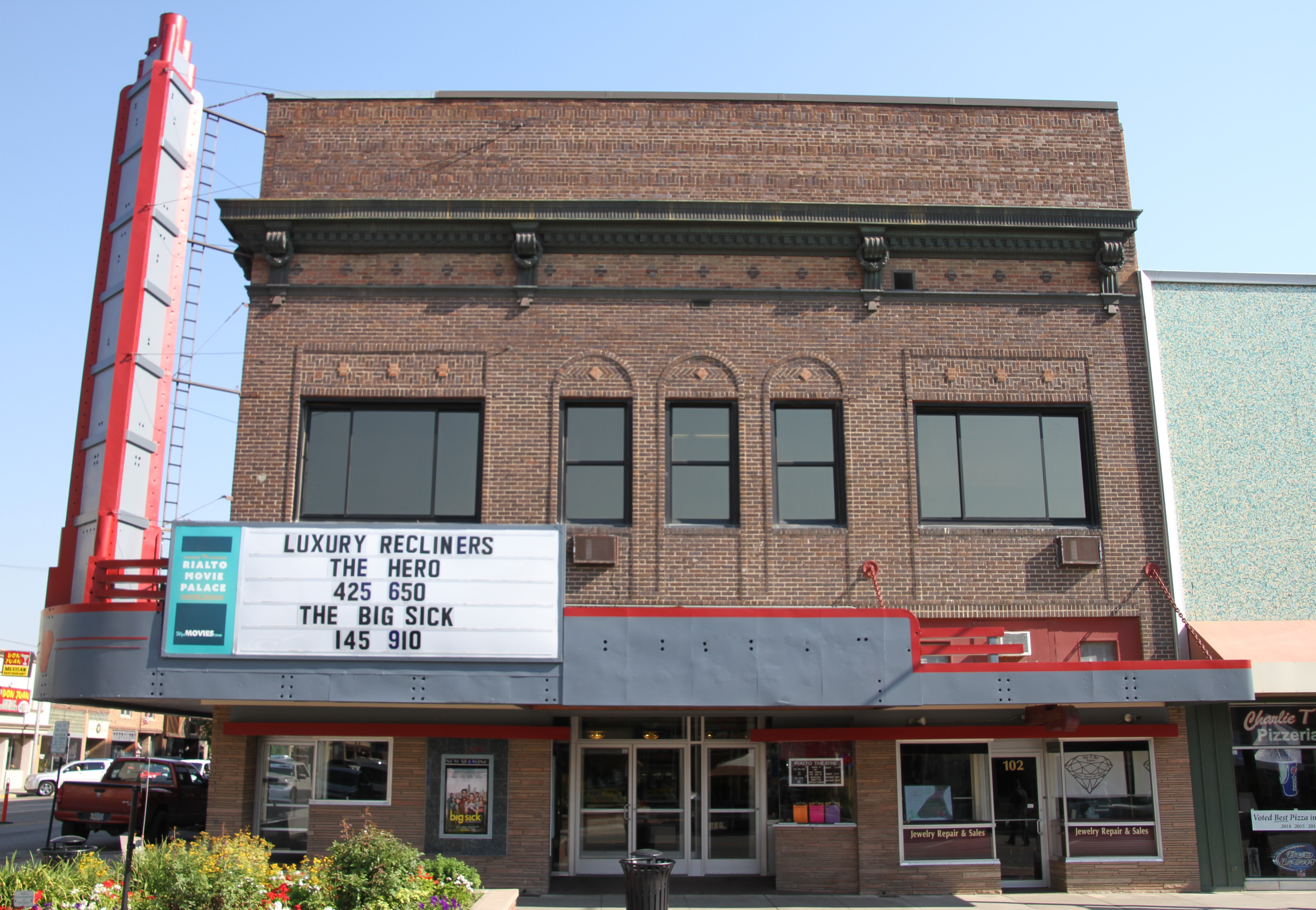
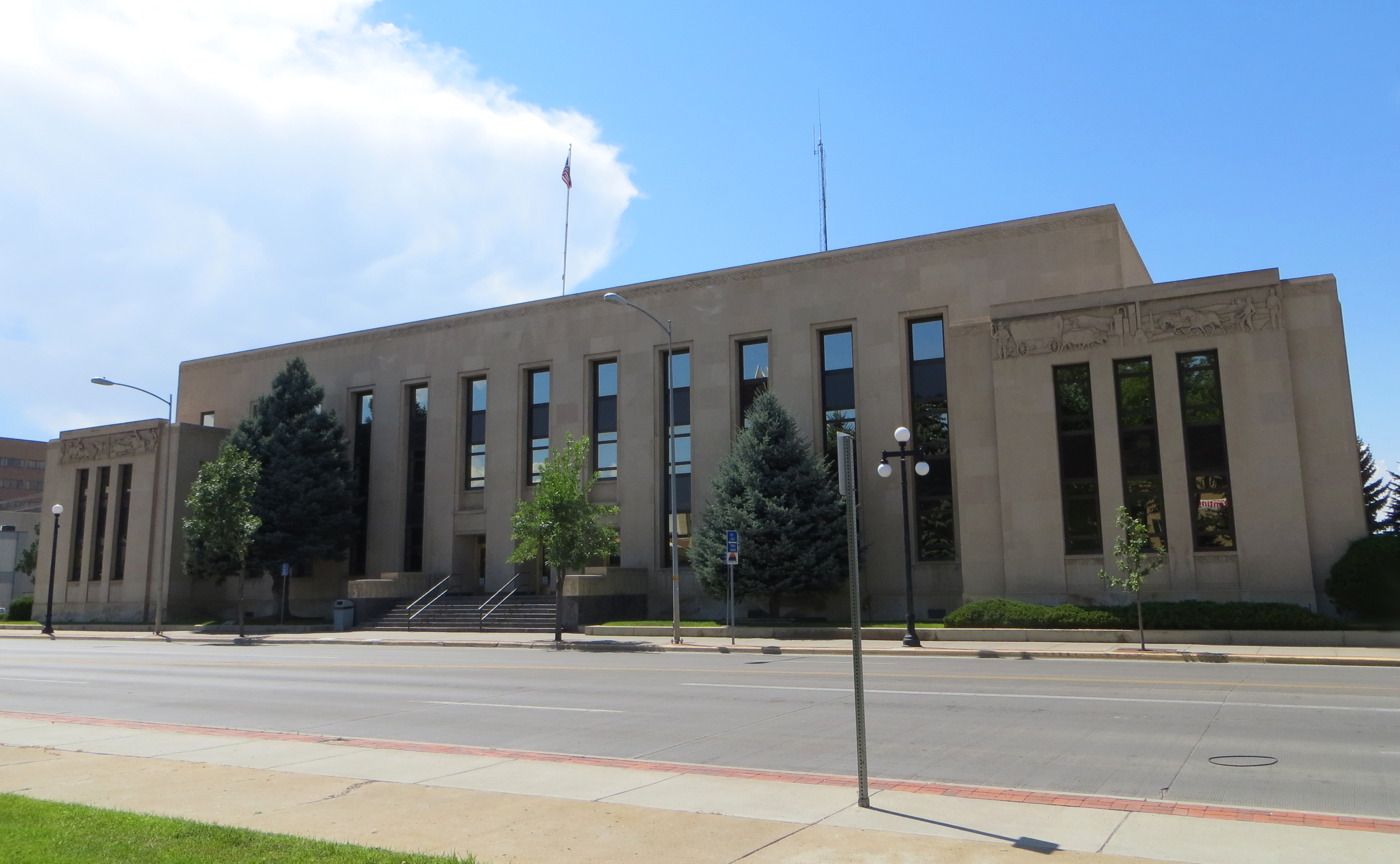
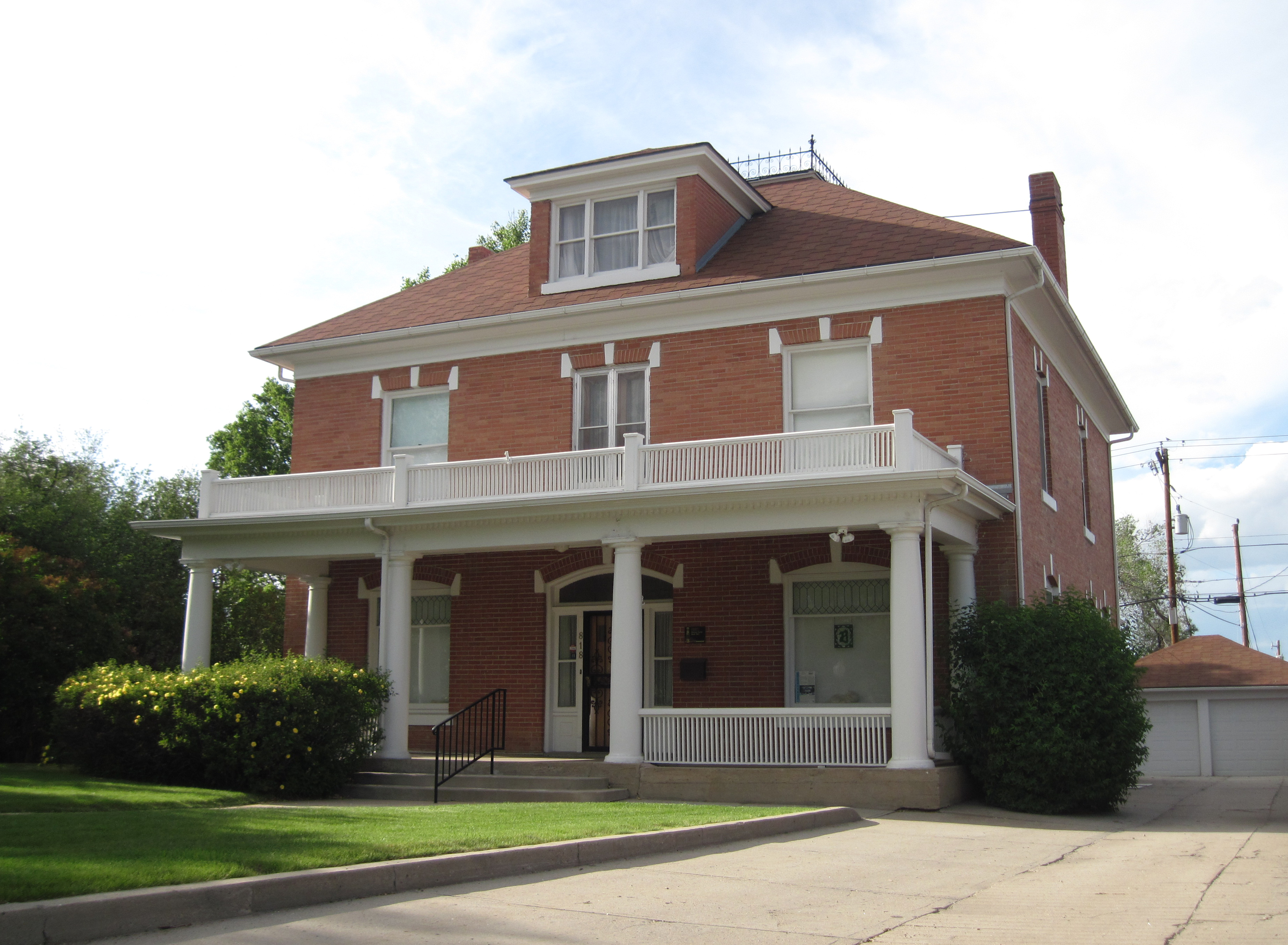
- Downtown Casper with Casper Mountain and the North Platte River Fort Caspar Rialto Theater Natrona County Courthouse Bishop House Casper College

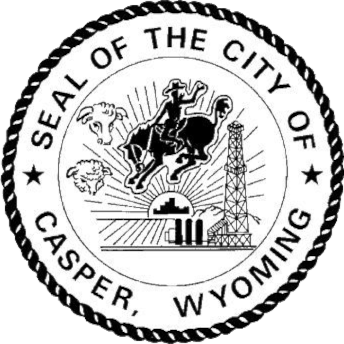
- Flag Seal Logo
- Nickname: "The Oil City"
- Location within Wyoming Location within the United States
- Coordinates: 42°50′25″N 106°19′05″W
- Country: United States
- State: Wyoming

Government
  - Type: Council–manager
  - City Manager: Janine Jordan

Area
  - Total: 26.88 sq mi (69.62 km^{2})
  - Land: 26.55 sq mi (68.76 km^{2})
  - Water: 0.33 sq mi (0.86 km^{2})
- Elevation: 5,150 ft (1,570 m)

Population (2020)
  - Total: 59,038
  - Density: 2,182.2/sq mi (842.55/km^{2})
- Time zone: UTC−7 (MST)
  - Summer (DST): UTC−6 (MDT)
- ZIP Codes: 82601–82602, 82604–82605, 82609, 82615, 82630, 82638, 82646
- Area code: 307
- FIPS code: 56-13150
- GNIS feature ID: 2409406
- Website: casperwy.gov

Casper is a city in and the county seat of Natrona County, Wyoming, United States. It is the second-most populous city in the state after Cheyenne, with its population at 59,038 as of the 2020 census. Casper is nicknamed "The Oil City" and has a long history of oil boomtown and cowboy culture, dating back to the development of the nearby Salt Creek Oil Field.

Casper is located in east central Wyoming on the North Platte River.

== History ==
The city was established east of the former site of Fort Caspar, in an area that grew for European settlers during the mid-19th century mass migration of land seekers along the Oregon, California, and Mormon trails, where several nearby ferries offered passage across the North Platte River in the early 1840s. In 1859, Louis Guinard built a bridge and trading post near the original ferry locations, allowing overland travel to continue through the area.

The government also posted the military garrison to protect telegraph and mail service. It was under the command of Lieutenant Colonel William O. Collins. Native American attacks increased after the Sand Creek Massacre in Colorado in 1864, bringing more troops to the post, which was by now called Platte Bridge Station. In July 1865, Lt. Colonel William Collins' beloved son Lieutenant Caspar W. Collins was killed near the post by a group of Indian warriors, and three months later the garrison was renamed Fort Caspar in his son's honor.

In 1867, the troops were ordered to abandon Fort Caspar in favor of Fort Fetterman, downstream on the North Platte along the Bozeman Trail. However, the town itself was settled twenty years later in 1887, and incorporated a year later by developers as an anticipated stopping point during the expansion of the Wyoming Central Railway.

A site a few miles east was planned as the original site, where homesteader Joshua Stroud lived prior to the actual construction of the train station for the Chicago and North Western Railway. The site was laid out by the Pioneer Town Site Company in 1888 and was known as Strouds, but the name Casper soon prevailed. While the name is derived from Fort Caspar and Lt. Caspar Collins, it is officially named "Casper" due to a typo occurring during the official registration.

Casper was an early commercial rival to both Bessemer and Douglas, Wyoming. The absence of a railhead doomed Bessemer in favor of Casper, while Douglas, also a railhead, survives to the present day. This rail presence also made Casper the starting off point for the "invaders" in the Johnson County War, since the chartered train carrying the men from Texas stopped at Casper.

Casper has a place within history of film, near the town being the location of a movie from the 1960s, starring the actor, John Wayne. Parts of the film Hellfighters were shot west of the city, and another film (Starship Troopers) in the 1990s was used for shooting scenes and film production. Hell's Half Acre's natural geology being close to Casper and inside Natrona County, was used for replicating planets in the motion picture. One of these fictional planets is named "Klendathu", a rocky sci-fi world. This location is 40 miles northwest of Casper, and gives locals an educational geology experience, observing rock formations formed over millions of years. These films have brought tourists to see the park and Snodgrass Ranch where John Wayne acted.

In more recent history, the city received a significant influx of visitors during the solar eclipse of August 21, 2017, due to its position along the path of totality.

== Geography ==
Waterfall at Casper's Rotary Park, at the base of Casper Mountain

Interstate 25, which approaches Casper from the north and east, is the main avenue of transportation to and from the city. The towns immediately adjacent to Casper are Mills, Evansville, and Bar Nunn. Unincorporated areas include Allendale, Dempsey Acres, Red Buttes, Indian Springs, and several others.

According to the United States Census Bureau, the city has a total area of 27.24 square miles (70.55 km^{2}), of which 26.90 square miles (69.67 km^{2}) is land and 0.34 square miles (0.88 km^{2}) is water.

=== Climate ===
Casper, as with most of the rest of Wyoming, has a continental semi-arid climate (Köppen climate classification: BSk), with long, cold, but dry winters, hot but generally dry summers, mild springs, and short and crisp autumns. Normal daily maxima range from 35.2 °F (1.8 °C) in January to 89.0 °F (31.7 °C) in July. Snow can fall heavily during the winter and early to mid-spring months, and usually falls in May and October. Precipitation is greatest in spring and early summer, but even then it is not high. Highs reach 90 °F (32.2 °C) on 37.8 days per year and fail to surpass freezing on 41.3. Lows drop to 0 °F (−17.8 °C) on an average of 14.6 nights annually. The highest temperature recorded in Casper was 104 °F (40.0 °C) on July 12, 1954, July 16, 2005, and July 29, 2006, while the lowest temperature recorded was −42 °F (−41.1 °C) on December 22, 2022.

Climate data for Casper, Wyoming (CPR), 1991–2020 normals, extremes 1939–present
Month	Jan	Feb	Mar	Apr	May	Jun	Jul	Aug	Sep	Oct	Nov	Dec	Year
Record high °F (°C)	60 (16)	68 (20)	83 (28)	84 (29)	95 (35)	102 (39)	104 (40)	103 (39)	100 (38)	87 (31)	73 (23)	66 (19)	104 (40)
Mean maximum °F (°C)	50.8 (10.4)	55.1 (12.8)	68.1 (20.1)	76.9 (24.9)	85.4 (29.7)	94.3 (34.6)	99.1 (37.3)	96.9 (36.1)	91.9 (33.3)	80.1 (26.7)	65.7 (18.7)	52.8 (11.6)	99.5 (37.5)
Mean daily maximum °F (°C)	35.2 (1.8)	37.8 (3.2)	48.8 (9.3)	56.3 (13.5)	66.8 (19.3)	79.6 (26.4)	89.0 (31.7)	86.7 (30.4)	75.6 (24.2)	59.7 (15.4)	45.9 (7.7)	34.7 (1.5)	59.7 (15.4)
Daily mean °F (°C)	25.1 (−3.8)	26.6 (−3.0)	35.8 (2.1)	42.3 (5.7)	52.0 (11.1)	62.5 (16.9)	71.0 (21.7)	69.0 (20.6)	58.9 (14.9)	45.3 (7.4)	34.0 (1.1)	24.8 (−4.0)	45.6 (7.6)
Mean daily minimum °F (°C)	15.0 (−9.4)	15.4 (−9.2)	22.7 (−5.2)	28.2 (−2.1)	37.1 (2.8)	45.4 (7.4)	53.0 (11.7)	51.4 (10.8)	42.2 (5.7)	30.9 (−0.6)	22.0 (−5.6)	14.8 (−9.6)	31.5 (−0.3)
Mean minimum °F (°C)	−12.2 (−24.6)	−10.0 (−23.3)	3.3 (−15.9)	13.8 (−10.1)	24.5 (−4.2)	37.4 (3.0)	42.9 (6.1)	40.0 (4.4)	29.1 (−1.6)	13.9 (−10.1)	−2.6 (−19.2)	−11.5 (−24.2)	−20.8 (−29.3)
Record low °F (°C)	−40 (−40)	−32 (−36)	−25 (−32)	−6 (−21)	16 (−9)	25 (−4)	30 (−1)	29 (−2)	15 (−9)	−9 (−23)	−27 (−33)	−42 (−41)	−42 (−41)
Average precipitation inches (mm)	0.49 (12)	0.56 (14)	0.84 (21)	1.41 (36)	2.21 (56)	1.34 (34)	1.19 (30)	0.79 (20)	0.95 (24)	1.19 (30)	0.64 (16)	0.61 (15)	12.22 (308)
Average snowfall inches (cm)	9.0 (23)	10.9 (28)	10.3 (26)	10.5 (27)	2.6 (6.6)	0.1 (0.25)	0.0 (0.0)	0.0 (0.0)	1.5 (3.8)	7.0 (18)	8.9 (23)	11.0 (28)	71.8 (183.65)
Average extreme snow depth inches (cm)	5.0 (13)	5.2 (13)	3.8 (9.7)	2.6 (6.6)	0.7 (1.8)	0.1 (0.25)	0.0 (0.0)	0.0 (0.0)	0.3 (0.76)	2.2 (5.6)	3.4 (8.6)	4.7 (12)	9.1 (23)
Average precipitation days (≥ 0.01 in)	6.0	6.9	8.0	10.3	11.0	8.5	6.8	5.8	6.8	7.6	6.2	7.0	90.9
Average snowy days (≥ 0.1 in)	6.1	7.5	6.8	6.0	1.6	0.0	0.0	0.0	0.5	3.8	5.6	7.6	45.5
Mean monthly sunshine hours	204.6	172.3	269.7	300.0	334.8	354.0	368.9	368.9	333.0	217.0	204.0	198.4	3,325.6
Mean daily sunshine hours	6.6	6.1	8.7	10	10.8	11.8	11.9	11.9	11.1	7	6.8	6.4	9.1
Mean daily daylight hours	9.5	10.6	12.0	13.4	14.7	15.3	15.0	13.9	12.5	11.0	9.7	9.1	12.2
Percentage possible sunshine	69	58	73	75	73	77	79	86	89	64	70	70	74
Average ultraviolet index	2	2	2	2	5	6	6	6	4	2	2	2	3
Source 1: NOAA, Weather Atlas (sun data)
Source 2: National Weather Service

== Demographics ==
Historical population
Census	Pop.	Note	%±
1880	40		—
1890	544		1,260.0%
1900	883		62.3%
1910	2,639		198.9%
1920	11,447		333.8%
1930	16,619		45.2%
1940	17,964		8.1%
1950	23,673		31.8%
1960	38,930		64.4%
1970	39,361		1.1%
1980	51,016		29.6%
1990	46,742		−8.4%
2000	49,644		6.2%
2010	55,316		11.4%
2020	59,038		6.7%

=== 2020 census ===
As of the 2020 census, Casper had a population of 59,038. The median age was 36.8 years. 24.5% of residents were under the age of 18 and 15.9% of residents were 65 years of age or older. For every 100 females there were 98.3 males, and for every 100 females age 18 and over there were 95.8 males age 18 and over.

99.4% of residents lived in urban areas, while 0.6% lived in rural areas.

There were 24,550 households in Casper, of which 29.9% had children under the age of 18 living in them. Of all households, 43.6% were married-couple households, 21.5% were households with a male householder and no spouse or partner present, and 26.6% were households with a female householder and no spouse or partner present. About 32.5% of all households were made up of individuals and 12.2% had someone living alone who was 65 years of age or older.

There were 27,166 housing units, of which 9.6% were vacant. The homeowner vacancy rate was 1.7% and the rental vacancy rate was 13.3%.

Racial composition as of the 2020 census
Race	Number	Percent
White	50,857	86.1%
Black or African American	672	1.1%
American Indian and Alaska Native	804	1.4%
Asian	531	0.9%
Native Hawaiian and Other Pacific Islander	59	0.1%
Some other race	1,653	2.8%
Two or more races	4,462	7.6%
Hispanic or Latino (of any race)	5,582	9.5%

=== 2010 census ===
As of the census of 2010, there were 55,316 people, 22,794 households, and 14,237 families residing in the city. The population density was 2,056.4 inhabitants per square mile (794.0/km^{2}). There were 24,536 housing units at an average density of 912.1 per square mile (352.2/km^{2}). The racial makeup of the city was 92.3% White, 1.0% African American, 0.9% Native American, 0.8% Asian, 2.3% from other races, and 2.6% from two or more races. Hispanic or Latino people of any race were 7.4% of the population.

There were 22,794 households, of which 31.5% had children under the age of 18 living with them, 46.1% were married couples living together, 11.2% had a female householder with no husband present, 5.2% had a male householder with no wife present, and 37.5% were non-families. Of all households 30.3% were made up of individuals, and 10.1% had someone living alone who was 65 years of age or older. The average household size was 2.38 and the average family size was 2.95.

The median age in the city was 36 years. 23.9% of residents were under the age of 18; 10.2% were between the ages of 18 and 24; 26.7% were from 25 to 44; 26.4% were from 45 to 64; and 12.9% were 65 years of age or older. The gender makeup of the city was 49.7% male and 50.3% female.

=== 2000 census ===
As of the census of 2000, there were 49,644 people, 20,343 households, and 13,141 families residing in the city. The population density was 2,073.2 people per square mile (800.5 people/km^{2}). There were 21,872 housing units at an average density of 913.4 per square mile (352.7/km^{2}). The racial makeup of the city was 94.03% White, 0.86% Black, 1.00% Native American, 0.49% Asian, 0.02% Pacific Islander, 2.04% from other races, and 1.56% from two or more races. 5.35% of the population were Hispanic or Latino of any race.

There were 20,343 households, out of which 31.8% had children under the age of 18 living with them, 49.6% were married couples living together, 11.1% had a female householder with no husband present, and 35.4% were non-families. Of all households 29.1% were made up of individuals, and 10.2% had someone living alone who was 65 years of age or older. The average household size was 2.38 and the average family size was 2.94.

In the city, the population was spread out, with 25.9% under the age of 18, 10.5% from 18 to 24, 27.7% from 25 to 44, 22.3% from 45 to 64, and 13.6% who were 65 years of age or older. The median age was 36 years. For every 100 females, there were 95.0 males. For every 100 females age 18 and over, there were 91.6 males.

The median income for a household in the city was $36,567, and the median income for a family was $46,267. Males had a median income of $34,905 versus $21,810 for females. The per capita income for the city was $19,409. About 8.5% of families and 11.4% of the population were below the poverty line, including 15.4% of those under age 18 and 7.3% of those age 65 or over.

== Economy ==
Casper is a regional center of banking and commerce.

After the discovery of crude oil in the region during the 1890s, Casper became the regional petroleum industry center. Oil has figured prominently in its history from nearly the outset. Oil was first discovered in the famous Salt Creek Oil Field in 1889, approximately 40 miles (64 km) north of Casper; the first refinery in Casper was built in 1895. The city has featured a refinery ever since, although various refineries have been built and closed over the years. As recently as the early 1980s, the city was near or home to three refineries. The surviving one, operated by Sinclair Oil Corporation, is located nearby in Evansville. Development of Wyoming coal and uranium fields in recent decades has helped Casper continue its role as a center in the energy industry.

Casper Wind Farm began operations near Casper in Natrona County and has 11 turbines with a generating capacity of 16.5 MW. Energy Transportation Inc. is headquartered in Casper. This logistics firm transports overweight and outsized components used in the wind power industry. The Casper landfill is also a disposal site for windmill blades.

== Arts and culture ==
=== Museums and historical sites ===
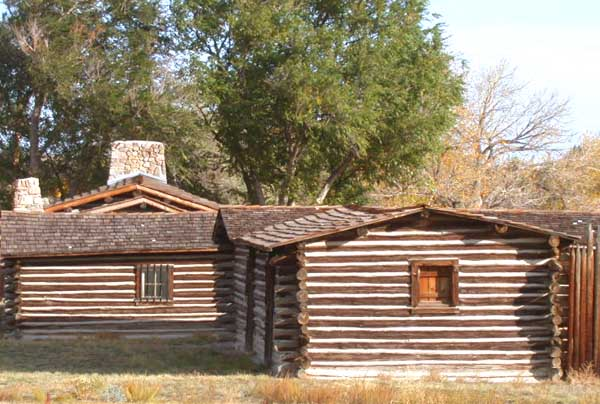
Buildings at Fort Caspar

Casper is home to a number of museums and historical sites:

- Fort Caspar Museum and Historic Site
- National Historic Trails Interpretive Center, a federally funded and operated museum
- Nicolaysen Art Museum
- Tate Geological Museum at Casper College
- Werner Wildlife Museum
- Wyoming Veterans Memorial Museum
- The Science Zone
- Historic Bishop Home

=== Performing arts and music ===
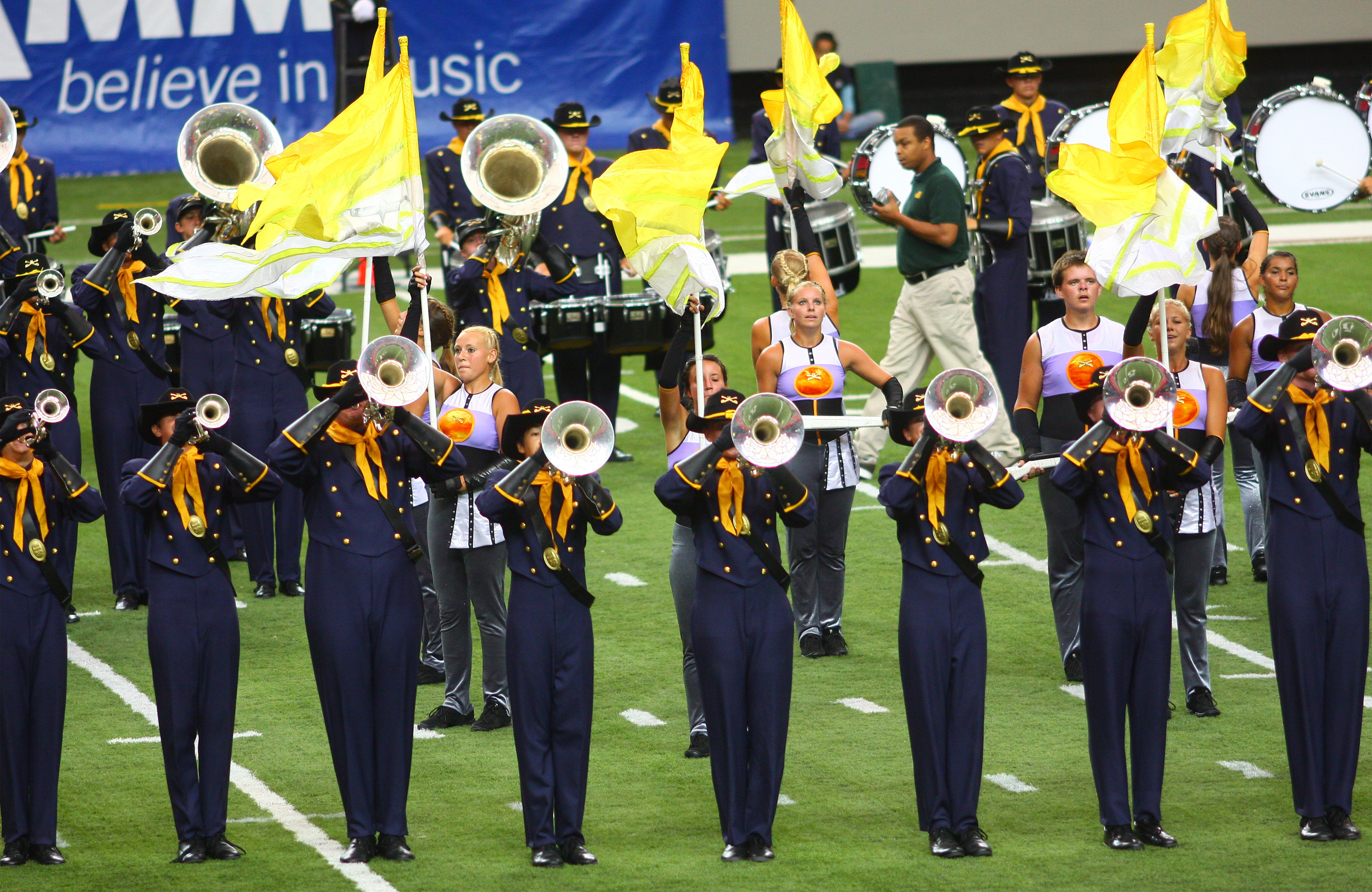
The Casper Troopers, part of Drum Corps International

Casper has three locations offering theater: the Gertrude Krampert Theatre at Casper College, Stage III Community Theatre, and the Casper Events Center where an annual series of touring Broadway shows, Broadway in Casper, can be seen.

Casper is home to the Troopers, a drum and bugle corps in Drum Corps International, and the Wyoming Symphony Orchestra. During the summer months, Casper's City Band performs free concerts Thursday evenings at Washington Park, weather permitting.

=== Architecture ===
Wyoming National Bank, constructed in 1964, a mid-century modern tower, was designed by Charles Deaton and is featured in Casper's logo.

=== Library ===
Casper has a public library, a branch of the Natrona County Public Library System.

== Sports ==
- UFC 6 took place at the Casper Events Center in 1995.
- Casper hosted the AIFA Championship Bowl III at the Casper Events Center on July 26, 2009.
- The Events Center has hosted the College National Finals Rodeo since 2001.
- The Casper Recreation Center offers basketball, fitness, racquetball, volleyball and is adjacent to the Casper Family Aquatics Center and Casper Ice Arena.
- Soccer matches are held at the Casper Soccer Complex.
- The Casper Municipal Golf Course is a public 27-hole golf course in Casper.

Sports teams based in Casper include:

- Casper Cannibal RFC, an amateur rugby football team in the Eastern Rockies Rugby Football Union
- Casper Coyotes were a Junior A hockey team in the Western States Hockey League (WSHL) that played out of the Casper Ice Arena. They renamed to Casper Bobcats for the 2018–2019 season and folded before the 2019–2020 season.
- Casper Ghosts (formerly). From 2001 to 2011, Mike Lansing Field hosted the Ghosts of the Pioneer League, Rookie-level affiliate of the Colorado Rockies. In 2011, the team relocated to Grand Junction, Colorado to become the Rockies.
- Casper Horseheads (formerly). From 2018 to 2022 the Horseheads, a collegiate summer baseball team of Independence League Baseball, played their home games at Mike Lansing Field before closing operations.
- Casper Spuds, a collegiate summer baseball team of Independence League Baseball that started play in the summer of 2023, after relocating from Caldwell, Idaho, playing their home games at Mike Lansing Field.

== Education ==
Casper is home to Casper College, a community college that offers bachelor's degrees in sixteen areas of study from the University of Wyoming through their UW/CC Center.

Public education in the city of Casper is provided by Natrona County School District #1. The district operates sixteen elementary schools, five middle schools, and three high schools in Casper. The high schools are Kelly Walsh, Natrona County, and Roosevelt High Schools. A program called CAPS is being added to Natrona County School District, which will provide more space and classrooms for juniors and seniors at the three high schools.

== Media ==
Casper is served by one print newspaper, the Casper Star-Tribune, a daily, and until recently the Casper Journal, published weekly. Casper is also home to WyoFile, an online publication focusing on state issues and Oil City News, an online news and weekly newspaper.

== Infrastructure ==
=== Transportation ===
==== Highways ====
- I-25
- US 20
- US 26
- US 87
- WYO 220
- WYO 251
- WYO 252
- WYO 254
- WYO 255
- WYO 258

==== Airports ====
The city has scheduled air service at Casper–Natrona County International Airport, a former army air base built during World War II. The runways are large, having been built for bombers. It replaced a regional airport north of Casper which later became the town of Bar Nunn, Wyoming. The airport is located west of the city just off of US Highway 20/26. In July 2004, the airport facilities were renovated. Passenger service at the airport is offered by United Express (SkyWest Airlines and GoJet Airlines), and Delta Connection (SkyWest Airlines). FedEx Express and FedEx Feeder provide cargo airline service to the airport.

==== Public transit ====
Public transit in the Casper area had been provided by the Casper Area Transportation Coalition but is now offered by the city of Casper as Casper Area Transit. They offer fixed route service called Casper Area LINK and an on-request service called ASSIST from Monday to Saturday.

==== Scheduled bus service ====
Scheduled bus service once offered by Power River Bus Lines is now offered by ExpressArrow (formerly Black Hills Stages).

==== Rail ====
The Union Pacific line terminates at Casper. The line previously extended to Lander.

== Notable people ==
- John Barrasso (born 1952), Republican U.S. Senator from Wyoming
- Zane Beadles (born 1986), football player
- C. J. Box (born 1958), author
- Tom Brewer (born 1958), member of the Nebraska Legislature
- Tom Browning (born 1960), baseball player
- Taven Bryan (born 1996), professional football player
- Charles K. Bucknum, US military officer, politician, businessman
- Dick Cheney (1941-2025), US vice-president, Secretary of Defense
- Liz Cheney (born 1966), lawyer and politician; daughter of Dick Cheney
- Lynne Cheney (born 1941), wife of former Vice President Dick Cheney
- Tom Coburn (1948–2020), U.S. Senator from Oklahoma
- Barbara Cubin (born 1946), politician
- Mike Devereaux (born 1963), professional baseball player
- Ron Franscell (born 1957), journalist, crime author
- Mary Meyer Gilmore (born 1947), politician
- Rick Koerber (born 1973), businessman and convicted fraudster
- Marlan Scully (born 1939), physicist
- Matthew Scully (born 1959), author, speechwriter
- Matthew Shepard (1976-1998), murder victim and namesake of the Matthew Shepard Hate Crime Act
- Jeffree Star, makeup artist, media personality and singer-songwriter
- Patrick Joseph Sullivan politician
- Floyd Volker (1921–1995), professional basketball player
- Pete Williams (born 1952), journalist
- Logan Wilson (born 1996), football player

== Partner city ==
- Várpalota, Hungary
