= Townsend =

Townsend or Townshend may refer to:

== Places ==
=== United States ===
- Camp Townsend, National Guard training base in Peekskill, New York
- Townsend, Delaware
- Townsend, Georgia
- Townsend, Massachusetts, a New England town
  - Townsend (CDP), Massachusetts, the main village in the town
  - Townsend Harbor, Massachusetts, another village in the town
- Townsend, Montana
- Townsend Township, Huron County, Ohio
- Townsend Township, Sandusky County, Ohio
- Townsend, Tennessee
- Townsend, Wisconsin, a town
- Townsend (community), Wisconsin, an unincorporated community
- Townshend, Vermont, a New England town
  - Townshend (CDP), Vermont, the main village in the town
- Port Townsend, Washington
  - Port Townsend Bay
  - Port Townsend Film Festival

=== Canada ===
- Townsend Township, Ontario
- Townsend, Ontario
- Townsend Lake, Saskatchewan

=== United Kingdom ===
- Townsend, Buckinghamshire
- Townshend, Cornwall
- Townsend, Bournemouth, Dorset
- Townsend, Poulshot, Wiltshire
- Townsend, Kingswinford, an area at the end of the village of Kingswinford in the West Midlands
- Townsend Industrial Estate in Houghton Regis, near Dunstable in Bedfordshire
- Several other locations in England, and one in Wales

=== New Zealand ===
- Townsend Observatory

=== Australia ===
- Mount Townsend (Snowy Mountains), the second-highest peak in mainland Australia
- the name of Marburg, Queensland for a brief period during World War 1

== Buildings and structures ==
- Townsend Central Public School, Norfolk County, Ontario, Canada
- Townsend Hotel (Birmingham, Michigan)
- Townsend Hotel (Casper, Wyoming), a NRHP-listed property
- Townshend International School, Hluboká nad Vltavou, Czech Republic
- Townsend Building (disambiguation), several buildings
- James W. Townsend House (Orange Springs, Florida)
- James W. Townsend House (Lake Butler, Florida)

== History ==
- Townshend Acts, proposed by Charles Townshend, Chancellor of the Exchequer, that placed a tax on common import goods and which fomented resentment of the British in the Thirteen Colonies

== Science ==
- Townsend discharge
- Townsend (unit)

== Other uses ==
- Townsend (name)
- Mount Townsend (disambiguation)
- Townsend and Townsend and Crew, law firm established in 1860, based in San Francisco, California
- Townsend Thoresen, past ferry operator, now named P&O Ferries
- Townsend v. Sain, a US Supreme Court case about habeas corpus and truth serums, decided in 1963
- Townsends, a historical YouTube channel
