= Townsend Hotel =

Townsend Hotel may refer to:

- Townsend Hotel (Birmingham, Michigan), a hotel in Detroit
- Townsend Hotel (Casper, Wyoming), an NRHP-listed property in Wyoming

== See also ==
- Townsend (disambiguation)
