= Townsend Township =

Townsend Township may refer to the following places:

In Canada

- Townsend Township, Ontario (historical, in Norfolk County)

In the United States

- Townsend Township, Huron County, Ohio
- Townsend Township, Sandusky County, Ohio

See also

- Townsend (disambiguation)
