= Tribune Building =

Tribune Building may refer to:

- New York Tribune Building
- Tribune Building (South Bend, Indiana), listed on the National Register of Historic Places in St. Joseph County, Indiana
- Tribune Building (Tulsa, Oklahoma), listed on the National Register of Historic Places in Tulsa County, Oklahoma
- Tribune Building (Salt Lake City, Utah), listed on the National Register of Historic Places in Salt Lake City, Utah
- Tribune Building (Casper, Wyoming), listed on the National Register of Historic Places in Natrona County, Wyoming
- Tribune Tower in Chicago, Illinois
- Tribune Tower (Oakland) in Oakland, California (formerly called Tribune Building)
