= Registry Building =

Building in Christchurch, New Zealand

Coordinates: 43°31′52″S 172°37′49″E

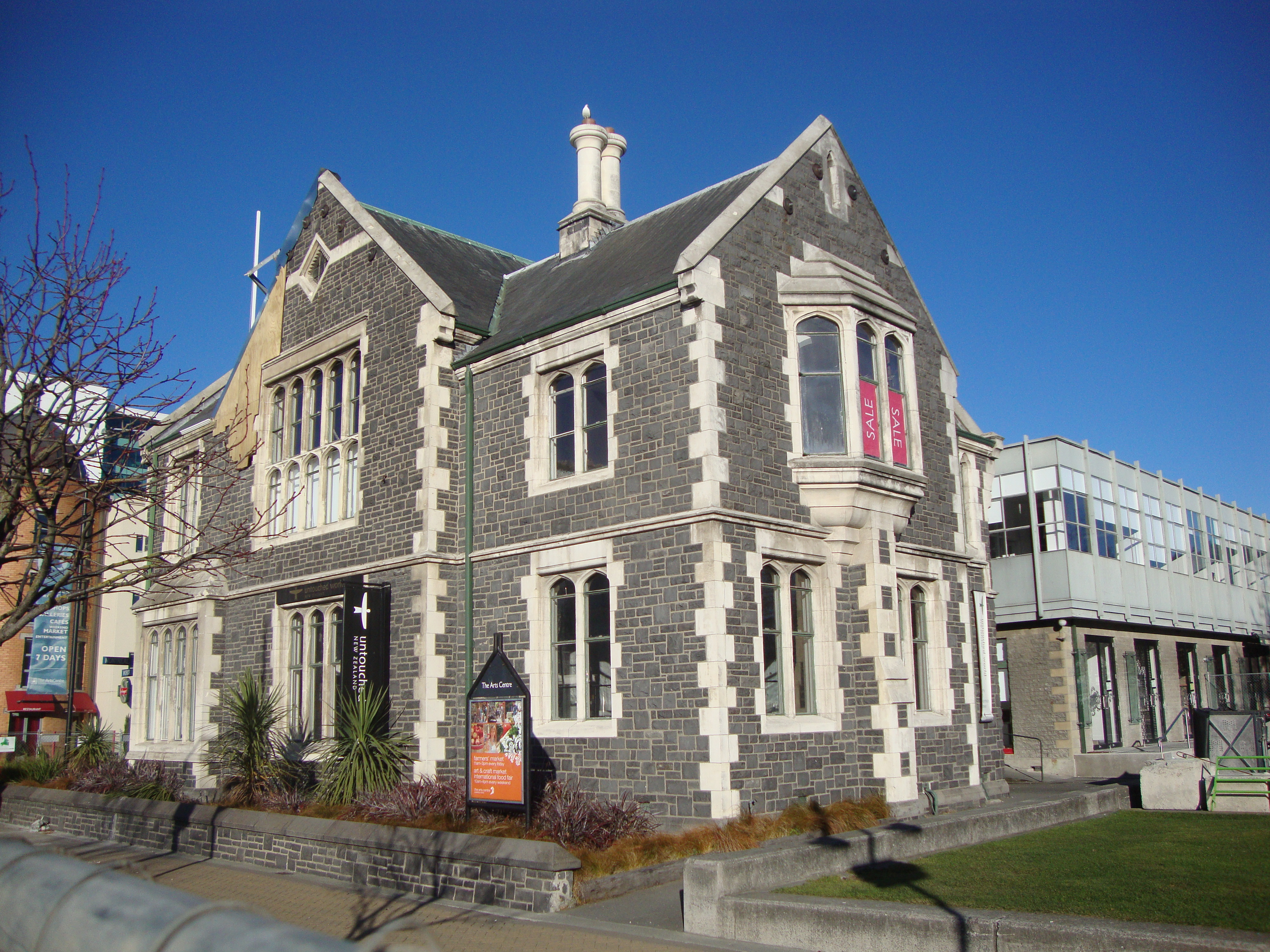
The Registry Building in July 2011

The Registry Building belongs to the Christchurch Arts Centre in the Christchurch Central City of Christchurch, New Zealand. It is covered by a Category I registration by Heritage New Zealand that is separate to the Category I registration that covers the buildings in the western part of the block, and the Category II registration that applies to the former Student Union building. Designed by Collins and Harman, the Registry Building was constructed in 1916 and an extension was added ten years later. After the 2011 Christchurch earthquake, 22 of the historic buildings were red stickered (meaning no access was allowed at all). The Registry Building was the first one to be restored, and it reopened in July 2013.
