= Christchurch Arts Centre =

Community centre in Christchurch, New Zealand

Coordinates: 43°31′53.33″S 172°37′41.64″E

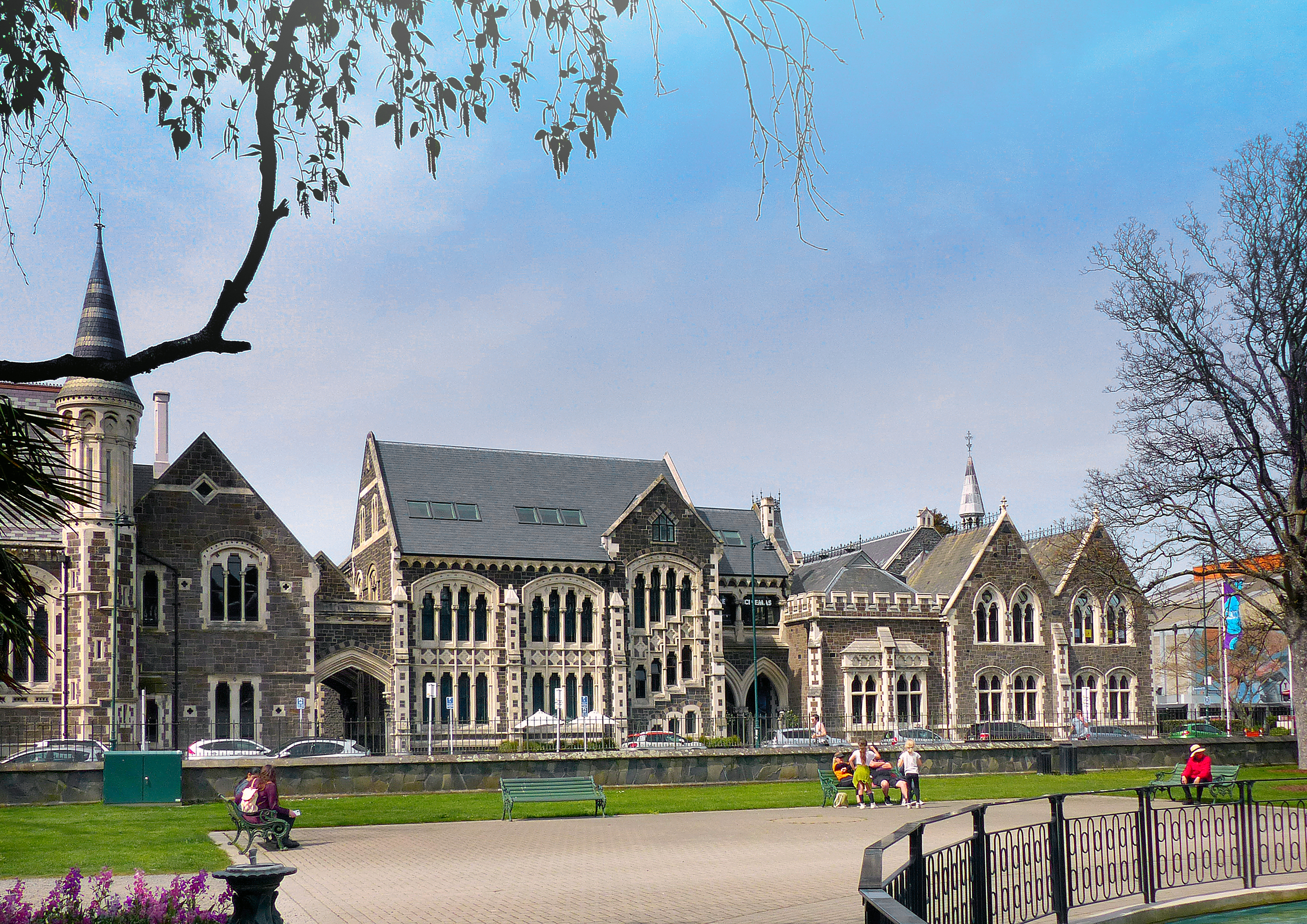
- Clock Tower, Great Hall and Classics buildings

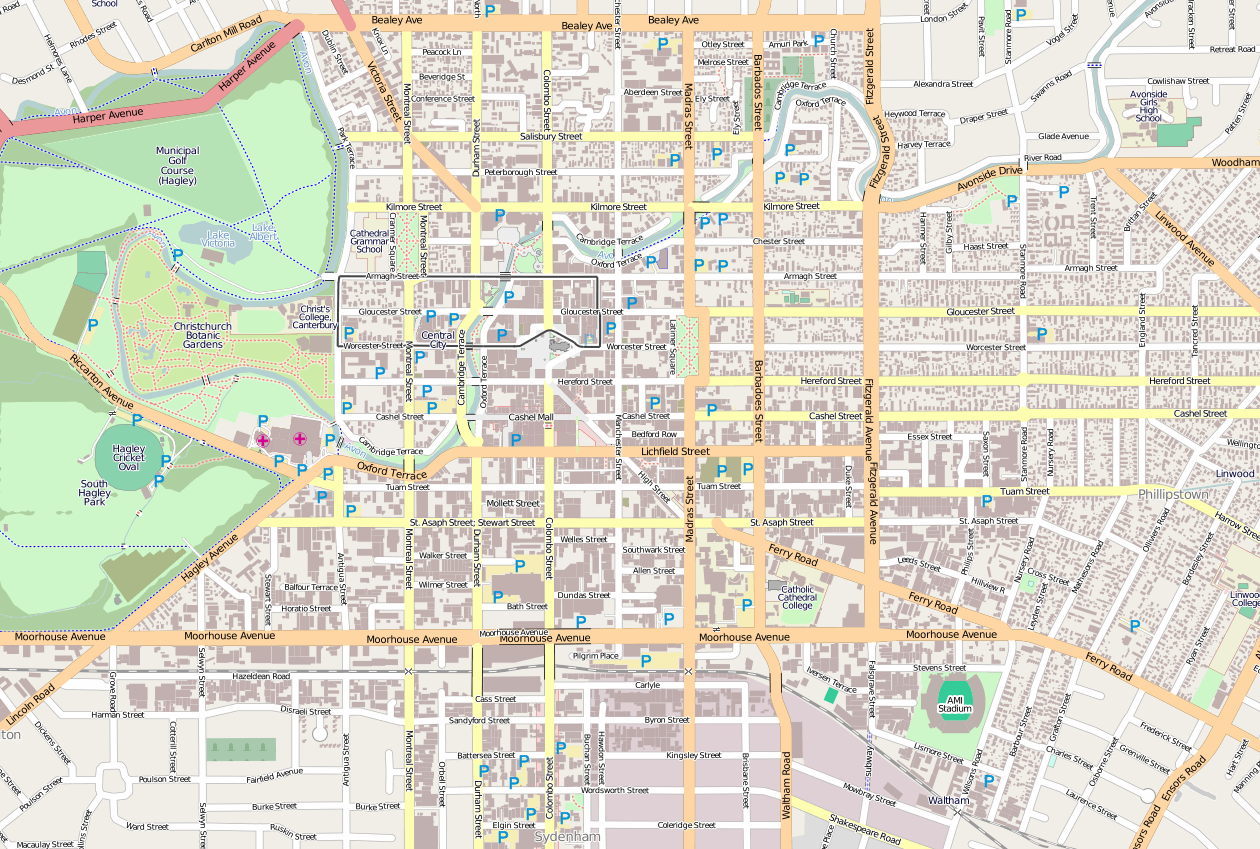
- Location within Christchurch
- Former names: Canterbury College, Christchurch Arts Centre

General information
- Type: Arts, culture, education, creativity and entrepreneurship
- Architectural style: Gothic Revival
- Location: 2 Worcester Boulevard, Christchurch, New Zealand
- Inaugurated: 1878 (first building)
- Owner: The Arts Centre of Christchurch Trust Board

Design and construction
- Architects: Benjamin Mountfort; Samuel Hurst Seager
- Awards: UNESCO Asia-Pacific Awards for Cultural Heritage Conservation Award of Merit

Website
- https://www.artscentre.org.nz/

Heritage New Zealand – Category 1
- Designated: 15 February 1990
- Reference no.: 7301

The Christchurch Arts Centre, also known as The Arts Centre Te Matatiki Toi Ora, is a hub for arts, culture, education, creativity and entrepreneurship in Christchurch, New Zealand. It is located in the Gothic Revival former Canterbury College (now the University of Canterbury), Christchurch Boys' High School and Christchurch Girls' High School buildings, many of which were designed by Benjamin Mountfort. The centre is New Zealand's largest collection of category one heritage buildings with 21 of the 23 buildings covered by Heritage New Zealand listings. The Arts Centre of Christchurch Trust Board formed in 1978 and ownership of the site was transferred to the trust from the University of Canterbury to the Christchurch Arts Centre in 1979.

The centre, which is held in trust for the people of Canterbury and its visitors, has been undergoing a large restoration since it was badly damaged in the 2011 Christchurch earthquake. Buildings are progressively reopening to the public as they are strengthened and repaired and more than two-thirds of the buildings have reopened.

== History ==
The Arts Centre comprises 22 heritage buildings located in central Christchurch, in the block bounded by Rolleston Avenue, Worcester Boulevard, Montreal Street and Hereford Street. These have been the subject of several listings by Heritage New Zealand (formerly Historic Places Trust).

- Registration 4907; effective 26 November 1981. Category II listing; Arts Centre of Christchurch Old Student Union Building (University of Canterbury Former).
- Registration 7301; effective February 15, 1990. Category I listing, Arts Centre of Christchurch covering the western part of the arts centre.
- Registration 7373; effective February 13, 1997. Category I listing, Registry Building.
- Expanded registration 7301, effective September 7, 2025. Category I listing, Te Matatiki Toi Ora The Arts Centre. This covers the entire Arts Centre block including the Student Union and Registry buildings, and replaces the earlier listings.

In late 2025, Heritage New Zealand proposed that the Arts Centre be included as a National Historic Landmark..

The buildings are also listed in the Christchurch City Plan as heritage items. In the previous plan, 20 buildings were listed as Group 1 or 2, and three buildings were listed as Group 3. There are just two modern buildings on the site, with the Registry Additions built in 1957 and extended in 1967 and not listed under the old city plan, although it was proposed by the Christchurch City Council to include it in the listing with the historic registry building.

=== Return of the university ===
In 2009 strong debate emerged over a proposal to use the Arts Centre car park located off Hereford Street for the University of Canterbury's School of Music. Proponents valued the additional vibrancy that this would bring into the Cultural Precinct, and supported the university moving back to their original site. Opponents felt that the proposed building was out of scale with the existing Arts Centre and that the building design would detract from the heritage value. Ultimately the proposal was abandoned after a successful campaign by Save our Arts Centre, a group led by Richard Sinke.

In May 2017, the University of Canterbury returned to its former site. It opened two departments in the restored old Chemistry building – the classics and music school. Which now makes up the city campus of the university. Some 400 students transferred from the Ilam campus to the central city facility. the building also houses the Teece Museum of Classical Antiquities which showcases the James Logie Memorial Collection, a collection of Greek, Roman, Egyptian and Near Eastern artefacts in New Zealand.

=== Earthquakes and recovery ===
In the early hours of 4 September 2010, a major earthquake caused extensive damage throughout the Canterbury region. The historic buildings were damaged – collapsing chimneys damaged the Great Hall, the Observatory Tower and the Clock Tower. The Arts Centre director Ken Franklin commented that prior measures taken to reinforce the buildings may have prevented additional damage. The buildings had been insured for NZ$95 million, and this was increased to NZ$120m in January 2011.

The buildings were very badly damaged in the 22 February 2011 Christchurch earthquake, but no people were hurt at the centre. All historic buildings became inaccessible to the public and the entire complex was closed until the first restored and strengthened building, The Registry Building reopened in 2013.

It was initially estimated the cost to repair the buildings would be $100m. This was later revised to more than $200m and estimated to take 15 years to accomplish. In July 2012, it was announced that André Lovatt had been secured as its new chief executive, tasking him with the restoration project; Lovatt started in October 2012. Under Lovatt's guidance, the programme was accelerated although with the scope becoming better known, the costs escalated to $290m making it one of the largest heritage restoration projects in the world.

While a significant amount of the restoration has been paid for, there is still a substantial shortfall in funds to complete it and the charitable trust is actively fundraising with the next stage to include the $10m restoration of the Observatory Tower and the restoration of the Physics, Biology and Engineering buildings. The Physics and Biology buildings will become home to a boutique hotel. The Observatory Hotel opened in the restored Townsend Observatory in 2022.

The first buildings to reopen after the earthquake were Registry, Registry Additions and The Gym with Registry reopening in July 2013. The Great Hall opened in June 2016.

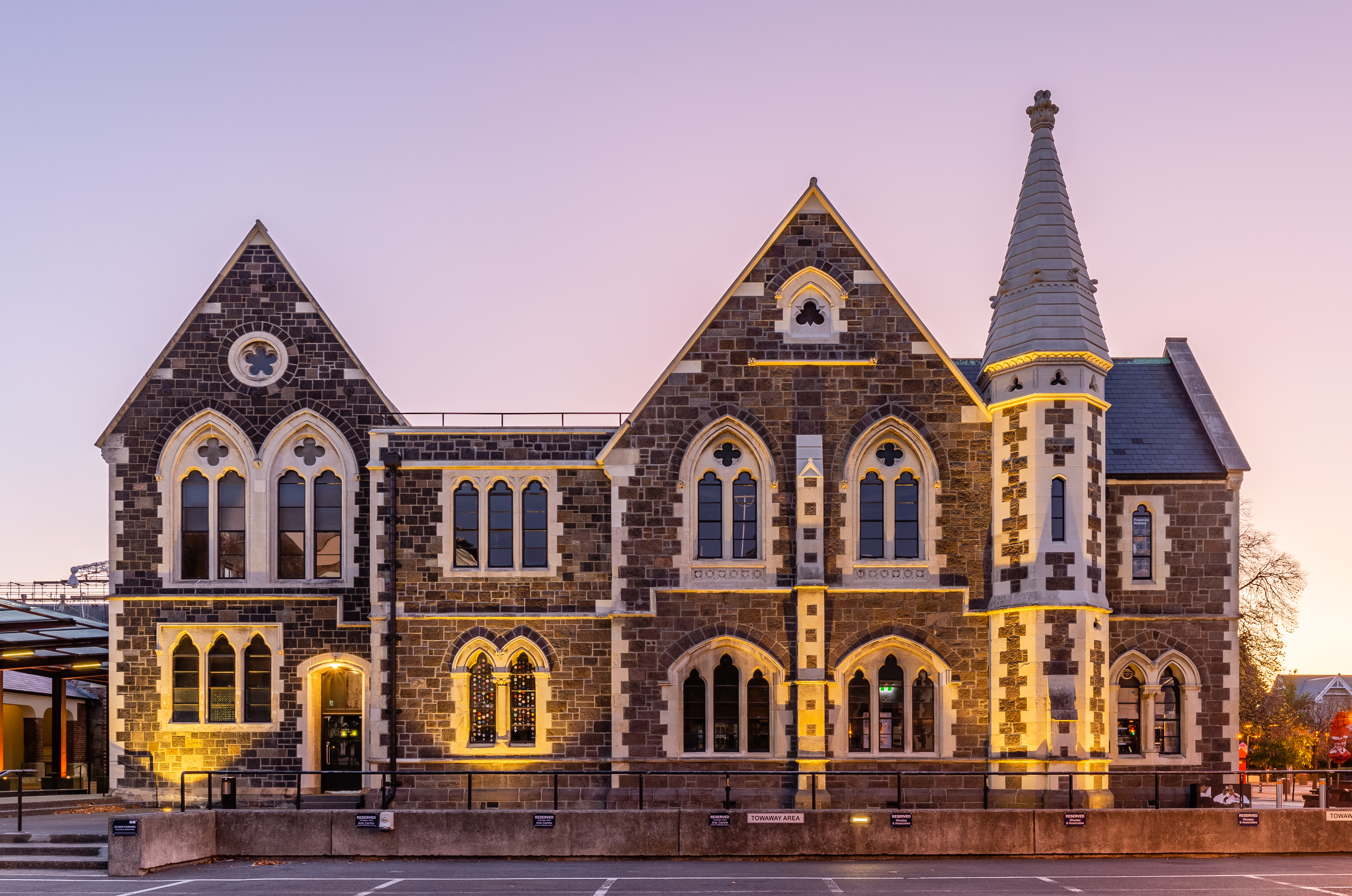
Christchurch Arts Centre, 2020

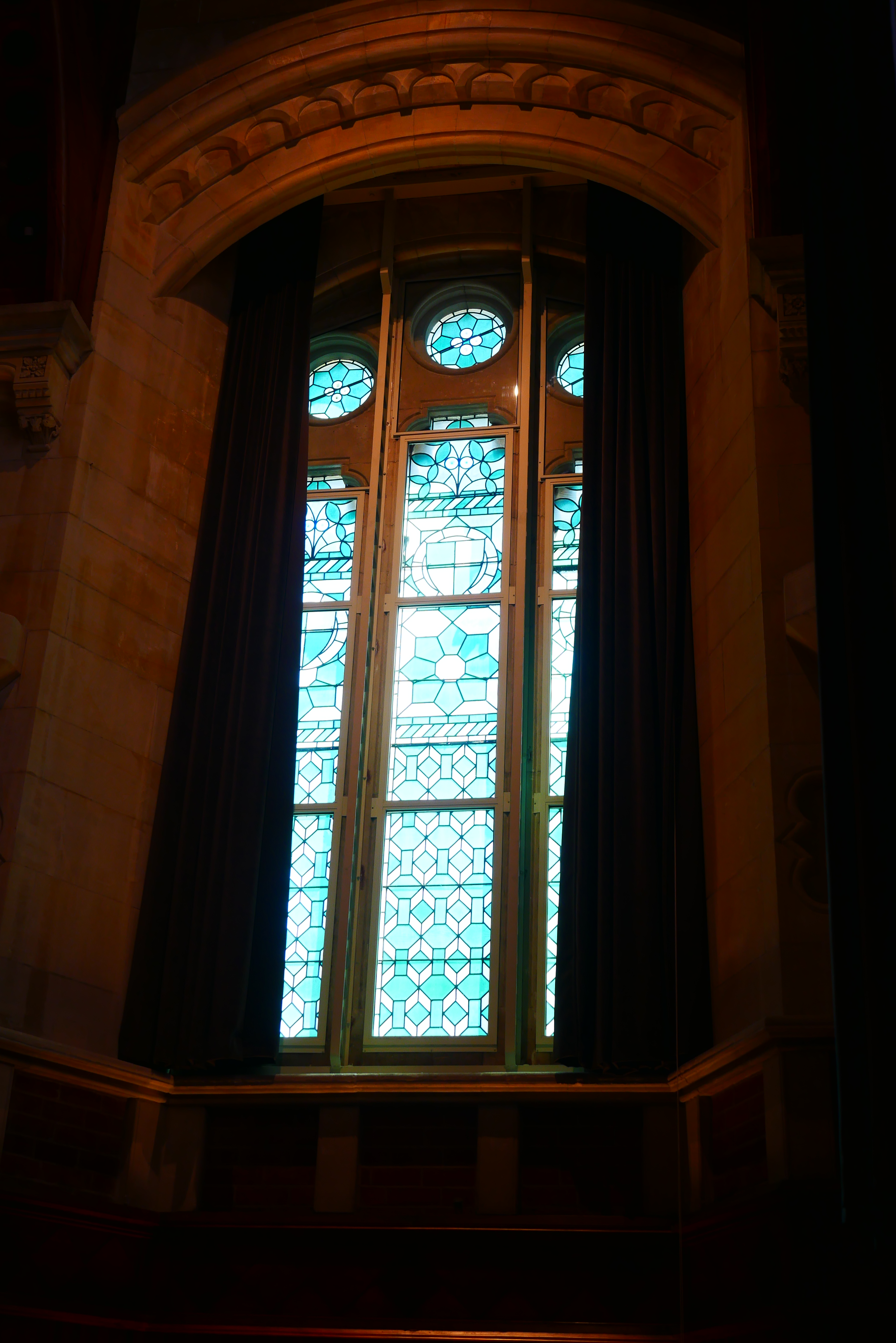
English stained glass window, 2019

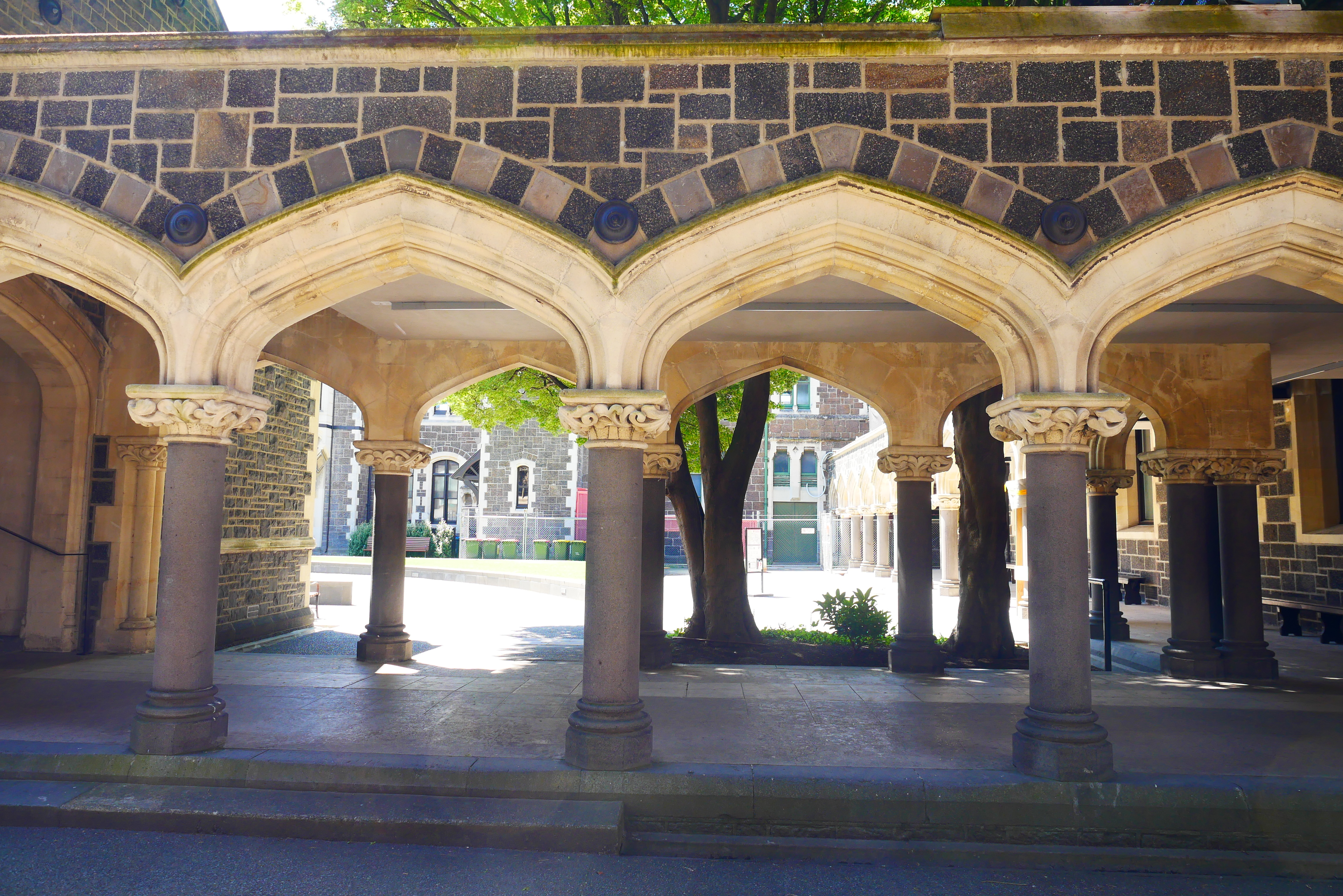
Archways on outside of building, 2019

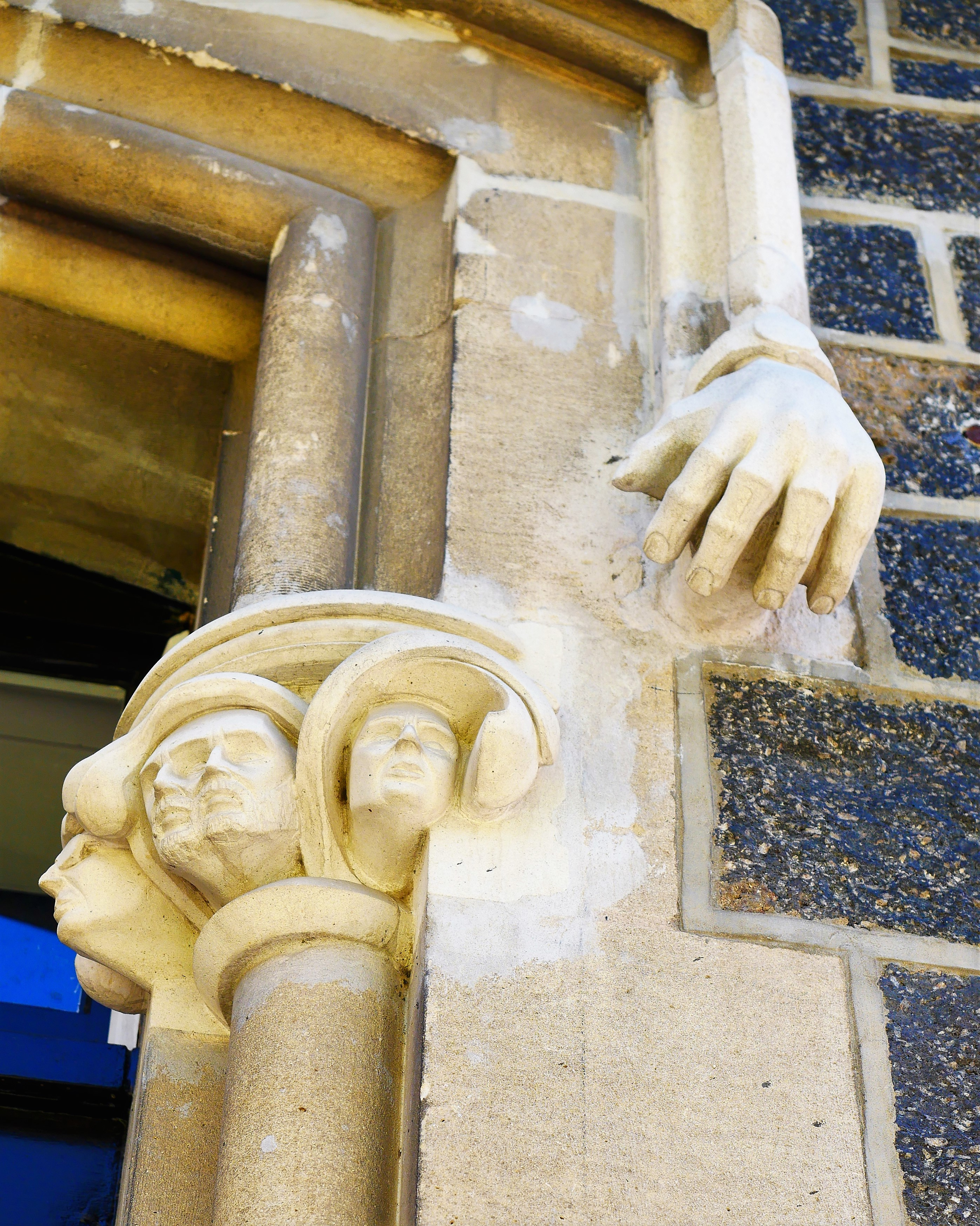
English hands and faces on window surrounds, 2020

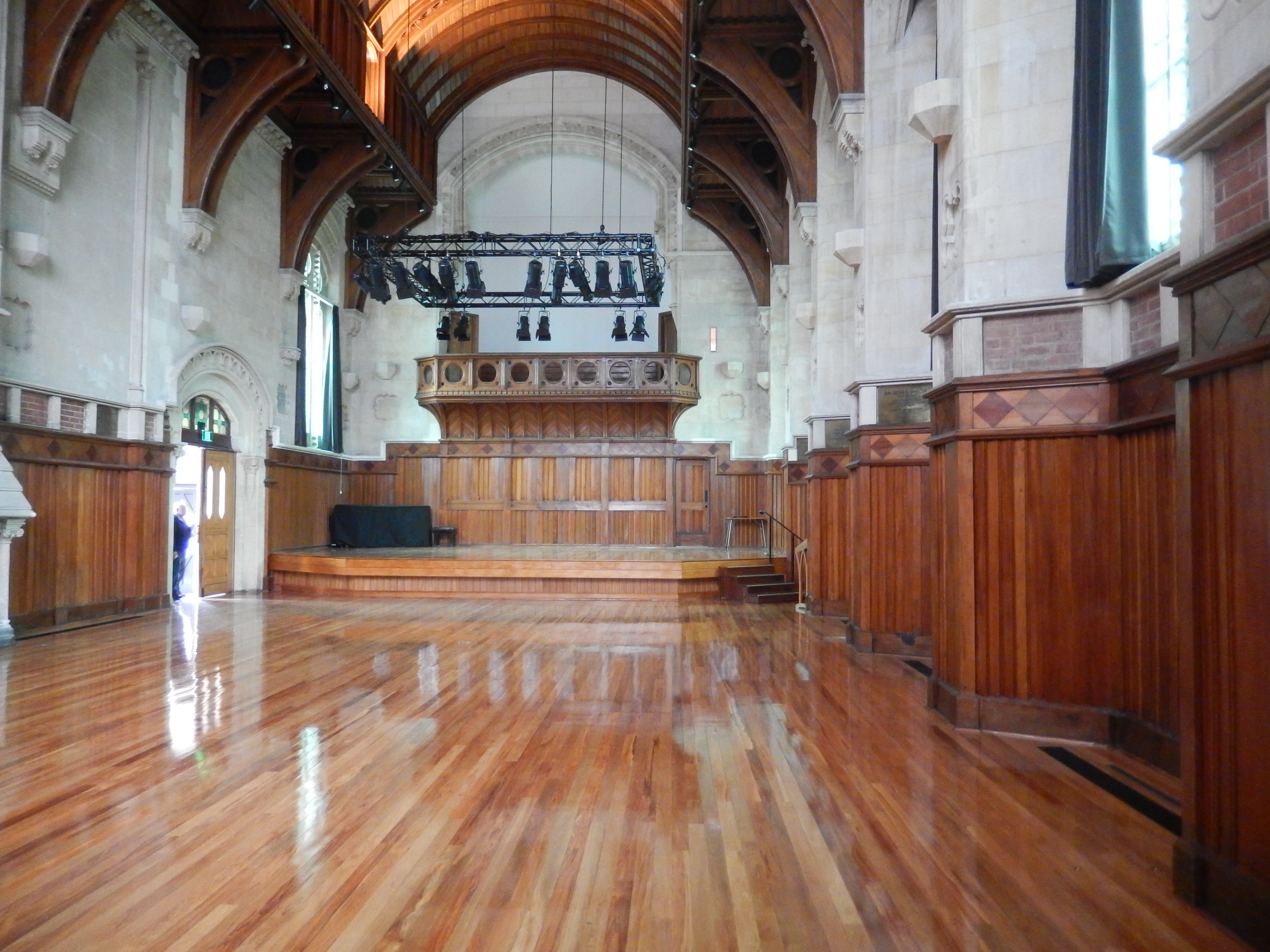
Inside the Great Hall 2016

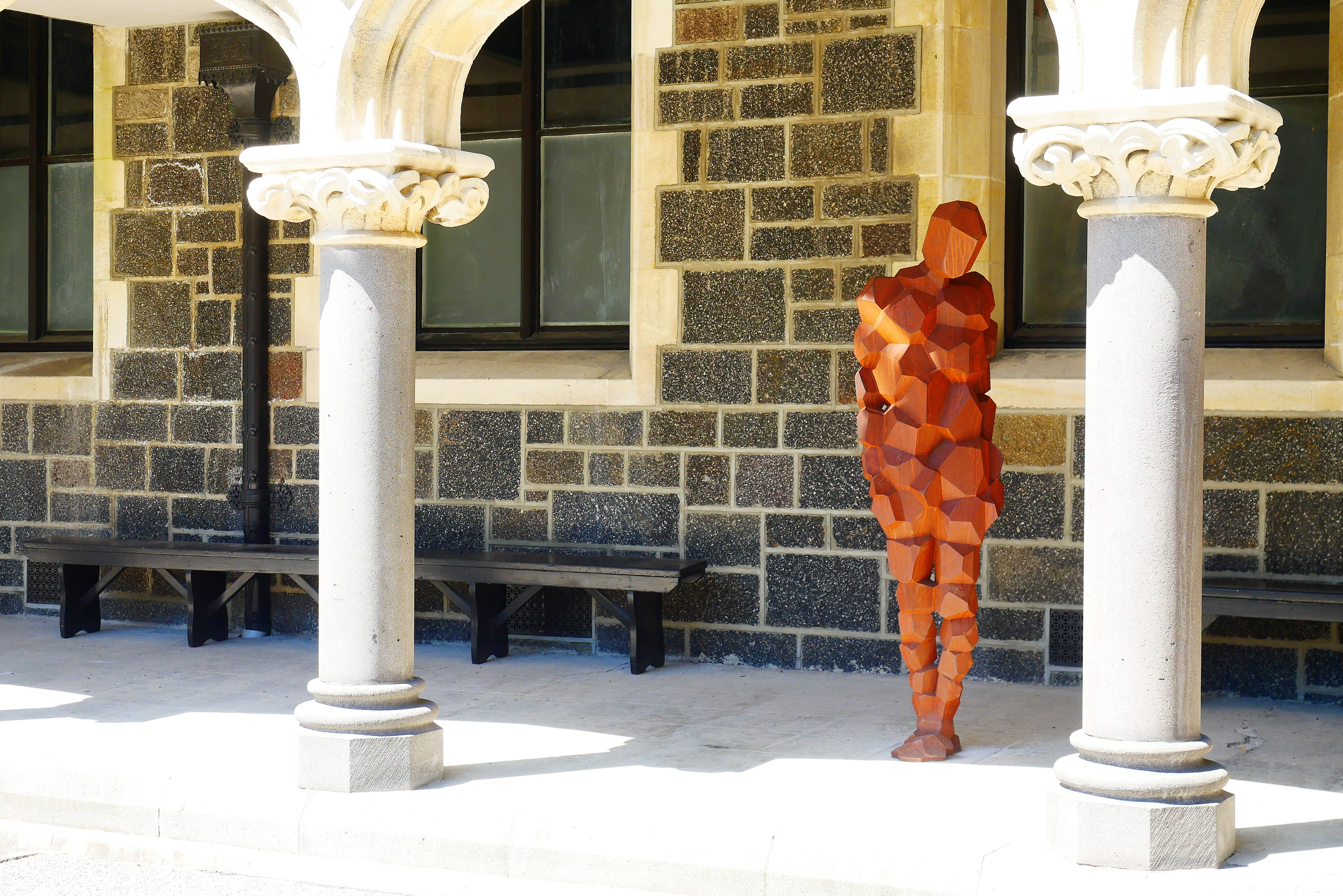
Sculpture in the inner court 2019

== Usage ==
The restored buildings are home to museums, including Rutherford's Den, where the father of nuclear physics Ernest, Lord Rutherford studied while at Canterbury College and the University of Canterbury's Teece Museum of Classical Antiquities, as well as boutique art galleries, eateries, retailers and offices.

The centre also hosts many special arts and cultural events, including a weekly market, and it has beautiful buildings and rooms available to hire. From 29 November to 1 December 2019, it hosted the NZ Skeptics Conference.

Before the 2011 earthquake many artists and arts organisations and businesses had (some for many decades) made the Arts Centre their home including SCAPE Public Art, Southern Ballet, Dux de Lux, Academy Cinema, Cave Rock Gallery, SoFA Gallery, Annie's Wine Bar, Gingko Print Workshop/Salamander Gallery, Free Theatre Christchurch and The Court Theatre.

The Twelve Local Heroes is a series of bronze busts located on Worcester Boulevard outside The Arts Centre to commemorate twelve local Christchurch people who were prominent in their respective fields in the latter part of the 20th century. They are currently unavailable as the building adjacent to it is awaiting restoration.

== Governance ==
The Christchurch Arts Centre Association Incorporated was created in 1974, when the University of Canterbury completed its move to its new Ilam campus. The Arts Centre of Christchurch Trust Board formed in 1978 and ownership of the site was transferred to the trust in 1979.

The Arts Centre is governed by a charitable trust board. It relies solely on donations as it receives no ongoing funding from central or local governments. Its chief executive is Philip Aldridge, who took over the role in mid-2018 after the departure of André Lovatt.

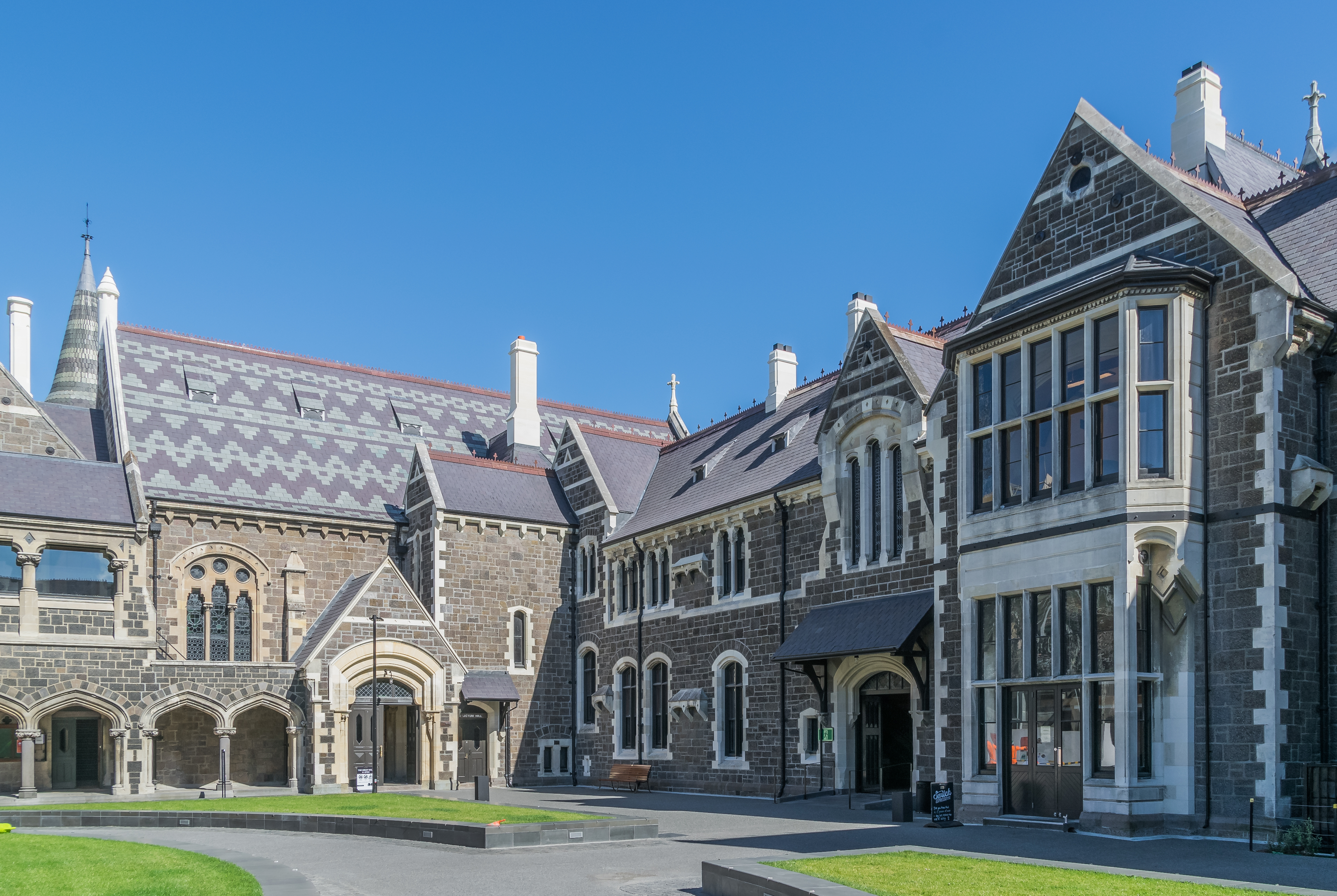
The North Quad at the Arts Centre featuring the Great Hall, Classics and Clock Tower buildings.

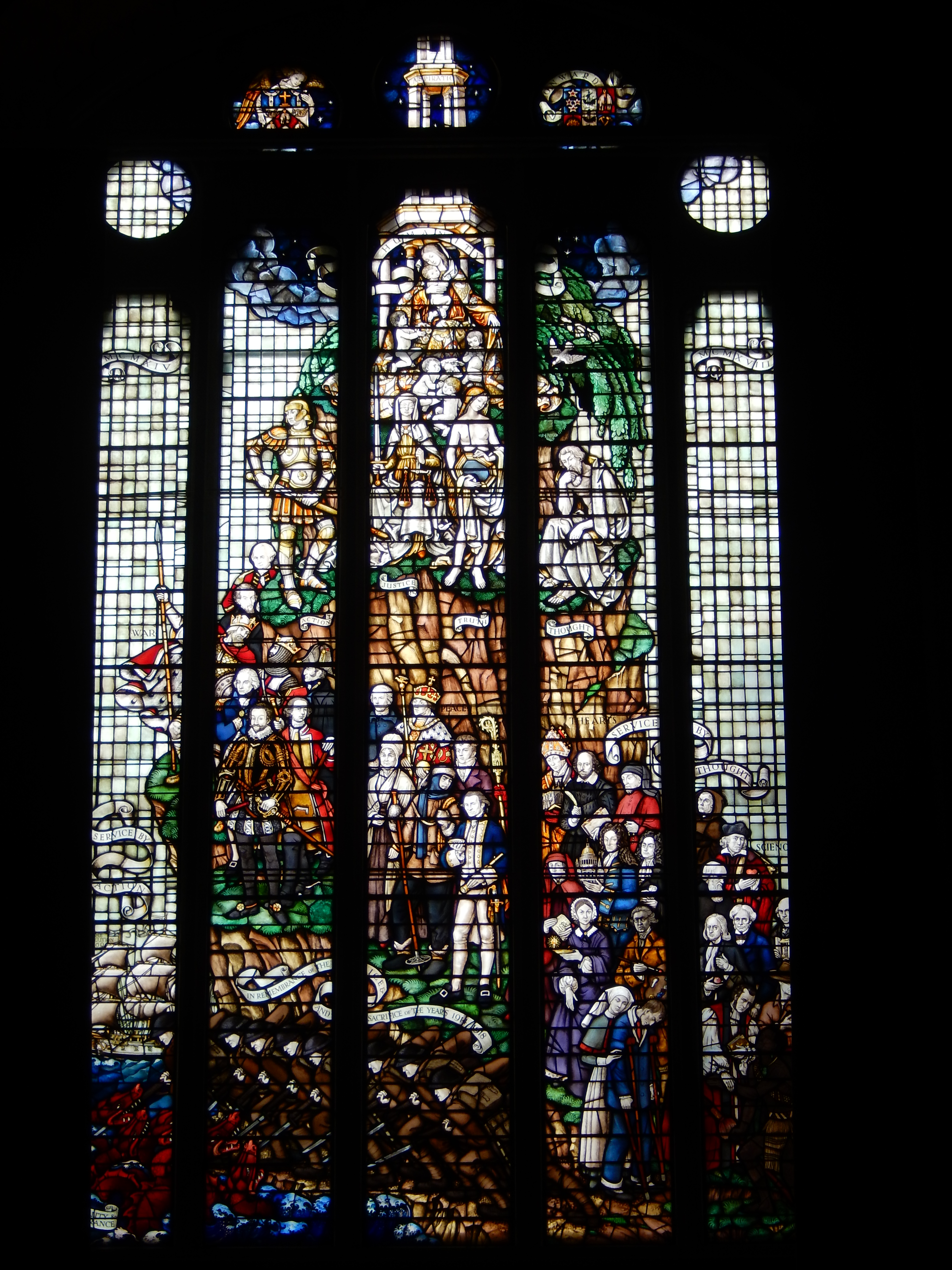
The Great Hall Memorial Window at the Arts Centre te Matatiki Toi Ora.

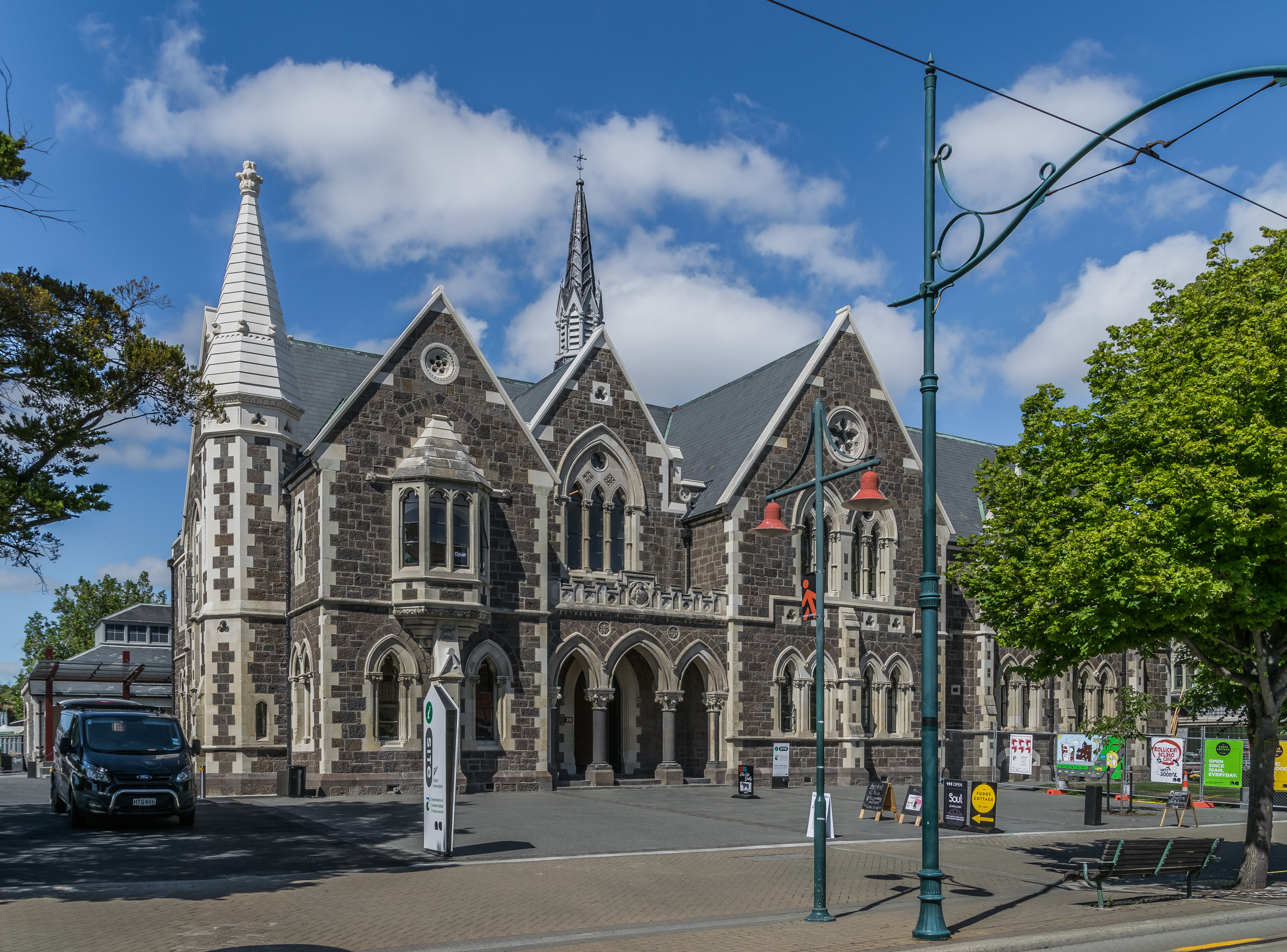
Boys' High building at the Arts Centre

== See also ==
- List of oldest buildings in Christchurch
