= Elks Lodge No. 1353 =

- U.S. National Register of Historic Places
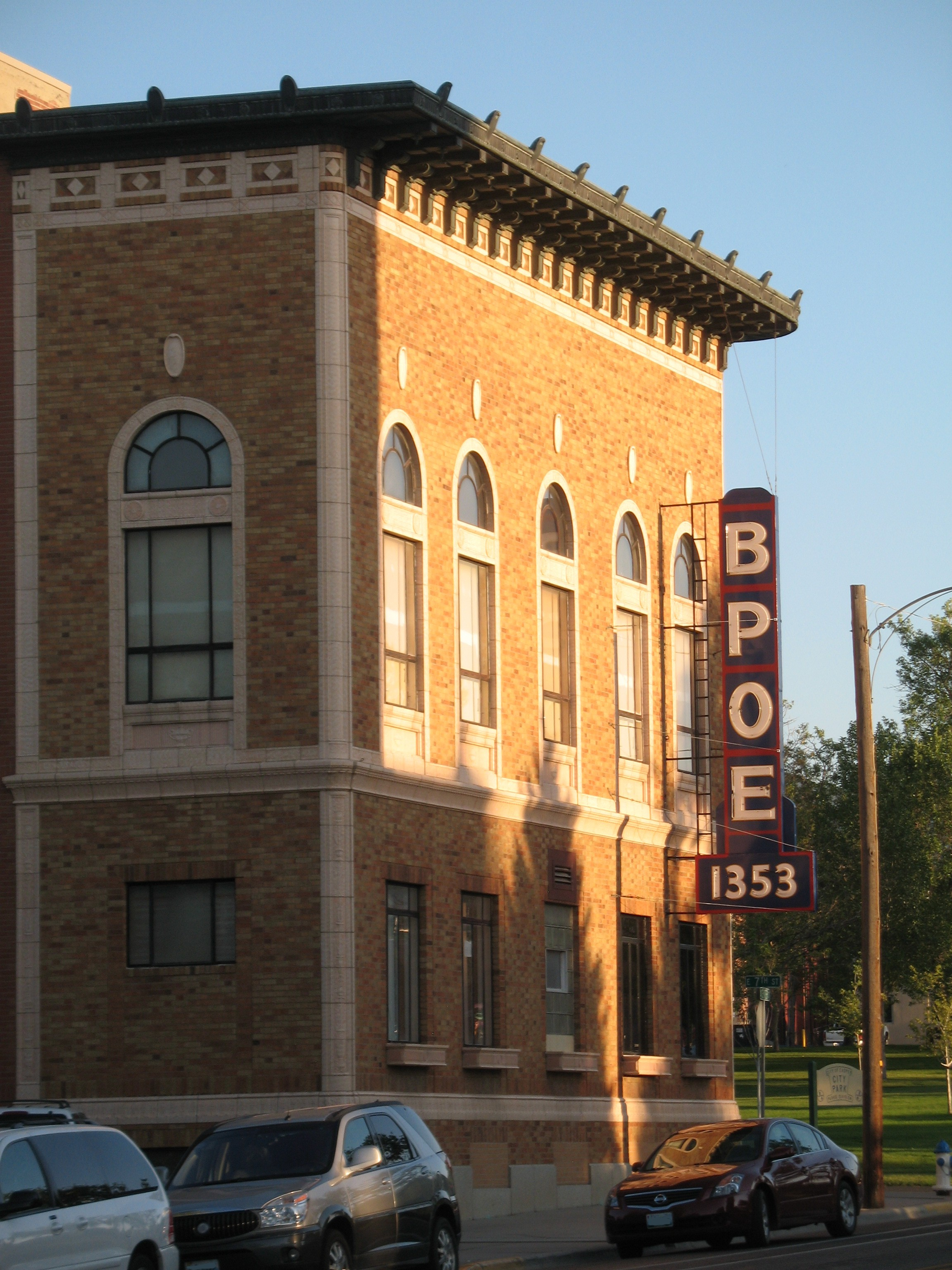
- West facade, 2012.

- Location within Wyoming Location within the United States
- Location: 108 E. 7th St., Casper, Wyoming
- Coordinates: 42°50′38″N 106°19′27″W
- Area: less than one acre
- Built: 1922
- Architect: Garbutt, Weidner & Sweeney, et al
- Architectural style: Renaissance
- MPS: Buildings Designed by Garbutt, Weidner, and Sweeney in Casper MPS
- NRHP reference No.: 96001632
- Added to NRHP: January 30, 1997

The Elks Lodge No. 1353 is a historic building located in Casper, Wyoming. It was built in 1922 and listed on the National Register of Historic Places in 1997.

== Description ==
The lodge is a two-story rectangular brick edifice at the northeast corner of East 7th St. and South Center St. It also has a basement, the upper half of which is situated above street level. Both sides of the building facing a street are brown brick with terra cotta trim; the remaining exterior walls are red brick devoid of terra cotta embellishments. The structure features an arched central entryway topped by a shallow terra cotta balcony. The lower-floor windows are rectangular and evenly spaced. The second story is visually divided from the first by a terra cotta belt course. The second-story windows, also evenly spaced, are arched. Below these are recessed terra cotta panels. The building is topped with an ornate cornice that gracefully wraps around three corners of the building. The basement is also visually defined by windows along the sidewalk at ground level. Many of these windows have now been closed up with brick.

Inside, the building originally could claim a ballroom, dining area, and numerous other rooms in varying styles; however, extensive remodeling has taken place since the building's construction. Remaining is the ballroom/auditorium's hardwood floor, which was refinished circa 1990. Although the lodge's general floor plan has remained generally unchanged, very little original material still exists from the original construction.

== History ==
The Elks Lodge No. 1353 was built in 1920-1922 by architects Garbutt, Weidner & Sweeney. It was designed in the Renaissance style and features the firm's signature use of terra cotta ornamentation. The lot was bought for $14,500, and the building itself was constructed at the cost of $100,000 - $200,000. Cement and basement work was contracted to the Lloyd Building Company, and George W. Cottrell held the contract for the brick, granite, and terra cotta work.

The building's opening celebration was held on March 17, 1922. However, the structure was not actually finished until 1936, when a membership drive was launched for new members, providing enough money to complete construction. The lodge was remodeling in 1950 and again in 1967. A fire in the Library room in 1977 prompted further alternations to the building. Since then, numerous other changes have been made to the structure.
