= Consolidated Royalty Building =

- U.S. National Register of Historic Places
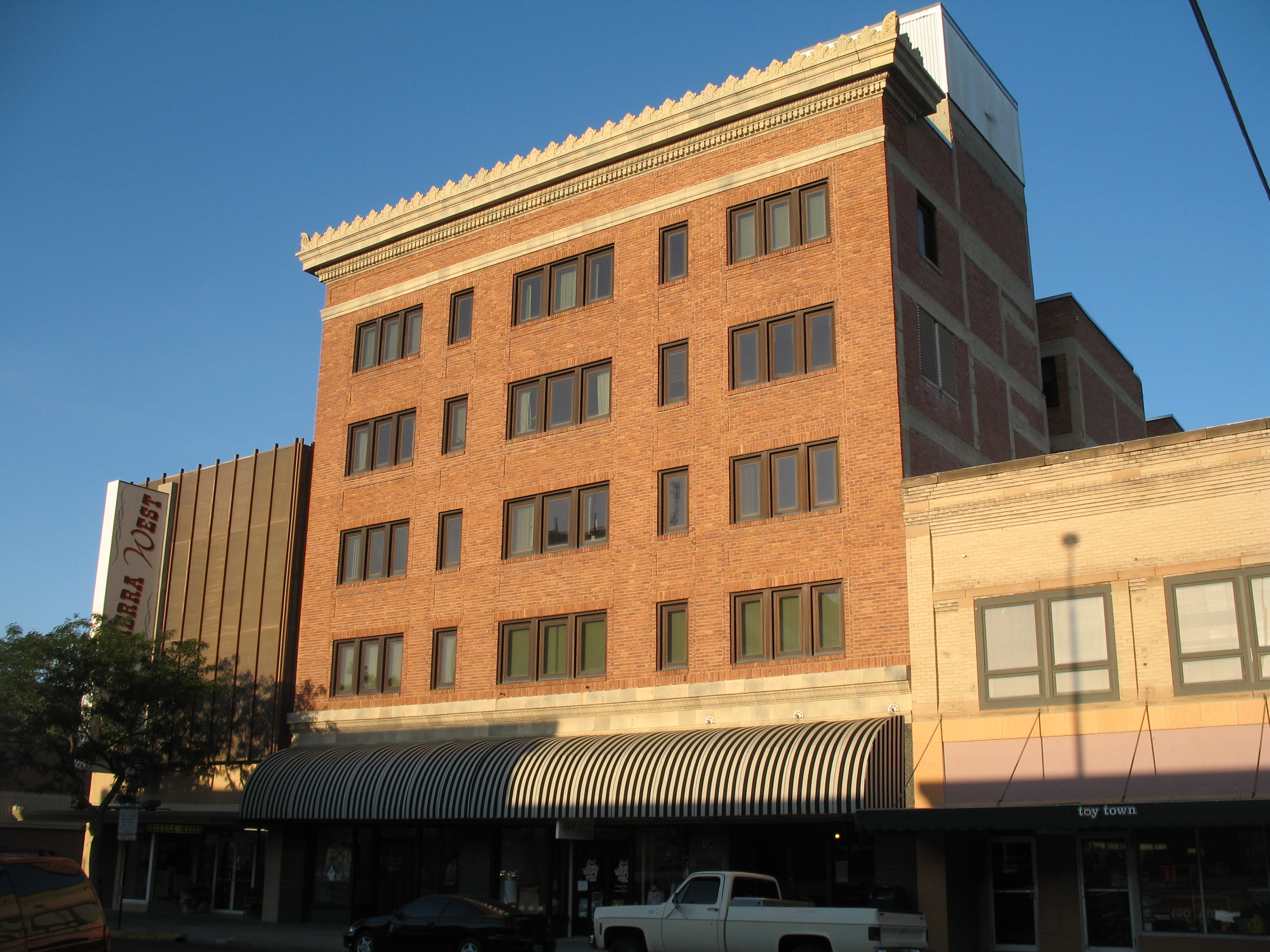

- Location within Wyoming
- Location: 137--141 S. Center St., Casper, Wyoming
- Coordinates: 42°50′57″N 106°19′27″W
- Area: less than one acre
- Built: 1917
- Architect: Garbutt and Weidner
- Architectural style: Early Commercial
- NRHP reference No.: 93001186
- Added to NRHP: November 4, 1993

The Consolidated Royalty Building, on S. Center St. in Casper, Wyoming, was built in 1917.

== Design ==
It was designed by architects Garbutt and Weidner in Early Commercial style. It has also been known as the Con Roy Building and as the Oil Exchange Building. It was listed on the National Register of Historic Places in 1993.

It is a double-H-shaped five-story building with elements of design of the early skyscrapers being built in Chicago in the late 1800s. It has a prominent terra cotta cornice and dentil molding. Its first floor has been altered and new windows on the upper floors have compromised the building's design integrity however.
