= Arthur M. Garbutt =

American architect

- Born: 1875; Rochester, New York, United States
- Died: December 31, 1953 (aged 78) near Greybull, Wyoming, United States
- Occupation: Architect

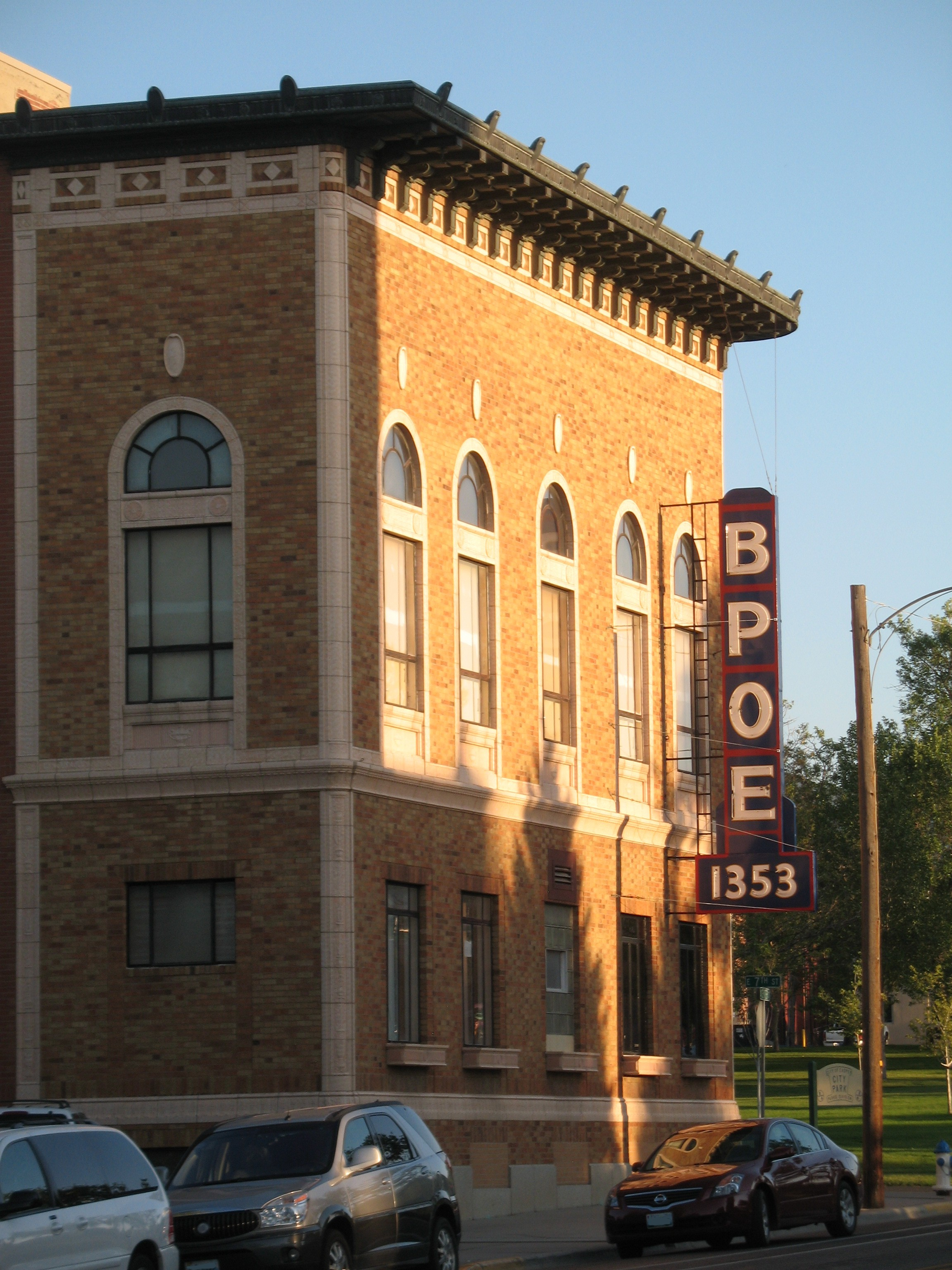
Elks Lodge, Casper, 1922.

Arthur M. Garbutt (1875 – December 31, 1953) was an American architect. From at least 1901 to 1924 he practiced architecture in Ridgway, Pennsylvania, Fort Collins, Colorado, and Casper, Wyoming. He is best known for his work completed in Casper between 1914 and 1924, when his was the dominant architectural firm in that city.

== Early life and professional career ==
Arthur M. Garbutt was born in 1875 in Rochester, New York. His obituary states that he studied architecture at the Massachusetts Institute of Technology, but there is no record of him having done so. He first appears as an architect in Ridgway, Pennsylvania, where he was located from at least July to September 1901. By December 1902 he was in Fort Collins, Colorado, where he formed the partnership of Loveland & Garbutt with Clint. J. Loveland. This partnership was dissolved in July 1903 and Garbutt continued alone. In 1910 he formed the partnership of Fuller & Garbutt with Montezuma Fuller. This was dissolved in February 1912, and Garbutt briefly moved to Portland, Oregon, where he worked for architect E. E. Goodwin.

He moved to Wyoming in 1913, originally dividing his time between Casper and Riverton. In 1914 he settled in Casper, then undergoing an economic boom brought upon by the oil industry. There he formed the partnership of Garbutt & Weidner with Charles T. Weidner, a Pennsylvania native. In the fall of 1919 they were joined by James P. Sweeney, formerly a member of the firm of Meanor & Sweeney in Huntington, West Virginia. By March he had become a member of the partnership, and the firm was renamed Garbutt, Weidner & Sweeney. During the oil boom years, Garbutt's firm was the most prominent in the city. Oil production reached its peak in 1923 and declined thereafter. With the economy slowing, Garbutt retired from the firm in 1924 to manage his real estate, shortly after contracts were let for the firm's last major work, the Natrona County High School (1926). Weidner & Sweeney continued, but was dissolved after Sweeney and Weidner moved to Seattle in December 1925 and March 1926, respectively. Their moves roughly coincided with the completion of the high school, which was occupied in January 1926.

By the winter of 1926-27 the economy was in such a state that Garbutt could not sell his property for any price, and instead sold it in a trade for a ranch near Worland in the Bighorn Basin, to which he and his wife moved. In 1933 Garbutt was employed as a Public Works Administration (PWA) inspector and was responsible for supervising the construction of PWA projects throughout the state. He resigned in June 1938. During World War II he was based at Fort Francis E. Warren as an architectural engineer with the United States Army Corps of Engineers. In that role he was involved in wartime construction projects including the Heart Mountain Relocation Center (1942), where Japanese Americans were incarcerated for much of the war. Shortly thereafter he retired to another ranch near Greybull, also in the Bighorn Basin, where he lived until his death.

A number of his works are listed on the United States National Register of Historic Places, including a concentration of partnership works in Casper, Wyoming.

== Personal life ==
In 1904 Garbutt was married to Emma Dickinson, a native of Ridgway, Pennsylvania, where he had formerly lived. They had five children that survived him, including three sons and two daughters. He died December 31, 1953, at his home near Greybull.

Garbutt was a charter member of the Elks lodges in Fort Collins and Casper. During his professional career in Casper, he was a member of the American Institute of Architects.

== Architectural works ==
- Casper Fire Department Station No. 1, 302 S. David St. Casper, Wyoming (Garbutt, Weidner and Sweeney), NRHP-listed
- St. Anthony's Catholic Church, 604 S. Center St. Casper, Wyoming (Garbutt, Weidner and Sweeney), NRHP-listed
- Consolidated Royalty Building, 137–141 S. Center St. Casper, Wyoming (Garbutt and Weidner), NRHP-listed
- Elks Lodge No. 1353, 108 E. 7th St. Casper, Wyoming (Garbutt, Weidner and Sweeney, et al.), NRHP-listed
- Fort Collins Armory, 314 E. Mountain Ave. Fort Collins, Colorado (Garbutt, Arthur M.), NRHP-listed
- Midwest Oil Company Hotel, 136 E. 6th St. Casper, Wyoming (Garbutt & Weidner), NRHP-listed
- Natrona County High School, 930 S. Elm St. Casper, Wyoming(Garbutt, Arthur), NRHP-listed
- Roosevelt School, 140 E. K St. Casper, Wyoming (Garbutt, Weidner and Sweeney), NRHP-listed
- Townsend Hotel, 115 N. Centre St. Casper, Wyoming (Garbutt, Weidner & Sweeny), NRHP-listed
- Tribune Building, 216 E. 2nd St. Casper, Wyoming (Garbutt, Weidner and Sweeney), NRHP-listed
