= Roosevelt School (Casper, Wyoming) =

- U.S. National Register of Historic Places
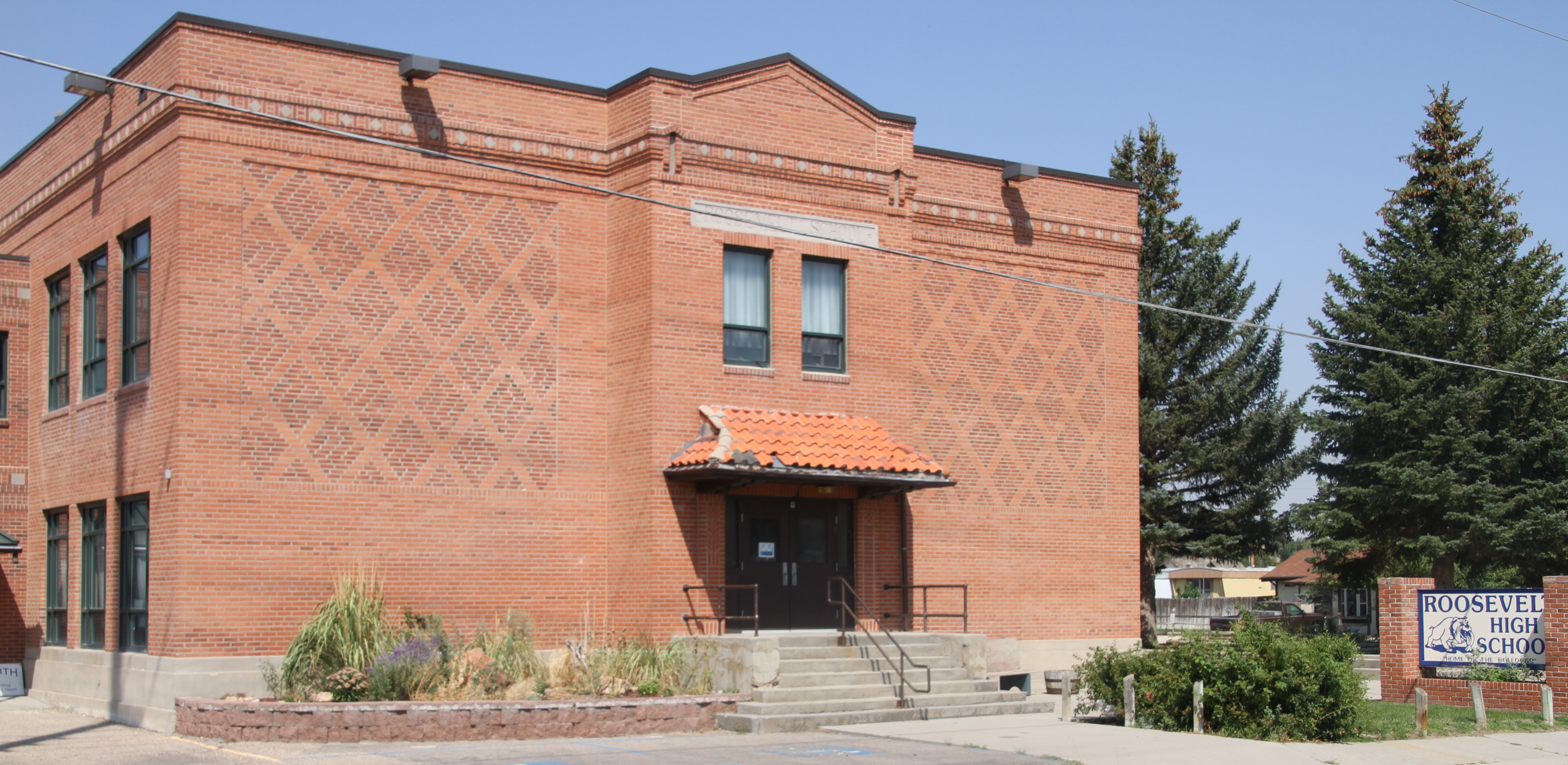
- Roosevelt school viewed from the southwest

- Location within Wyoming Location within the United States
- Location: 140 East K Street, Casper, Wyoming
- Coordinates: 42°51′41″N 106°19′26″W
- Area: less than one acre
- Built: 1922
- Architect: Garbutt, Weidner & Sweeney
- MPS: Buildings Designed by Garbutt, Weidner, and Sweeney in Casper MPS
- NRHP reference No.: 96001633
- Added to NRHP: January 30, 1997

Roosevelt School (originally North Casper School) is a former elementary school in Casper, Wyoming. It was designed by Wyoming architectural firm Garbutt, Weidner & Sweeney in 1921 and built in 1922 to accommodate a post-World War I boom in the city's economy from oil and population: the student population had increased 700%. The school served as a neighborhood center in an otherwise-neglected area of the town.

The North Casper area was across railroad tracks from the rest of Casper, and was fast-growing. In the words of Vivian Dwyer, principal of the school, it was "a district of small homes, meager means, and large families." Schooling was not available to all.

In 1921, an expansion of the existing school was planned, but instead a new building was designed and built. Only one wing of six classrooms was finished in a timely fashion, due perhaps to a union-related work stoppage. The central and north wings were completed in 1924. In 1948, the school was tied for having the smallest grounds of any school in Casper, at .86 acres. A gymnasium/auditorium addition was added in 1959, and in 1999 expansion and remodeling added administrative offices.

The school was named for Theodore Roosevelt. It was listed on the U.S. National Register of Historic Places in 1997.
