= Midwest Oil Company Hotel =

- U.S. National Register of Historic Places
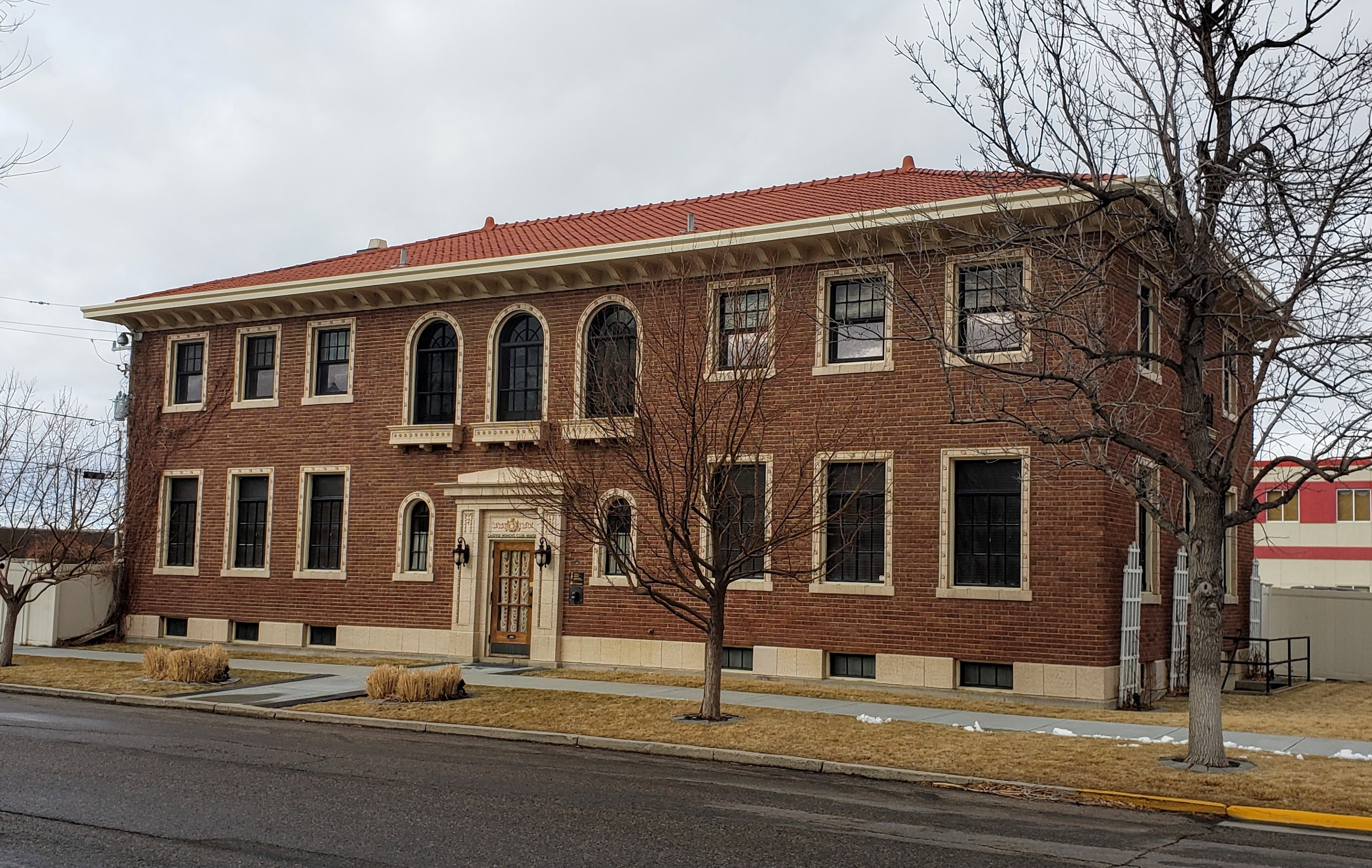
- Location: 136 E. 6th St., Casper, Wyoming
- Coordinates: 42°50′41″N 106°19′25″W
- Area: less than one acre
- Built: 1924
- Architect: Garbutt, Weidner and Sweeney
- NRHP reference No.: 83004302
- Added to NRHP: November 17, 1983

The Midwest Oil Company Hotel, at 136 East 6th Street in Casper, Wyoming, is an historic hotel building which was listed on the National Register of Historic Places in 1983. It has also served as the Casper Women's Club House. Originally built by the Midwest Oil Company to accommodate workers during the Casper oil boom, it was taken over by Standard Oil Company of Indiana when that company bought Midwest Oil. In the 1930s, in the waning days of oil production in Natrona County, a local women's organization bought the hotel for $8,000 and was renamed the Casper Women's Club House.

The Casper Women's Club House has been the home of several women's organizations during the 20th century. Notable clubs include the American Association of University Women, the Beta Sigma Phi Club, the Casper Fine Arts Club, the Casper Women's Club, and the Daughters of the American Revolution.

It was sold to a private individual in the 2000s.

== Building ==
The Midwest Oil Company Hotel was designed by Garbutt, Weidner and Sweeney. It was built in 1924 in the Renaissance Revival-style.

It is a two-story red brick building. It was listed on the National Register of Historic Places in 1983.
