= Casper Fire Department Station No. 1 =

- U.S. National Register of Historic Places
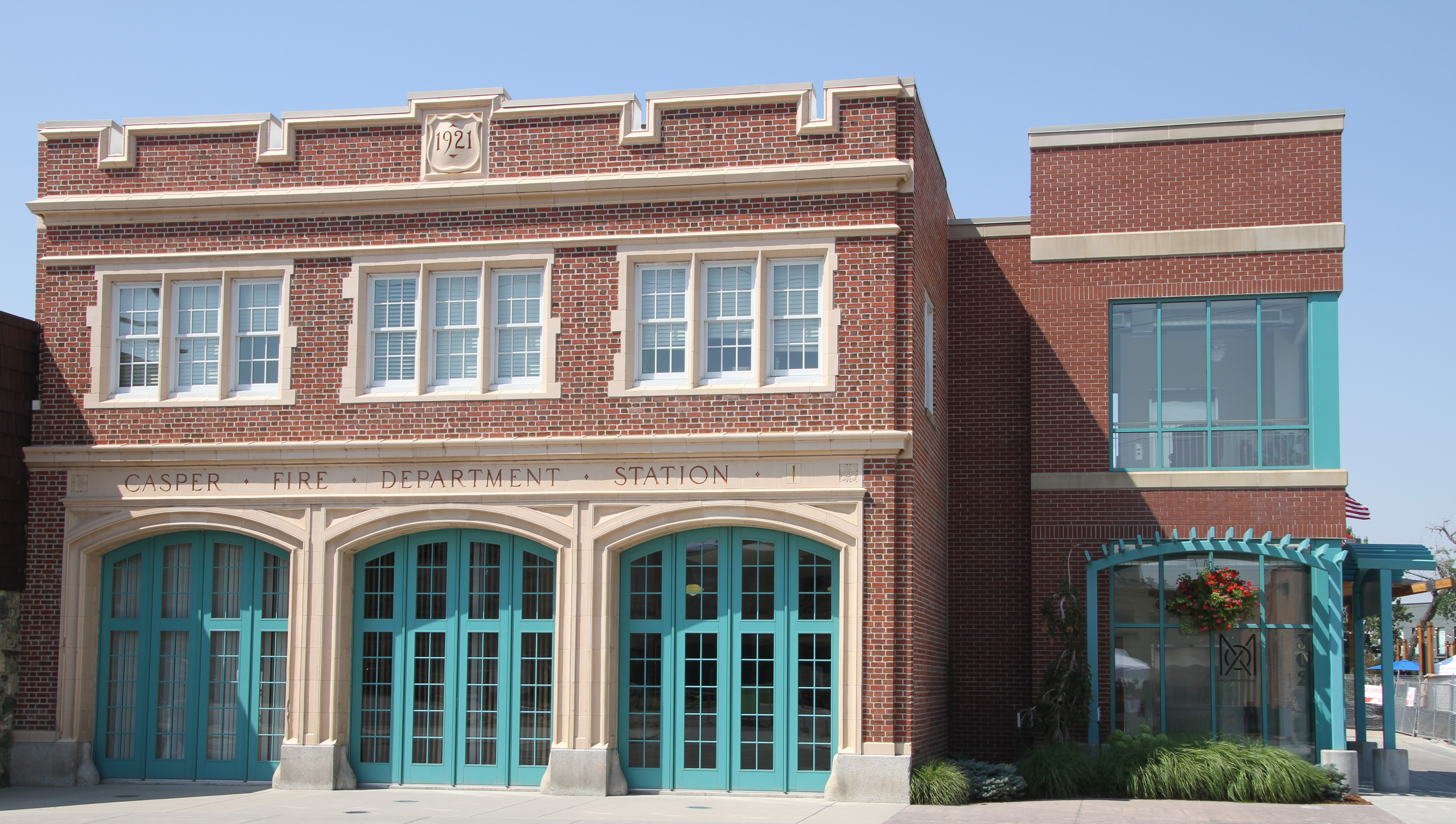

- Location within Wyoming Location within the United States
- Location: 302 South David Street, Casper, Wyoming
- Coordinates: 42°50′52″N 106°19′35″W
- Area: less than one acre
- Built: 1921
- Architect: Garbutt, Weidner and Sweeney
- Architectural style: Late Gothic Revival
- NRHP reference No.: 93001187
- Added to NRHP: November 4, 1993

The Casper Fire Department Station No. 1, also known as Casper Municipal Garage and Fire Station, was built in 1921. It was listed on the National Register of Historic Places in 1993.

It was designed by Casper architects Garbutt, Weidner and Sweeney in Late Gothic Revival style. It is a two-story 42 by 80 feet (13 m × 24 m) brick building with decorative terra cotta manufactured by the Denver Terra Cotta Company.
