= Church of St. Anthony (Casper, Wyoming) =

Historic church in Wyoming, United States

- Church of Saint Anthony
- U.S. National Register of Historic Places
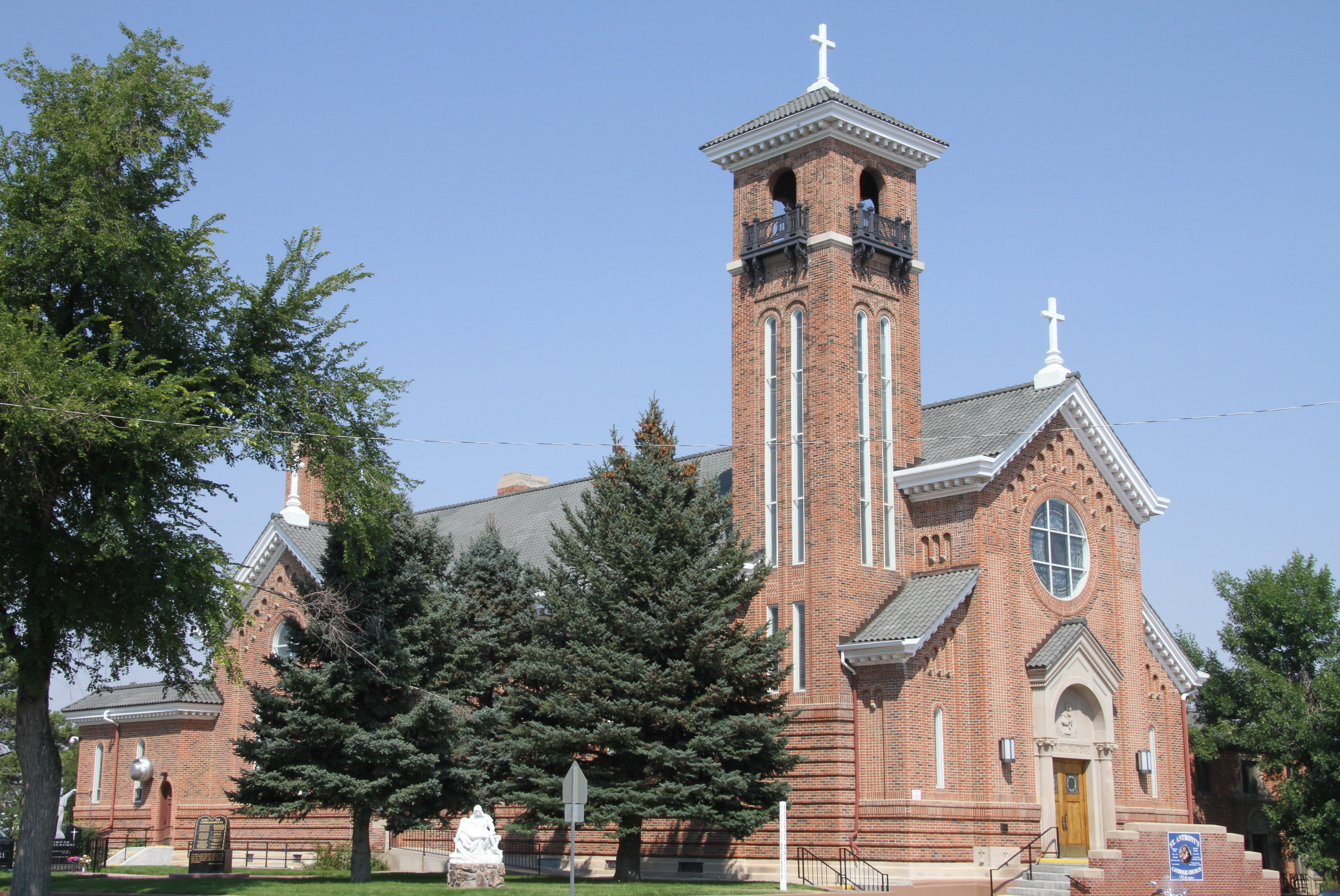

- Location within Wyoming
- Location: 604 S. Center St., Casper, Wyoming
- Coordinates: 42°50′37″N 106°19′29″W
- Area: less than one acre
- Built: 1919-20
- Built by: Donahoe Construction Co.
- Architect: Garbutt, Weidner, and Sweeney
- Architectural style: Romanesque Revival
- Website: https://stawy.org/
- MPS: Buildings Designed by Garbutt, Weidner, and Sweeney in Casper MPS
- NRHP reference No.: 96001631
- Added to NRHP: January 30, 1997

The Church of Saint Anthony in Casper, Wyoming, is a Roman Catholic church located at 604 S. Center Street. It is a Romanesque Revival building designed by architects Garbutt, Weidner, and Sweeney and built in 1919–20.

It replaced a predecessor wooden church, built following a successful fund-raising drive started in 1897 by several Irish immigrant women. Irish immigrants worked as shepherds in the area.

The 1920 church is brick and marble upon a concrete foundation, with a full basement and a tile roof. The brick is laid in stretcher bond. Its "distinctive square bell tower, tile roof, round arched windows and corbel tables closely resemble churches in Italy and represents the Romanesque Revival architectural style.".

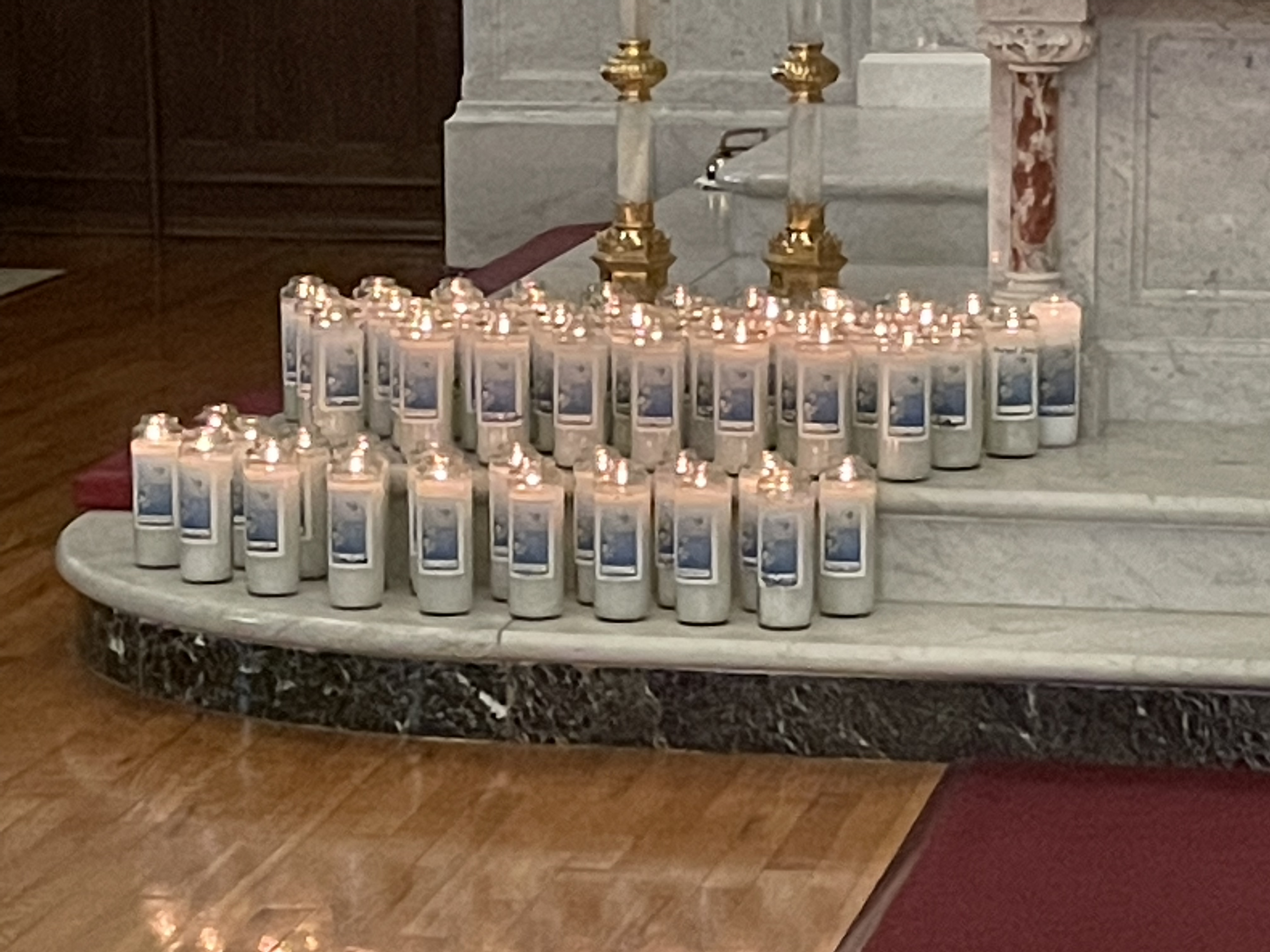
All Souls Day Candles at Saint Anthony’s Church

An adjacent rectory, built in 1949-50 is not included in the listing.

Saint Anthony’s Church engages in picketing for the pro life movement in Casper and sponsors True Care, a Crisis pregnancy center and ministry of the church.
