= Dux de Lux =

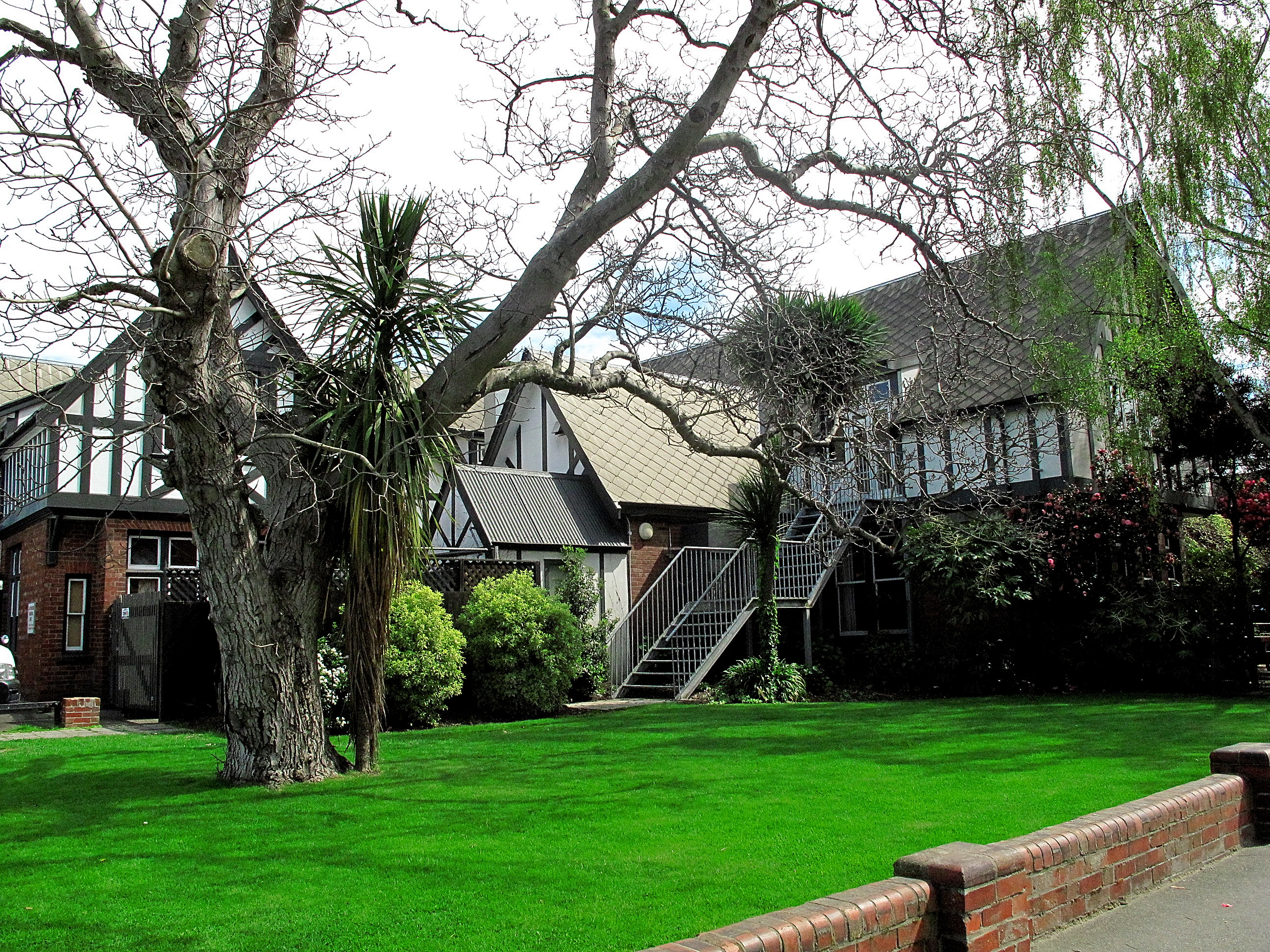
- Dux de Lux in 2010
- Interactive map of the Dux de Lux area
- Former names: Llanmaes

General information
- Type: Residential, converted to a restaurant and bar
- Architectural style: English Domestic Revival style
- Location: corner Hereford and Montreal Streets, Christchurch Central City, 41 Hereford Street, Christchurch, New Zealand
- Coordinates: 43.5318°S 172.6302°E
- Current tenants: nil (closed due to earthquake damage)
- Completed: 1883
- Renovated: 1928/29
- Client: John Lewis
- Owner: Art Centre Trust
- Landlord: Art Centre Trust Board

Technical details
- Floor count: two

Design and construction
- Architect: Francis Petre

Renovating team
- Architects: Collins and Harman

Website
- official website

Heritage New Zealand – Category 2
- Official name: Arts Centre of Christchurch Old Student Union Building
- Designated: 26 November 1981
- Reference no.: 4907

References
- "Dux de Lux". New Zealand Heritage List/Rārangi Kōrero. Heritage New Zealand.

The Dux de Lux (Latin: Masters of the Finest), originally called Llanmaes, was a popular beer garden and restaurant in Christchurch, New Zealand, that was part of the Arts Centre.

The building, initially a private home, became the home of the student union of the University of Canterbury at this central city site before the tertiary institution moved to the suburb of Ilam. It is listed as a Category II heritage building (register number 4907) by Heritage New Zealand. The building was closed following the February 2011 Christchurch earthquake, with the restaurant and bar moving to various suburban premises.

== Geography ==
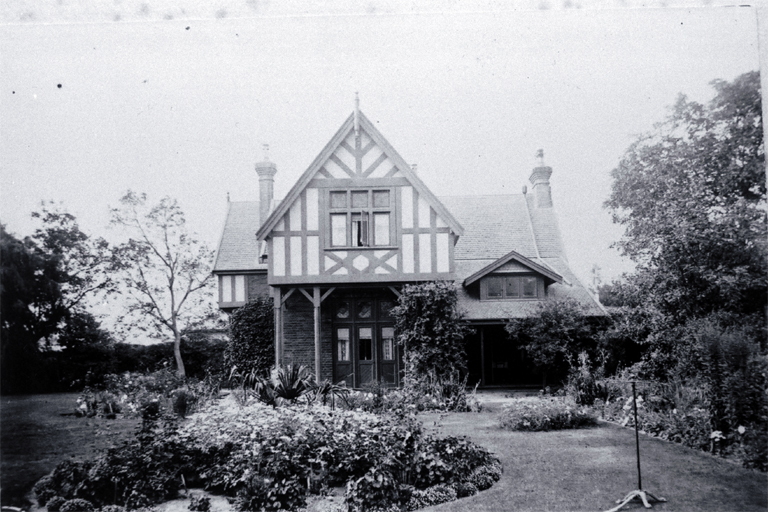
Llanmaes, c. 1920

The Dux de Lux is located in a stand-alone building, on the corner of Hereford and Montreal Streets in the central city. It is these days part of the Arts Centre that occupies that whole block and is thus located in the cultural precinct.

== History ==
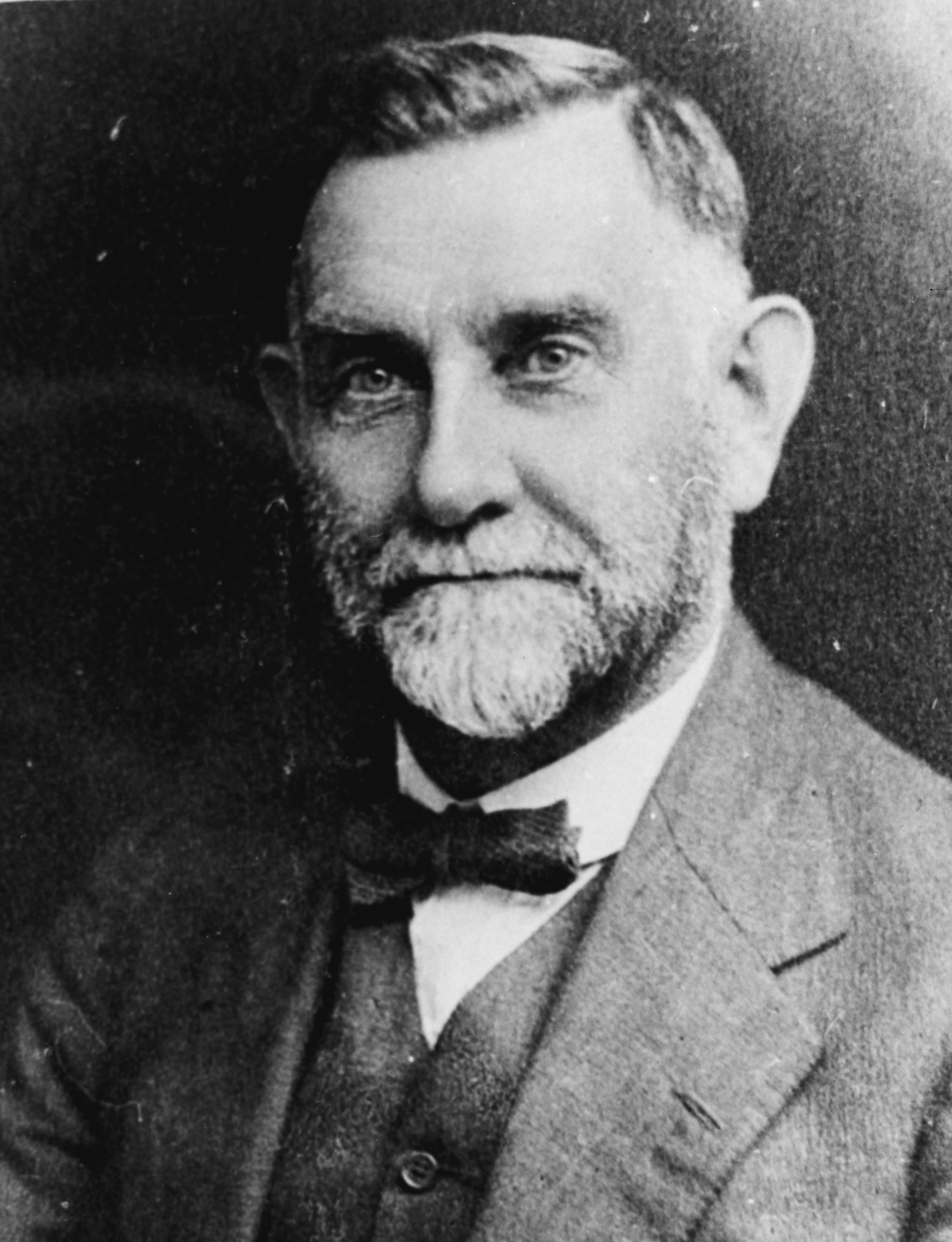
Charles Chilton in c. 1895

The merchant John Lewis commissioned the building with Francis Petre as his private residence, and it was constructed in 1883, in a Tudor Revival style similar to Pinner House in Dunedin, another Petre design. Lewis gave it the Welsh name of Llanmaes, which means 'the church in the meadow'. The house changed ownership to Dr Colin Graham Campbell in 1899, who onsold it to Dr Charles Chilton in 1904. Chilton was a zoologist, the first rector to be appointed in Australasia, and the first person to be awarded a D.Sc. degree in New Zealand. He lived in the building until 1911 and sold it to Eliza Vincent. When Vincent died, the building was purchased by the university in 1926. For the next three years, the building was used as the rector's residence.

Canterbury College, from which the University of Canterbury developed, was first established in 1872. Either in 1875–1876 on in 1877, the Benjamin Mountfort-designed clock tower was the first building erected by the college on the block bounded by Worcester, Rolleston, Hereford and Montreal Streets. Llanmaes was the last building on the block purchased by the college.

The Canterbury Students' Association was formed in 1894. An immediate issue was to find a suitable place for students to meet, but it was not until 1921 that a tearoom was set aside for this purpose. Regarded as a temporary solution, the students pursued the idea to have their own building. V. R. J. Hearn won a design competition with his entry in Gothic Revival style, in keeping with the college's older buildings. The estimated cost of £30,000 proved to put this aim out of reach. The board of the university suggested that Llanmaes, which had just been purchased, could be used by the students. Although the Students' Association rejected the idea, the architects Collins and Harman were tasked with developing plans for extending the building. The architects were sympathetic to the original design and continued with the original style of English Domestic Revival style architecture. An addition, low brick walls around the street frontage, was made in 1928–1929 by Collins and Harman. From 1929, the building served as the Student Union. While a 1954 fire damaged much of the interior, construction in 1955–1956 added a dining room and three meeting rooms. After the student union had moved out, the building was used as a childcare centre. It was then converted into a bar, music venue, and restaurant. The Dux de Lux, which is Latin for Masters of the Finest, opened in late 1978.

New Zealand band Salmonella Dub will release the single Same Home Town in 2013 in honour of their 20th birthday. The single is dedicated to the Dux de Lux as their early Christchurch venue.

=== 2011 earthquake ===
As a result of the 22 February 2011 Christchurch earthquake, the Dux de Lux closed due to structural damage. The wider Arts Centre was forced to close all its buildings due to severe damage, meaning the famous vegetarian and seafood establishment, alongside other tenants, was evicted. In late 2011 the music venue Dux Live! opened in Addington. Then 2012 saw the opening of Dux Dine in the neighbouring suburb Riccarton. The Dux Brewing Company continues to manufacture and supply craft beer, such as the Ginger Tom.

== Architecture ==
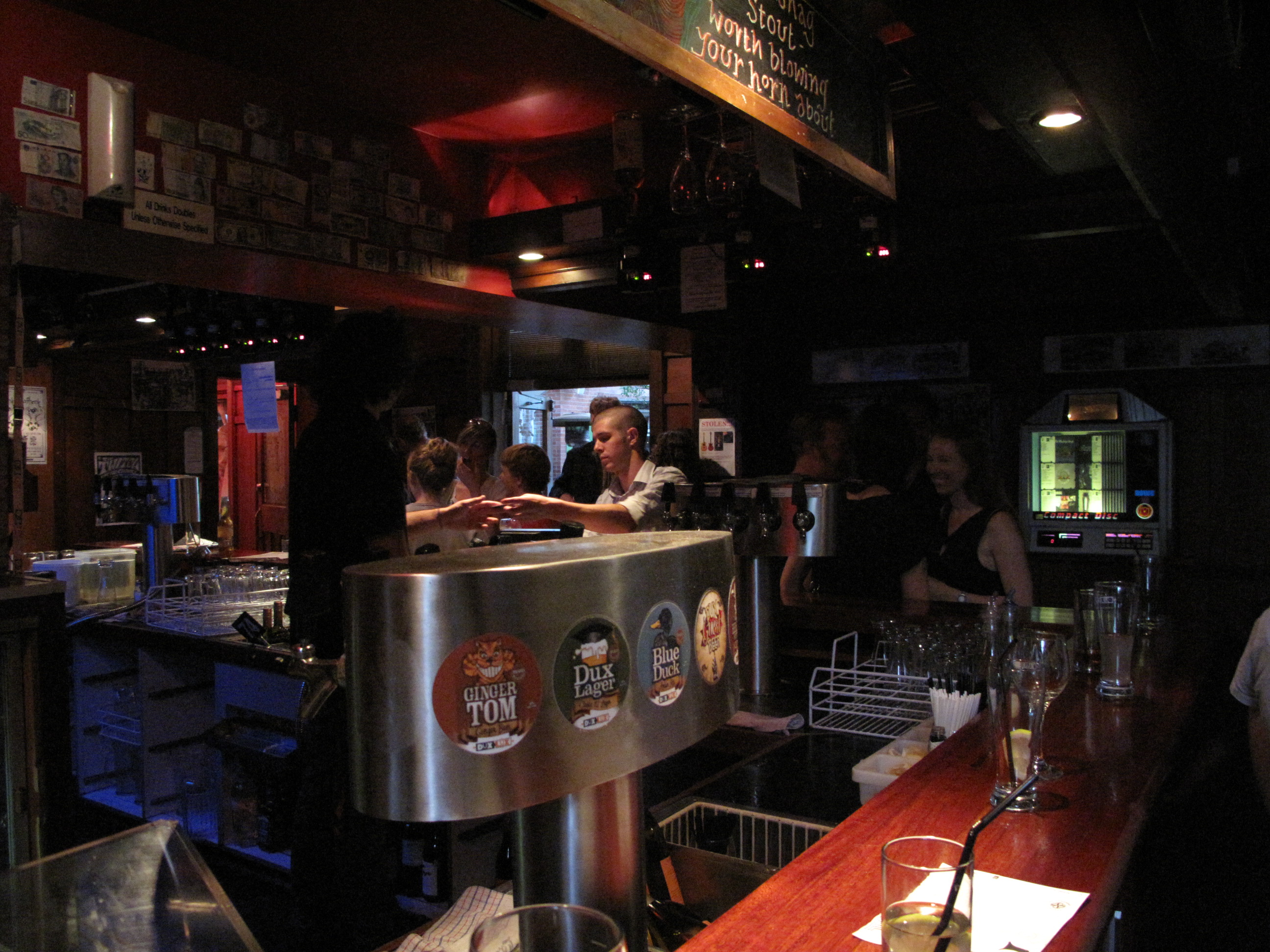
Dux de Lux bar

The building's English Cottage style is Tudor influenced. There are several interconnected wings. At the west end, there is a 2-storey Brew Bar with offices above. At the north end, there is a single-storey Tavern Bar. In the northeast corner, there is a 2-storey plus part single storey wing, which includes a restaurant and Function Room. In the southeast corner, a 2-storey section contains stairs, amenities, and an office. Its construction includes slate tile roof cladding, timber rafters, and a timber framed flat roof. Both the first floor and ground floor are timber framed. The exterior load bearing walls, as well as some of the interior walls, are of double brick. The interior finishing is of lath and plaster. A brick chimney is situated in the west wall, while the north wall has a bay window. Other notable features are the stained glass windows, three large panels and three small panels, and brick arches at the north and south entries. In 1929, it had rimu panelling and wallpaper in 'quiet shades'.

== Heritage registration ==
The Dux de Lux was registered by the New Zealand Historic Places Trust as a Category II heritage building on 26 November 1981 with registration number 4907. It is an example of Francis Petre's domestic work, who is better known for the design of basilicas, including the Cathedral of the Blessed Sacrament in Christchurch.

The building is significant, as it housed the student union of the University of Canterbury for four decades; it is thus considered part of the social fabric of the university by many alumni. Many consider the building to be the heart of the former university.

== See also ==
- List of restaurants in New Zealand
