= Tribune Building (Casper, Wyoming) =

- U.S. National Register of Historic Places
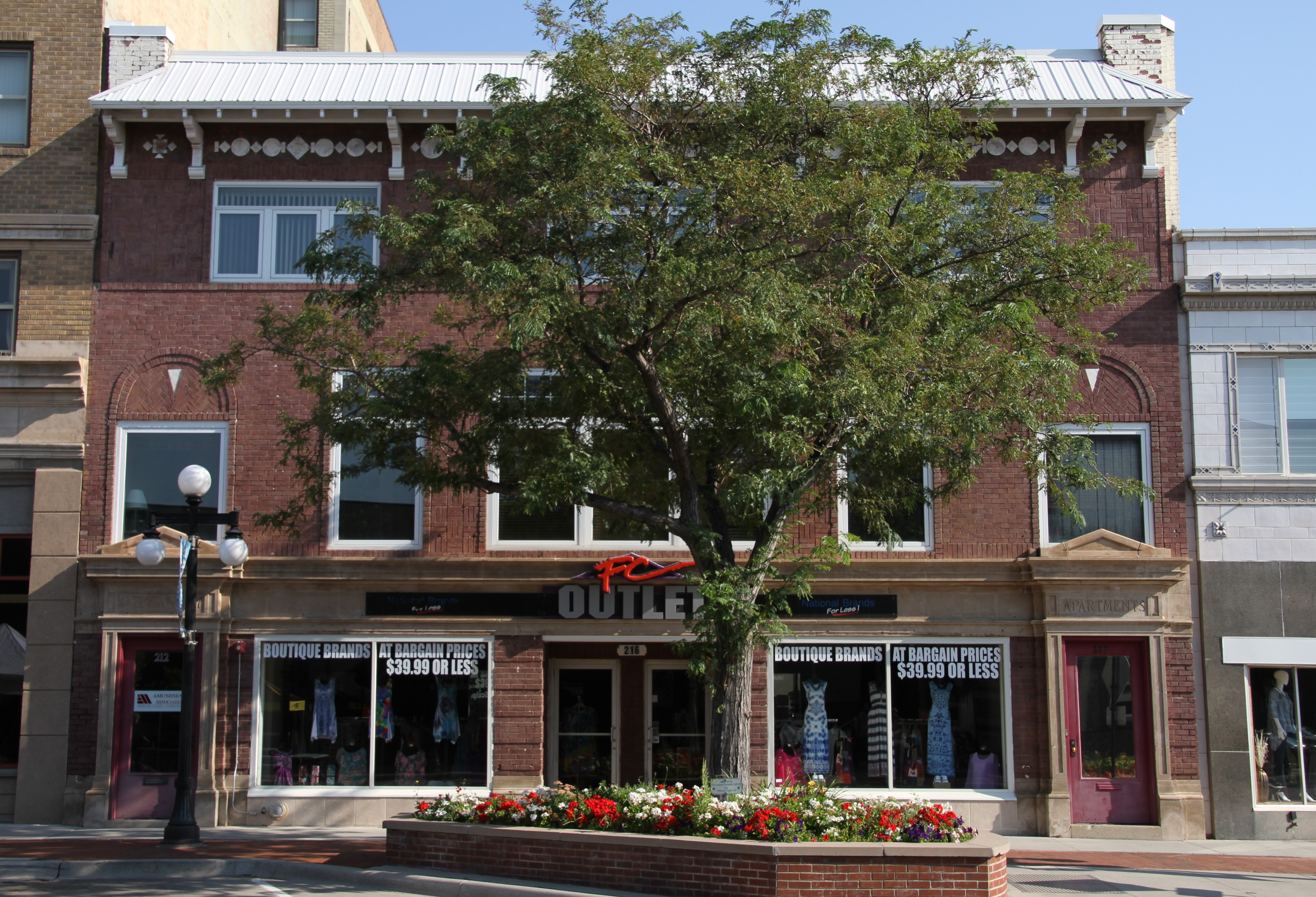

- Location within Wyoming Location within the United States
- Location: 216 E. 2nd St., Casper, Wyoming
- Coordinates: 42°50′56″N 106°19′22″W
- Area: less than one acre
- Built: 1920
- Architect: Garbutt, Weidner and Sweeney
- Architectural style: Late 19th And 20th Century Revivals
- NRHP reference No.: 94000041
- Added to NRHP: February 18, 1994

The Tribune Building in Casper, Wyoming, was built in 1920 to house the Casper Tribune newspaper. It was listed on the National Register of Historic Places in 1994.

It is a three-story brick building designed by architects Garbutt, Weidner and Sweeney.
