= Mount Townsend =

Mount Townsend may refer to

- Mount Townsend (Alberta) in the Canadian Rockies
- Mount Townsend (Blue Mountains) in New South Wales, Australia
- Mount Townsend (New Zealand)
- Mount Townsend (Nunavut) in Nunavut, Canada
- Mount Townsend (Papua New Guinea)
- Mount Townsend (Snowy Mountains) in New South Wales, Australia
- Mount Townsend (Washington) in the Olympic Mountains, Washington, USA
