= Townsend (CDP), Wisconsin =

Census-designated place in Wisconsin, United States

Townsend, Wisconsin
- Unincorporated community
- Location within Wisconsin
- Coordinates: 45°19′41″N 88°35′22″W
- Country: United States
- State: Wisconsin
- County: Oconto

Area
  - Total: 0.404 sq mi (1.05 km^{2})
  - Land: 0.404 sq mi (1.05 km^{2})
  - Water: 0 sq mi (0 km^{2})
- Elevation: 1,355 ft (413 m)

Population (2020)
  - Total: 179
  - Density: 443/sq mi (171/km^{2})
- Time zone: UTC-6 (Central (CST))
  - Summer (DST): UTC-5 (CDT)
- ZIP code: 54175
- Area codes: 715 & 534
- GNIS feature ID: 1580636

Townsend is an unincorporated census-designated place located in the town of Townsend, Oconto County, Wisconsin, United States. Townsend is located on Wisconsin Highway 32, 22.5 miles (36.2 km) southeast of Crandon. Townsend has a post office with ZIP code 54175. As of the 2020 census, its population was 179, up from 146 at the 2010 census.
