= Townsend Observatory =

Hotel in Christchurch, New Zealand

Coordinates: 43.53183°S 172.62862°E

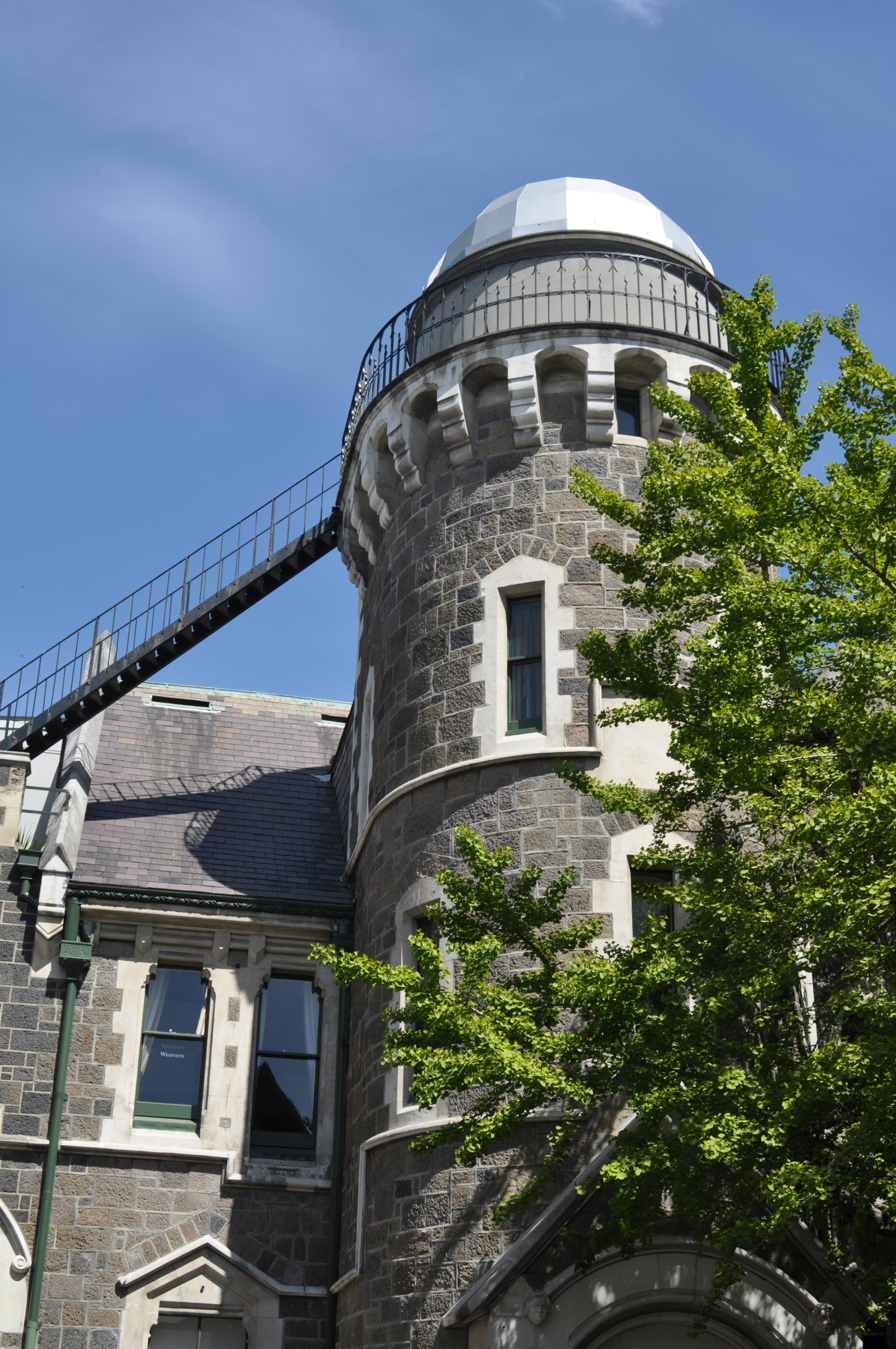
Townsend Observatory at the Christchurch Arts Centre

Townsend Observatory, owned and administered by the University of Canterbury, is part of the Arts Centre of Christchurch, New Zealand and was open on clear Friday evenings. The building collapsed in the February 2011 Christchurch earthquake.

== History ==
James Townsend was one of the Canterbury Pilgrims, having arrived on the Cressy in December 1850. In his retirement, he lived on Park Terrace, just north of the site of the Canterbury College. In 1891, he gifted his equatorial telescope to the college, as he wished to make it available to the community. Townsend's telescope was built by Thomas Cooke in 1864.

Triggered by Townsend's gift, the Astronomical Society of Christchurch made its funds of NZ£420 available to the college on the understanding that an observatory would be built. New Zealand was in a recession, and the college was reluctant to start a new building. Townsend died in November 1894 and did not see the observatory being started. In 1895, the decision was made to build a new biology building including a tower for the observatory. It was Benjamin Mountfort's last major design for the college and cost twice his estimate, but nonetheless was not lavish. In an editorial, the local newspaper, The Press, called it "a small but picturesque looking structure".

There were maintenance problems with the roof and the original canvas and wooden dome structure had to be replaced in 1914. In the early 1940s, the same problems occurred and the telescope suffered damage, but it was not until 1950 that the roof was replaced.

The observatory was open to the public from 8pm to 10.30pm, during the non-daylight saving months from March to October.

The observatory was destroyed when the part of the Arts Centre housing collapsed as a result of the February 2011 Christchurch earthquake. The historic Cooke 6" refractor telescope and its dome initially survived the collapse, but was subsequently run over by a bulldozer when rubble was being shifted. The university restored the telescope by the beginning of 2023. The restored tower opened as a hotel in 2022. Open nights with the telescope run by the University of Canterbury restarted after 12 years, on the 5th of May 2023.
