= Townsend, Wisconsin =

- Town
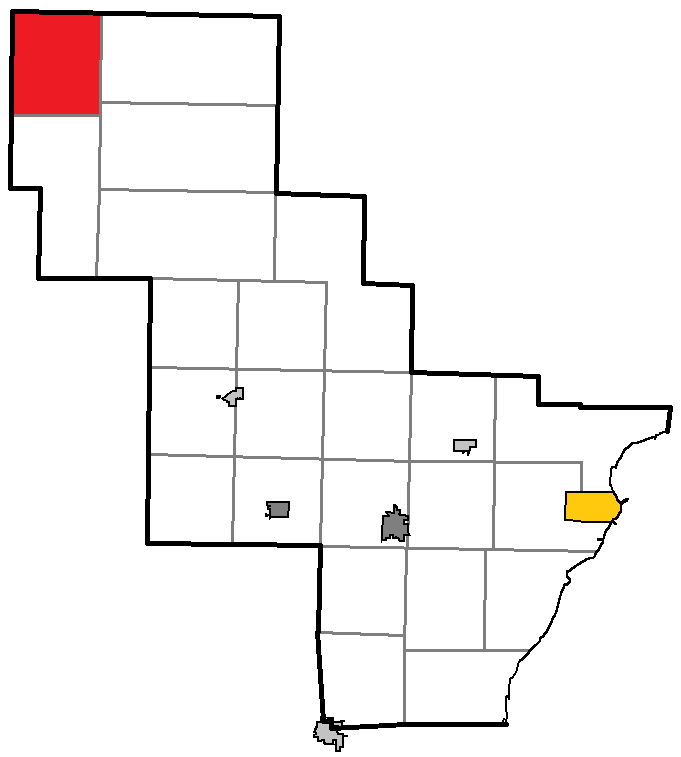
- Location of Townsend, within Oconto County
- Coordinates: 45°19′5″N 88°36′57″W
- Country: United States
- State: Wisconsin
- County: Oconto

Area
  - Total: 42.5 sq mi (110.0 km^{2})
  - Land: 39.0 sq mi (101.0 km^{2})
  - Water: 3.5 sq mi (9.0 km^{2})
- Elevation: 1,388 ft (423 m)

Population (2020)
  - Total: 1,044
  - Density: 26.77/sq mi (10.34/km^{2})
- Time zone: UTC-6 (Central (CST))
  - Summer (DST): UTC-5 (CDT)
- Area codes: 715 & 534
- FIPS code: 55-80325
- GNIS feature ID: 1584287
- Website: Official website

Townsend is a town in Oconto County, Wisconsin, United States. The population was 1,044 at the 2020 census. The census-designated place of Townsend is located in the town. Townsend was originally established in 1864, and was named Johnson Siding. The community and town later became known as Wheeler, consisting of the modern towns of Lakewood and Townsend. In 1916, the Town of Townsend was established. The post office was established in 1903.

== Geography ==
According to the United States Census Bureau, the town has a total area of 42.5 square miles (109.9 km^{2}), of which 39.0 square miles (101.0 km^{2}) is land and 3.5 square miles (9.0 km^{2}) (8.15%) is water.

== Demographics ==
As of the census of 2000, there were 963 people, 436 households, and 313 families residing in the town. The population density was 24.7 people per square mile (9.5/km^{2}). There were 1,450 housing units at an average density of 37.2 per square mile (14.4/km^{2}). The racial makeup of the town was 97.51% White, 0.10% African American, 0.62% Native American, 0.10% Pacific Islander, 0.31% from other races, and 1.35% from two or more races. Hispanic or Latino of any race were 0.73% of the population.

There were 436 households, out of which 17.2% had children under the age of 18 living with them, 63.5% were married couples living together, 5.0% had a female householder with no husband present, and 28.0% were non-families. 24.1% of all households were made up of individuals, and 11.9% had someone living alone who was 65 years of age or older. The average household size was 2.21 and the average family size was 2.55.

In the town, the population was spread out, with 16.9% under the age of 18, 4.0% from 18 to 24, 17.9% from 25 to 44, 34.8% from 45 to 64, and 26.4% who were 65 years of age or older. The median age was 53 years. For every 100 females, there were 104.0 males. For every 100 females age 18 and over, there were 100.0 males.

The median income for a household in the town was $28,456, and the median income for a family was $36,875. Males had a median income of $32,000 versus $19,250 for females. The per capita income for the town was $16,680. About 3.9% of families and 6.8% of the population were below the poverty line, including 11.2% of those under age 18 and 2.0% of those age 65 or over.

== Notable people ==
- Russ Bauers, baseball player
