= Townsend Building =

Townsend Building may be:

- Townsend Building (Lake Butler, Florida) (aka "the Old Drugstore"), a historic site in the United States
- Townsend Building (Oxford), part of the Oxford University Department of Physics in the England
- Townsend Building (Sycamore, Illinois), a historic building in the United States
