= Townsend Hotel (Birmingham, Michigan) =

US hotel

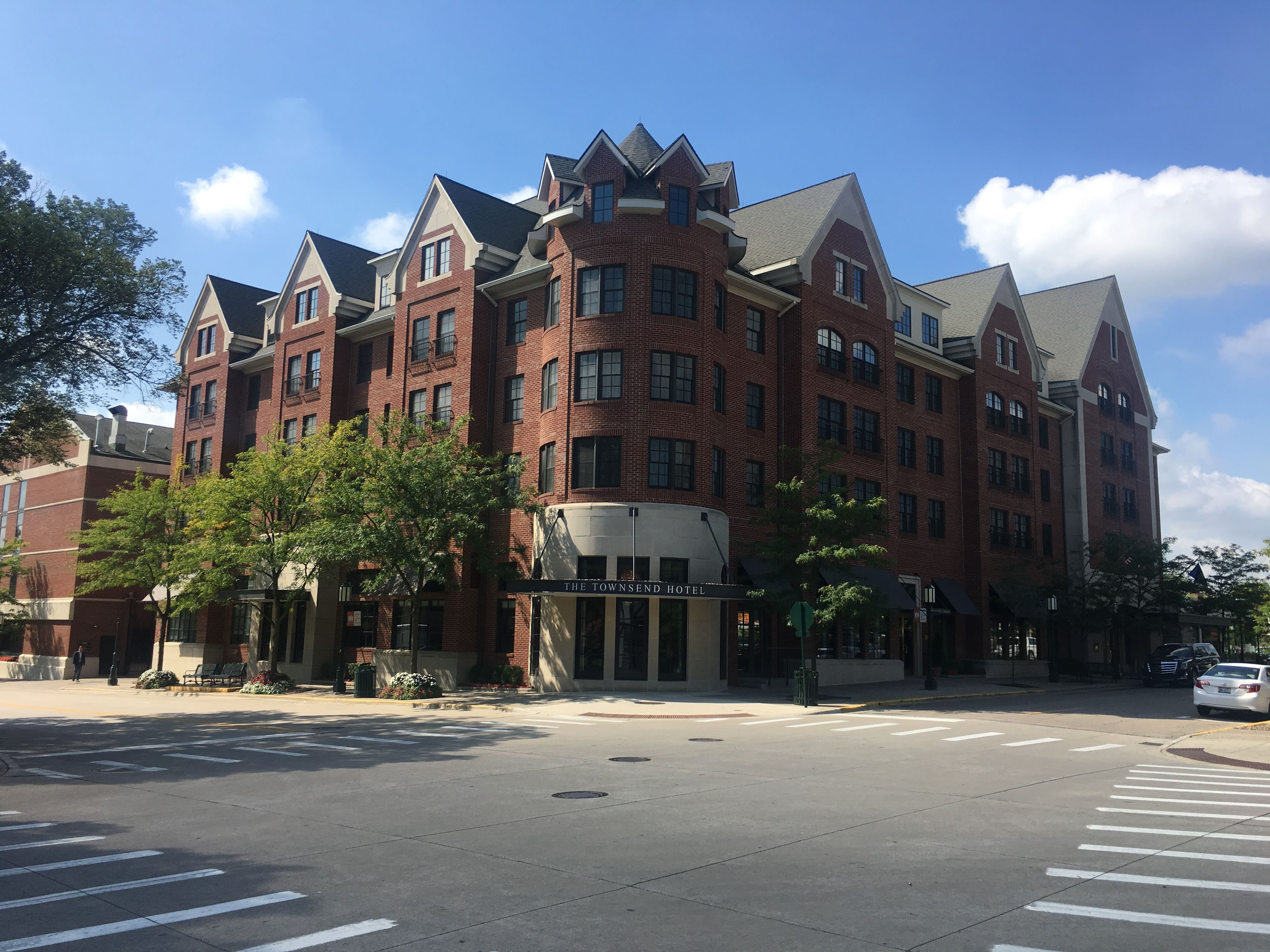
- Interactive map of the Townsend Hotel area

General information
- Location: United States, 100 Townsend Street; Birmingham, Michigan
- Coordinates: 42.5446°N 83.2154°W

Design and construction
- Awards: Michelin key

Other information
- Parking: Valet parking available

Website
- Townsend Hotel

The Townsend Hotel is a luxury boutique hotel located in the Metro Detroit city of Birmingham, Michigan. The hotel contains the Rugby Grille restaurant. In addition, the hotel ballroom can accommodate conferences of up to 500 people. The hotel architecture is in the English manor house style.

== Reception ==
The hotel has received several awards, including the AAA Four Diamond Award, Travel and Leisure Magazine's World's Best Award, and Forbes Four Star Award.
