= Townsend Hotel (Casper, Wyoming) =

- U.S. National Register of Historic Places
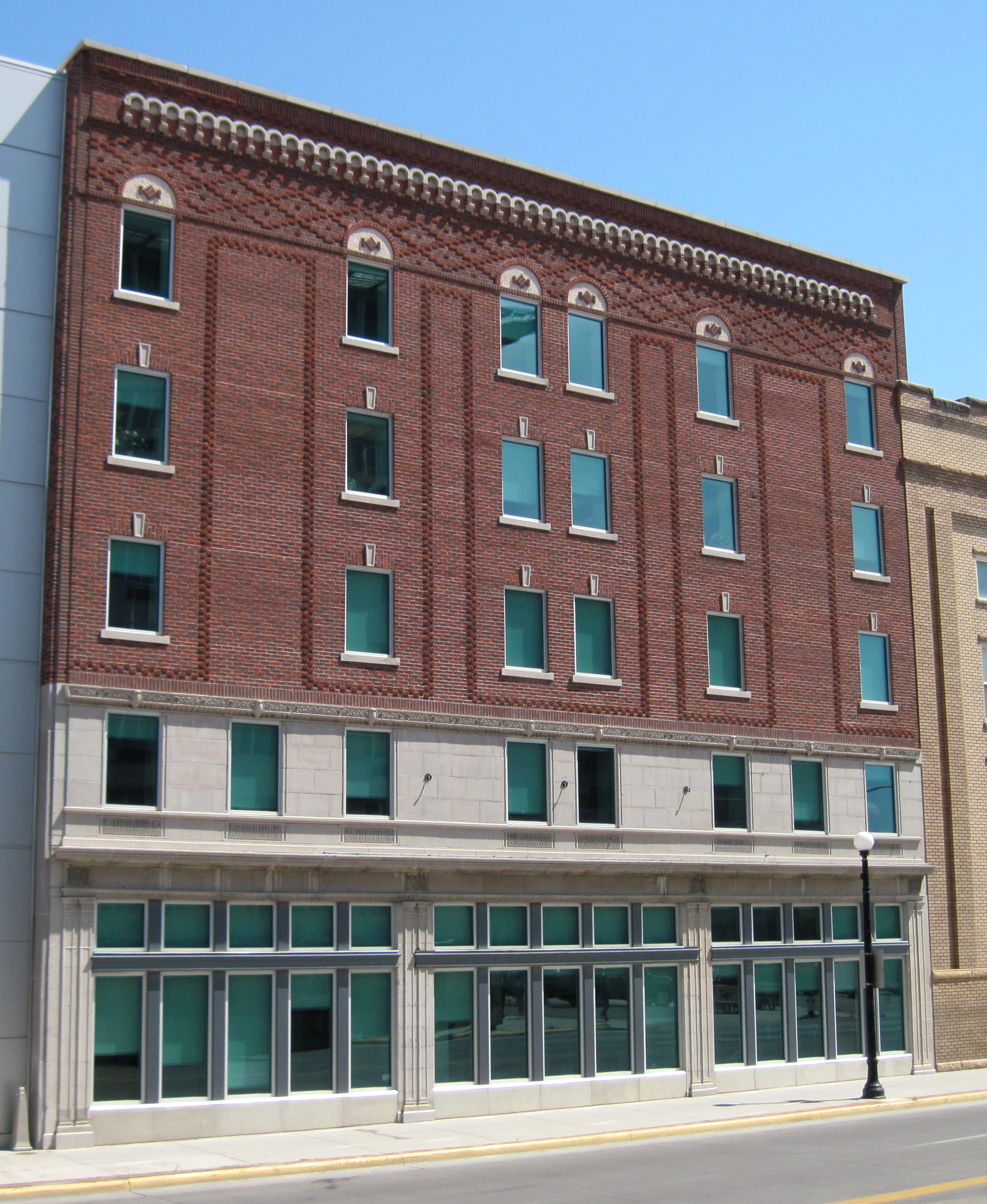
- Front facade, 2014

- Location within Wyoming Location within the United States
- Location: 115 N. Center St., Casper, Wyoming
- Coordinates: 42°51′1″N 106°19′29″W
- Area: less than one acre
- Built: 1923, expanded in 2008-2009
- Architect: Garbutt, Weidner & Sweeney
- NRHP reference No.: 83004303
- Added to NRHP: November 25, 1983

The Townsend Hotel, also known as the Hotel Townsend, is a historic hotel in Casper, Wyoming. It was renovated and expanded for government use in 2008-2009 and is now known as the Townsend Justice Center.

== Description ==
The Townsend Hotel is a five-story brick edifice in the heart of downtown Casper, Wyoming. Although the first story has a square floorplan, the remaining floors have E-shaped layouts, originally allowing all of the 135 guest rooms to have exterior walls and windows. The front façade is made of cast stone, mixed red and burgundy bricks, and some plaster. The first two stories are grey cast stone, and the remaining stories are brick. The sides and back of the hotel reveal the exposed concrete infrastructure with a red brick infill, which has since been stained to match the front. Although double-hung windows were originally placed around the building, they have been replaced with their single-paned counterparts.

== History ==
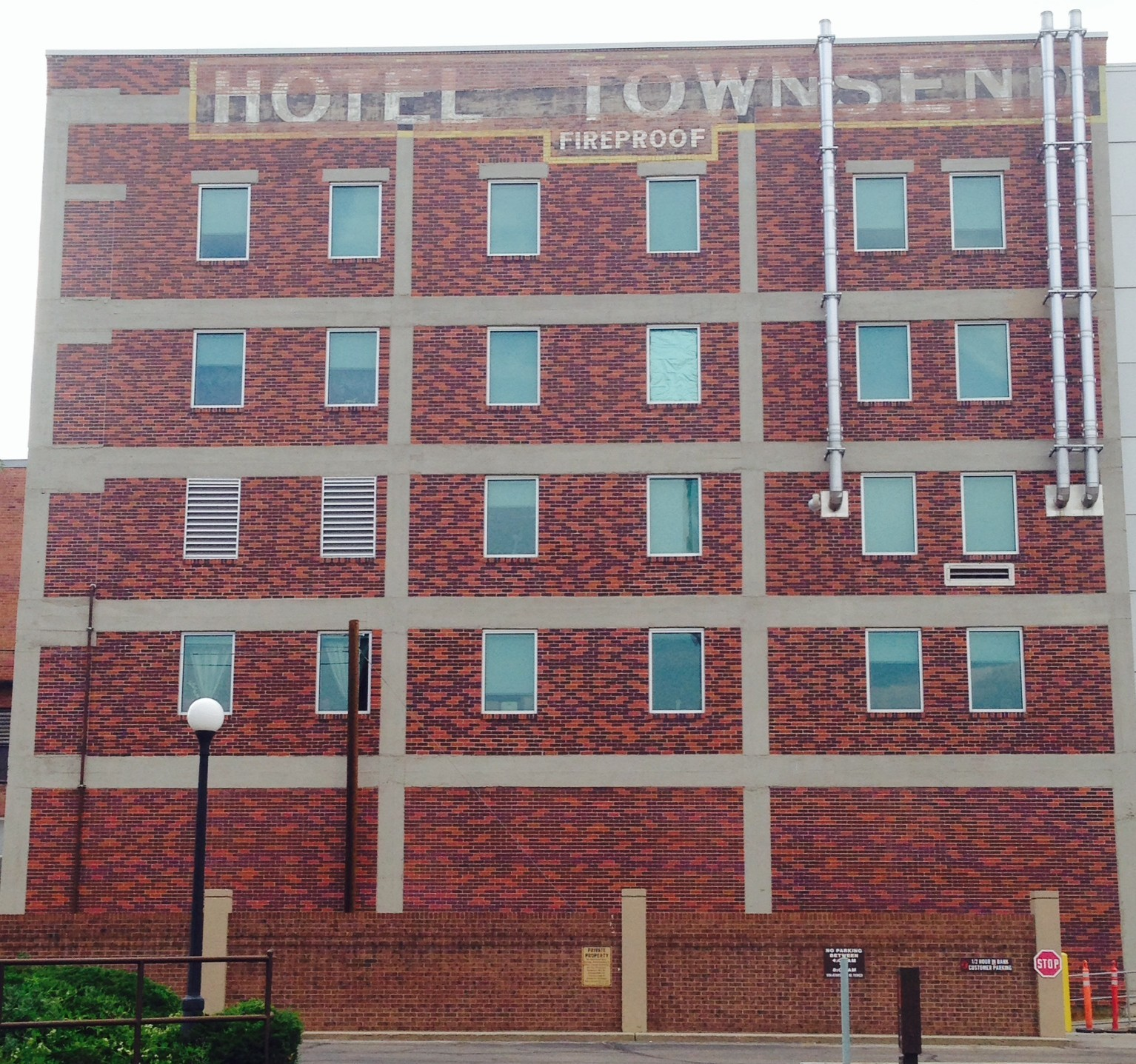
Rear of building, 2014

The hotel was built on the original location of the William Anthens pioneer homestead. The hotel structure was built in 1923 by Charles H. Townsend, a prominent local settler and businessman, and was designed by architects Garbutt, Weidner & Sweeney. It was one of three grand hotels built in the downtown area of Casper and the only one still standing, the others being the Henning Hotel and the Gladstone Hotel. The Townsend served as an important hub in the early social and political life of Casper. It hosted the Casper Rotary Club and other local organizations, and was used by the USO and commissioned officers during World War II. By the 1970s, however, the hotel had deteriorated to the point that it was closed in 1982. It was added to the National Register of Historic Places on November 25, 1983. The building was purchased by Realtor Betty Luker in the late 1980s, then sold to Jan Gray in 1998. In 2002 the hotel was bought by Townsend Properties LLC, which gutted the structure and removed all the asbestos in 2006.

On January 2, 2007, the building was purchased by the government of Natrona County. The building was renovated throughout 2008-2009 for use as a courthouse. A substantial addition was built on the building's north side, with a mixed brick scheme echoing that of the hotel's façade. In late 2009, the building was opened as the Townsend Justice Center. It now houses the district court offices and the clerk of county court, formerly located in the old courthouse across the street; along with the Natrona County Circuit Court, moved from the fifth floor of the Hall of Justice.

Remaining from the hotel's glory days, the lobby's original marble staircase is still intact, although it simply stops at the ceiling. Some of the marble from the hotel's interior was re-purposed, and a ghost sign advertising the hotel was kept on the back of the building.
