= Natrona =

Natrona may refer to:

== Places ==
- Wadi El Natrun (meaning "Natron Valley" and formerly known as Scetis or Scetes), a valley located in Beheira Governorate – including a town with the same name

=== United States ===
- Natrona, Kansas
- Natrona, Pennsylvania
- Natrona, Wyoming
- Natrona County, Wyoming
- Natrona Heights, Pennsylvania

== Other uses ==
- USS Natrona (APA-214), an attack transport ship of the U.S. Navy in service during World War II
- Natrona (mammal), a genus of fossil rodents

== See also ==
- Natron – The places above are named after these deposits.
- Natron (disambiguation)
