= Bucknum, Wyoming =

Bucknum
- Unincorporated/former community
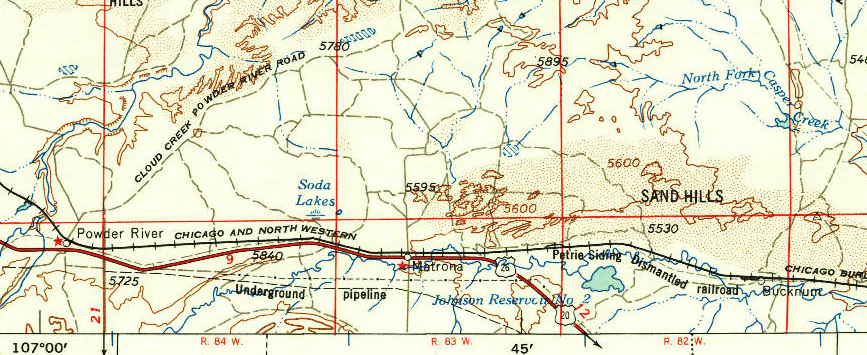
- Segment of 1958 USGS map showing, from left to right, Powder River, Natrona, and Bucknum.

- Location within the state of Wyoming Bucknum (the United States)
- Coordinates: 43°01′16″N 106°37′30″W
- Country: United States
- State: Wyoming
- County: Natrona
- Elevation: 5,440 ft (1,660 m)
- Time zone: UTC-7 (Mountain (MST))
  - Summer (DST): UTC-6 (MDT)
- ZIP codes: 82604 (Casper, WY)
- GNIS feature ID: 1597236

Bucknum is a place and former community in Natrona County, in the U.S. state of Wyoming. It is located about 24 miles west by road from Casper.

== History ==
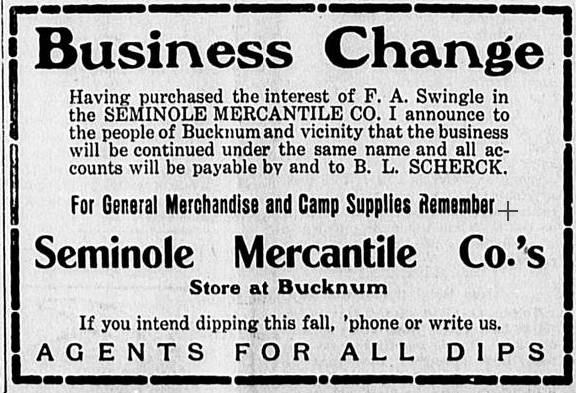
1909 advertisement for Seminole Mercantile Co. store in Bucknum

As the Chicago and North Western built a rail line through the area west from Casper to Lander, it opened a station called Seminole by late December 1905, about 22.4 miles west of Casper by rail. The "Seminole" name, however, started causing confusion with another Seminole located on the Union Pacific rail line in Wyoming. Therefore, the station was renamed Bucknum in December 1907 by the railroad for Charles K. Bucknum, a Wyoming legislator and former mayor of Capser who owned land near the site.

A post office was established in Bucknum in 1908, and remained in operation until it was discontinued in 1924.

Bucknum's reported population was 18 in 1917 and 25 in 1924. A school was reportedly established there by 1922.

As the Chicago and North Western abandoned its line, the communities in this area including Bucknum declined. Rail continues to serve the area, however. A Spanish company bought the bentonite mine in the area formerly owned by U.S. Bentonite (off Bucknum Road) in 2015. The Bucknum area now falls under the Casper zip code 82604.
