= Charles K. Bucknum =

American politician (1847–1915)

Charles Karner Bucknum
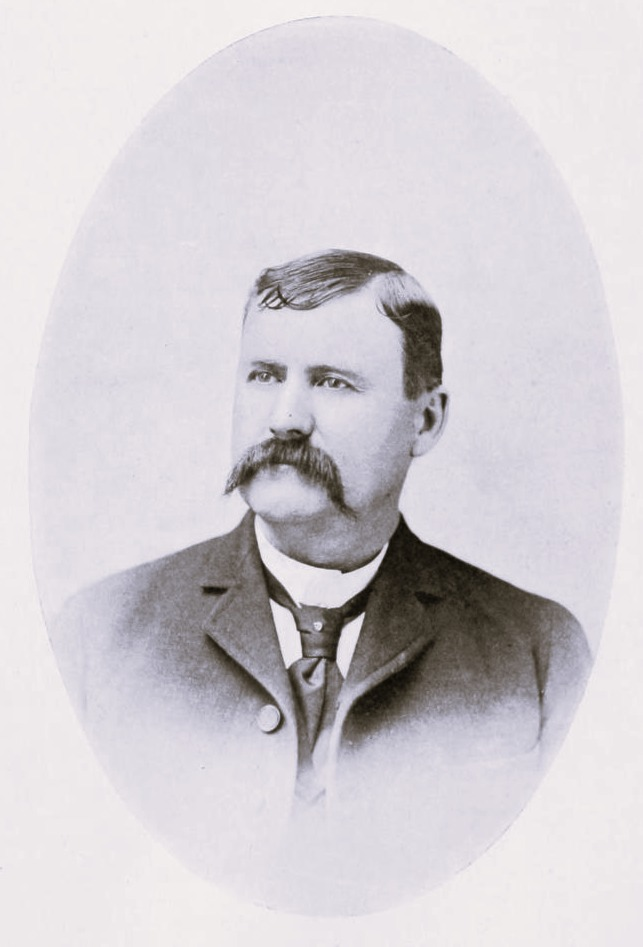
- Bucknum in 1903

Member of the Wyoming House of Representatives from Natrona County
- In office 1904–1908

Mayor of Casper, Wyoming
- In office 1892–1893; 1901–1902

Personal details
- Born: October 12, 1847 Peru, Indiana
- Died: November 21, 1915 (aged 68) Casper, Wyoming
- Resting place: Highland Cemetery; Casper, Wyoming
- Other political affiliations: Republican Party
- Spouse(s): Ioliti; Ida May Payne; Ethyl Ardell "Della" Williams
- Children: 2
- Profession: Politician; Fur Trader; Railroad track foreman
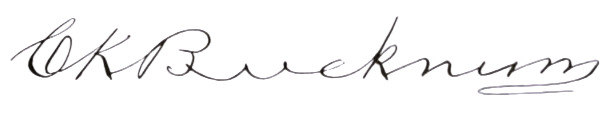
- Signature

Military service
- Allegiance: United States of America
- Years of service: 1863–1866
- Rank: Corporal
- Unit: Company F, Hatch's Minnesota Cavalry Battalion
- Battles/wars: Sioux Wars; Nez Perce War; Battle of Cow Island

Charles Karner Bucknum (October 12, 1847 – November 21, 1915), sometimes written as C. K. Bucknum, was an American Indian Wars veteran, settler, rancher, trapper, and politician who settled various areas of Wyoming Territory. Bucknum is noted as being one of the earliest settlers of Casper, Wyoming, and Musselshell, Montana. He served in the Wyoming House of Representatives from 1904 to 1908 and was the mayor of the city of Casper from 1892 to 1893 and again from 1901 to 1902. The city of Bucknum, Wyoming, just west of Casper, is named after him.

== Early life ==
Charles Karner Bucknum was born October 12, 1847, in Peru, Indiana, in Miami County. He was the son of Kelb Bucknum and Evaline Lumesdan, both of New York. He was also the great-grandson of Amasa and Anna Karner Bucknum. Bucknum's father was the owner of a pharmacy in Indiana until 1852 when his family traveled to McCartysville in California (now Saratoga, California). Bucknum's father died while in California in 1854. Bucknum and his family eventually moved to Minnesota Territory in 1856 and settled in Eureka Township in Dakota County, Minnesota.

On July 25, 1863, Bucknum enlisted into the ranks of Hatch's Minnesota Cavalry Battalion under the command of Edwin Aaron Clark Hatch. Bucknum, at only 17 years old, was assigned as a Corporal in Company F under the command of Edward Oakford. He served until mid-1866 when the battalion was mustered out of service.

== Early career ==
Following his discharge from the military Bucknum became a wagon master and traveled west through Dakota Territory, he briefly worked at Fort Stevenson where he was the boss of the Wilder, Merriman & Co. While in Dakota Territory Bucknum supplied wagon trains to a multitude of military posts including: Fort Stevenson, Fort Totten, Fort Buford, and Fort Claggett. Bucknum eventually made his way into Wyoming Territory and Montana Territory reaching Fort Benton by the summer of 1871.

== Wyoming and Montana ==
While at Fort Benton Bucknum befriended Major Guido Ilges (1835–1918), the commandant of Fort Benton. Ilges was originally from Prussia and had served with distinction at the Battle of Antietam commanding Company E of the 1st Battalion of the 14th Infantry Regiment. Ilges hired Bucknum as a military scout and guide due to Bucknum's proficiency in many Indigenous languages as well as in Plains Indian Sign Language. As a scout Bucknum's frontier experience from Minnesota during the aftermath of the Dakota War of 1862 and trading in Dakota Territory with the Dakota and Sioux was indispensable. While in Montana and Wyoming Bucknum also poached and trapped animals on the Yellowstone River and in Jackson Hole at the head of the Snake River.

Bucknum would eventually serve as a military scout under Major Ilges, General John Gibbon, General John R. Brooke, and Colonel Nelson A. Miles during the Nez Perce War. In 1875 Bucknum married a Gros Ventre woman by the name of Ioliti who later died in 1882, together they had 2 children. During the war Bucknum fought at the Battle of Cow Island as a civilian near the modern-day Cow Creek in Montana against the Nez Perce in September 1877.

=== Wagon trains and railways ===
Bucknum was forced to retire from the military as a scout in 1880 after breaking his foot while helping load a government safe at Fort Assiniboine in Alberta. During this time Bucknum focused solely on hauling freight for wagon trains from Fort Benton to Helena, Montana, and the basin at the Judith River. During this time Bucknum also did long-range hauling to Nebraska. In 1887 Bucknum joined the Chicago and North Western Railway and eventually built the first railroad through Casper.

=== Political office ===
Bucknum was elected for a variety of political positions both local and state-wide during his time in Wyoming. Starting out Bucknum first ran as the councilman for Casper. Bucknum later ran as the mayor of Casper from 1892 to 1893, he served as county commissioner of Natrona County, Wyoming, from 1895 to 1896, and was again elected as the mayor of Casper From 1901 to 1902. From 1904 to 1908 Bucknum served as a Republican state representative in the Wyoming Legislature, representing Natrona County. Bucknum was a close political affiliate of Wyoming senator Francis E. Warren (a fellow veteran), senator Clarence D. Clark, and Wyoming congressman Frank W. Mondell. During his time in the Wyoming Legislature he passed a bill commonly referred to as the "Bucknum Bill" which placed sheep on the same level as cattle if stolen by cattle raiders.

== Later life, death, and legacy ==
Bucknum eventually became one of the wealthiest ranchers and wool growers in Wyoming. Bucknum also built one of the largest livery barns in state history, the Star Livery Barn. In his later years Bucknum owned a large orange grove in Los Angeles. Bucknum died on November 21, 1915, at the age of 68. He is buried in the Highland Cemetery along with two of his wives in Casper. Bucknum had created the Highland Cemetery after the death of his first wife Ida May Payne. Saddened by her death, Bucknum purchased a quarter section of land east of the city of Casper to create a cemetery. Many of Casper's prominent early citizens are buried at Highland. Bucknum, Wyoming, is named after Bucknum. The city was named Bucknum on December 27, 1907, at the behest of Frank Walters, the local manager of the Chicago and North Western Railway.
