= Walter W. Kingham =

American politician

Member of the Wyoming House of Representatives
- In office 1953–1953

Personal details
- Born: October 4, 1908 Cheyenne, Wyoming, U.S.
- Died: October 11, 1997 (aged 89)
- Party: Republican
- Spouse: Helen Daily (m. 1933)
- Children: 3
- Education: University of Wyoming

Walter W. Kingham (October 4, 1908 – October 11, 1997) was an American politician. He served as a Republican member of the Wyoming House of Representatives.

== Life and career ==
Kingham was born in Cheyenne, Wyoming. He attended Cheyenne High School and the University of Wyoming.

In 1953, Kingham was elected to the Wyoming House of Representatives, representing Natrona County, Wyoming.

Kingham was managing director of the Wyoming Truck Association. He was also executive secretary of the Wyoming Association of Municipalities.

Kingham died in October 1997, at the age of 89.
