= Natron (disambiguation) =

Natron is a mineral containing sodium compounds.

Natron may also refer to:

- Natron (software), a video compositing application
- Lake Natron, a salt lake in Tanzania
- Natron Energy, a former US sodium-ion battery manufacturer

== See also ==
- Natrona (disambiguation)
