= Starship Troopers (board wargame) =

1976 science fiction board wargame

- Publishers: Avalon Hill
- Publication: 1976; 50 years ago
- Players: 1–2
- Playing time: circa 120 minutes

Starship Troopers is a board wargame by Avalon Hill based on the 1959 novel of the same name by Robert A. Heinlein. It was originally released in 1976 and designed by Randall C. Reed. Twenty years later, Avalon Hill redesigned and re-released a "movie" version (entitled Starship Troopers: Prepare for Battle!) in 1997 to coincide with the movie's release.

The game is a hexagon-based wargame for two players. The player who takes the side of Arachnids has a sheet of paper with a copy of the map-board, on which he plots out his bug-hive and tunnel system. The Mobile Infantry player sends in his soldiers and tries to dig them out. A third faction, the Skinnies, starts out playing on the bug side, but switches to the human side during later scenarios.

== Publication ==
The game was designed by Randall C. Reed who was the head of The Avalon Hill research and development staff in the late 1970s, and was one of the first new Avalon Hill employees after the Charles S. Roberts era. He later left Avalon Hill to work with wargames for the U.S. Marine Corps.

== Scenarios ==
The game is set up as a series of seven scenarios that recreate the battles described in the novel; the first scenario uses the basic rules, and then each succeeding scenario adds a new layer of rules, gradually increasing the complexity of the game as players advance through the scenarios:

- "Feint against the humanoids": A single squad of Rasczak's Roughnecks hits a Skinny colony.
- "Operation Bughouse": A complete platoon takes on an Arachnid hive.
- "Invasion of Skinny-5": A platoon's attack on a Skinny industrial center.
- "Revolt!": The Skinnies change sides and attack the Arachnids with the help of the Mobile Infantry.
- "Sheol" (two parts)
  - "Operation Corkscrew": The combat engineers enter the battle
  - "Retreat and Evacuation": A group of wounded M.I. are rescued.
- "Operation Royalty": A reinforced platoon takes on two Arachnids complexes to capture a Brain Bug.
- "Klendathu": Two platoons vs. two Arachnids complexes in a fight to free human prisoners of war.

== Reception ==
In Issue 11 of Perfidious Albion, Geoff Barnard and Charles Vasey exchanged thoughts about the game. Barnard commented, "This game is remarkably close to the book, and is a splendid compliment to Heinlein to the extent that his ideas can be portrayed in sufficient detail to make such a game as Starship Troopers ... The game contains considerable hidden movement for the alien player, and the manner in which the Bug underground hive complexes-cum-fortresses are represented is very well done indeed." Vasey replied, "Reminiscent of Vietnam War games: One player is all powerful, the other is well hidden ... Though tense, the constant element of surprise makes this a light-hearted and amusing game." Barnard concluded, "In all the scenarios, the two sides seem well balanced even though the weapons and abilities are quite different. A splendid tactical game." Vasey concluded, "You really feel like you are handling the Marines and when the Bugs swarm out with their decoy workers you get a sense of the whole book. Splendid."

In his 1977 book The Comprehensive Guide to Board Wargaming, Nicholas Palmer commented that this game "should please anyone who enjoyed the book; others can enjoy it but may be a bit bewildered at times!" He concluded, "The tactical problems are excellently done and true to the book."

In the August–September 1976 edition of The Space Gamer (Issue No. 7), Todd Roseman felt that the game "faithfully recreates the heroic battles of the Terran Mobile Infantry as described in the classic Robert Heinlein novel" and concluded that "for those people who read Starship Troopers and said to themselves, 'I know there's a great game in there somewhere', go out and get a copy of SST... on the bounce!" In the next issue of The Space Gamer, Sumner N. Clarren recommended Starship Troopers, saying "The game is truly tactical in scale and in flavor." and that "Starship Troopers is a fine tactical science fiction board game from Avalon Hill."

In 1977, in the inaugural edition of White Dwarf, Martin Easterbrook gave the game an overall rating of 9 out of 10, saying, "All in all this is probably the best SF game currently on the market because it has the well worked out background of Heinlein's novel and because it is an extrapolation of current military technology, allowing Avalon Hill to use their experience in game design"

In 1980, in the inaugural edition of Ares Magazine, Eric Goldberg gave Starship Troopers a rating of 5 out of 9, citing the limited replay value of the game. ""The play of the game will prove interesting for the first few times, but then the simulation value of the game will be exhausted - this cannot stand on its own as a game."

In the April 1980 edition of Dragon, Michael Crane liked the game components, which he said were up to Avalon Hill's usual high standards, although he didn't enjoy the colors used on the board game, which he called "enough to make the stomach churn." But he thought the rule book was well thought out, and concluded that "the game does provide a general 'feel' for the novel". Crane concluded by recommending the game, calling it "an excellent buy".

In the 1980 book The Complete Book of Wargames, game designer Jon Freeman commented that this game "provides a refreshingly different environment in which to maneuver a fairly standard array of units." Freeman noted "If the game has a fault, it may be that it's too conventional — it's PanzerBlitz in spacesuits." He gave this game an Overall Evaluation of "Very Good", concluding, "the action is fast and furious, and the game is exciting as any on the market."

== Reviews ==
- Moves #32, p4-6, 10
- Games & Puzzles #69
- InQuest Gamer #34

== See also ==
- Galac-Tac
- Starweb
