= Hell's Half Acre (Wyoming) =

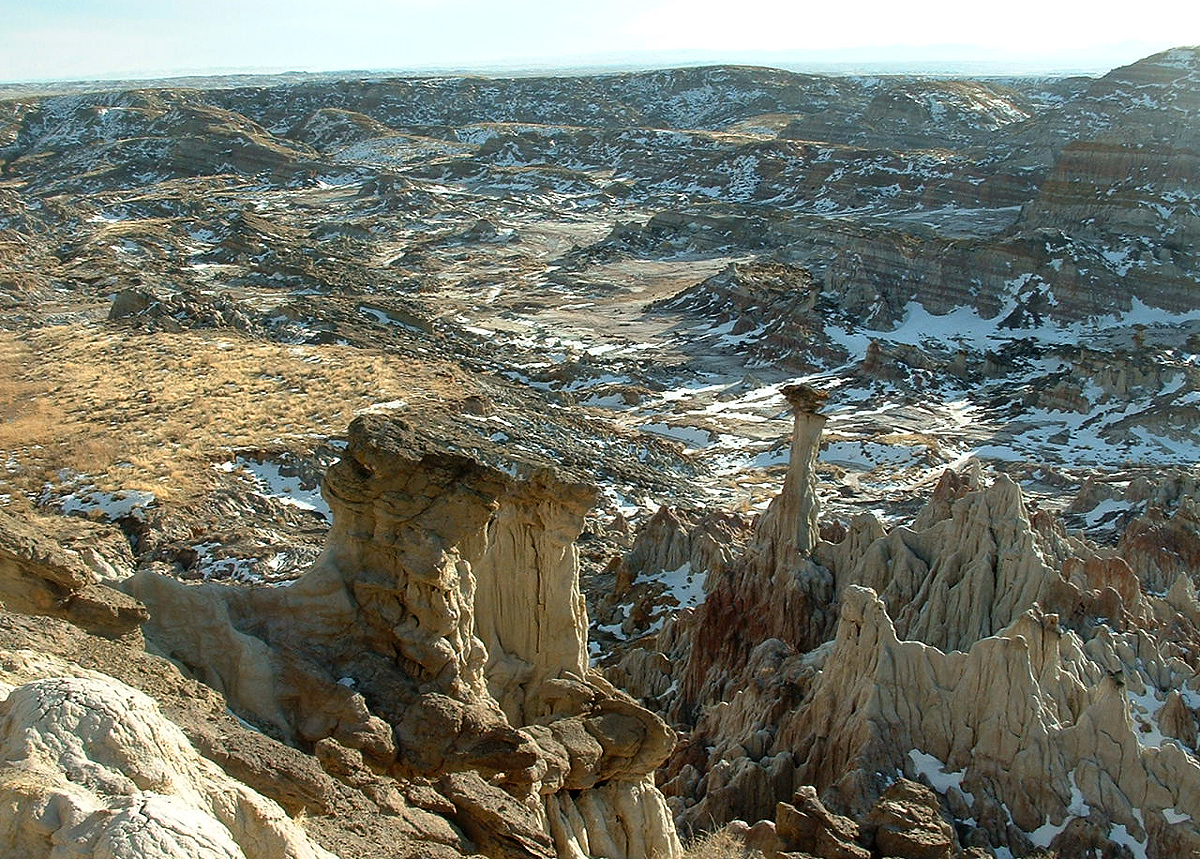
- Southwest view from Hell's Half Acre summit
- Interactive map of Hell's Half Acre
- 43°02′17″N 107°05′35″W
- Location: Natrona County, Wyoming

Site notes
- Area: 320 acres (1.3 km^{2})
- Governing body: Natrona County, Wyoming

Hell's Half Acre
- Unincorporated community
- Location within the state of Wyoming Hell's Half Acre (the United States)
- Country: United States
- State: Wyoming
- County: Natrona
- Elevation: 6,033 ft (1,839 m)
- Time zone: UTC-7 (Mountain (MST))
  - Summer (DST): UTC-6 (MST)

Hell's Half Acre is a large scarp located about 40 miles (64 km) west of Casper, Wyoming on US 20/26. Encompassing 320 acres (1.3 km^{2}), this geologic oddity is composed of deep ravines, caves, rock formations and hard-packed eroded earth. Hell's Half Acre was used as the location for the fictional planet of Klendathu in the movie Starship Troopers.

The location was known as "The Devil's Kitchen", "The Pits of Hades", and "The Baby Grand Canyon" until a cowhand appeared and thought he was at Hell's Half Acre, an area southwest of Casper full of alkali and bogs.

Native American tribes used the ravines to drive bison to their death during their hunts.

In 2005, the small restaurant and motel sitting atop the ravine were shut down by the property's leaseholders due to a lack of visitors and subsequently demolished. The area is fenced off and there is no public access to the cliff edge nor the valley itself, but there is an interpretive sign west of where the former restaurant stood. As of July 2021, the fencing was still in place, but two gates in the fence were open, allowing vehicular access to a large gravel lot (with potholes) and a closer view of the topography.

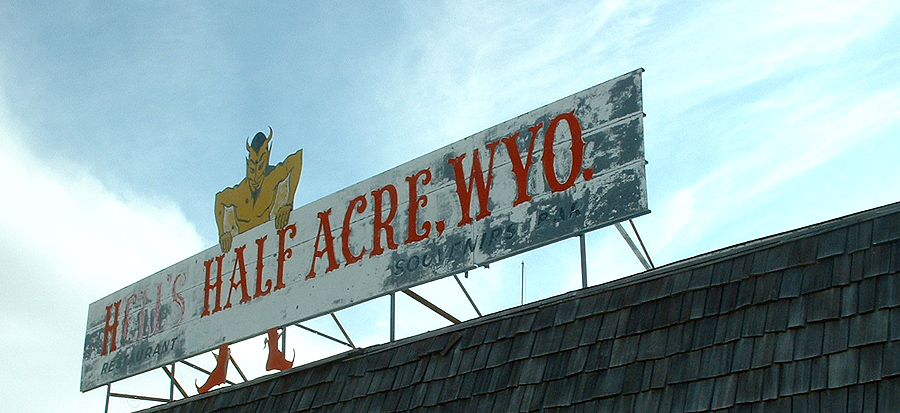
The sign on the restaurant formerly located at Hell's Half Acre.

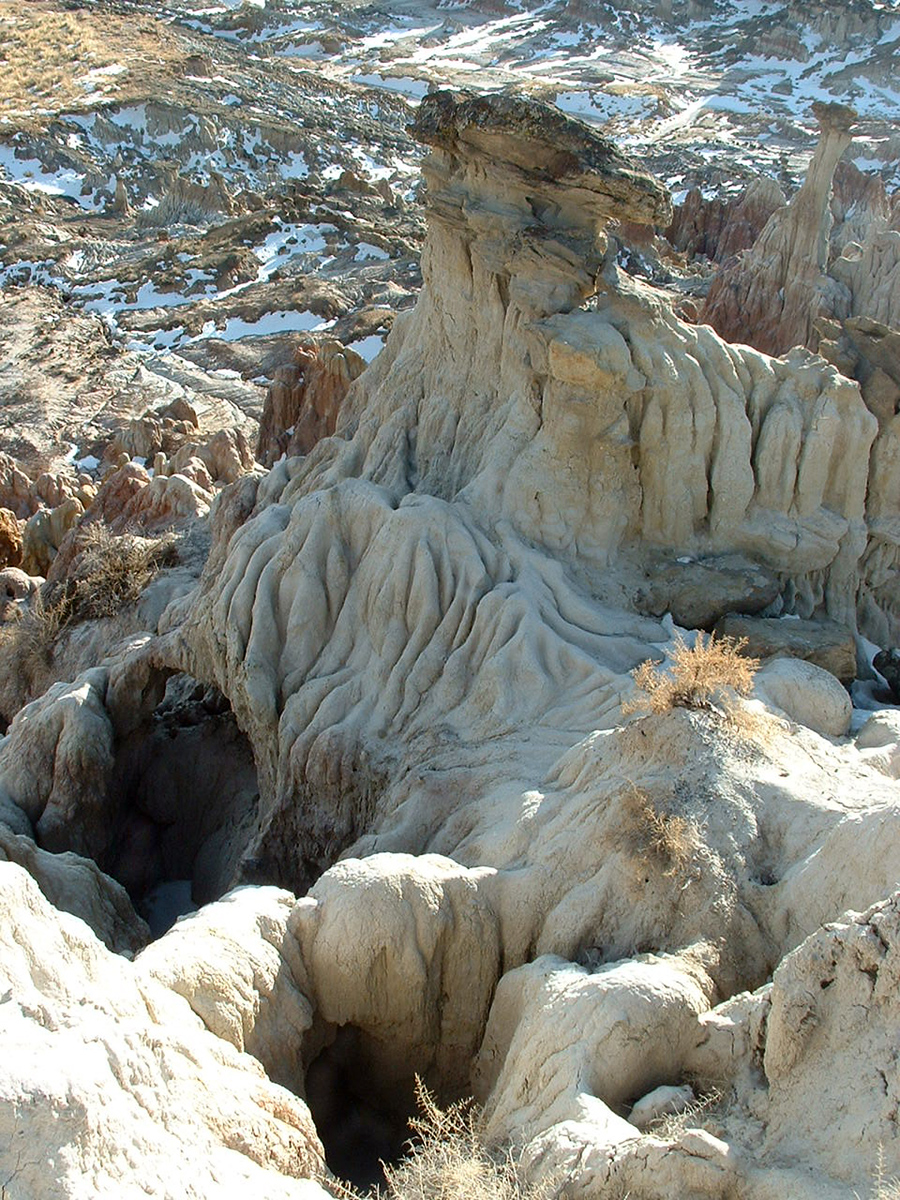
A vertical formation just off the overlook.

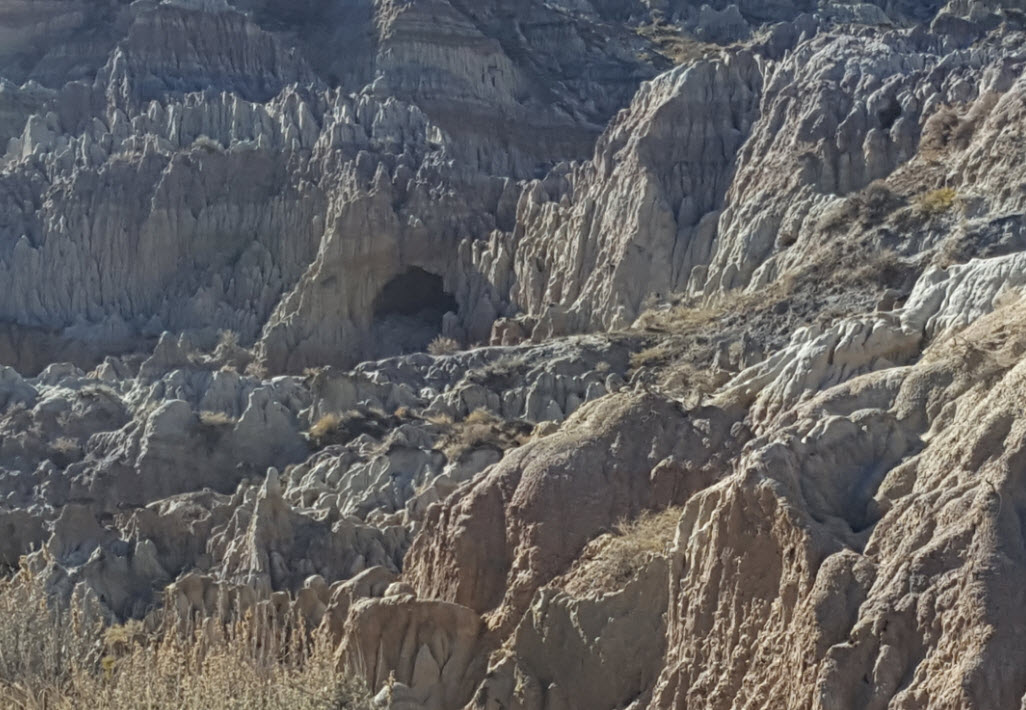
A cave formation in Hell's Half Acre.

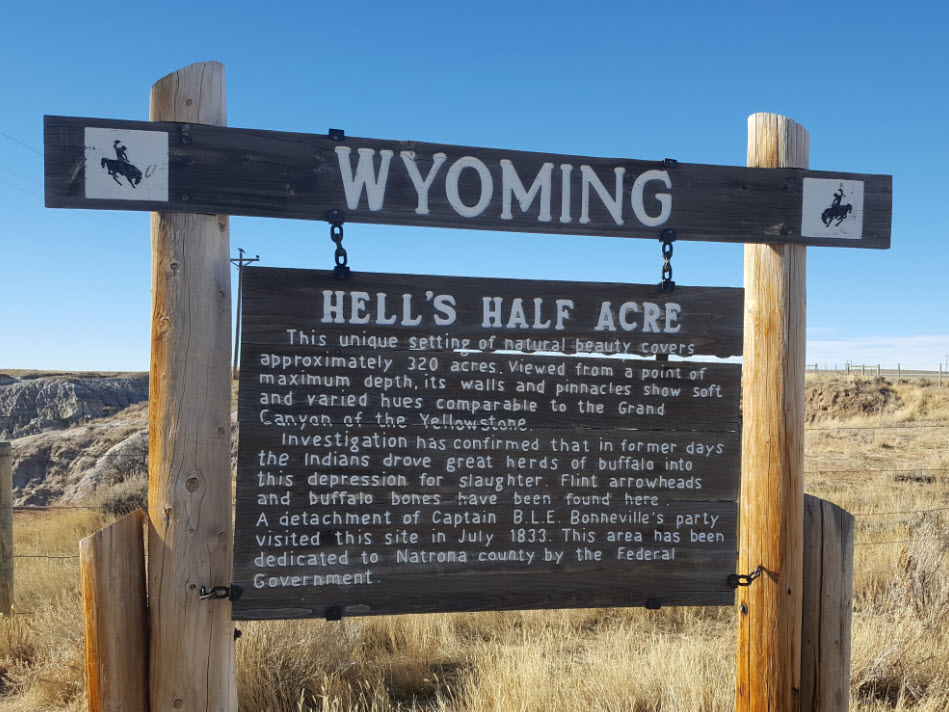
Interpretive sign marking Hell's Half Acre.

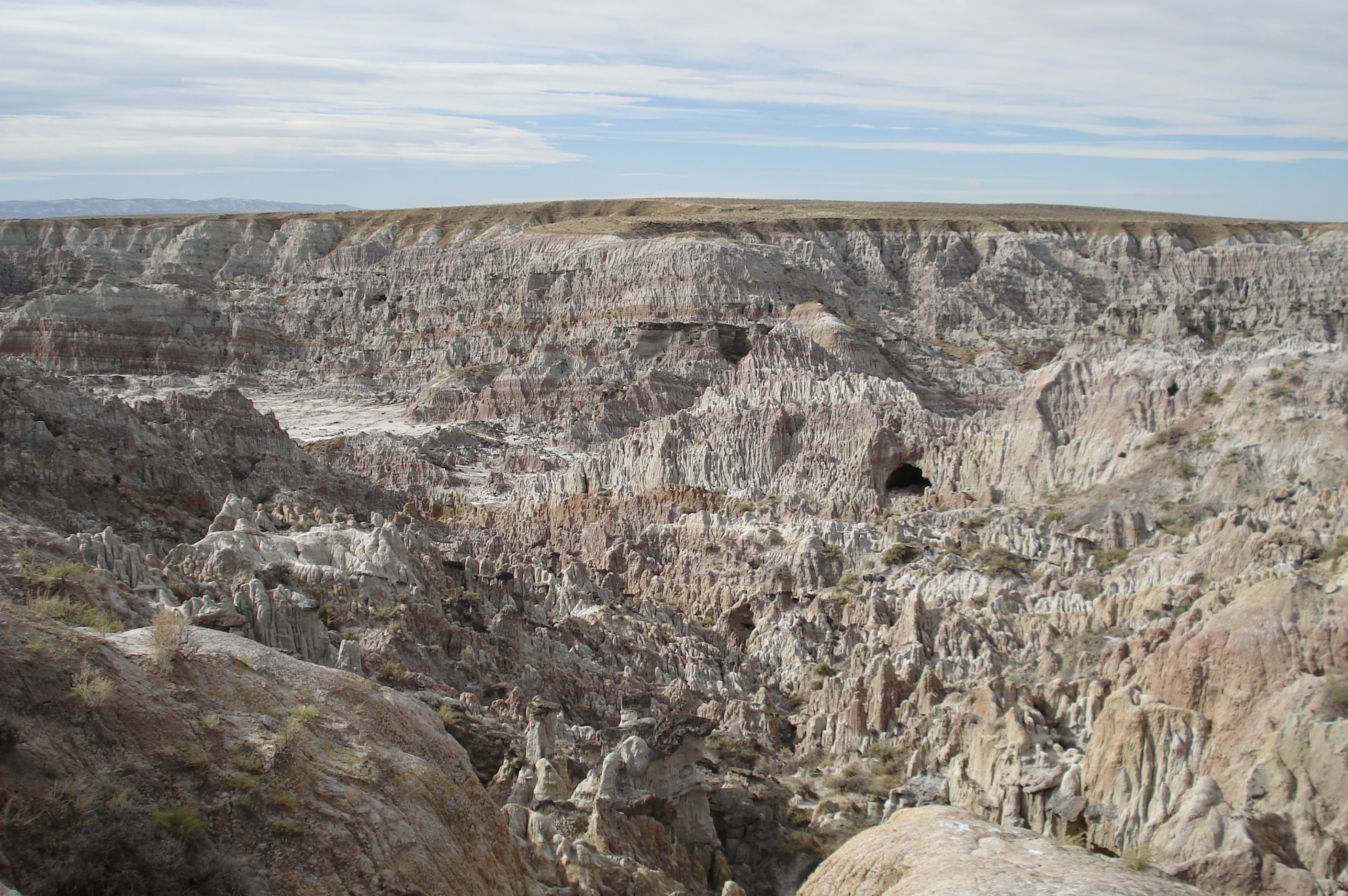
Wind River Formation exposed at Hell's Half Acre

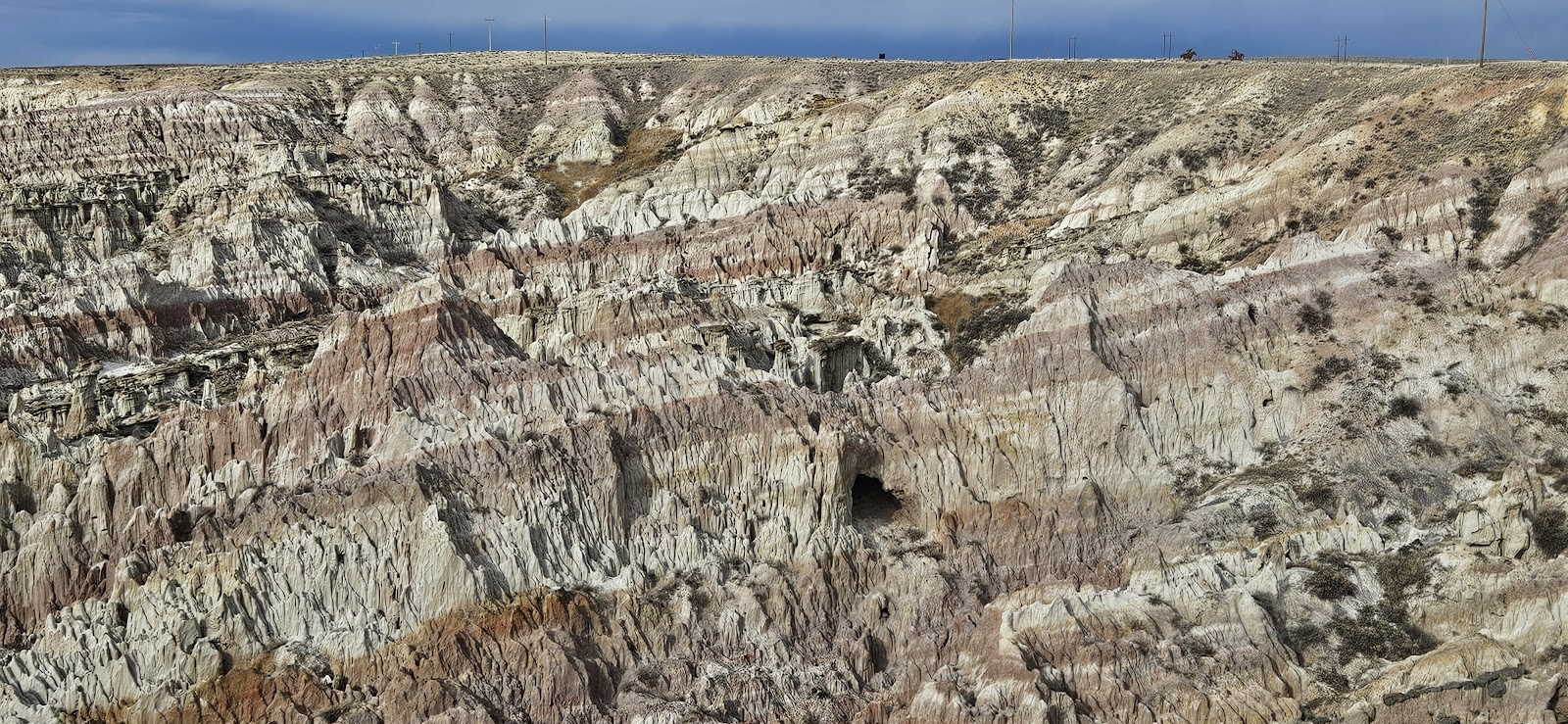
Unique colors of Hell's Half Acre

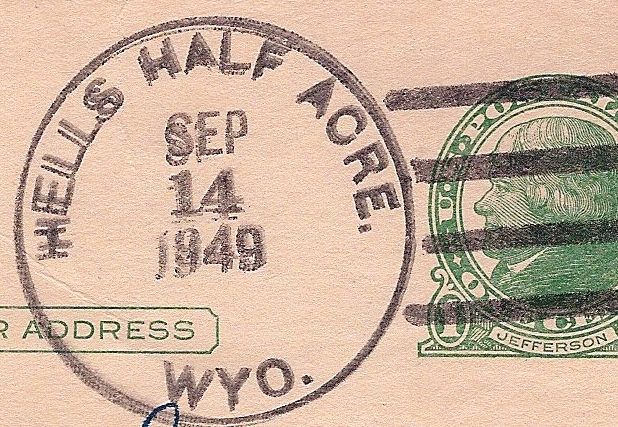
Postmark
