= Goose Egg, Wyoming =

Goose Egg
- Unincorporated community
- Location within the state of Wyoming Goose Egg (the United States)
- Coordinates: 42°45′45″N 106°29′12″W
- Country: United States
- State: Wyoming
- County: Natrona
- Elevation: 4,026 ft (1,227 m)
- Time zone: UTC-7 (Mountain (MST))
  - Summer (DST): UTC-6 (MST)
- GNIS feature ID: 1597334

Goose Egg is an unincorporated community located in Natrona County, Wyoming, United States. It appears to have been named for a natural feature, namely, a nest of goose eggs laid by a Canada goose.

Goose Egg lies within Natrona County School District Number 1. It once had a post office, which has closed as of 2016. The United States Geological Survey had a water station at Coal Creek near Goose Egg, from the 1960s through the 1980s.

Goose Egg was the residence of songwriter Albert Norton, composer of Our boys are marching again, a patriotic ditty composed in 1943 during World War II.
