= Starship Troopers (film) =

1997 film by Paul Verhoeven

- Theatrical release poster
- Directed by: Paul Verhoeven
- Screenplay by: Edward Neumeier
- Based on: Starship Troopers by Robert A. Heinlein
- Produced by: Alan Marshall; Jon Davison
- Starring: Casper Van Dien; Dina Meyer; Denise Richards; Jake Busey; Neil Patrick Harris; Patrick Muldoon; Michael Ironside
- Cinematography: Jost Vacano
- Edited by: Mark Goldblatt; Caroline Ross
- Music by: Basil Poledouris
- Production companies: TriStar Pictures; Touchstone Pictures
- Distributed by: TriStar Pictures
- Release dates: November 4, 1997 (Westwood); November 7, 1997 (United States)
- Running time: 129 minutes
- Country: United States
- Language: English
- Budget: $100–110 million
- Box office: $121 million

Starship Troopers is a 1997 American science fiction action film directed by Paul Verhoeven and written by Edward Neumeier, based on the 1959 novel by Robert A. Heinlein. Set in the 23rd century, the story follows teenager Johnny Rico and his comrades as they serve in the military of the United Citizen Federation, an Earth-based world government engaged in an interstellar war against an alien species known as the Arachnids. The film stars Casper Van Dien, Dina Meyer, Denise Richards, Jake Busey, Neil Patrick Harris, Patrick Muldoon, and Michael Ironside.

Development of Starship Troopers began in 1991 as Bug Hunt at Outpost 7, written by Neumeier. After recognizing similarities between Neumeier's script and Heinlein's book, producer Jon Davison suggested aligning the script more closely with the novel to garner greater interest from studio executives. Despite these efforts, development was slow, with studios hesitant to fund the costly project right up to the start of filming. Principal photography took place between April and October 1996 on a $100–110 million budget, of which nearly half was spent on the extensive computer-generated imagery (CGI) and practical effects required to vivify the Arachnid creatures.

Released on November 7, 1997, Starship Troopers faced critical backlash, with reviewers interpreting the film as endorsing fascism and disparaging its violence and cast performances. Despite initial box office success, ticket sales slowed down amid negative reviews and unfavorable word of mouth, culminating in a $121 million total gross against its budget, which made it the 34th-highest-grossing film of 1997. The disappointing performance of Starship Troopers was blamed, in part, on competition from a high number of successful or anticipated science fiction and genre films released that year, its satire and violence failing to connect with mainstream audiences, and ineffective marketing.

Since its release, Starship Troopers has been critically re-evaluated, and it is now considered a cult classic and a prescient satire of fascism and authoritarian governance that has grown in relevance. The film launched a multimedia franchise that includes four sequels—Starship Troopers 2: Hero of the Federation (2004), Starship Troopers 3: Marauder (2008), Starship Troopers: Invasion (2012), and Starship Troopers: Traitor of Mars (2017)—as well as a 1999 animated television series, video games, comics, and a variety of merchandise.

== Plot ==
In the future, (Note: In the director's commentary available on the Starship Troopers DVD release, Paul Verhoeven states the film takes place in the 23rd century.) Earth is governed by the United Citizen Federation, a stratocratic regime founded generations earlier by "veterans" after democracy and social scientists brought civilization to the brink of ruin. Citizenship is exclusively earned through federal service, which grants rights—like voting and procreation—that are withheld from ordinary civilians. Humans, who are now capable of interstellar travel, conduct colonization missions throughout the galaxy, bringing them into conflict with a race of highly evolved insectoid creatures dubbed "Arachnids" or, derisively, "bugs".

Against his parents' objections, teenage jock Johnny Rico enlists in the Mobile Infantry to remain close to his girlfriend, spaceship pilot Carmen Ibanez. Their psychic friend Carl Jenkins joins military intelligence, while Isabelle "Dizzy" Flores—who is in love with Rico—deliberately transfers to his squad. Carmen ends her relationship with Rico due to their diverging career paths and her growing feelings for a fellow pilot, Zander Barcalow. During training, Rico impresses his drill sergeant, Zim, earning a promotion to squad leader. However, Rico makes a mistake during a training exercise, which leads to the death of a squad member and the resignation of another, resulting in Rico's demotion and flogging. Disheartened, Rico quits, but re-enlists after learning that an asteroid sent by the Arachnids has destroyed Buenos Aires, killing millions, including his parents.

An invasion force is deployed to Klendathu, the Arachnids' home planet, but military intelligence underestimates the Arachnids' defensive abilities, leading to hundreds of thousands of human casualties. Badly wounded, Rico is rescued by Lieutenant Jean Rasczak, his former high school teacher, but is mistakenly reported dead, devastating Carmen. Following his recovery, Rico, Dizzy, and squadmate Ace Levy join Rasczak's elite unit, the Roughnecks. After Rico defeats a gigantic "Tanker Bug" on the disputed planet of Tango Urilla, he is elevated to the rank of corporal for his valor and begins a romantic relationship with Dizzy.

Responding to a distress signal on the Arachnid-controlled Planet P, the Roughnecks discover an Arachnid-ravaged outpost and are ambushed by the bugs. Carmen and Zander recover the surviving Roughnecks by dropship, but not before Dizzy is fatally impaled by an Arachnid and Rico mercy kills the mutilated Rasczak. The group returns to the fleet assembled in orbit above P, where Dizzy is eulogized.

Jenkins, now a colonel, reveals the Roughnecks were deliberately ordered into the trap, justifying it as a necessary sacrifice to confirm the existence of a "Brain Bug", an intelligent Arachnid strategically directing the others. He assigns Rico command of the Roughnecks and field-promotes him to lieutenant, instructing him to return to P and capture the Brain Bug. As the battle commences, Carmen's ship is destroyed by the Arachnids; she and Zander escape in an escape pod, but it crashes into an underground tunnel system. The pair are captured by the Arachnids, and the Brain Bug consumes Zander's brain, killing him and absorbing his knowledge. Rico directs his squad to complete their mission while he, Ace, and their squadmate Watkins rescue Carmen and hold the Arachnids at bay with a miniature nuclear bomb.

The Brain Bug escapes while the Arachnids attack and fatally wound Watkins, who sacrifices himself by detonating the bomb while his teammates escape. On the surface, they learn that Zim has captured the Brain Bug and the assembled troops rejoice as Jenkins psychically detects it is afraid. A propaganda broadcast details how the Brain Bug is being invasively studied to learn its secrets and ensure humanity's victory. The ad encourages viewers to enlist and do their part in the war so they can become like Carmen, now captain of her own ship, and Rico, who enthusiastically leads his troops into another battle.

== Cast ==
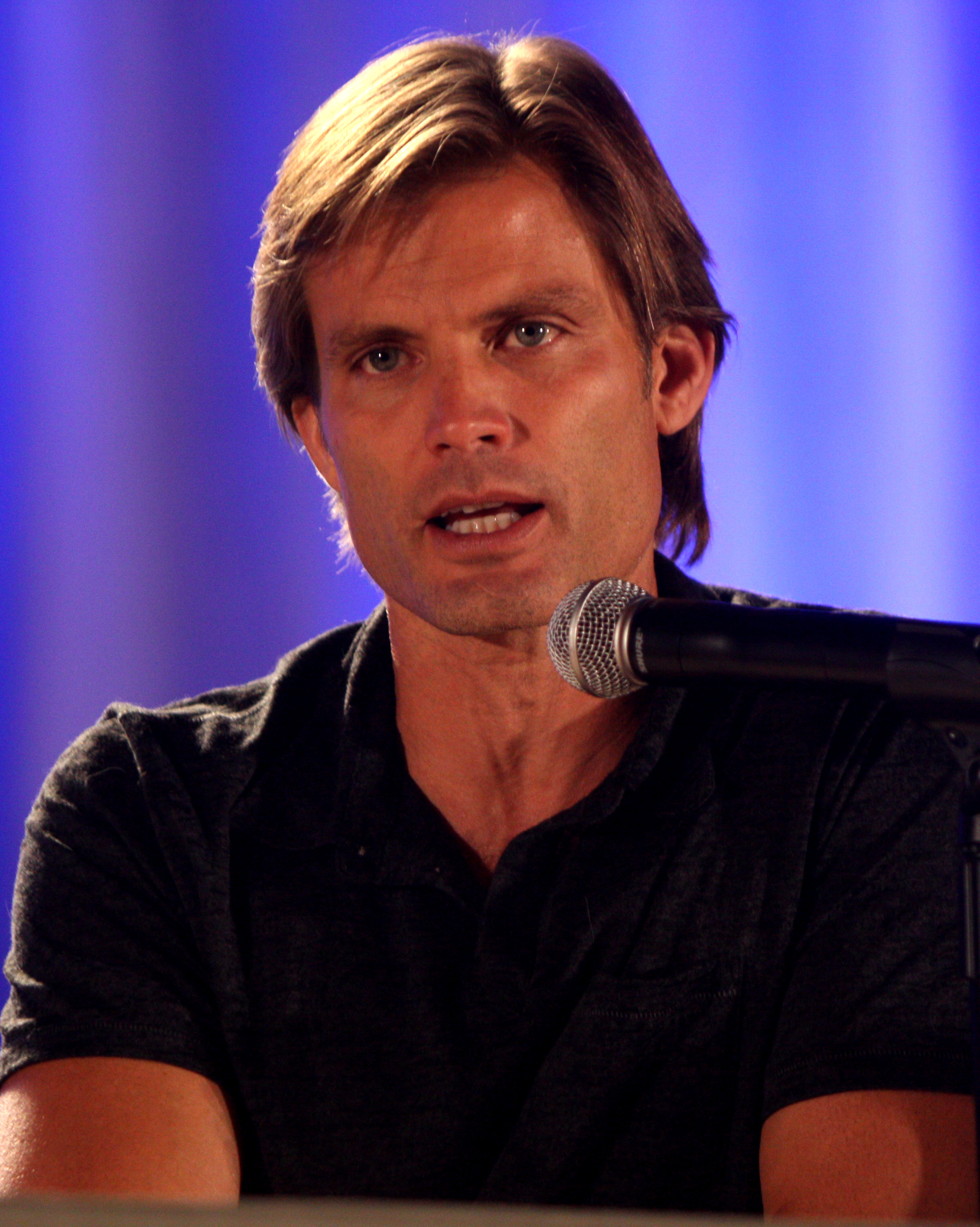
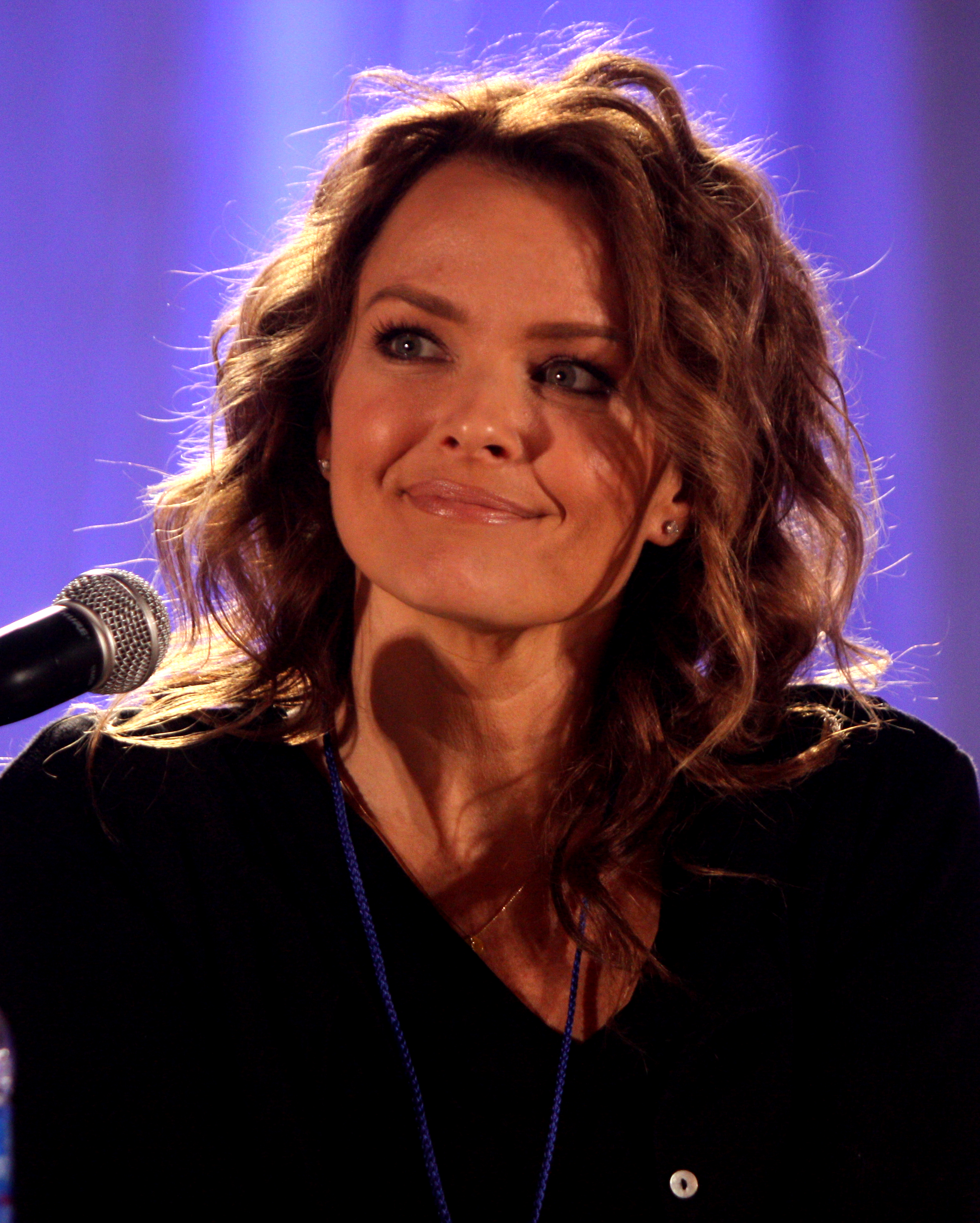
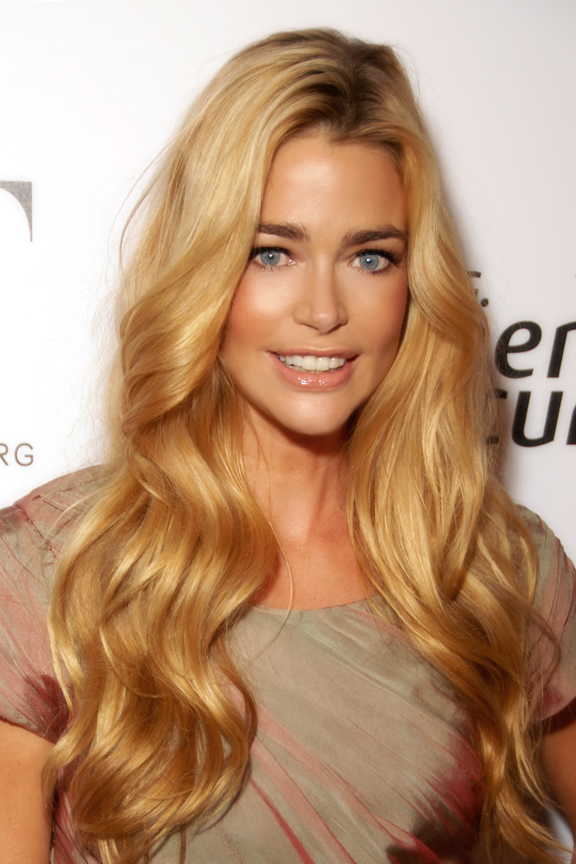
(Left to right) Casper Van Dien (pictured in 2012), Dina Meyer (2012), and Denise Richards (2009)
- Casper Van Dien as Johnny Rico, a school sports star turned infantryman
- Dina Meyer as Dizzy Flores, Rico's former classmate who joins the Mobile Infantry to stay close to him
- Denise Richards as Carmen Ibanez, an aspiring starship pilot and Rico's girlfriend
- Jake Busey as Ace Levy, an infantryman
- Neil Patrick Harris as Carl Jenkins, a psychic who joins military intelligence.
- Clancy Brown as Sergeant Zim, Rico's drill sergeant during training
- Seth Gilliam as Sugar Watkins, a member of the Roughnecks special forces unit
- Patrick Muldoon as Zander Barcalow, Rico's rival who is romantically interested in Carmen
- Michael Ironside as Jean Rasczak, a former teacher turned squad leader

Infantry characters include Blake Lindsley as Katrina, Tami-Adrian George as Djana'd, Eric Bruskotter as Breckinridge, Matt Levin as Kitten Smith, and Anthony Ruivivar as Shujumi. The rest of the cast includes Rue McClanahan as a biology teacher, Marshall Bell as General Owen, Brenda Strong as Captain Deladier, and Dean Norris as Commanding Officer. Christopher Curry and Lenore Kasdorf appear as Mr. and Mrs. Rico, while Bruce Gray and Denise Dowse appear as Sky Marshals Dienes and Meru. Corporals Bronski and Birdie are portrayed by Teo Smoot and Ungela Brockman, Sergeant Gillespie by Curnal Aulisio, and Robert David Hall portrays a heavily disfigured Recruitment Sergeant. Amy Smart appears as a pilot cadet, and Timothy Omundson portrays a psychic.

Cameo appearances include producer Jon Davison as an Angry Survivor of the Buenos Aires asteroid attack, and writer Edward Neumeier as a handcuffed prisoner standing before Federation judges. Verhoeven's assistant, Stacy Lumbrezer, appears as a smiling woman during a psychic advertisement, and Paul Sammon, author of The Making of Starship Troopers, appears as a man feeding a cow to an Arachnid.

== Production ==
=== Development as Bug Hunt at Outpost 7 ===
Since the release of RoboCop (1987), producer Jon Davison had aimed to develop another project that would reunite key members of its creative team, including writer Edward Neumeier and stop motion animator Phil Tippett. Neumeier and his co-writer Michael Miner had struggled to develop new story ideas in the intervening years and, realizing their partnership was no longer effective, Neumeier began working alone on a story treatment titled Bug Hunt at Outpost 7. His treatment was intended to be a comedic, jingoistic, and xenophobic war film pitting the heroes against insects—chosen due to his wife's fear of them—set against the backdrop of a teenage romance story.

In December 1991, Neumeier brought his treatment to Davison at Warner Bros. Studios, Burbank, which also headquartered TriStar Pictures, with whom Davison had a pre-existing development deal. Davison realized the treatment bore similarities to the 1959 science fiction novel, Starship Troopers, by Robert A. Heinlein. The novel had received a strongly divided reception on its release for promoting military power and necessary violence while criticizing liberal social programs, but had remained a popular work. Neumeier and Davison considered directly adapting Starship Troopers, but Davison assumed the film adaptation rights would already be taken and encouraged Neumeier to continue with his treatment, retitled Outpost 7.

By late 1992, Neumeier had completed the Outpost 7 treatment, alternatively known as Bug Hunt. Davison presented it to TriStar executive Chris Lee, who rejected it. Neumeier and Davison learned that the rights for Starship Troopers were available and instead pitched an adaptation of the novel using elements of Outpost 7. Lee was more receptive, and the pair also gained support from other executives, including TriStar head of production Mike Medavoy, who had supported their work on RoboCop. The rights to Starship Troopers were purchased and Neumeier began adapting Outpost 7 to more closely fit Heinlein's novel.

=== Development as Starship Troopers ===
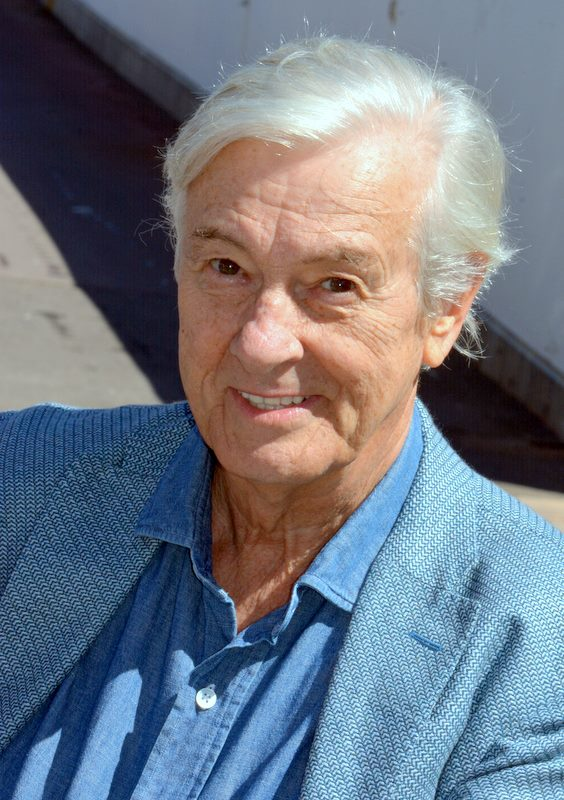
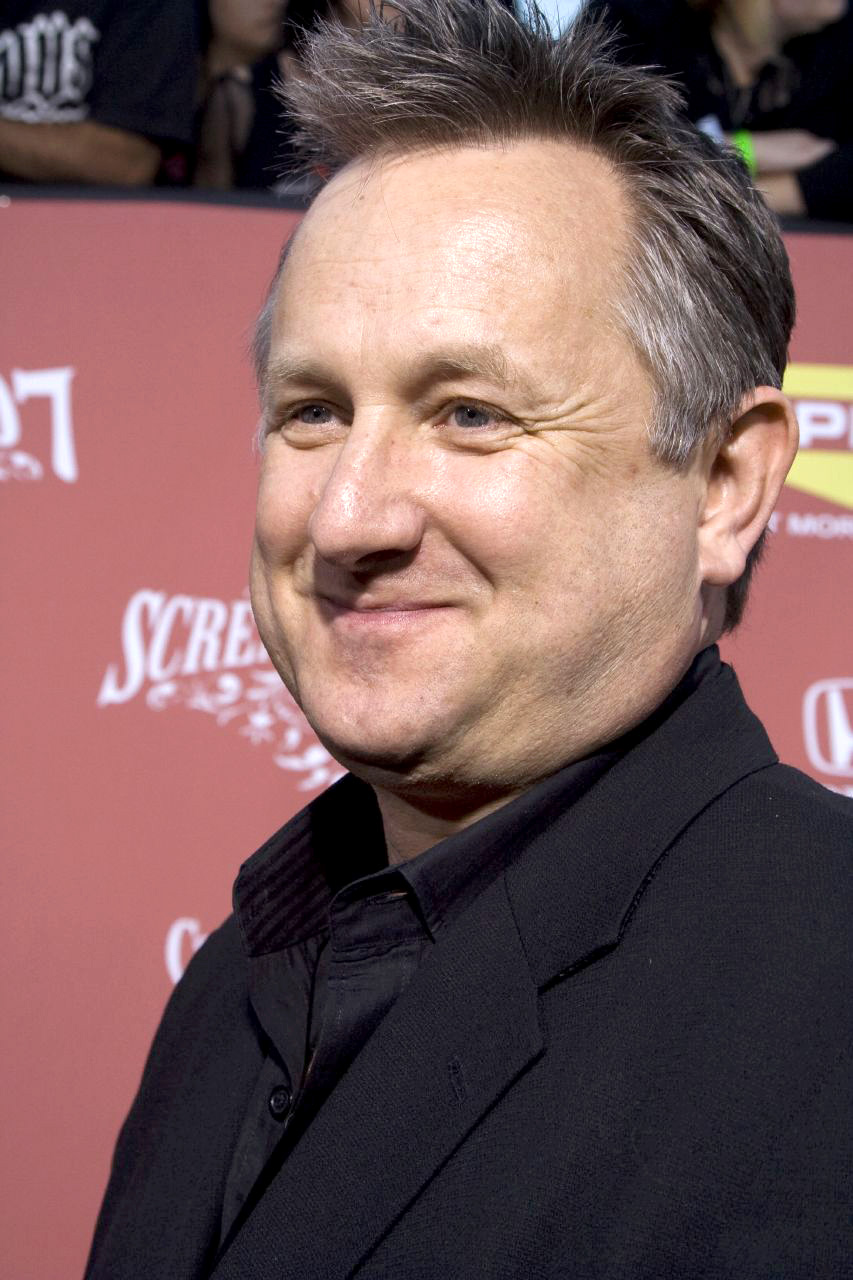
Director Paul Verhoeven (left, pictured in 2016) and writer Edward Neumeier (2007)

Progress was slow as TriStar regularly replaced executives, including Medavoy, and high cost or risk projects, like Starship Troopers, were more closely scrutinized. Davison spent much of 1993 securing several key crew including Tippett and RoboCop director Paul Verhoeven. Neumeier and Davison said Verhoeven was their only choice to direct Starship Troopers because they determined the fantastical creatures, genre, and political subtext suited his creative sensibilities. (Note: Attributed to multiple references:) Verhoeven recruited Alan Marshall as a producer, having worked with him on Basic Instinct (1992) and his most recent project Showgirls (1995). Despite Verhoeven's previous successes leading into the early 1990s, he was in need of a promising project as his efforts to develop the pirate adventure Mistress of the Seas and the Arnold Schwarzenegger-starring Crusade had failed. Showgirls would go on to fail financially and earn him the worst reviews of his career.

By 1994, TriStar remained reluctant to move Starship Troopers into pre-production. Key crew members, including Davison and Verhoeven, decided to produce test footage to demonstrate their intended visual style and tone. TriStar paid $225,000 toward development of the "Bug Test", a brief scene filmed at Vasquez Rocks near Los Angeles on July 21, 1994. Although still busy filming Showgirls, Verhoeven directed the sequence, which was filmed by John Hora and a 30-person crew. The sequence depicts a soldier (played by Mitch Gaylord) being pursued and killed by two Warrior Bugs, which were animated by Tippett Studio; Neumeier makes a cameo appearance as a dead soldier. The visual effects were finished by September, and the footage screened for TriStar executives in early October. Executives including Lee and Mark Canton were impressed with the visual effects and did not realize they were computer-generated imagery (CGI). They approved moving into pre-production, but other executives remained non-committal on providing any substantial funding.

In early 1995, Davison developed a detailed budget totalling $90 million, based on Neumeier's third draft. TriStar rejected this amount, citing the financial failure of the $200 million-budgeted Waterworld (1995), which resulted in the firing of several executives at Universal Pictures. TriStar executives determined that, to move forward, the cost of Starship Troopers had to be split with a business partner. Davison screened the Bug Test for potential suitors, attracting the interest of Walt Disney Studios. An agreement was reached between TriStar, its parent company Sony Pictures, and Disney to produce Starship Troopers via TriStar and Disney's Touchstone Pictures, splitting the budget costs and box office profits evenly, in exchange for Touchstone receiving all distribution rights to the film outside the United States and Canada. Each studio was also given creative input on the film and its marketing.

=== Writing ===
Neumeier began adapting the Starship Troopers novel at the beginning of 1993, working from his office in Eagle Rock, Los Angeles. He was concerned about how to translate the tone of Heinlein's work because of the controversy surrounding its release, which identified Heinlein as alternately a conservative, militarist, libertarian, and fascist. The novel espouses the benefits of military service, citizenship, and masculinity. Heinlein described the central theme as being "that a man, to be truly human, must be unhesitatingly willing at all times to lay down his life for his fellow man. [This theme] is based on the twin concepts of love and duty—and how they are related to the survival of our race". Neumeier and Davison wanted to accurately depict the novel's viewpoint and believed that audiences would appreciate the concept of a failing democracy and stricter cultural controls.

Certain aspects of the novel were challenging for Neumeier to adapt. While he considered the first and third acts narratively strong, he felt the middle act—focusing on Rico's boot camp experience—was an overly long piece preaching to Heinlein's readership, which would not translate well to film. To address this, he identified key elements such as the high school opening, boot camp, battles, and the underlying philosophy and sociopolitics. To compensate for the slower second act, he expanded on certain themes, including the teenage romance, drawing from his own experiences of pursuing women who had no interest in him. The first draft was completed on July 8, 1993. It remained generally faithful to Heinlein's novel, including a secondary alien race known as the "Skinnies"; the "Bounce", a technology allowing infantry members to make jet-assisted superhuman jumps; and power armor, which granted the troops superhuman strength. A copy was sent to Heinlein's wife, who was pleased with it.

Verhoeven tried, and failed, to read the novel, finding it uninteresting and too politically right-wing. He had Neumeier summarize the narrative, and found it militaristic, fascistic, and overly supportive of armed conflict, which clashed with Verhoeven's childhood experiences in the German-occupied Netherlands during World War II. (Note: Attributed to multiple references:) Verhoeven decided to use the basic plot to satirize and undermine the book's themes by deconstructing the concepts of totalitarianism, fascism, and militarism, saying: "All the way through I wanted the audience to be asking, 'Are [the characters] crazy?'" (Note: Attributed to multiple references:) His contributions to Neumeier's second draft included developing the romantic subplot between Rico and Carmen, and combining the male character Dizzy with a Neumeier-created female character called Ronnie who was romantically interested in Rico. This, in turn, led Neumeier to develop romantic triangles between Dizzy, Rico, Carmen, and Zander.

The Skinnies were removed, because Verhoeven thought depicting an additional alien race would be confusing, while queen bugs and advanced canines called neo-dogs were considered financially unviable. Other financially motivated changes included the removal of the Bounce and the Drop, a method of inserting troops from orbit in capsules that shed consecutive layers during landing. Preliminary designs were made of the capsules, but attached to parachutes, which did not match the intended aesthetic, and adding rockets was deemed impractical, because it would have required numerous different visual effects and taken too much time to accomplish. In addition to cost, the Bounce was removed, because the troops would look like they were on pogo sticks and it made it too easy to avoid Arachnid attacks. The Arachnids were made more insect-like, as Verhoeven did not want them to wield weaponry or act like humanoids. The most controversial omission from the novel, for fans, was the power armor. Davison said that despite the importance of the armor, it was financially impossible to create hundreds of suits for the cast and extras. He and Verhoeven initially agreed to use the power armor sparingly, and integrate various different ideas such as the Bounce into them, but later determined it gave the troops too much of a combat advantage.

The FedNet sequences, the main source of information in the future, were invented for the film, representing how Neumeier believed television and computers would eventually be combined. Neumeier completed his third and final draft by early 1995. Verhoeven described the script as being about contemporary American politics, such as a lack of gun control and increasing capital punishment under Texas governor George W. Bush, which he believed could potentially lead to fascism. The characters of Starship Troopers, he said, were "fascists who aren't aware of their fascism". He said: "If I tell the world that a right-wing, fascist way of doing things doesn't work, no one will listen to me. So I'm going to make a perfect fascist world: everyone is beautiful, everything is shiny, everything has big guns and fancy ships but it's only good for killing fucking Bugs!"

=== Pre-production ===
Under the company name Big Bug Pictures, the Starship Troopers team worked in a large suite in the Astaire Building at Sony Pictures Studios in Culver City, California. While pre-production began in earnest by September 1995, after Verhoeven concluded work on Showgirls, he had already spent several months producing over 4,000 storyboard images of the Starship Troopers script. Conscious that the Arachnids, among other CGI elements, would be added after filming, he wanted a detailed image of how each scene would be set out during filming. Storyboard artists Robin Richesson and Giacomo Ghiazzi refined Verhoeven's storyboards, the majority of the comic book–style art being done by Ghiazzi.

Many key crew members were hired in 1996, including Verhoeven's long-time cinematographer Jost Vacano, as well as Vic Armstrong (second unit director and stunt coordinator), Mark Goldblatt (editor), John Richardson (special effects supervisor), Basil Poledouris (music composer), and Robert Latham Brown (production manager). Tippett also hired the nearly 100 additional staff required to realize the Arachnids, including Craig Hayes (visual effects artist) and Trey Stokes (animation department head). Davison's responsibilities focused on the special effects, while Marshall was concerned more with the filming.

Production designer Allan Cameron and location manager Bill Bowling scouted several filming locations, but rejected most as they did not consider them particularly unique. Others, such as the Valley of Fire State Park in Nevada, had too many environmental restrictions which could delay filming, and obtaining the necessary permits was slow due to an extended period of U.S. government shutdowns. Bowling identified Hell's Half Acre, located just outside Casper, Wyoming, which offered colorful buttes and pinnacles to portray the alien planets of Klendathu and Planet P, although it was rife with rattlesnakes. The location was remote, about 45 miles (72 km) or an hour's drive from the production office and hotels for the cast and crew. It offered other logistical challenges as it was generally undeveloped land, requiring the production to build roads for the trucks carrying gear into the canyons for filming. Anything that could not be transported by road was lowered by helicopter. Construction of some on-location sets such as Whiskey Outpost camp began in February 1996 and took six weeks. The local government was supportive of the project, subsidizing the building of the roads and camp.

Another, more easily accessible location, Barry Barber Ranch near Kadoka, South Dakota, and the Badlands National Park, featured little vegetation and a smooth, undulating landscape, which was chosen to portray Tango Urilla. As pre-production continued, Davison remained concerned about TriStar's ongoing executive turnover and its inconsistent commitment to funding. Verhoeven believed the repeated regime changes at the studio worked in their favor, as the project was overlooked until it was too late to cancel it. (Note: Attributed to multiple references:)

=== Casting ===
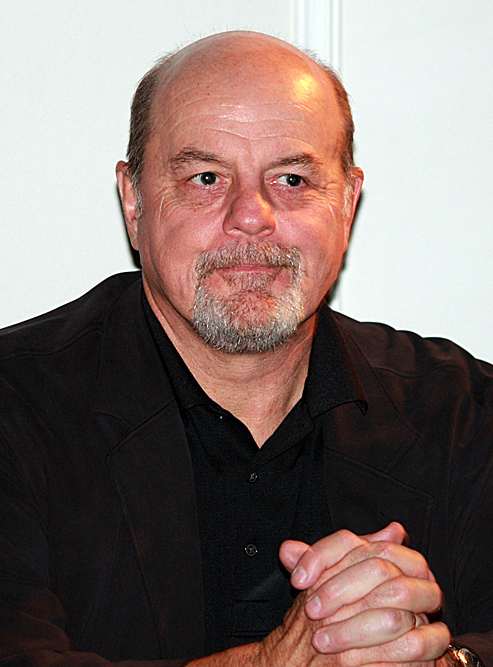
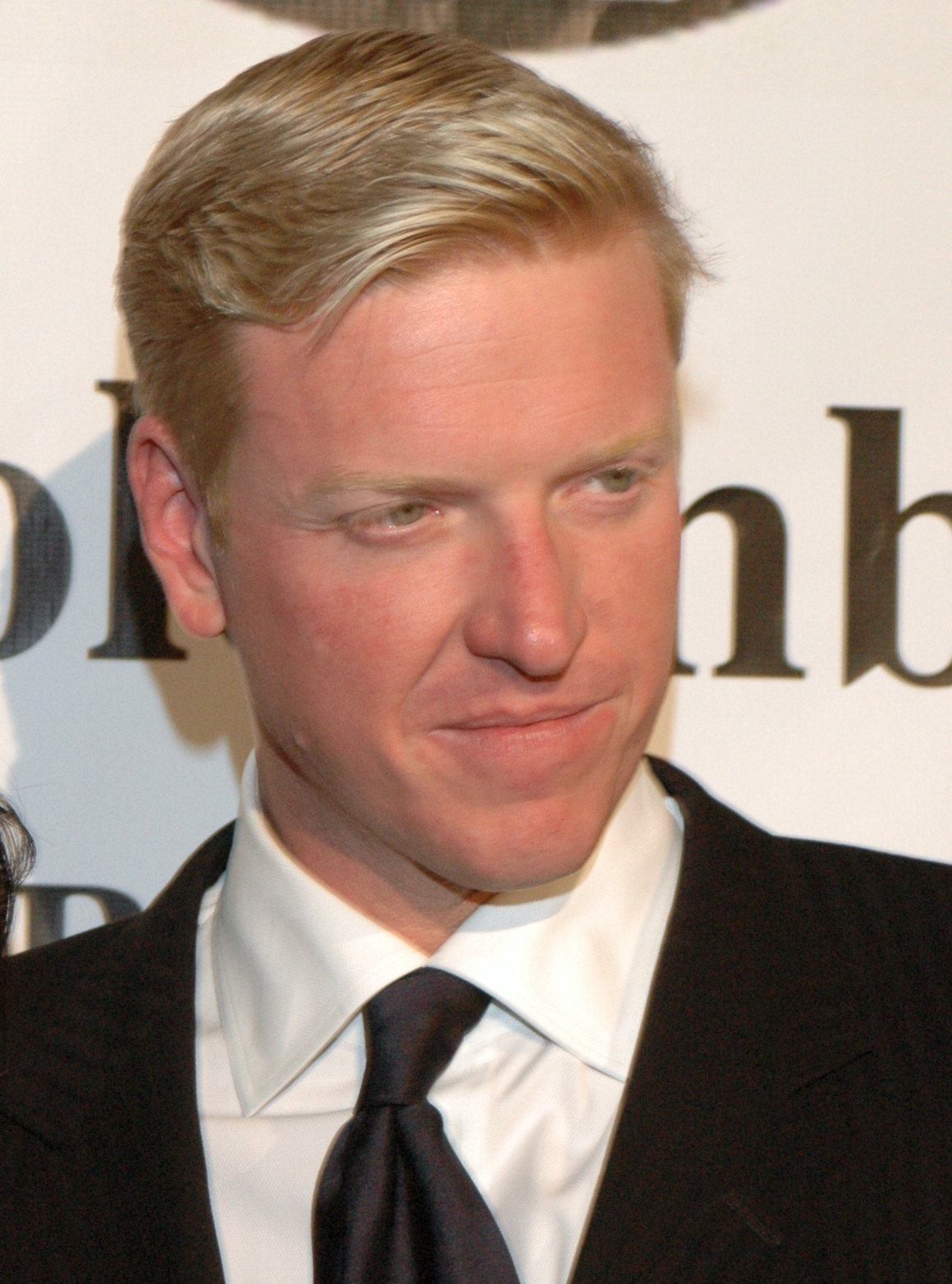
(Left to right) Michael Ironside and Jake Busey (both pictured in 2009). They portrayed Lieutenant Jean Rasczak, and Private Ace Levy, respectively.

Verhoeven wanted a cast who visually embodied the Aryan, blonde, blue-eyed, and beautiful image he had perceived in the Nazi propaganda films Triumph of the Will (1935) and Olympia (1938) by Leni Riefenstahl. (Note: Attributed to multiple references:) He focused on popular film actors in their late teens and early twenties, but realized that many of the contemporary stars he wanted, such as Chris O'Donnell and Christian Slater, were already in their thirties—which would make the characters seem less naive—or committed to other projects. Although television actors were still generally overlooked when casting films, the production looked at shows such as Melrose Place and Beverly Hills, 90210, which featured young, photogenic, but less well known actors, such as Casper Van Dien, Denise Richards, and Dina Meyer.

Van Dien performed five auditions for the Rico role, and underwent eight months of training after securing it, gaining 5 lb (2.3 kg) of muscle and losing 3.5 in (8.9 cm) from his waist. Mark Wahlberg and Matt Damon also auditioned, but Verhoeven believed Van Dien closely fit the Riefenstahl aesthetic. Richards also performed five auditions to portray Carmen in November and December 1995, before finally screen testing against Van Dien. Meyer's agent recommended auditioning for Carmen, but she wanted to portray Dizzy because she thought she could convey the character's "heart" and vulnerability at being overlooked by Rico because her toughness makes her seem like just another guy.

Neil Patrick Harris was mainly known for portraying a child doctor on Doogie Howser, M.D. (1989–1993), and wanted a project that would shed that image as he moved into his adult career. He described Jenkins as almost two separate characters, Rico's geeky and funny friend who becomes worn, pale, and troubled by his responsibilities. Making his feature film debut, Patrick Muldoon described his character Zander as ambiguous and competitive, while Verhoeven and Neumeier saw him as possessing a darker side. Jake Busey considered Ace Levy to be an integral character necessary for releasing the tension for the audience by finding the humor in macabre situations. Seth Gilliam said his character is like a Vietnam War veteran who cannot adapt to life outside war.

Clancy Brown portrays Sergeant Zim, a "crusty, macho, jingoistic, ultimately admirable drill instructor". Brown based his performance on archetypical drill instructors from military films such as The D.I. (1957) and Full Metal Jacket (1987), as well as taking guidance from retired Marine captain Dale Dye, who said that Brown should act as if his soldiers are watching his every move. Verhoeven was a fan of Michael Ironside, having attempted to cast him in RoboCop and giving him a central role in Total Recall (1990). Ironside's Jean Rasczak appears early in Starship Troopers to set the tone, and was an original creation combining two characters from the novel: Rico's teacher, Lieutenant Colonel Jean V. Dubois, and Lieutenant Rasczak, a heroic soldier.

Members of the principal cast, including Van Dien, Meyer, Busey, Gilliam and Curnal Aulisio, and 24 extras undertook twelve days of military training, led by Dye, from April 17, 1996, to the start of filming. Conducted in Hell's Half Acre, the training included basic combat skills and tactics as Dye perceived they may evolve centuries in the future. Activities included a daily 3-mile (4.8 km) run, marching, and weapon handling. Those involved slept in open-air military tents, dealing with the harsh conditions, including 2 ft (0.61 m) of snow and ice following a blizzard, and windstorms. Extra Julia Rupkalvis's experience during the training led to her becoming a key assistant to Dye while training the hundreds of extras portraying troopers. As Richards was not in the infantry cast, she did not have to participate, but chose to anyway, later remarking how she, Van Dien, and Busey bonded while huddling together for warmth during the blizzard.

=== Filming ===
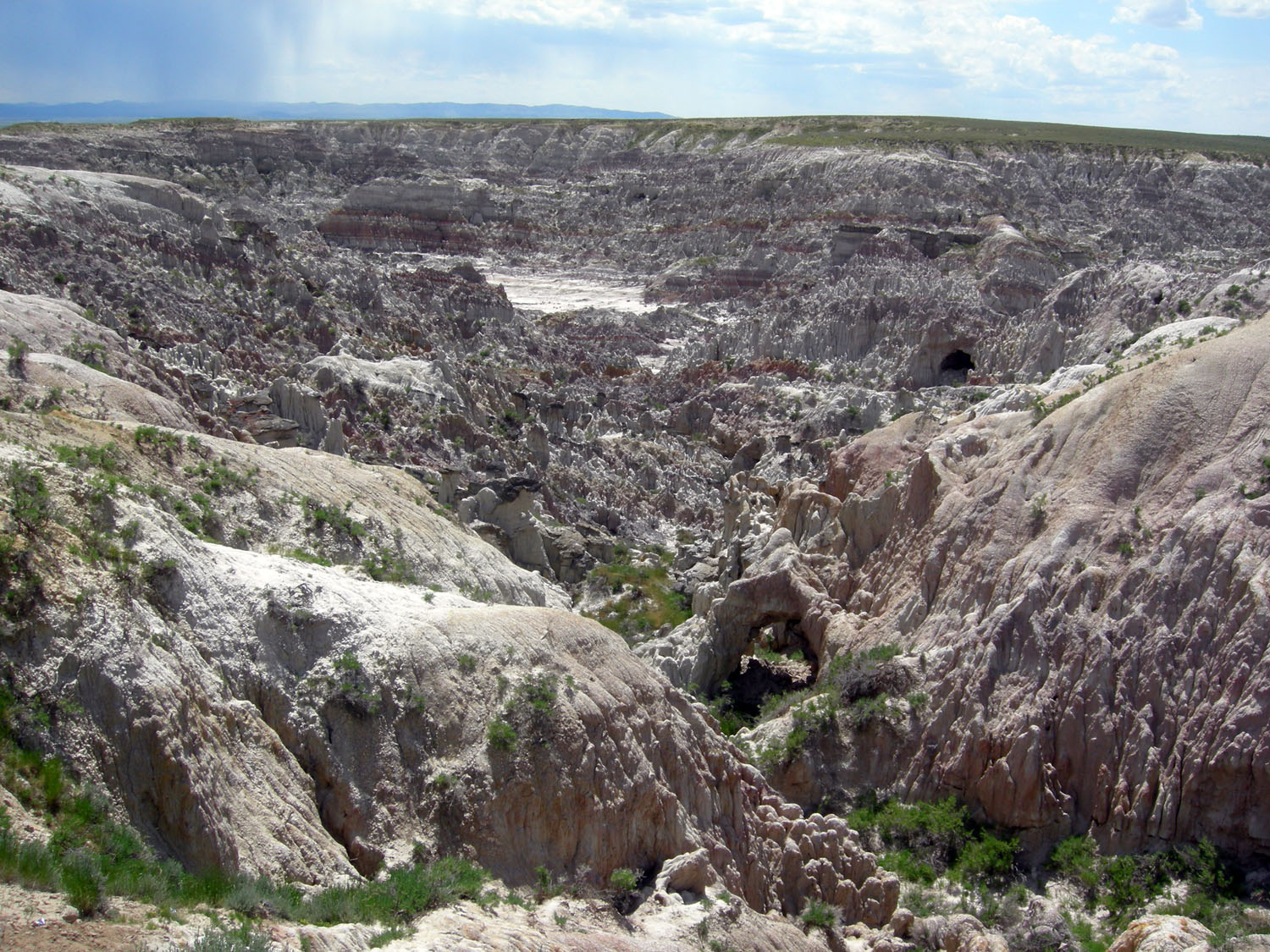
Badlands of Hell's Half Acre, Natrona County, Wyoming, where parts of Starship Troopers were filmed.

Principal photography began on April 29, 1996, with six weeks of filming in Hell's Half Acre. The area featured extreme weather conditions, including hot days, frigid evenings, blizzards, and 80-mile-per-hour (130 km/h) wind storms that affected much of the on-site equipment, requiring replacements to be flown in on a regular basis. It was also temporarily evacuated after torrential rain mixed with bentonite in the soil, creating a slick surface. The crew returned two weeks later to find that miles of electrical cables, some equipment, and even cars had sunk into the mud. Only a few days of filming were lost, however, as a local warehouse had been converted into a soundstage. The conditions also caused respiratory and exhaustion issues among the crew, and many were treated for heat stroke after wearing heavy costumes in the 115 °F (46 °C) heat, including Busey. Production was paused for a week while he recovered, costing $1.5 million a day. A Klendathu night battle sequence filmed there featured about 1,300 background trooper extras for each night of filming.

A steadicam was used for most filming, with occasional handheld footage for battle scenes, inspired by the 1944 Normandy landings, to make the audience feel like a part of the scene. Most effects scenes were shot early in the schedule so there was sufficient time for the effects team to complete their work. The cast struggled with scenes in which they had to interact with blank space that would later be filled with CGI creations. Cardboard cutouts, tennis balls, flags, and even Verhoeven wielding a broom were methods used to indicate where the creatures would be. (Note: Attributed to multiple references:)

In May, during the Memorial Day holiday weekend, an oncoming driver struck a car carrying crew, resulting in the deaths of two crew members, their driver, and severely injuring television personality Rachel Campos, the girlfriend of one of the dead crew members. Counselling was offered for the remaining cast and crew, who provided donations towards Campos's recovery. Filming moved to Barry Barber Ranch on June 14, for scenes set on Klendathu and Tango Urilla, (Note: Attributed to multiple references:) before returning to Casper on June 26. The post Tango Urilla battle celebration was filmed at Vasquez Rocks.

On the crew's flight to Los Angeles on June 29, an intoxicated crew member mentioned a bomb, resulting in the plane being evacuated, cargo searched, and all passengers being detained. The crew member was arrested while the remaining team waited another day for a flight, losing a rest day and a day of filming. Filming on sets began in early July, including the Buenos Aires education center classroom, biology lab, and Jenkins's basement sets, which were built at Sony Studios. The Jump Ball scene was filmed at the Long Beach Pyramid arena. Van Dien, Meyer, and Muldoon performed many of their own stunts for the scene, apart from flips and somersaults, and encouraged each other to be physically rough. The exam results scene and the prom were both filmed at Kaiser Permanente Medical Center in Baldwin Park. The Federal Recruitment Center scene and following segment in which Carmen leaves by train were filmed over four days at the Los Angeles Convention Center, which Verhoeven chose because he considered its architecture to be futuristic and clean. Some scenes were also filmed at the Park Plaza Hotel.

Camp Currie boot camp scenes were filmed at Mile Square Regional Park in Fountain Valley, which Cameron favored for its abandoned World War II blimp runway onto which they installed a top coat of tarmac and paint for a parade ground. It also fit their image of a low-pollution Earth, being surrounded by flat ground and trees. The co-ed nude shower scene was filmed on a set at Sony Pictures with about fifteen cast members. The set was cleared of all but the cast, Verhoeven, and Vacano, who also undressed at the cast's request. A separate nude scene was written for Richards, but she refused to take part, as she did not see the purpose.

Armstrong's second unit filmed action sequences as well as the complex stunts and special effect scenes that would be time-consuming for the main unit. He delegated much of the main unit stunt work to Dickey Beer to avoid overworking himself. The fight between Rico and Zander was mainly performed by Van Dien and Muldoon while wearing padding suits. Van Dien was injured during a stunt that involved him riding on the back of a gigantic moving fiberglass "Tanker Bug" shell. The movement kept slamming him into the shell as he was held in place with ropes, chipping one of his teeth and bruising his ribs over the three and a half days of filming, but he refused to mention the pain and risk stalling filming. One of the more dangerous stunts came near the end of filming, involving Van Dien, Busey, and Richards running out of an Arachnid tunnel followed by a real explosion. Only one take was done and they were told that, if someone tripped, they should pick them up and keep moving.

Despite the difficult conditions and obstacles, principal photography concluded on October 16, 1996, only slightly over schedule, after six months of filming generally six days a week. Second unit filming concluded a week later on October 23, after filming various explosions and background scenery.

=== Post-production ===
Post-production began in late October 1996, and concluded in August 1997. Starship Troopers was edited by Mark Goldblatt with co-editor Caroline Ross. Goldblatt described Verhoeven as very collaborative, allowing them to interpret his footage in their own way and to provide input during filming on how special effects may be staged. Even so, Goldblatt said Verhoeven was conservative with what he filmed and generally only captured what he wanted with no coverage footage. Some scenes were changed for the release, including trimming the scene of the Brain Bug sucking brains. A separate scene of a soldier being decapitated by an Arachnid was removed preemptively to avoid a restrictive NC-17 release rating. Another scene, of Carmen kissing Rico during the finale, was cut, because test audiences thought it was immoral after Zander's death, and were unconvinced that Carmen could love both men simultaneously. The audiences were also unhappy with Carmen choosing her career over her relationship with Rico and wanted her to die instead of Dizzy.

Additional supplemental scenes were filmed during this period, primarily the FedNet propaganda sequences, as there was no time to complete these during principal photography. Filmed over a week in late January 1997, with many of the same crew, including Verhoeven and Vacano, mainly on location in and around Los Angeles, the FedNet sequences included survivors digging through the remains of Buenos Aires, shot on a vacant lot in downtown Los Angeles that was dressed with broken concrete and flame effects. Another scene of a psychic with a third eye was filmed in a Delta Air Lines hangar at the Los Angeles International Airport. Two rough cut screenings were held for executives on May 29 and 30, 1997, receiving a positive reaction with discussions of a sequel. Starship Troopers is reported to have had a final budget of $100–$110 million. (Note: The 1997 production budget of $100–$110 million is equivalent to $201 million–$221 million in 2025.)

=== Visual effects ===
About half of the budget for Starship Troopers was dedicated to realizing the required 500 visual effect shots. Tippett Studio was mainly responsible for producing effects relating to the Arachnids while Sony Pictures Imageworks (SPI) was tasked with spaceship effects. Davison wanted to use other studios, but it was made clear to him by studio executives that the film would not receive financing without using the in-house studio. Jim Martin and SPI art director Michael Scheffe were mainly responsible for the design of the crafts, with Martin providing broad outlines which were given greater detail and a more consistent appearance by Scheffe. Using SPI would lead to production problems, with their contributions falling months behind schedule and those effects that were completed being deemed insufficient by the filmmakers, resulting in the hiring of Industrial Light & Magic (ILM) and Boss Film Studios to complete the effects work. Many miniatures were made of the ships for different scenes, some of them measuring up to 18 ft (5.5 m) long.

Designing the Arachnids was a collaborative process between Tippett, Hayes, Davison, Neumeier, and Verhoeven. The final designs included the Warrior, Tanker, Plasma, Hopper, and Brain bugs. While CGI was the main method of realizing the creatures, some practical appliances were built by Amalgamated Dynamics, including two full-scale mechanized Warrior bugs capable of lifting an adult in their jaws.

=== Music ===
Basil Poledouris – "Klendathu Drop"
The score for Starship Troopers derived from Basil Poledouris's theme for the Rodger Young spacecraft, later titled "Klendathu Drop"

The score for Starship Troopers was composed by Basil Poledouris over six months. Poledouris intended to score the film as an action movie, but Verhoeven wanted the music to offer a realistic background for the characters' experiences. As a result, Poledouris focused on creating a sense of excitement, passion, and poignancy. Verhoeven chose Poledouris's theme for the Rodger Young spaceship, titled "Klendathu Drop", as the basis for the overall score. Poledouris developed themes for specific characters and relationships, including the one between Rico and Dizzy, whom he considered the "heart" of Starship Troopers, but did not create a theme for the Arachnids as he wanted their distinct noises to contrast with the score. The score was recorded on a Sony Studios recording stage between June and September 1997, with a full orchestra of 97 musicians using acoustic and percussion instruments. Evelyn Oz, a band including Poledouris's daughter, Zoë, performs two songs during the prom scene: an original song, "Into It", and a lyrically modified "I Have Not Been to Oxford Town", composed by David Bowie.

== Release ==
=== Marketing ===
Starship Troopers was initially scheduled for release on July 2, 1997, but was later pushed back to July 25, then September, and finally November 7. These shifts were made to allow more time to complete special effects work and increase public awareness of the film, but it was also thought that Air Force One and Men in Black, which starred popular actors, were more commercially viable options for Sony Pictures. Alan Marshall stated that no one involved in Starship Troopers was happy about delaying an anticipated blockbuster to after the peak theatrical season. The first trailer for Starship Troopers was released on November 22, 1996, appearing before Star Trek: First Contact, with the second playing before Men in Black and Air Force One in 1997.

=== Box office ===
The premiere of Starship Troopers took place on November 4, 1997, in Westwood, Los Angeles, with an afterparty at the Museum of Flying.

In the United States and Canada, the film was released on November 7, 1997. During its opening weekend, the film grossed approximately $22.1 million from 2,971 theaters—an average of $7,424 per theater—making it the top film of the weekend, beating out Bean ($12.7 million) and I Know What You Did Last Summer ($6.5 million), both in their fourth weekend. The New York Times gave 1,000 tickets for Bean to young boys as a test, and recorded that many then snuck into the R-rated Starship Troopers.

In its second weekend, the film dropped to second place, grossing $10 million, ahead of the re-release of The Little Mermaid ($9.8 million) and behind the debut of The Jackal ($15.2 million). This represented a 54% decrease from the previous weekend's box office. In its third weekend, Starship Troopers fell to seventh place with a box office gross of $4.7 million, and left the top 10 highest-grossing films by its sixth weekend in mid-December. The film left most theaters by the end of the year with a total box office gross of about $54.8 million, making it the 33rd highest-grossing film of the year in the U.S. and Canada.

Outside the U.S. and Canada, the film is estimated to have grossed an additional $66.3 million, giving it a worldwide box office of $121 million, and making it the 34th highest-grossing film worldwide that year. (Note: The 1997 theatrical box office gross of $121 million is equivalent to $243 million in 2025.) Verhoeven said that Davison had told him it would "never make its money back. He saw there was a problem with the American audience better than I had."

== Reception ==
=== Critical response ===
Starship Troopers received generally negative reviews and was unpopular with critics and audiences on release. (Note: Attributed to multiple references:) Audience polls by CinemaScore found that moviegoers gave the film an average grade of "C+" on an A+ to F scale.

Many reviewers did not interpret Starship Troopers as a satire and believed that its fascist themes were sincere. (Note: Attributed to multiple references:) An editorial in The Washington Post described the film as pro-fascist, made, directed, and written by Nazis. (Note: Attributed to multiple references:) Stephen Hunter said the film was "spiritually" and "psychologically" Nazi and born of a Nazi-like imagination. Hunter described it as a "perversion" of Erich Maria Remarque's 1929 novel, All Quiet on the Western Front, which portrays the physical and mental tolls of war, by glorifying the horrors of war. Others, such as Adam Smith of Empire, argued that the "constant fetishizing of weaponry" and "[Aryan] cast", combined with the militaristic imagery in RoboCop and Total Recall, made it seem as though Verhoeven admired Heinlein's world more than he claimed. Some critics, such as Roger Ebert and Owen Gleiberman, recognized the satire, but often found that this commentary was indistinguishable from the promotion of the fascist utopia it was satirizing. Salon argued that even with good satire, it is "self-defeatingly stupid" to use it in a story that wants its audience to care about its characters, and that Starship Troopers fails to replace Heinlein's themes with a worthwhile ideal. The Los Angeles Times wrote that Verhoeven had "lost his touch" with satire by failing to respect his audiences' intelligence and make the world of Starship Troopers interesting or convincing.

Kenneth Turan and James Berardinelli considered the film among the most "jaw-dropping" and easily digestible films of that year, compared to several other blockbuster projects which had been disappointing. Berardinelli said that, at its best, Starship Troopers replicated the thrills of Aliens (1986), while emulating television teen drama Beverly Hills, 90210 in its worst moments. Salon's review described Starship Troopers as an unintelligent and "discordant" combination of ultraviolence, poor acting, and special effects. Ebert said that Heinlein's novel was written for juveniles and the film would only be of interest to younger audiences. Janet Maslin and Turan found Neuemeier's script to be unsuccessful in transitioning from the teenage love story to the carnage of war, but that Starship Troopers remained watchable as a live-action comic book. Turan, in particular, said that unlike its contemporaries, such as Independence Day and Twister (both 1996), Starship Troopers benefitted from a lack of pretence that the effects were less important than emotions or "pseudo-sensitivity". Ebert concluded that, apart from the satire, Starship Troopers lacked any humanity or basic entertainment value with which to establish a connection to the audience.

Turan's and Empire's reviews, among others, were dismissive of the central cast, describing them as "no name" models that offered only an all-American superficial Aryan stereotype of beauty. (Note: Attributed to multiple references:) Gleiberman wrote that their limited acting abilities made some of their critically derided peers seem like "classical thespians", which made it difficult to become invested in the core narrative. While Berardinelli concurred with this assessment, he complimented the cast for their efforts, appeal, and enthusiasm in the roles. Verhoeven later said Starship Troopers could have benefitted from casting actors for their ability instead of looks. Some critics, such as Berardinelli, said that Starship Troopers would not work with good "or even competent" actors. Berardinelli also praised the cast for being "appealing and enthusiastic", particularly Van Dien and Meyer for retaining some human interest once the special-effects sequences become more prominent.

Salon's review found the violence consistent with Verhoeven's previous works, with Gleiberman describing it as offering a "kinky-camp ghoulishness". Berardinelli and Maslin praised the tension, scale, and impressive visuals of the action sequences, in which Verhoeven revels in the contrast between his characters' earnestness and the violent and gory imagery. Others, such as Jonathan Rosenbaum and Ebert, wrote that the scenes grew tiresome because the alien creatures had no personality, lacking any culture or discernible language, which rendered them ideologically "boring ciphers" inhabiting uninteresting planets. Despite his praise, Berardinelli said audiences would quickly become desensitized to the extreme gore.

=== Accolades ===
At the 2nd Golden Satellite Awards in 1998, Starship Troopers was nominated for Best Motion Picture (Animated or Mixed Media). For the 70th Academy Awards, Tippett, Scott E. Anderson, Alec Gillis, and John Richardson were nominated for Best Visual Effects. Starship Troopers was also nominated for Best Action Sequence at the MTV Movie Awards, as well as receiving a nomination for Best Dramatic Presentation from the Hugo Awards. The film was nominated for Worst Picture at the Stinkers Bad Movie Awards, losing to Batman & Robin.

== Post-release ==
=== Performance analysis ===
Retrospective analyses have attempted to explain the cause of Starship Troopers's poor performance and reception. (Note: Attributed to multiple references:) The film generally failed to connect with both critics and audiences, who found its mixture of satire, violence, gore, and "cheesy" performances unappealing. (Note: Attributed to multiple references:) Other industry experts believe it was also adversely affected by the quantity of successful science fiction and genre films already released that year, such as The Lost World: Jurassic Park ($618.6 million) and The Fifth Element ($263.9 million). Starship Troopers was also released just before Titanic ($1.8 billion), which dominated theaters, and other anticipated films like Alien Resurrection, Scream 2, and Tomorrow Never Dies. American historian Robert Sklar suggested that audiences had grown tired of alien war films and science fiction adventure in general after the recent releases of Mars Attacks!, the blockbuster Independence Day (both 1996), and the Star Wars special editions (1997).

The film's reputation was also damaged by a report by The Washington Post accusing Starship Troopers of promoting Nazism. Verhoeven said: "We were accused ... of being neo-Nazis! ... They couldn't see that all I have done is ironically create a fascist utopia." This narrative was perpetuated in European news publications despite Verhoeven's efforts to explain the satirical portrayal of fascism. Verhoeven believed this dissuaded audiences from seeing Starship Troopers and, alongside poor word of mouth from audiences that did attend, the U.S. box office gross dropped a then rare 50% in its second weekend. He added that audiences were not happy about Dizzy dying instead of Carmen. The film's title was also seen as a contributing factor, leading audiences to expect a light-hearted adventure like Star Wars (1977). Verhoeven blamed the studio's poor marketing of Starship Troopers in the United States by labelling it as an action film, leading critics and audiences to overlook the satire. A Los Angeles Times editorial speculated the decision was possibly deliberate because satire films did not perform as well as the action genre. Verhoeven anecdotally remarked that it was appropriately marketed as a satire in England.

=== Home media ===
The film score was released on compact disc (CD) by Varèse Sarabande in 1997, but was criticized for a short runtime of 30 minutes. Bootleg copies were made containing additional material using the score from the film's DVD release. Starship Troopers was released on VHS in 1998 and on DVD in 1999. The DVD features a documentary about the making of the film, actor screen tests, commentary by Verhoeven and Neumeier, and deleted scenes including an alternative ending in which Rico and Carmen officially rekindle their romance. In 2002, a two-disc Special Edition DVD was released with additional features, including commentary by Verhoeven, Neumeier, and the cast, breakdowns of the special effects, and documentaries about the making of the film, creating the Arachnids and spaceships, the visual effects, and scene breakdowns.

Starship Troopers was released on Blu-ray in 2008, containing many previously released extras and the addition of FedNet mode, which places a graphic overlay to the film with pop-up facts. A limited edition two-disc CD of the score was released in 2016, containing additional tracks.

A 4K Ultra HD Blu-ray remastered version was released for the film's 20th anniversary with previously released extras. A 25th anniversary 4K Blu-ray was released in 2022, in a limited edition steelbook case, and includes a reunion discussion between Neumeier, Van Dien, Richards, Meyer, Ironside, Brown, Busey, and Gilliam.

=== Other media ===
Coinciding with its theatrical release, Sony had restructured its business to focus on translating its films, including Starship Troopers, into media franchises that would extend their profitability beyond their time in theaters. Starship Troopers merchandise included miniatures, action figures, and "Insect Touch", a three-issue comic book by Dark Horse Comics. Toy manufacturer Galoob developed twelve different products including action figures and vehicles. Retailers were reluctant to stock toys for an R-rated film, with both Wal-Mart and Target, which represented about 20% of all action figure sales, declining, although Toys "R" Us and KB Toys agreed. Sony executives called it an "open secret" that children were attending R-rated films. Author Paul Sammon spent six months accompanying filming for Starship Troopers, through pre-production and leading up to the film's release. His resulting work was released alongside the film as The Making of Starship Troopers. A CGI animated television series, Roughnecks: Starship Troopers Chronicles, was released in 1999. Based on elements of the film and Heinlein's novel, the series ran for forty episodes.

The 1976 board game Starship Troopers was re-released and repackaged alongside the film as Starship Troopers: Prepare for Battle. A Starship Troopers pinball machine was also released in 1997. There have also been several game adaptations based on the film, including Starship Troopers: Terran Ascendancy (2000), Starship Troopers (2005)—which features Van Dien returning to voice Rico—and Starship Troopers: Terran Command (2022).

== Themes and analysis ==
=== Politics and propaganda ===
The iconography used by the human organizations in Starship Troopers was based on the emblem of the German Heer (left) and the logo of the Italian Blackshirts (right).

Starship Troopers explores themes including patriotism, authoritarianism, militarism, colonialism, and xenophobia. (Note: Attributed to multiple references:) Verhoeven interpreted Heinlein's novel as fascistic, nationalistic, totalitarian, and in favor of military rule, something antithetical to the director's own wartime experiences, and used Starship Troopers to deconstruct and undermine these themes. (Note: Attributed to multiple references:) Iconography inspired by the German Nazi regime and Italian National Fascist Party appear throughout Starship Troopers as symbols of the United Citizen Federation (UCF). The UCF flag, bearing an eagle, resembles the Nazi coat of arms; officer uniforms are similar to those worn by the Nazi secret police—the Gestapo—including the insignia, and the symbol on infantry uniforms references Benito Mussolini's Blackshirts. Neumeier said the Nazi uniforms were used, in part, because the Nazi outfits looked good, but Verhoeven also wanted to use that aesthetic in "an artistic way". Although some contemporary critics and audiences considered Starship Troopers to be an endorsement of fascism, Verhoeven said, "whenever you see something that you think is fascist, you should know that the filmmakers agree with your opinion". Other aspects of the Nazi regime influence Starship Troopers, from the architecture of Albert Speer, to propaganda films such as Olympia. The first scene of Starship Troopers, an advertisement for the Mobile Infantry, emulates scenes from Triumph of the Will and references a line of dialogue, "I'm doing my part!" (Note: Attributed to multiple references:)

Influence was also taken from writer Susan Sontag's 1975 essay, "Fascinating Fascism", that identifies key aspects of Nazism, such as the "cult of beauty", "fetishism of courage", "repudiation of the intellect", and serving the community at the expense of the self. Verhoeven cast attractive actors, described by Entertainment Weekly critic Darren Franich as conveying the Aryan ideal of beauty, to "seduce the audience into joining [Starship Troopers's] society ... but then ask, 'What are you really joining up for?'" (Note: Attributed to multiple references:) Screenwriter Mark Rosenthal said that the dangers of exposing the audience to an attractive fascism are necessary to lead them to the possibility of progressive politics. In the novel, Rico is revealed at the end to be Filipino, a deliberate choice to make readers empathise with the character before revealing he is not white. Verhoeven made Rico white to further satirize the fascistic messaging.

Franich and The A.V. Club critic Scott Tobias wrote that the filmmakers portray the main characters as "petty and stupid", but that the film's best joke lies in Rico not being very intelligent but, in turn, becoming the ideal citizen and perfect tool for war, abandoning any personal hopes and dreams outside military life. Professor Lene Hansen challenged Verhoeven's assertion that Starship Troopers portrays a feminist fascism in which men and women are treated entirely equally. Focusing on Dizzy, Hansen wrote that while the character is portrayed as equal to and even superior to male characters as an athlete and soldier, seemingly in service to the greater collective, her dying words imply her actions are motivated by her feelings for Rico and her sacrifice is therefore romantic, conflicting with the film's fascist ideals of collective responsibility and heroic masculinity. Hansen concluded that Starship Troopers ultimately reinforces classical fascist gender norms, in which men are central to the narrative and women are secondary or serve a supporting role.

The propaganda depicted on the "FedNet" uses extreme examples to satirize the UCF, such as children holding weapons or stamping on cockroaches while an adult looks on happily, as well as slogans such as "Join the Mobile Infantry and save the world" and "Service guarantees citizenship". Writer Darren Mooney considered the FedNet to be prescient of the increasing prominence of fake news, presenting stories that those in positions of power want the populace to see, emphasizing patriotism and duty, while offering an illusion of choice and enlightenment by asking: "Would you like to know more?" Verhoeven said the query raises the question: "Do you want this type of society? Do you want to dive even further into this system that already exists in America?" The youth are indoctrinated through these slogans and propaganda, and information relating to the Arachnids is intended to provoke a xenophobic response, both convincing the protagonists that their cause is righteous and presenting the Arachnids as inferior. The A.V. Club wrote that Starship Troopers presents a society that has been convinced to trade its freedoms, rights, and identities for security.

Starship Troopers is also Verhoeven's response to events he perceived in contemporary American politics, such as limited gun restrictions and an increase of capital punishment, which he believed could eventually result in open fascism, as well as films that glorified the U.S. military and depicted a casual attitude to violence. (Note: Attributed to multiple references:) Franich found similarities between Starship Troopers and the action film Top Gun (1986), which follows physically strong, young, and attractive United States Navy pilots combating a vague enemy. Several action films from the 1990s, such as Independence Day (1996) and Air Force One (1997), offered similarly jingoistic pro-American and pro-military messages.

=== Citizenship and violence ===
In the militaristic society depicted in Starship Troopers, many rights are reserved only for citizens, those who have volunteered for and completed military service. Voting is presented as an act of force and supreme authority, a right that must be earned instead of given. Rasczak tells his students: "Violence has resolved more conflicts than anything else. The contrary opinion that violence doesn't solve anything is merely wishful thinking at worst." The boot camp shower scene involves several characters discussing their reason for enlistment, such as being able to run for elected office, have children, receive a scholarship, or just not having to work on a farm. Verhoeven said that the purpose of the scene—one of Starship Troopers's most infamous—is that since all of the characters are fascists, they have no libido and do not react to each other's exposure, instead only discussing their careers and combat. The nudity was criticized, but Verhoeven believed it was hypocritical to focus on sexual scenes while allowing the depiction of extreme violence. The film professor Florentine Strzelczyk opined that the infantry's sexual energy is redirected into an "orgasmic" violent display of fluids, guts, and gore. The author Leighton Grist wrote that citizenship being a requirement for most procreation is similar to fascist policies of eugenics.

Although humanity is mainly presented as victims of the Arachnid threat, aspects of Starship Troopers imply that humanity may have instigated the conflict by colonizing Arachnid worlds, and that the creatures are merely defending themselves. In her analysis, Strzelczyk identified critical commentary of the war provided by a journalist who queries whether the Arachnids would be hostile if they were left in peace. However, when the journalist is killed by an Arachnid in a bloody display, his critique is visually erased and his reconciliatory opinion invalidated.

Starship Troopers presents a cycle of war, in which Earth's youths are emboldened by propaganda to become readily disposable infantry. These soldiers' orders are to kill anything inhuman and strategic failures are merely solved by deploying more soldiers. The writer Lloyd Farley considered the gory and explicit scenes depicting the dead as being intended to overtly display the "horrors of war" in a society solely dedicated to conflict. Previous military defeats and the revelation that their own superiors view them as expendable are quickly forgotten as the infantry troops celebrate their victory and capture of the Brain Bug, with the promise this will lead to the end of the war, but no actual conclusion is offered. The Brain Bug suggests the Arachnids are not significantly different to and are justified in exterminating humanity to preserve their own race. This violence is reinforced with rewards, such as Rico's repeated promotions, but these openings often arise because his predecessors were killed. Starship Troopers culminates with the surviving protagonists not disagreeing with this system or choosing to fight against it, but becoming a part of it by appearing in recruitment propaganda to enlist the next generation of troops.

== Legacy ==
=== Critical reassessment ===
In a 2013 retrospective by The Atlantic, critic Calum Marsh said that while Starship Troopers's critical reputation had not improved significantly since its release, it was gradually shifting in a positive direction, with some critics and writers considering it an "unsung masterpiece". Other retrospective analyses, from the early 2000s to the 2020s, described it as among the most subversive and misunderstood Hollywood studio films ever made, undermined by critics and audiences who misinterpreted the anti-fascist satire as an endorsement. (Note: Attributed to multiple references:) The Atlantic and The Verge in 2020, described it as an obvious satire, in hindsight, that was released at the wrong time, amid an era of prosperity in the United States during the late 1990s when American audiences may not have seen, or wanted to see, the criticisms of their own society. The marketing was also blamed, which presented Starship Troopers as a typical science fiction action film, making it easy for audiences not expecting satire to misinterpret it. Other publications argued that Starship Troopers was an example of Poe's law, where views are presented to such an extreme that it becomes impossible for audiences to understand if it is parody or serious. A 2024 analysis by Vice described the modern discourse as divided between those who praise Starship Troopers's satire, and those who believe that, despite the satire, the film ultimately glorifies the "Aryan characters, their militarized society, and their fight against the supposedly inhuman bugs."

Opinions on the film changed alongside societal shifts, making the satire more obvious, particularly in the 2010s as its critiques of right-wing militarism, the military–industrial complex, reactionary violence, and American jingoism made it seem ahead of its time. In a 2020 retrospective for The New Yorker, David Roth argued that Starship Troopers's message had become more meaningful because it presents a narrative in which humanity, built on a culture of fascism and violence, "gets its ass kicked", and its only solution is to inflict more violence, to little success. Roth further contrasted the culture of violence to contemporary police brutality against peaceful protests or government attempts to defeat the COVID-19 pandemic through sheer will.

Starship Troopers is now considered a cult classic. (Note: Attributed to multiple references:) Some publications have listed it among the best science fiction films ever made, (Note: Attributed to multiple references:) and as one of the best films of the 1990s. (Note: Attributed to multiple references:) In 2021, the British Film Institute (BFI) named it one of the ten greatest science fiction adaptations. Review aggregator Rotten Tomatoes offers a 72% approval rating from the aggregated reviews of 82 critics, with an average score of 6.5/10. The website's critical consensus reads, "A fun movie...if you can accept the excessive gore and wooden acting." The film has a score of 51 out of 100 on Metacritic based on 20 critics' reviews, indicating "mixed or average reviews".

=== Cultural influence ===
Starship Troopers has continued to generate interest in the decades since its release because of elements which came to reflect future events, such as the September 11, 2001, terrorist attacks, and the subsequent actions of the U.S. government and president George W. Bush to convince the American people to surrender certain liberties to enable the subsequent war on terror and defeat their enemies. Retrospectives in the late 2010s and early 2020s have described how a contemporary rise in fascist activity in the U.S. had made Starship Troopers seem prescient and more of a warning than satire. The A.V. Club described Starship Troopers as a "brilliant dissection" of wars and how propaganda is used to justify young people being sent to their deaths against a dehumanized enemy. A 2020 retrospective by The Guardian suggested that, with hindsight, Starship Troopers formed the final installment of Verhoeven's unofficial science fiction action film trilogy about authoritarian governance, preceded by RoboCop (1987) and Total Recall (1990). Empire called it the true spiritual successor to RoboCop's "savage satire" and "gonzo violence", unlike that film's own sequels.

Verhoeven followed Starship Troopers with the 2000 science fiction horror Hollow Man, a film that he believed lacked his own personal style as he acquiesced to studio demands. Disillusioned with the Hollywood studio system, and compounded by the failures of Showgirls and Starship Troopers, Verhoeven returned to Europe to work outside of the Hollywood studio system, going on to earn acclaim for his subsequent works, such as Black Book (2006) and Elle (2016). In 2015, Van Dien remarked: "There has not been a week in my life since I did [Starship Troopers] where I can go down the street without someone going 'Rico!'" Richards has said she loved her character and how people responded to her as a strong female character.

Several filmmakers and some actors have named it as an influence or among their favorite films, including Ari Aster, Margaret Brown, Macaulay Culkin, Takashi Miike, David Lowery, Robert Rodriguez, Eli Roth, Riley Stearns, Quentin Tarantino, James Wan, and Edgar Wright. Slogans used in the film, such as "I'm doing my part!" and "Would you like to know more?", have become part of the cultural lexicon. The film's influence can also be seen in other media, such as the animated Futurama ("War Is the H-Word", 2000), the anime Kaguya-sama: Love Is War (2019–2022), and the video game Helldivers 2 (2024). The popularity of Helldivers 2 led to a resurgence of interest in Starship Troopers.

== Sequels and remake ==
Verhoeven had never developed a sequel to his films, but he was interested in directing a second Starship Troopers installment. The relative failure of Starship Troopers derailed plans for a theatrical sequel and Verhoeven moved on to other projects. Starship Troopers was followed by two low-budget, direct-to-home media sequels. The first, Starship Troopers 2: Hero of the Federation (2004), was directed by Tippett from a script by Neumeier and followed new characters. Neumeier wrote and directed the second sequel, Starship Troopers 3: Marauder (2008), for which Van Dien reprised his role as Rico. The series narrative was continued in two CGI animated films: Starship Troopers: Invasion (2012) sees the return of Rico, Jenkins, and Ibanez (with different voice actors), while Starship Troopers: Traitor of Mars (2017) was written by Neumeier and features voice acting by Van Dien and Meyer.

In the early 2010s, it was reported that the film series could be rebooted to more closely align with Heinlein's novel; there have been no updates since 2016. Verhoeven was unhappy with the concept. In 2021, Van Dien said a television adaptation was being considered by Sony Pictures Television, although talks had stalled because of the COVID-19 pandemic.

A remake was confirmed in March 2025 that will be written and directed by Neill Blomkamp.
