= Natrona, Wyoming =

Unincorporated community in Natrona County, Wyoming, United States

- Unincorporated community
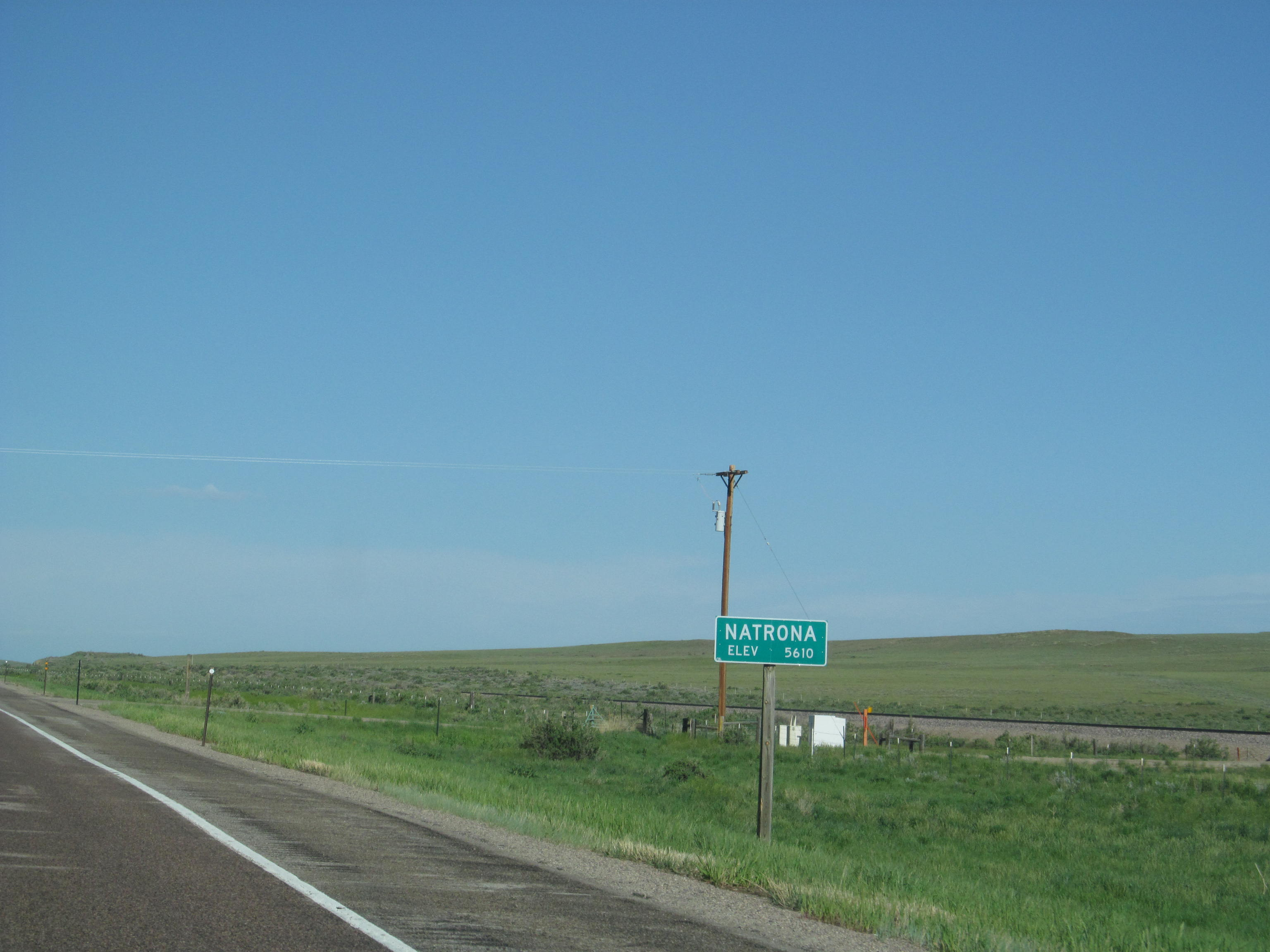
- Westbound on US 20 / US 26 enting Natrona, June 2014

- Location within the state of Wyoming Natrona (the United States)
- Coordinates: 43°01′47″N 106°48′33″W
- Country: United States
- State: Wyoming
- County: Natrona
- Elevation: 5,604 ft (1,708 m)
- Time zone: UTC-7 (Mountain (MST))
  - Summer (DST): UTC-6 (MDT)
- ZIP codes: 82646
- GNIS feature ID: 1597426

Natrona is an unincorporated community in central Natrona County, Wyoming, United States. It lies along the concurrent U.S. Routes 20 and 26, west of the city of Casper, the county seat of Natrona County. Its elevation is 5,604 feet (1,708 m). Although Natrona is unincorporated, it has been assigned its own ZIP code of 82646.

== History ==
Natrona contained a post office from 1906 until 1984. The community was named from its location in Natrona County.
