= Natrona County, Wyoming =

County in Wyoming, United States

- County
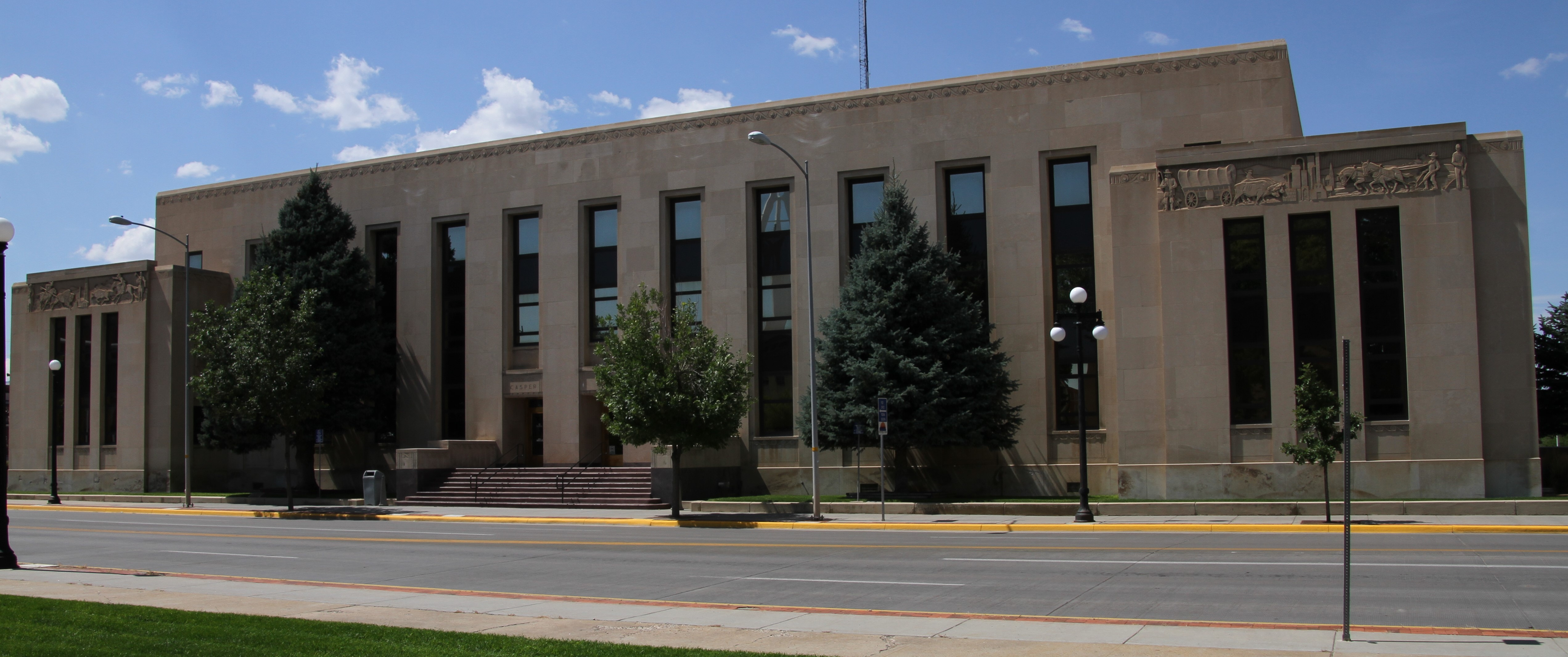
- Natrona County Courthouse in Casper

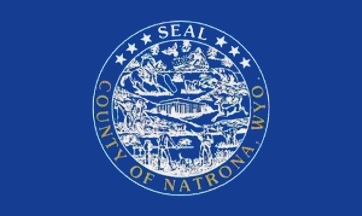
- Flag

- Location within the U.S. state of Wyoming
- Coordinates: 42°58′N 106°48′W
- Country: United States
- State: Wyoming
- Named for: Natron deposits
- Seat: Casper
- Largest city: Casper

Area
  - Total: 5,376 sq mi (13,920 km^{2})
  - Land: 5,340 sq mi (13,800 km^{2})
  - Water: 35 sq mi (91 km^{2}) 0.7%

Population (2020)
  - Total: 79,955
  - Estimate (2025): 80,526 ▲
  - Density: 15.0/sq mi (5.78/km^{2})
- Time zone: UTC−7 (Mountain)
  - Summer (DST): UTC−6 (MDT)
- Congressional district: At-large
- Website: www.natronacounty-wy.gov

Natrona County is a county in the U.S. state of Wyoming. As of the 2020 United States census, the population was 79,955, making it the second-most populous county in Wyoming. Its county seat is Casper. Natrona County comprises the Casper metropolitan area. In 2010, the center of population of Wyoming was in Natrona County, near Alcova.

== History ==
Prior to Wyoming's settlement by European-based populations, the area's stretches played host to nomadic tribes such as Cheyenne, Arapaho, Shoshone, and Sioux.

New York investor John Jacob Astor established the settlement of Astoria on the Columbia River, and sent Robert Stuart eastward to blaze a trail and lay the foundation of a string of trading posts. Stuart documented the South Pass Route through the Continental Divide, near the SW corner of present-day Natrona County. Stuart's company erected the first hut in the area in 1812, near present-day Bessemer Bend.

In 1840, Father Pierre-Jean De Smet began preaching the Christian teaching to this area's indigenous peoples. He carved his name on Independence Rock and called it The Register of the Desert. Later explorers who inscribed the rock include John C. Frémont (1843), who explored the country along the Platte and Sweetwater Rivers.

The first Euro-American settlement occurred in the Casper area in the late 19th century. Natrona County was created by the legislature of the Wyoming Territory on March 9, 1888, and it was organized in 1890. The land for Natrona County was annexed from Carbon County.

Natrona County was named for the deposits of natron found in the area. According to George Mitchell, first mayor of Casper and member of the organization commission for Natrona County, the name was first suggested "by my old friend the late Cy Iba, who at one time owned the soda lakes." In 1909, Natrona County gained land from Fremont County. The boundaries were adjusted slightly in 1911 and 1931, and at that point the county gained its present outline.

== Geography ==
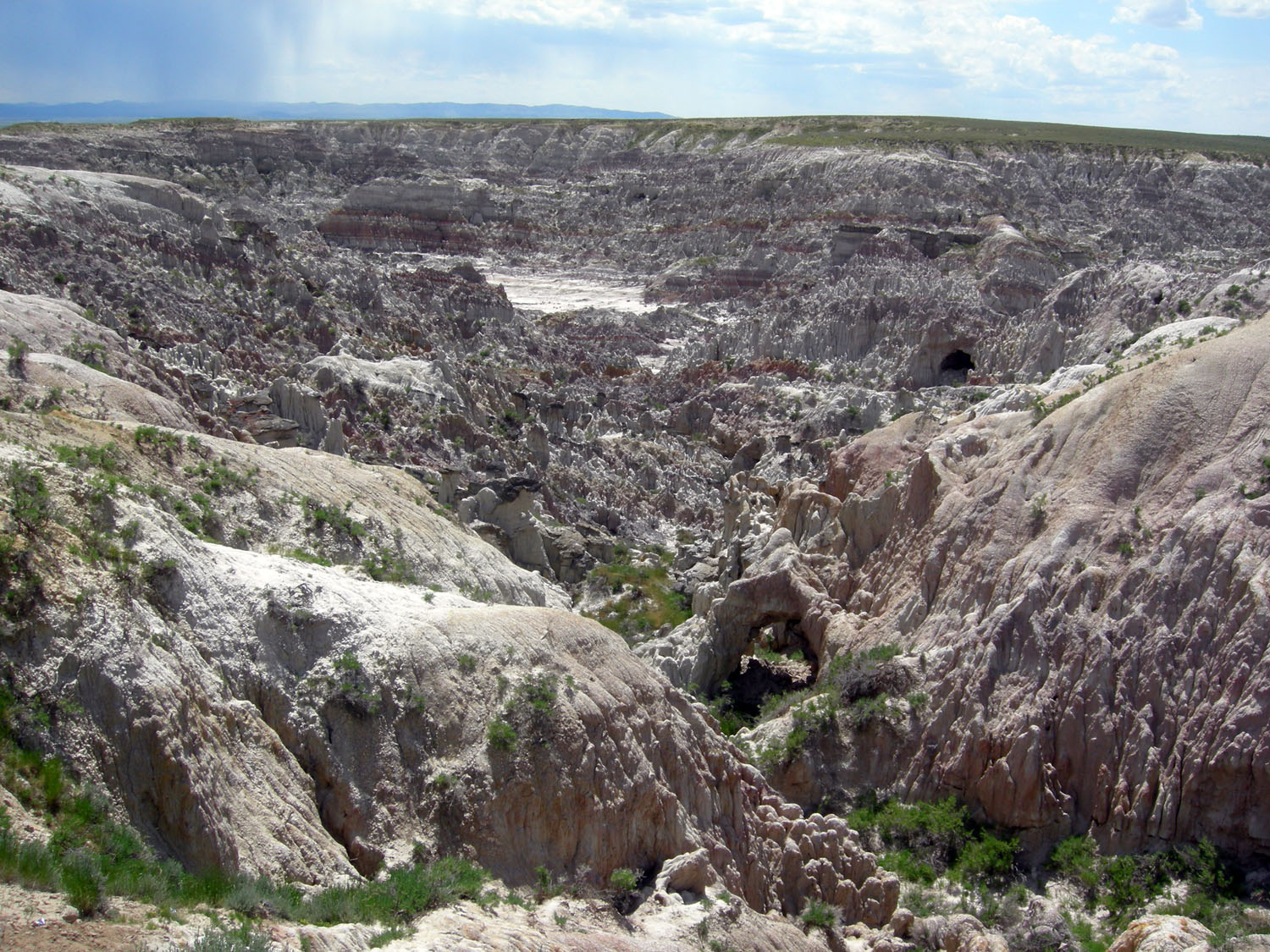
Badlands of Hell's Half-Acre, Natrona County

According to the U.S. Census Bureau, the county has an area of 5,376 square miles (13,920 km^{2}), of which 5,340 square miles (13,800 km^{2}) is land and 35 square miles (91 km^{2}) (0.7%) is water.

=== Geographic features ===
- Casper Mountain
- Devil's Gate
- Hell's Half Acre
- Independence Rock
- Martin's Cove
- Teapot Rock

=== Adjacent counties ===
- Johnson County – north
- Converse County – east
- Albany County – southeast
- Carbon County – south
- Fremont County – west
- Washakie County – northwest

=== Major highways ===
- Interstate 25
- I-25 BL
- U.S. Highway 20
- U.S. Highway 26
- U.S. Highway 87
- U.S. Highway 287
- Wyoming Highway 220
- Wyoming Highway 251
- Wyoming Highway 252
- Wyoming Highway 253
- Wyoming Highway 256
- Wyoming Highway 257
- Wyoming Highway 258
- Wyoming Highway 259
- Wyoming Highway 387
- Wyoming Highway 487

=== Transit ===
- Casper Area Transit
- Express Arrow

== Geology ==
Natrona County derives its name from the vast deposits of the mineral Natron found within the county. Of the 18 million tons of Natron consumed by American industry annually 17 Million tons is mined in Wyoming due to its purity.

=== National protected areas ===
- Medicine Bow National Forest (part)
- Pathfinder National Wildlife Refuge (part)

== Demographics ==
Historical population
Census	Pop.	Note	%±
1890	1,094		—
1900	1,785		63.2%
1910	4,766		167.0%
1920	14,635		207.1%
1930	24,272		65.8%
1940	23,858		−1.7%
1950	31,437		31.8%
1960	49,623		57.8%
1970	51,264		3.3%
1980	71,856		40.2%
1990	61,226		−14.8%
2000	66,533		8.7%
2010	75,450		13.4%
2020	79,955		6.0%
2025 (est.)	80,526	▲	0.7%
US Decennial Census; 1870–2000 2010–2020

=== 2020 census ===
As of the 2020 census, the county had a population of 79,955. Of the residents, 24.4% were under the age of 18 and 15.9% were 65 years of age or older; the median age was 37.6 years. For every 100 females there were 100.8 males, and for every 100 females age 18 and over there were 98.8 males.

Natrona County, Wyoming – Racial and ethnic composition Note: the US Census treats Hispanic/Latino as an ethnic category. This table excludes Latinos from the racial categories and assigns them to a separate category. Hispanics/Latinos may be of any race.
Race / Ethnicity (NH = Non-Hispanic)	Pop 2000	Pop 2010	Pop 2020	% 2000	% 2010	% 2020
White alone (NH)	61,023	67,191	66,614	91.72%	89.05%	83.31%
Black or African American alone (NH)	473	621	729	0.71%	0.82%	0.91%
Native American or Alaska Native alone (NH)	575	612	767	0.86%	0.81%	0.96%
Asian alone (NH)	269	479	633	0.40%	0.63%	0.79%
Pacific Islander alone (NH)	20	35	78	0.03%	0.05%	0.10%
Other race alone (NH)	73	64	306	0.11%	0.08%	0.38%
Mixed race or Multiracial (NH)	843	1,217	3,659	1.27%	1.61%	4.58%
Hispanic or Latino (any race)	3,257	5,231	7,169	4.90%	6.93%	8.97%
Total	66,533	75,450	79,955	100.00%	100.00%	100.00%

The racial makeup of the county was 86.7% White, 1.0% Black or African American, 1.3% American Indian and Alaska Native, 0.8% Asian, 2.6% from some other race, and 7.5% from two or more races. Hispanic or Latino residents of any race comprised 9.0% of the population.

There were 32,699 households in the county, of which 30.4% had children under the age of 18 living with them and 24.4% had a female householder with no spouse or partner present. About 30.3% of all households were made up of individuals and 11.6% had someone living alone who was 65 years of age or older.

There were 36,808 housing units, of which 11.2% were vacant. Among occupied housing units, 68.9% were owner-occupied and 31.1% were renter-occupied. The homeowner vacancy rate was 1.7% and the rental vacancy rate was 13.2%.

=== 2010 census ===
As of the 2010 United States census, there were 75,450 people, 30,616 households, and 19,714 families in the county. The population density was 14.1 people per square mile (5.4 people/km^{2}). There were 33,807 housing units at an average density of 6.3 units per square mile (2.4 units/km^{2}). The racial makeup of the county was 92.8% white, 1.0% American Indian, 0.9% black or African American, 0.7% Asian, 0.1% Pacific islander, 2.2% from other races, and 2.4% from two or more races. Those of Hispanic or Latino origin made up 6.9% of the population. In terms of ancestry, 27.2% were German, 15.2% were Irish, 13.2% were English, and 10.7% were American.

Of the 30,616 households, 31.9% had children under the age of 18 living with them, 48.1% were married couples living together, 10.9% had a female householder with no husband present, 35.6% were non-families, and 28.5% of all households were made up of individuals. The average household size was 2.41 and the average family size was 2.94. The median age was 36.8 years.

The median income for a household in the county was $50,936 and the median income for a family was $62,859. Males had a median income of $47,610 versus $30,664 for females. The per capita income for the county was $28,235. About 5.4% of families and 8.4% of the population were below the poverty line, including 9.9% of those under age 18 and 8.8% of those age 65 or over.

=== 2000 census ===
As of the 2000 United States census, of 2000, there were 66,533 persons, 26,819 households, and 17,754 families in the county. The population density was 12 people per square mile (4.6 people/km^{2}). There were 29,882 housing units at an average density of 6 units per square mile (2.3 units/km^{2}). The racial makeup of the county was 94.15% White, 0.76% Black or African American, 1.03% Native American, 0.42% Asian, 0.04% Pacific Islander, 1.92% from other races, and 1.68% from two or more races. 4.90% of the population were Hispanic or Latino of any race. 24.6% were of German, 11.6% English, 11.3% American and 11.2% Irish ancestry.

There were 26,819 households, out of which 32.20% had children under the age of 18 living with them, 51.40% were married couples living together, 10.60% had a female householder with no husband present, and 33.80% were non-families. 27.50% of all households were made up of individuals, and 9.40% had someone living alone who was 65 years of age or older. The average household size was 2.42 and the average family size was 2.95.

The county population contained 26.00% under the age of 18, 10.10% from 18 to 24, 27.90% from 25 to 44, 23.30% from 45 to 64, and 12.70% who were 65 years of age or older. The median age was 36 years. For every 100 females there were 97.70 males. For every 100 females age 18 and over, there were 95.00 males.

The median income for a household in the county was $36,619, and the median income for a family was $45,575. Males had a median income of $33,524 versus $21,374 for females. The per capita income for the county was $18,913. About 8.70% of families and 11.80% of the population were below the poverty line, including 16.20% of those under age 18 and 7.20% of those age 65 or over.

== Communities ==
=== Cities ===
- Casper (county seat and largest municipality)

=== Towns ===
- Bar Nunn
- Edgerton
- Evansville
- Midwest
- Mills

=== Unincorporated areas ===
==== Census-designated places ====
- Alcova
- Antelope Hills
- Bessemer Bend
- Brookhurst
- Casper Mountain
- Hartrandt
- Homa Hills
- Meadow Acres
- Mountain View
- Powder River
- Red Butte
- Vista West

==== Other communities ====
- Arminto
- Bucknum
- Crimson Dawn
- Goose Egg
- Hells Half Acre
- Hiland
- Natrona
- Strouds

== Politics ==
Like almost all of Wyoming, Natrona County is heavily Republican. It is rather conservative for an urban county, having gone Republican in all but three elections since 1944. No Democratic presidential candidate has won forty percent of the county's vote since Lyndon B. Johnson garnered 52 percent in his 1964 landslide against Barry Goldwater. Bill Clinton did win a 100-vote plurality in the 1992 election due to a significant third-party vote. In 2024, Donald Trump received 72.7% of the vote, the county's highest vote percentage for any presidential candidate since Wyoming statehood in 1890.

United States presidential election results for Natrona County, Wyoming
Year	Republican		Democratic		Third party(ies)	
Year	No.	%	No.	%	No.	%
1892	194	55.91%	0	0.00%	153	44.09%
1896	392	54.29%	327	45.29%	3	0.42%
1900	520	66.07%	267	33.93%	0	0.00%
1904	738	69.30%	320	30.05%	7	0.66%
1908	835	63.74%	461	35.19%	14	1.07%
1912	640	45.52%	447	31.79%	319	22.69%
1916	912	39.19%	1,377	59.17%	38	1.63%
1920	2,957	66.20%	1,153	25.81%	357	7.99%
1924	8,267	60.10%	1,631	11.86%	3,857	28.04%
1928	7,141	64.78%	3,818	34.64%	64	0.58%
1932	4,368	37.87%	6,777	58.76%	388	3.36%
1936	3,810	32.00%	7,819	65.67%	278	2.33%
1940	5,555	46.49%	6,373	53.34%	21	0.18%
1944	5,196	51.52%	4,890	48.48%	0	0.00%
1948	5,341	46.01%	6,183	53.26%	84	0.72%
1952	10,663	63.87%	6,021	36.06%	11	0.07%
1956	10,796	62.56%	6,462	37.44%	0	0.00%
1960	11,809	56.74%	9,002	43.26%	0	0.00%
1964	10,135	47.58%	11,167	52.42%	0	0.00%
1968	10,679	57.19%	5,900	31.59%	2,095	11.22%
1972	15,649	70.49%	6,514	29.34%	37	0.17%
1976	13,761	60.83%	8,640	38.19%	220	0.97%
1980	16,801	62.99%	7,111	26.66%	2,760	10.35%
1984	18,488	69.86%	7,598	28.71%	378	1.43%
1988	14,005	59.63%	9,148	38.95%	334	1.42%
1992	9,717	35.46%	9,817	35.83%	7,866	28.71%
1996	13,182	46.72%	11,240	39.84%	3,793	13.44%
2000	18,439	64.95%	8,646	30.46%	1,303	4.59%
2004	21,512	67.08%	9,863	30.76%	693	2.16%
2008	21,906	65.85%	10,475	31.49%	886	2.66%
2012	22,132	68.37%	8,961	27.68%	1,280	3.95%
2016	23,552	70.62%	6,577	19.72%	3,219	9.65%
2020	25,271	71.79%	8,530	24.23%	1,401	3.98%
2024	24,671	72.73%	8,337	24.58%	913	2.69%

Natrona County is governed by a commission, based in the county seat of Casper. The five-member board consists of commissioners, elected to staggered four-year terms. Current commissioners are:

- Forrest Chadwick (chairman) – Republican
- John Lawson (Vice-chairman) – Republican
- Matt Keating – Republican
- Rob Hendry – Republican
- Steve Schlager – Republican

== Education ==
Natrona County School District Number 1 is the school district for the entire county.

== See also ==
- National Register of Historic Places listings in Natrona County, Wyoming
- Wyoming
  - List of cities and towns in Wyoming
  - List of counties in Wyoming
  - Wyoming statistical areas
