= National Register of Historic Places listings in Natrona County, Wyoming =

Location of Natrona County in Wyoming

This is a list of the National Register of Historic Places listings in Natrona County, Wyoming.

It is intended to be a complete list of the properties and districts on the National Register of Historic Places in Natrona County, Wyoming, United States. The locations of National Register properties and districts for which the latitude and longitude coordinates are included below may be seen in a map.

There are 42 properties and districts listed on the National Register in the county, two of which are National Historic Landmarks.

This National Park Service list is complete through NPS recent listings posted August 21, 2026.

Contents: Counties in Wyoming
Albany - Big Horn - Campbell - Carbon - Converse - Crook - Fremont - Goshen - Hot Springs - Johnson - Laramie - Lincoln - Natrona - Niobrara - Park - Platte - Sheridan - Sublette - Sweetwater - Teton - Uinta - Washakie - Weston

== Current listings ==
	Name on the Register	Image	Date listed	Location	City or town	Description
1	Alcova Redoubt	Alcova Redoubt	June 7, 2021 (#100006603)	Address restricted	Alcova	Fortified butte-top with walls and stockpiled stone projectiles, occupied intermittently from the late Prehistoric to the early Protohistoric period.
2	Archeological Site No. 48NA83	Archeological Site No. 48NA83	May 13, 1994 (#94000440)	Address restricted	Arminto vicinity	Unusually rich site from multiple periods of precontact indigenous use, with tipi rings, stone alignments, and burned organic and lithic debris.
3	Big Horn Hotel		December 18, 1978 (#78002831)	Main Street; 43°10′42″N 107°15′24″W	Arminto	Hotel built in Wolton, Wyoming, in 1906 and moved to Arminto in 1913, serving as the social, economic, and voting hub of both railhead communities. Destroyed by fire in 1985.
4	Bishop House	Bishop House	March 12, 2001 (#01000270)	818 East Second Street; 42°50′56″N 106°18′53″W	Casper	Large, upper-class residence built in 1907, attesting to the wealth from the livestock and oil industries in the first half of the 20th century that forged Casper into a regional economic center. Now a historic house museum.
5	Bridger Immigrant Road-Waltman Crossing	Bridger Immigrant Road-Waltman Crossing	January 17, 1975 (#75001905)	49 miles west of Casper on U.S. Route 20; 43°04′30″N 107°14′42″W	Casper vicinity	Trace fragment of a wagon route blazed by Jim Bridger in 1864 for gold rush miners to reach Montana; an alternative to the more direct but riskier Bozeman Trail.
6	Casper Army Air Base	Casper Army Air Base	August 3, 2001 (#01000789)	8500 Fuller Street; 42°53′56″N 106°27′15″W	Casper	The best surviving reminder of the military presence in Wyoming during World War II—a United States Army Air Forces base established in 1942, with 92 contributing properties including a servicemen's clubhouse with interior murals painted by station personnel. Now part of the Casper–Natrona County International Airport.
7	Casper Buffalo Trap	Casper Buffalo Trap	June 25, 1974 (#74002027)	Address restricted	Casper	Parabolic dune where Paleo-Indians hunted a large, now-extinct bison species 10,000–8,000 years ago.
8	Casper Downtown Historic District	Casper Downtown Historic District	October 17, 2016 (#16000732)	Generally bounded by Midwest Avenue, West B and C, & Beech Streets; 42°51′00″N 106°19′26″W	Casper	Long-serving commercial and civic district charting Casper's growth as county seat, railroad and industry hub, and regional center, with 73 contributing properties built circa-1896 to 1970.
9	Casper Federal Building	Casper Federal Building	December 21, 1998 (#98001536)	111 South Wolcott Street; 42°50′59″N 106°19′24″W	Casper	Exemplary 1932 specimen of the nation's Neoclassical federal office buildings of the early 20th century, and the output of the Office of the Supervising Architect for the U.S. Treasury under James A. Wetmore. Renamed the Ewing T. Kerr Federal Building in 1992. Also a contributing property to the Casper Downtown Historic District.
10	Casper Fire Department Station No. 1	Casper Fire Department Station No. 1	November 4, 1993 (#93001187)	302 South David Street; 42°50′52″N 106°19′37″W	Casper	Distinctive Gothic Revival fire station built in 1921 owing to Casper's abrupt growth and resultant need for a well-equipped, professional fire department. Also a contributing property to the Casper Downtown Historic District.
11	Casper Motor Company-Natrona Motor Company	Casper Motor Company-Natrona Motor Company	February 23, 1994 (#94000042)	230 West Yellowstone Highway; 42°50′55″N 106°19′40″W	Casper	One of Wyoming's earliest and largest car dealerships, built in 1918 in trendy Spanish Colonial Revival style during Casper's oil wealth heyday. Now The Lyric event venue.
12	Chicago and Northwestern Railroad Depot	Chicago and Northwestern Railroad Depot	January 7, 1988 (#87002296)	35231 West Dakota Avenue (original address); Current coordinates are 42°51′37″N 106°12′47″W	Powder River	1910 train station representing the critical role of the Chicago and North Western Railway in stimulating and sustaining the settlement of central Wyoming. Moved to Evansville in 1998.
13	Church of Saint Anthony	Church of Saint Anthony	January 30, 1997 (#96001631)	604 South Center Street; 42°50′38″N 106°19′32″W	Casper	Church noted for its exceptional Romanesque Revival design by Arthur M. Garbutt, built 1919–1920.
14	Consolidated Royalty Building	Consolidated Royalty Building	November 4, 1993 (#93001186)	137–141 South Center Street; 42°50′57″N 106°19′29″W	Casper	One of Casper's last large office buildings from the 1914–1928 oil boom, built 1917–1918 to provide space for multiple oil companies and associated industries.
15	DUX Bessemer Bend Bridge	DUX Bessemer Bend Bridge	February 22, 1985 (#85000428)	County Road CN1-58; 42°46′18″N 106°31′51″W	Bessemer Bend	Warren through truss bridge built 1921–1922 with a unique placement of its vertical members and atypical use of pony truss approach spans. Replaced in 1997.
16	Elks Lodge No. 1353	Elks Lodge No. 1353	January 30, 1997 (#96001632)	108 East 7th Street; 42°50′38″N 106°19′29″W	Casper	Clubhouse built 1920–1922, a master work of architect Arthur M. Garbutt noted for its exceptional Renaissance Revival architecture.
17	Fort Caspar	Fort Caspar	August 12, 1971 (#71000887)	4001 Fort Caspar Road; 42°50′16″N 106°22′18″W	Casper	Site of a key river crossing in the fur trade and westward expansion eras, with a bridge and U.S. Army fort 1858–1867 (partially reconstructed in the 1930s), Pony Express station, and transcontinental telegraph offices.
18	Grant Street Grocery and Market	Grant Street Grocery and Market	October 15, 2008 (#08001005)	815 South Grant Street; 42°50′32″N 106°19′08″W	Casper	Casper's only surviving neighborhood grocery store, established in 1921 during the oil boom and successfully adapting to changes in the economic climate over the years.
19	Independence Rock	Independence Rock	October 15, 1966 (#66000757)	Wyoming Highway 220; 42°29′38″N 107°07′56″W	Alcova vicinity	Major landmark along the Emigrant Trail in Wyoming—a granite monolith on which thousands of explorers and travelers carved their names. Now a state historic site.
20	Martin's Cove	Martin's Cove	March 8, 1977 (#77001383)	47600 Wyoming Highway 220; 42°27′14″N 107°14′21″W	Alcova vicinity	Cirque where about 600 Mormon handcart pioneers sheltered from a deadly blizzard for five days in November 1856—a symbol of the hardships and perseverance on America's westward expansion trails.
21	Masonic Temple	Masonic Temple	August 24, 2005 (#05000926)	105 North Center Street; 42°51′01″N 106°19′30″W	Casper	Exemplary early-20th-century Masonic Temple built in 1914, reflecting Casper's oil boom growth and the importance of Freemasonry among the era's leading citizens. Also a contributing property to the Casper Downtown Historic District.
22	Midwest Oil Company Hotel	Midwest Oil Company Hotel	November 17, 1983 (#83004302)	136 East 6th Street; 42°50′41″N 106°19′27″W	Casper	One of central Casper's few surviving buildings from the 1920s, built to accommodate oil company employees during a housing shortage and becoming a longstanding headquarters in 1930 for social and humanitarian organizations.
23	Dean Morgan Junior High School	Dean Morgan Junior High School	May 3, 2016 (#16000229)	1440 South Elm Street; 42°50′09″N 106°19′49″W	Casper	Casper's first standalone middle school, in use since 1953, and the best surviving example of Wyoming's post–World War II schools and their Modern architecture.
24	Natrona County High School	Natrona County High School	January 7, 1994 (#93001491)	930 South Elm Street; 42°50′30″N 106°19′48″W	Casper	High school and grounds built 1924–1941, noted for its exceptional Collegiate Gothic architecture—a master work of architect Arthur M. Garbutt—and association with the growth of public education in Casper.
25	North Casper Clubhouse	North Casper Clubhouse	February 18, 1994 (#94000043)	1032 East L Street; 42°51′43″N 106°18′44″W	Casper	Depression-era clubhouse spearheaded by a local community group, designed by Goodrich & Krusmark, and built 1938–39 by the National Youth Administration as one of Wyoming's few examples of rammed earth construction.
26	Odd Fellows Building	Odd Fellows Building	June 18, 2009 (#09000455)	136 South Wolcott Street; 42°50′57″N 106°19′27″W	Casper	1952 clubhouse noted for its Modern architecture by Goodrich & Wilking and associations with a post-World War II building boom in downtown Casper and a concurrent resurgence in fraternal orders in small American cities. Also a contributing property to the Casper Downtown Historic District.
27	Ohio Oil Company Building	Ohio Oil Company Building	July 25, 2001 (#01000791)	159 North Wolcott Street; 42°51′04″N 106°19′25″W	Casper	Regional headquarters of the Ohio Oil Company, built 1948–49 and enlarged 1955–56, housing a major force in the economic development of Casper and the state of Wyoming. Also a contributing property to the Casper Downtown Historic District.
28	Ormsby Home		December 29, 2025 (#100012463)	536 South Center Street; 42°50′42″N 106°19′32″W	Casper	1916 house with attached garage, built for wealthy sheep rancher J. Major Ormsby (1869–1948), who invested in downtown Casper construction and was instrumental in establishing wireless telegraphy, the airport, and commuter plane service in the area.
29	Pathfinder Dam	Pathfinder Dam	August 12, 1971 (#71000888)	Off Pathfinder Road; 42°28′04″N 106°51′14″W	Alcova vicinity	One of the nation's first two gravity-arch dams, built 1905–1909 in a remote location—a pioneering federal effort to boost the settlement capacity of the arid American West. Also a contributing property to the Pathfinder Dam Historic District.
30	Pathfinder Dam Historic District	Pathfinder Dam Historic District	June 15, 2015 (#15000357)	Fremont Canyon Road; 42°28′19″N 106°51′09″W	Alcova vicinity	Dam, support structures, later improvements, and housing foundations comprising 12 contributing properties built 1905–1932, reflecting the advent of irrigated agriculture in the region and the testing and refinement of dam design by the Bureau of Reclamation.
31	Rialto Theater	Rialto Theater	February 11, 1993 (#93000037)	102 East Second Street; 42°50′56″N 106°19′30″W	Casper	Early movie theater built in 1921 and extensively remodeled the following year, reflecting the rapid and concurrent prosperity of the motion picture industry and the oil boom–fueled city of Casper. Also a contributing property to the Casper Downtown Historic District.
32	Roosevelt School	Roosevelt School	January 30, 1997 (#96001633)	140 East K Street; 42°51′41″N 106°19′26″W	Casper	Elementary school typifying Casper's public school architecture, established in 1922 in an underserved neighborhood as the population swelled from an oil boom.
33	South Wolcott Street Historic District	South Wolcott Street Historic District	November 23, 1988 (#88002609)	Roughly bounded by S. Center St., E. 9th St., S. Wolcott St., E. 7th St., S. Beech St., and E. 13th St. 42°50′26″N 106°19′25″W	Casper	Cohesive residential neighborhood with 154 contributing properties built 1905–1938, reflecting the prosperity achieved from ranching and later oil drilling and the political leaders such as Bryant Butler Brooks, Patrick Joseph Sullivan, and Joseph M. Carey who emerged from its ranks.
34	Split Rock, Twin Peaks	Split Rock, Twin Peaks	December 22, 1976 (#76001959)	Northwest of Muddy Gap; 42°28′52″N 107°31′46″W	Muddy Gap vicinity	Mountain with a distinctive notched peak, making a prominent landmark along the Emigrant Trail in Wyoming.
35	Stone Ranch Stage Station	Stone Ranch Stage Station	November 1, 1982 (#82001834)	Northwest of Casper on U.S. Routes 20/26; 42°57′44″N 106°39′44″W	Casper vicinity	Stage station built c. 1890—a rare surviving vestige of the brief period when stagecoaches carried passengers, freight, and mail from railroad termini to outlying communities.
36	Tom Sun Ranch	Tom Sun Ranch	October 15, 1966 (#66000753)	47600 Wyoming Highway 220; 42°26′35″N 107°13′07″W	Alcova vicinity	Ranch established in 1872 with rare surviving buildings from the era of open range cattle ranching. Extends into Carbon County. Now part of the Mormon Handcart Visitors' Center.
37	Teapot Rock	Teapot Rock	December 30, 1974 (#74002028)	Off Wyoming Highway 259; 43°14′00″N 106°18′40″W	Midwest vicinity	Sandstone rock formation that lent its name to the Teapot Dome scandal of the 1920s, a notorious case of Cabinet-level political corruption granting private leases on federally conserved oil fields.
38	Townsend Hotel	Townsend Hotel	November 25, 1983 (#83004303)	115 North Center Street; 42°51′01″N 106°19′30″W	Casper	First-class hotel built in 1923; an important social hub and one of the few surviving buildings to showcase the grandiosity of Casper's Roaring Twenties oil boom. Expanded 2008–2009 for government use as the Townsend Justice Center.
39	Tribune Building	Tribune Building	February 18, 1994 (#94000041)	216 East Second Street; 42°50′56″N 106°19′23″W	Casper	Headquarters of the Casper Daily Tribune from 1920 to 1963—Casper's leading newspaper and a key advertising medium for regional businesses. Also a contributing property to the Casper Downtown Historic District.
40	Turner-Cottman Building	Turner-Cottman Building	December 1, 2015 (#15000856)	120–130 West Second Street; 42°50′56″N 106°19′33″W	Casper	1924 retail and office building, noted for its association with the growth of downtown Casper and as a significant work of architect Leon C. Goodrich. Also a contributing property to the Casper Downtown Historic District.
41	Izaak Walton League of America, Charles E. Piersall Chapter, Clubhouse-Lodge		July 24, 2026 (#100011060)	4205 Fort Caspar Road; 42°50′20″N 106°22′28″W	Mills	1934 clubhouse with a 1953 addition, noted for its association with the Izaak Walton League and for its New Deal-funded rustic architecture designed by Goodrich & Krusmark.
42	Edness Kimball Wilkins No. 1 Site	Edness Kimball Wilkins No. 1 Site	August 10, 2015 (#15000520)	Address restricted	Evansville	Native American campsite used from the late Prehistoric Period into the early Protohistoric Period, with locally rare Dismal River culture ceramics.

== See also ==
- List of National Historic Landmarks in Wyoming
- National Register of Historic Places listings in Wyoming
