= Powder River =

Powder River may refer to:

== Places ==
- Powder River (Wyoming and Montana), a tributary to the Yellowstone River in Wyoming and Montana, United States
  - Powder River Country, the area around the river
  - Powder River Basin, a coal-rich geologic basin
  - Powder River Pass, a mountain pass in the Big Horn Mountains of Wyoming
  - Powder River County, Montana, a county in southeastern Montana
  - Powder River, Wyoming, a populated place in Natrona County
  - Powder River station, a former train station in Natrona County
  - Powder River Station-Powder River Crossing, an abandoned settlement in Wyoming
- Powder River (Oregon), a tributary to the Snake River in Oregon, United States

== Military events ==
- Powder River Expedition (1865), a military expedition through the Powder River Country
  - Powder River Battles (1865)
  - Powder River Massacre
- Powder River War, or Red Cloud's War, an 1866 to 1868 armed conflict
- Battle of Powder River, an 1876 battle fought during the Black Hills War
- War on Powder River, or the Johnson County War, an 1889 to 1893 range war in Wyoming

== Sports ==
- Powder River pass, a football play in 1954 giving Arkansas a 6-0 win over Ole Miss

== Transportation ==
- USS LSM(R)-519, renamed Powder River in 1955

== Media ==
- Powder River (film), a 1953 American Western directed by Louis King
- Powder River (radio), an American radio drama series
- Powder River, a 1989 album by Chris LeDoux
