= Powder (disambiguation) =

A powder is a collection of very fine particles that may flow freely when shaken or tilted.

Powder may also refer to:

== Film and television ==
- Powder (1995 film), an American science fiction fantasy film
- Powder (2019 film), a Mexican crime comedy-drama film
- Powder (2022 film), an Indian Tamil-language thriller film
- Powder (2024 film), an Indian Kannada-language comedy film
- Powder (TV series), a TV series on Sony Entertainment Television, India
- A BBC Two ident, used from 1992 until 2001

== Music ==
- Powder (American band), American rock band
- Powder (British band), a mid-1990s Britpop band
- Powders (album), a 2023 album by Eartheater
- A song from the soundtrack of Cowboy Bebop: Knockin' on Heaven's Door
- "Powder", a song by Melanie Martinez from the deluxe edition of her album Portals

== Other uses ==
- Powder (hundred), an ancient subdivision of Cornwall in the United Kingdom
- Powder, Copper, Coal and Otto, the official mascots of the 2002 Winter Olympics in Salt Lake City
- Protocol for Web Description Resources (POWDER), a W3C Working Group
- Powder snow, freshly fallen, uncompacted snow
- Powder River (disambiguation), several places
- Powder, childhood name of Jinx, a character in the League of Legends universe.

== See also ==
- Ann Pouder (1807–1917), British American, one of the first modernly recognized supercentenarians in the world
- Baking powder, a leavening agent
- Face powder, cosmetic applied to the face to set a foundation
- Gunpowder, explosive powder used as a propellant
- Metal powder, a powdered metal such as aluminium powder and iron powder
- Powdered cocaine, a crystalline tropane alkaloid that is obtained from the leaves of the coca plant
- Powdered milk, a milk powder made from dried milk solids
- Powder blue, a color
- Washing powder, detergent that is added for cleaning laundry
- Powdr, an American company that operates ski resorts in the U.S. and Canada
