= Iris Theater =

Iris Theater or Iris Theatre may refer to:

- Iris Theatre (company), a professional theatre company in London, England
- Iris Theatre (Hollywood, California)
- Iris Theater, a property in the Red Lodge Commercial Historic District, Montana
- Casper Motor Company-Natrona Motor Company, later Iris Theater, in Casper, Wyoming
- Desert Star Theater, formerly Iris Theater, Murray, Utah
- Fox Theater (Hollywood, California), formerly Iris Theatre
