= Dean Morgan Junior High School =

Coordinates: 42°50′10″N 106°19′51″W

Dean Morgan Junior High
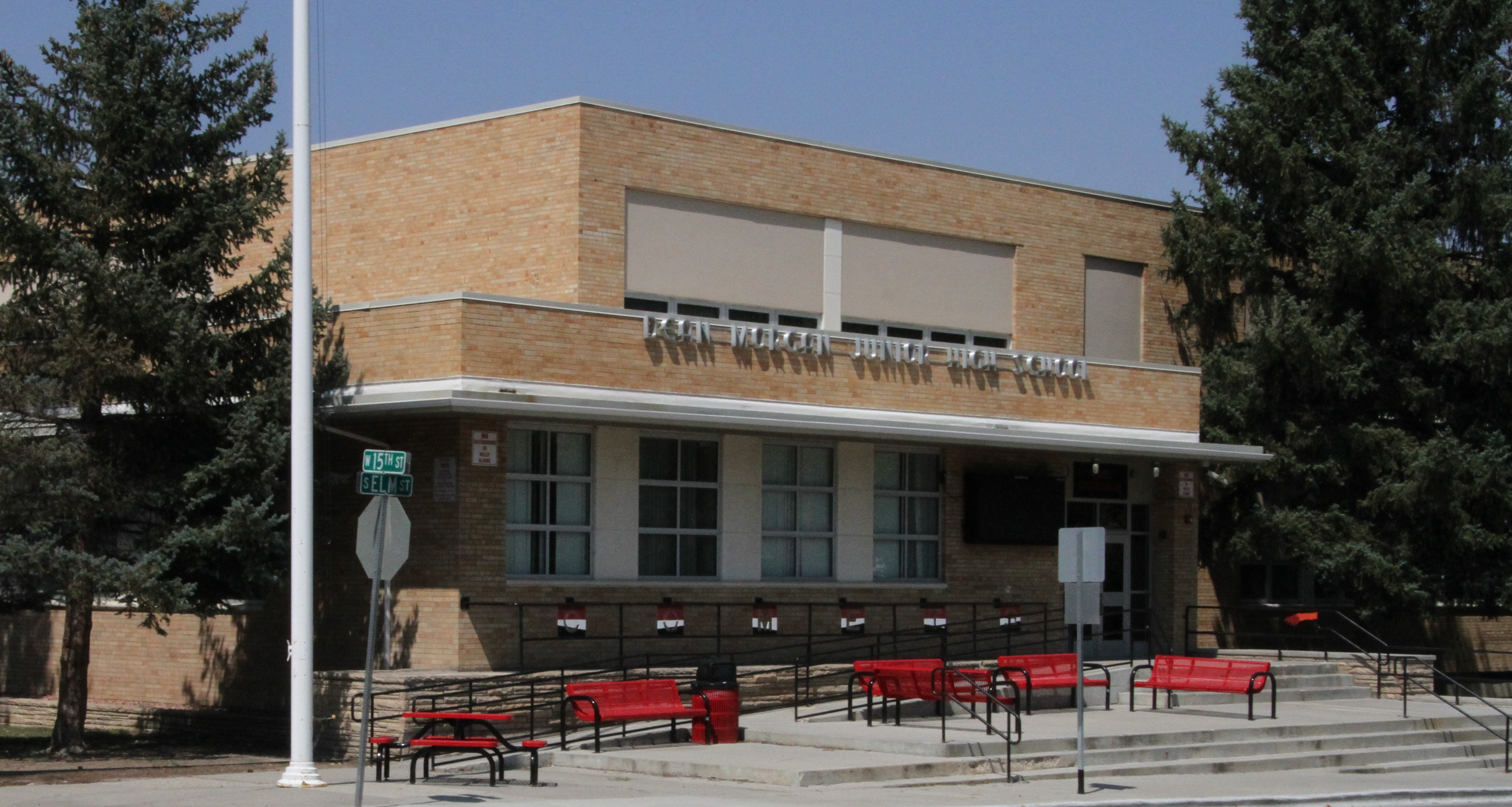
- The school in 2017

Location
- 1440 South Elm Street; Casper, Wyoming; United States

Information
- Type: Public primary
- School district: Natrona County School District #1
- Principal: Clay Cates
- Faculty: 61.23 (FTE)
- Grades: 6–9
- Enrollment: 902 (2018-19)
- Student to teacher ratio: 14.73
- Colors: Red, black, white
- Mascot: Comet
- Website: Dean Morgan Jr. H.S.
- Dean Morgan Junior High
- U.S. National Register of Historic Places
- NRHP reference No.: 16000229
- Added to NRHP: May 3, 2016

Dean Morgan Junior High School is a public school in the Natrona County School District in Casper, Wyoming. The school serves about 900 students in grades six through eight. The building was listed on the National Register of Historic Places in 2016.

== See also ==
- National Register of Historic Places listings in Natrona County, Wyoming
