= Paul Stock House =

Historic house in Wyoming, United States

- U.S. National Register of Historic Places
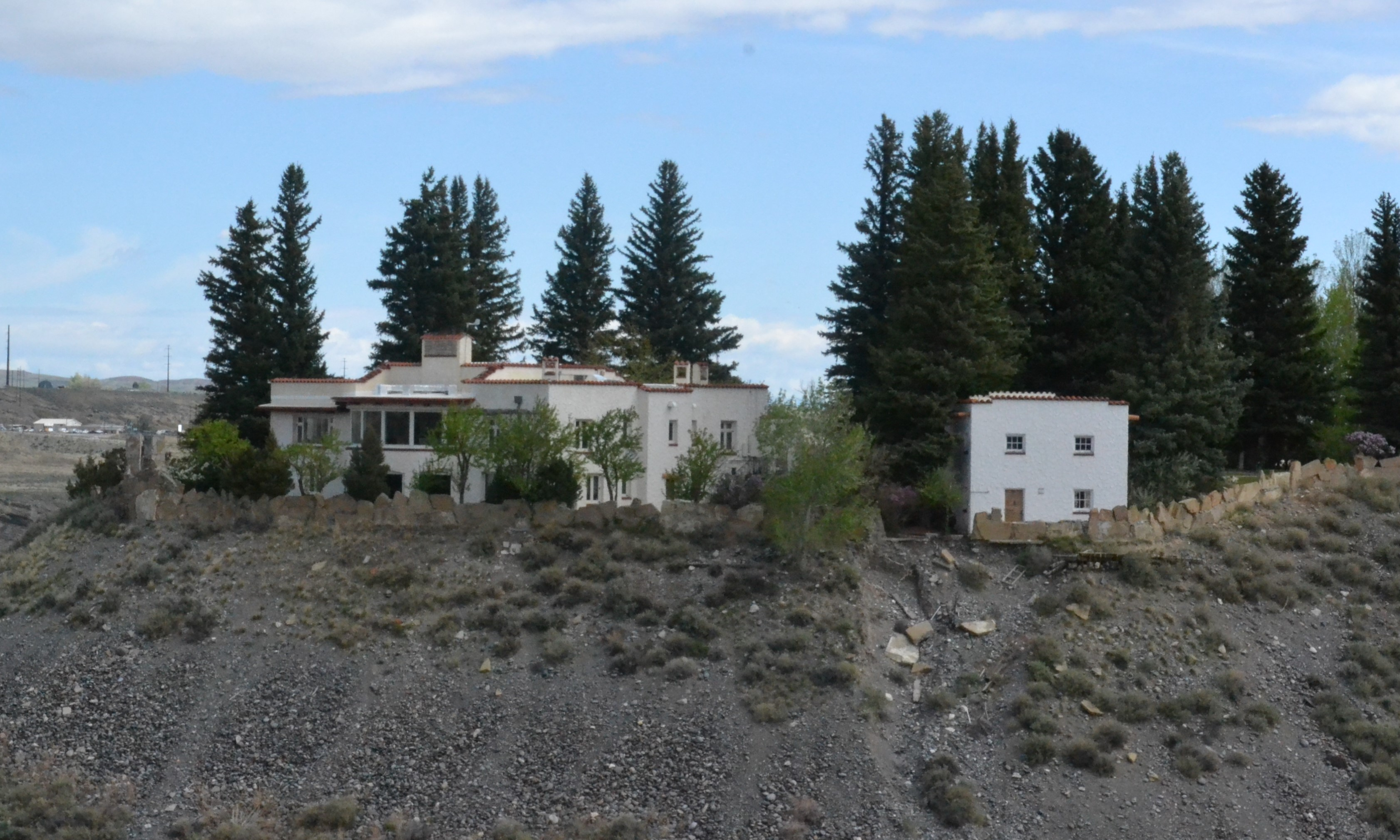

- Location within Wyoming Location within the United States
- Location: 1300 Sunset Dr,, Cody, Wyoming
- Coordinates: 44°31′24″N 109°4′50″W
- Built: 1945
- Built by: Paul Stock
- Architect: Leon Goodrich
- Architectural style: Mission/Spanish Revival, Modern Movement
- NRHP reference No.: 99001727
- Added to NRHP: January 27, 2000

The Paul Stock House was the residence of three-time Cody, Wyoming mayor, oilman, rancher and philanthropist Paul Stock. Built in 1945–46, the house is on a secluded site on a bluff overlooking the Shoshone River, with a view of Heart and Cedar Mountains on the edge of Cody. The house was designed by Leon Goodrich, who was fired after two months because Stock didn't want to be told what to do by the architect. Stock took over the management of the project from then on, building the rambling house in the Spanish Eclectic style. While Stock oversaw the project himself, he kept nearly all of Goodrich's design intact.

The house is laid out in an irregular H plan of about 6,700 square feet (620 m^{2}), with a one-story facade to the front and a two-story elevation where it steps down the bluff to the rear. The exterior is finished in stucco over hollow clay tile with tile roof accents.

Stock employed oilfield technology in his house, using deep pilings for support and employing oilfield piping for water, sewer and gas pipes. Two fireplaces are built of polished well cores from the nearby Oregon Basin. Two guest houses in similar style are nearby on the site.

The Stock House is owned by the Buffalo Bill Historical Center and is used as a guest residence. It was listed on the National Register of Historic Places in 2000.

== See also ==
- Stock Center, the original Buffalo Bill Museum in Cody, purchased by Stock and given to Cody as community center, also listed on the National Register of Historic Places
