= Stock Center =

- U.S. National Register of Historic Places
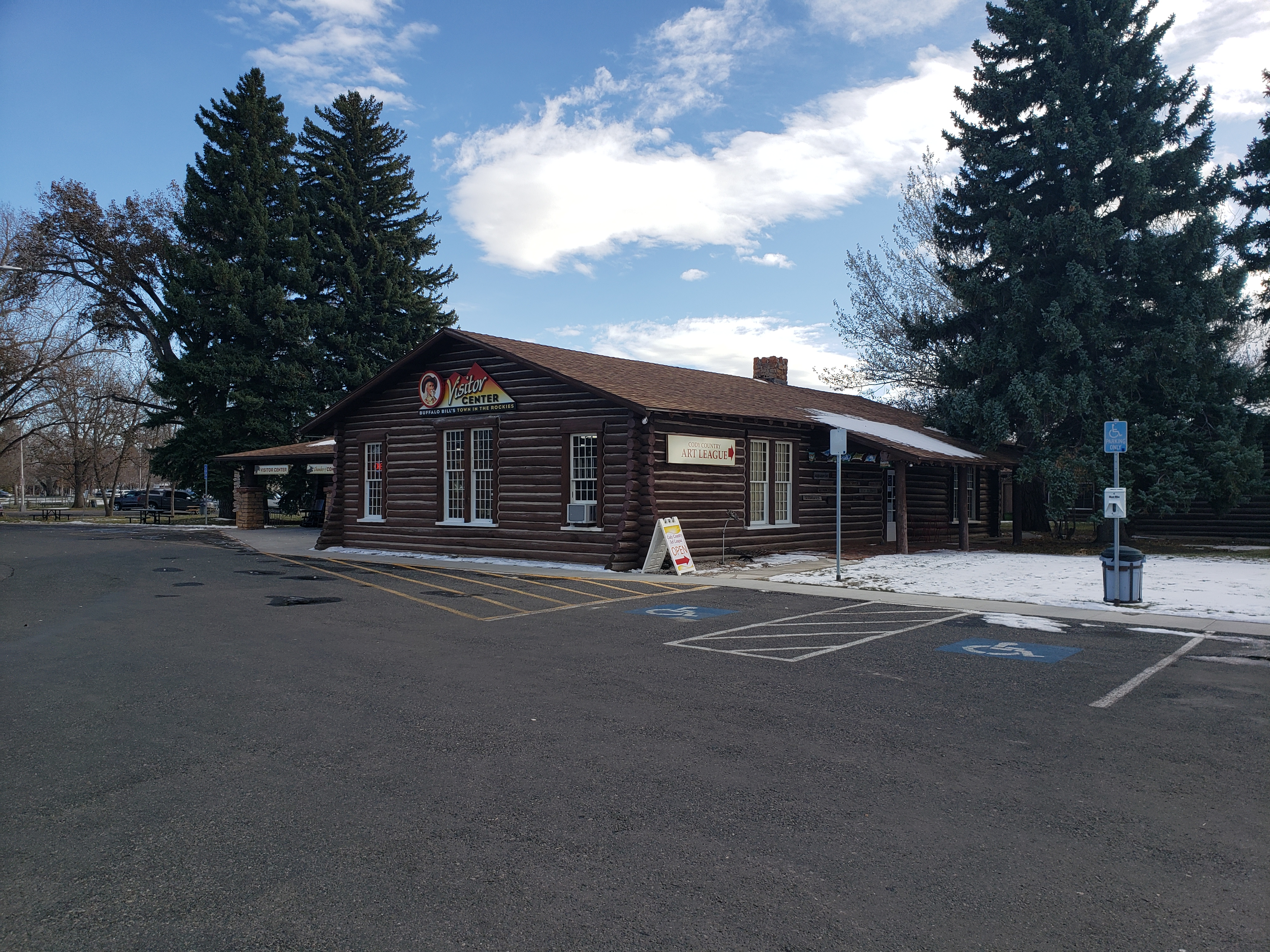
- The Stock Center viewed from the northwest

- Location within Wyoming Location within the United States
- Location: 836 Sheridan Ave., Cody, Wyoming
- Coordinates: 44°31′32″N 109°4′14″W
- Built: 1927
- NRHP reference No.: 76001960
- Added to NRHP: January 1, 1976

The Stock Center in Cody, Wyoming, United States, was built in 1927 as the original home of the Buffalo Bill Museum, serving in that purpose until the museum was relocated to a new complex across the street in 1969. The log structure is intended to suggest a stockman's log cabin, rendered on a large scale.

The irregularly shaped one-story building was arranged with a small lobby leading to exhibit rooms intended to represent a living room, trophy room-library, dining room, kitchen and bedrooms in a rancher's house. These rooms housed the Buffalo Bill Museum's collections. The museum was built as a community project, using Buffalo Bill Cody's T E Ranch Headquarters as the basis for the design.

After museum's move, the former museum was purchased by Paul Stock, a Cody-area oilman, rancher, and three-term mayor of Cody, who then passed the property on to the town of Cody for community use. The Stock Center was placed on the National Register of Historic Places in 1976.

== See also ==
- The Scout (Buffalo Bill Statue), located in the center of Sheridan Avenue between the Stock Center and the Buffalo Bill Historical Center
- Paul Stock House, Stock's residence in Cody, also listed on the National Register of Historic Places
