= Leon C. Goodrich =

American architect

Leon C. Goodrich (January 2, 1892 – December 1968) was an American architect of Casper, Wyoming. A number of his works are listed on the National Register of Historic Places.

== Biography ==
Goodrich was born in Fort Collins, Colorado, in 1892, and moved to Wyoming as an infant. He attended the University of Wyoming and began his architectural career working as a draftsman from 1911 to 1917 for William Dubois in Cheyenne, Wyoming. He was in partnership with Dubois as Dubois & Goodrich from 1917 to 1930, though he moved to Casper during an oil boom in 1917. In 1930, Goodrich formed the Casper, Wyoming firm of Goodrich & Krusmark with Karl Louis Krusmark. In 1949, he formed the Casper, Wyoming firm of Goodrich & Wilking with Jan VanTyne Wilking.

Goodrich was one of four Wyoming architects who received state licensing in 1951 by grandfathering, when the state licensing system was started, and he served as the first Vice President of the state licensing board. He was also a founding member of the Wyoming Chapter of the American Institute of Architects.

Goodrich is credited with the design of numerous buildings throughout Wyoming from the 1920s through the 1960s. A number of his works are listed on the National Register of Historic Places.

== Works ==
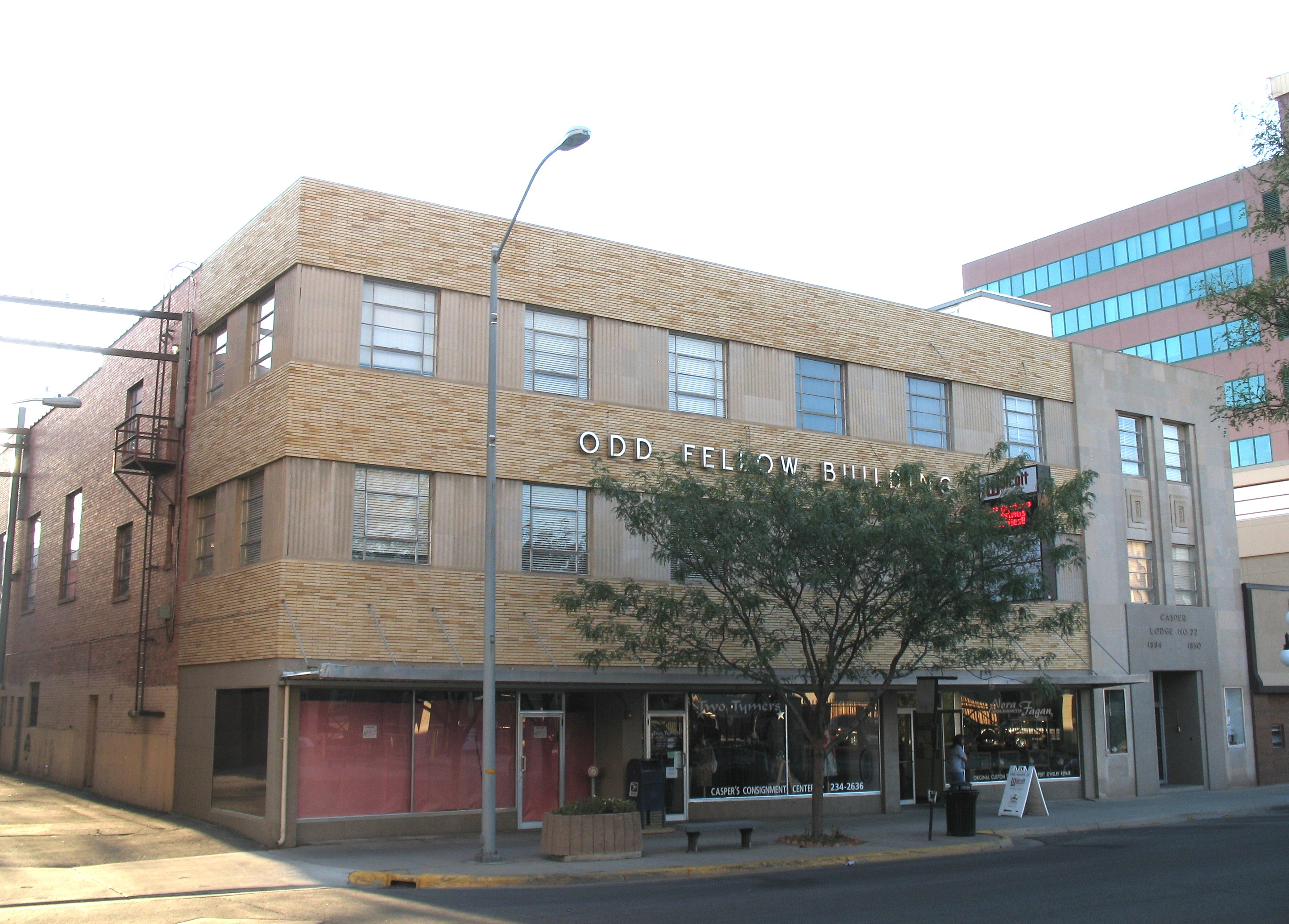
Odd Fellows Building, Casper, Wyoming

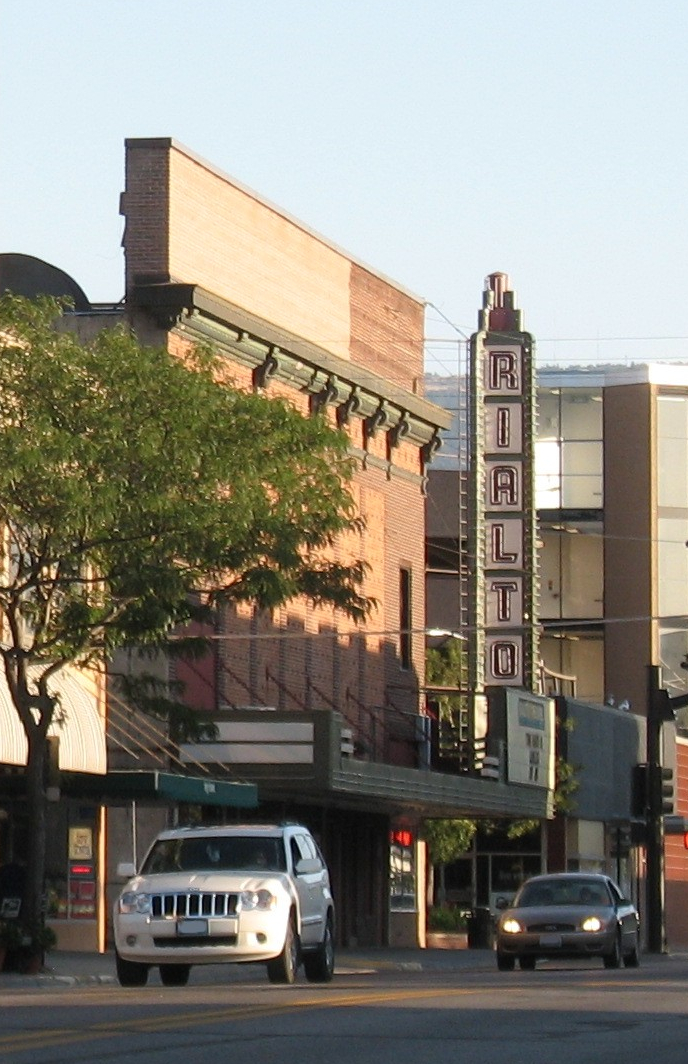
Rialto Theatre

Works include (with variations in attribution):

- Rialto Theatre (1921-1922 remodel), formerly known as the New Lyric Theatre, 102 E. Second St., Casper, Wyoming (Dubois & Goodrich), NRHP-listed
- Turner-Cottman Building (1924), Casper, Wyoming, NRHP-listed
- St. Anthony School (1927), Casper, Wyoming
- Turner-Cottman Building (1924), 120-130 W. Second St., Casper, Wyoming
- Paul Stock House (1945-1946), 1300 Sunset Dr, Cody, WY (Goodrich, Leon), NRHP-listed
- Wyoming Home & Hospital for the Aged (1948), Thermopolis, Wyoming
- Wyoming State Insane Asylum (1948), 831 Highway 150 South, Evanston, Wyoming (four buildings dating to 1948 attributed to Goodrich & Wilking; six large dormitories date from 1907 to 1935 are attributed to William Dubois)
- Odd Fellows Building (1952), 136 S. Wolcott Street, Casper, Wyoming (Goodrich & Wilking), NRHP-listed
- Casper Air Terminal (1955), Casper, Wyoming
- Sheridan Community College (1958), now known as Sheridan College, 3059 Coffeen Avenue, Sheridan, Wyoming
- Casper Junior College (1959), also known as Casper College, 125 College Drive, Casper, Wyoming (works include dormitories designed by Goodrich & Wilking)
- Burlington High School, Burlington, Wyoming, considered to be "one of the few Moderne-style institutional buildings in Wyoming."
- Casper National Guard Armory, 900 Werner Court, Casper, Wyoming (Leon Goodrich)
- Natrona County Courthouse, Casper, Wyoming (Goodrich & Krusmark)
- North Casper Clubhouse, 1002 East "L" Street, Casper, Wyoming (Goodrich & Krusmark), NRHP-listed
- Ziettermeister Building, Casper, Wyoming (Goodrich & Krusmark)
