= Arminto, Wyoming =

- Unincorporated community
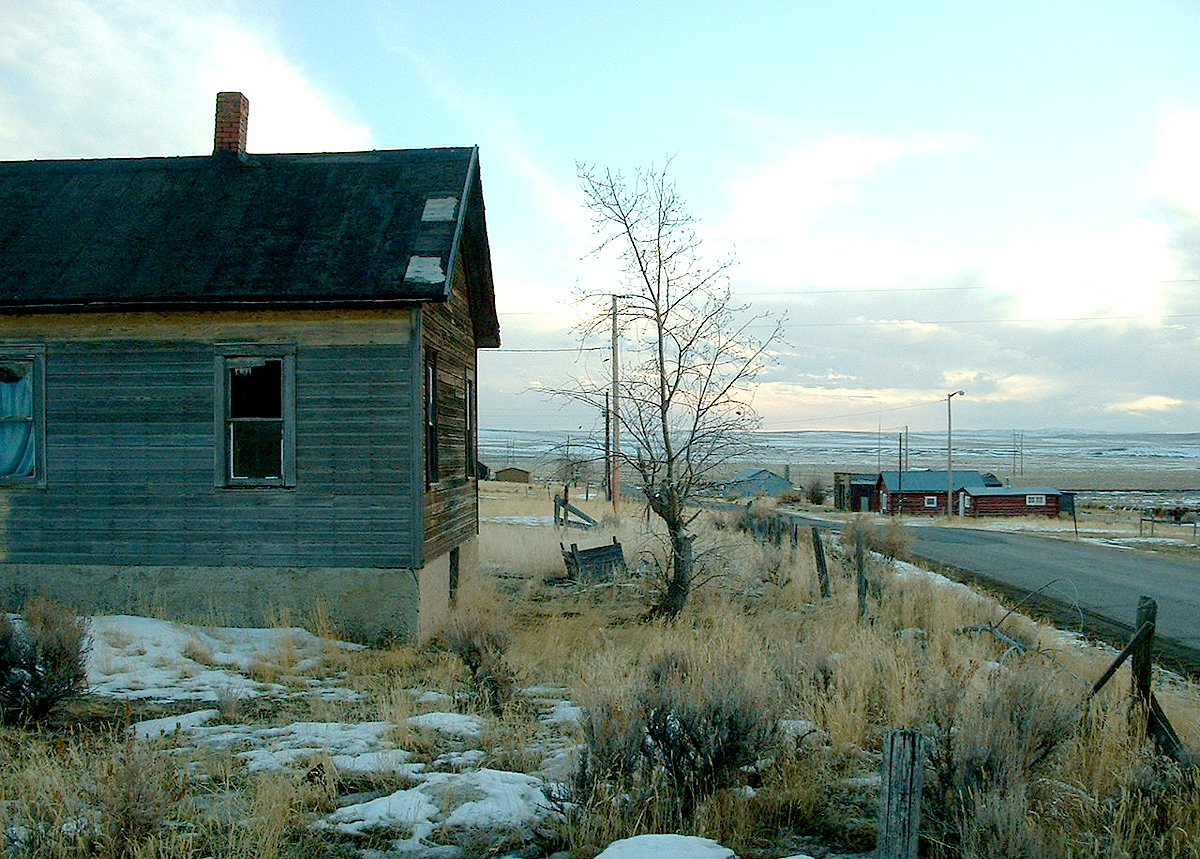
- South view of Arminto, Wyoming

- Location within the state of Wyoming Arminto, Wyoming (the United States)
- Coordinates: 43°10′44″N 107°15′27″W
- Country: United States
- State: Wyoming
- County: Natrona
- Elevation: 6,053 ft (1,845 m)

Population (2000)
  - Total: 5
- Time zone: UTC-7 (Mountain (MST))
  - Summer (DST): UTC-6 (MDT)
- ZIP code: 82630
- Area code: 307
- GNIS feature ID: 1584934

Arminto is an unincorporated community in northwestern Natrona County, Wyoming, United States. It lies along local roads west of the city of Casper, the county seat of Natrona County.

== History ==
Arminto was built as a stop on the Chicago, Burlington and Quincy Railroad, and was named for Manuel Armenta who started the nearby Jack Pot Ranch. Arminto voted to incorporate in 1915; unincorporated towns could not sell liquor in Wyoming at the time.

Although Arminto is now unincorporated, it had a post office, that closed in 1964.

The Big Horn Hotel was moved from Wolton to Arminto in 1913 when the railroad arrived there. It was entered on the National Register of Historic Places in 1978, and was destroyed by a fire in 1985.

== Climate ==
According to the Köppen Climate Classification system, Arminto has a semi-arid climate, abbreviated "BSk" on climate maps.
