= Big Horn Hotel =

- U.S. National Register of Historic Places
- Location within Wyoming Location within the United States
- Location: Main St., Arminto, Wyoming
- Coordinates: 43°10′42″N 107°15′24″W
- Area: less than one acre
- Built: 1906
- NRHP reference No.: 78002831
- Added to NRHP: December 18, 1978

The Big Horn Hotel, on Main St. in Arminto, Wyoming, was built in 1906. It was listed on the National Register of Historic Places in 1978.

The hotel was built in 1906 in Wolton, Wyoming, and was moved to Arminto in 1913 when the Chicago, Burlington and Quincy Railroad (later Burlington Northern) came through Arminto.

It was moved by 30 teams of horses and mules according to some reports, or by 16 horses according to another.

The hotel was destroyed by fire on February 17, 1985.

Research materials about the hotel were archived at the University of Wyoming in Laramie.
