= Turner-Cottman Building =

- U.S. National Register of Historic Places
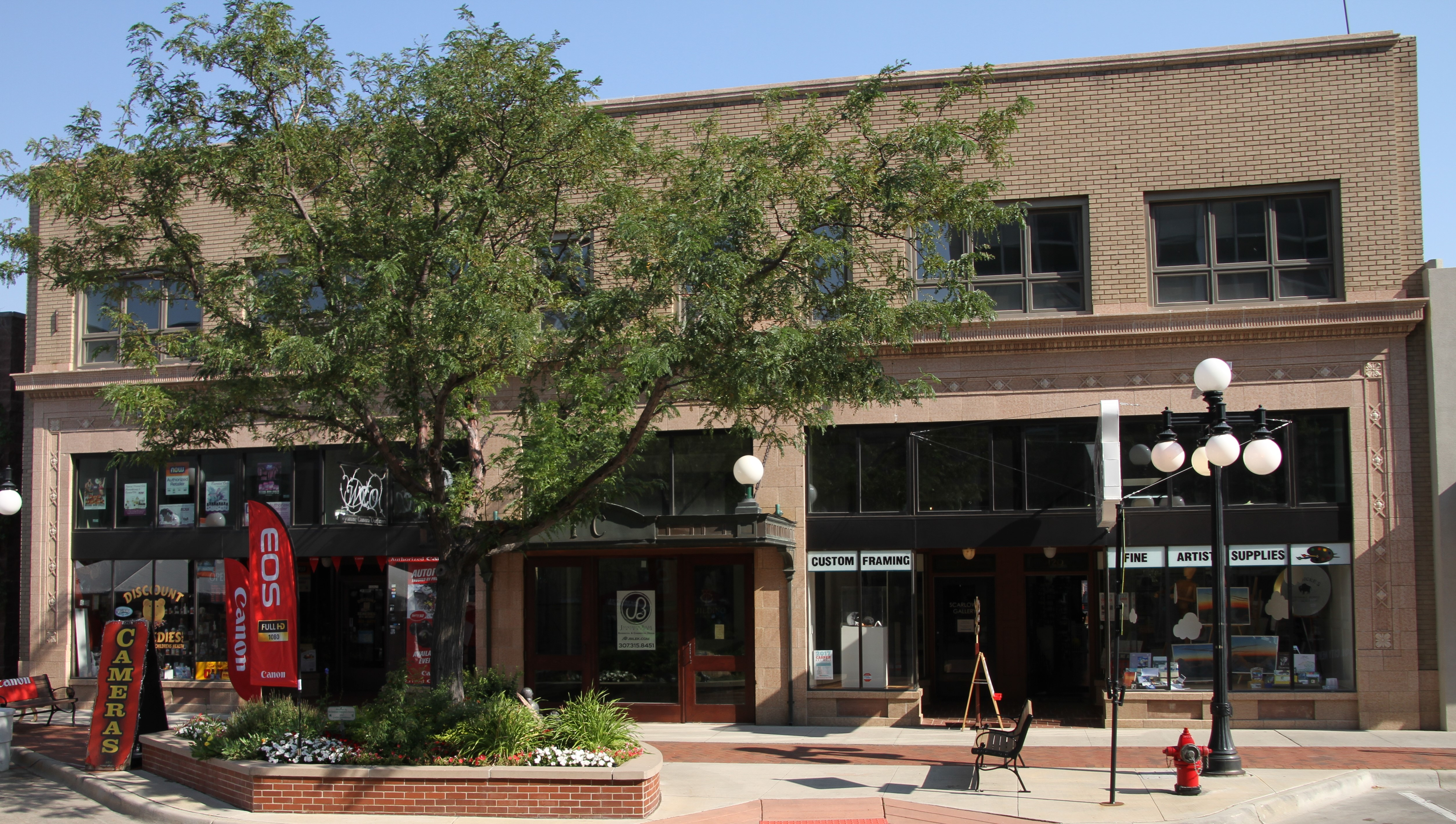

- Location within Wyoming
- Location: 120-130 West Second St., Casper, Wyoming
- Coordinates: 42°50′55″N 106°19′33″W
- Area: .17 acres (0.069 ha)
- Built: 1924
- Architect: Leon Goodrich and Fred Cottman
- Architectural style: 20th Century Commercial
- NRHP reference No.: 15000856
- Added to NRHP: December 1, 2015

The Turner-Cottman Building, at 120-130 West Second Street in Casper, Wyoming, was listed on the National Register of Historic Places in 2015.

It was built in 1924. It was designed by architect Leon Goodrich at an early point in his career, while in partnership with DuBois.
