= Ohio Oil Company Building =

- U.S. National Register of Historic Places
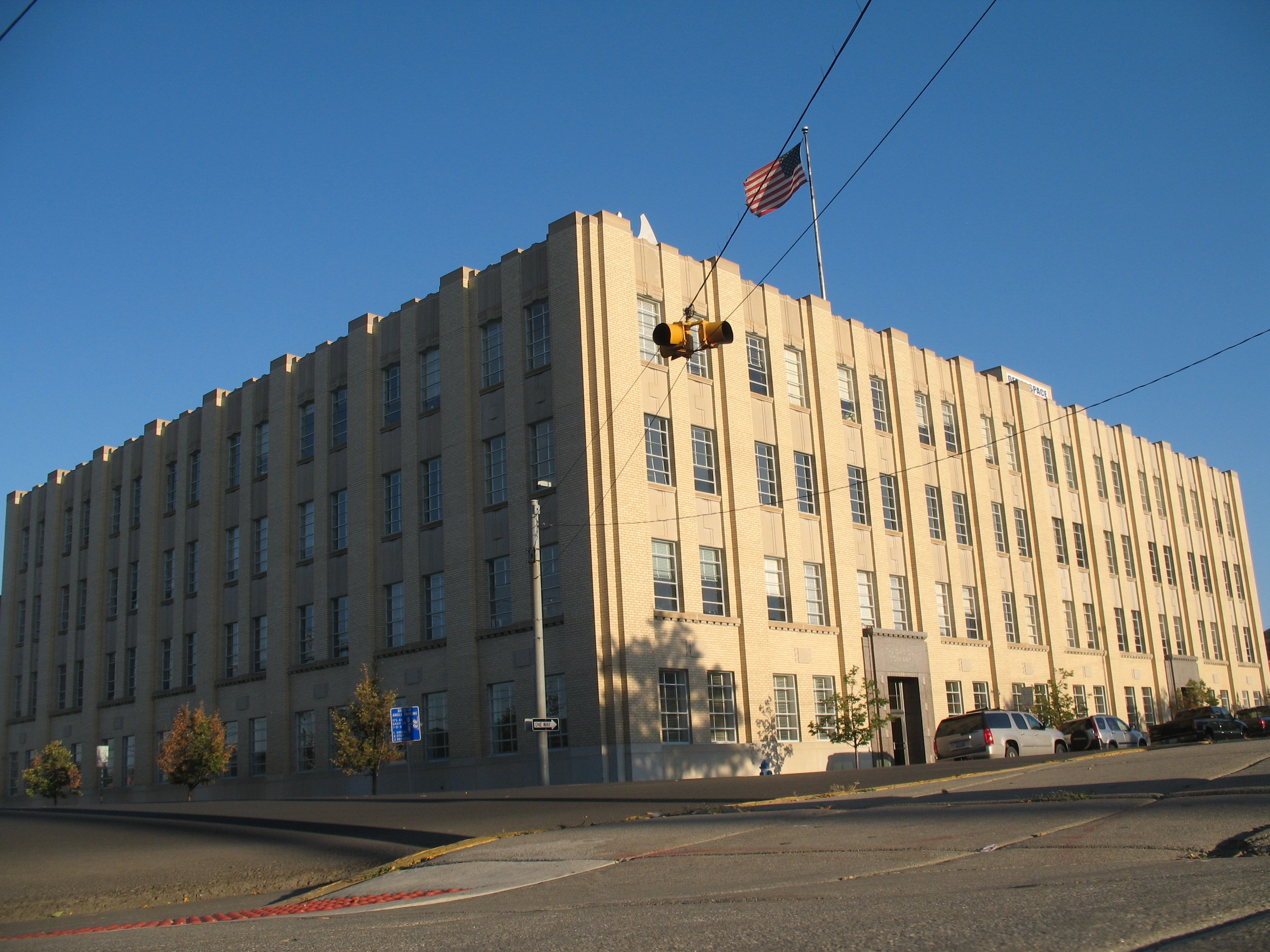
- the building in 2012

- Location within Wyoming Location within the United States
- Location: 159 N. Wolcott St., Casper, Wyoming
- Coordinates: 42°51′4″N 106°19′24″W
- Area: 0.5 acres (0.20 ha)
- Built: 1948-1949 and 1955-1956
- Architect: A.G. Hall and others
- Architectural style: Art Deco
- NRHP reference No.: 01000791
- Added to NRHP: July 25, 2001

The Ohio Oil Company Building in Casper, Wyoming, United States, was built in 1949. Also known as the Marathon Oil Company Building, it was listed on the National Register of Historic Places in 2001.

It is a four-story Art Deco light tan brick 141 by 178 feet (43 m × 54 m) building.

== History ==
It was built in 1948-1949 to serve as regional headquarters for the Ohio Oil Company, which became the Marathon Oil Company in 1962, with design by Arthur G. Hall of the Cleveland architectural firm of Wilbur Watson Associates. The firm was also architect for an expansion of the building in 1955-56.

As of 1972, about 500 people were employed at the building, performing "production, geology, land acquisition, engineering, accounting, legal affairs, tax, title and lease records, environmental concerns, safety, office services, and employee relations" functions for an area including 14 states and part of Canada. U.S. Steel acquired the Marathon Oil Company in 1972 and, in 1986, regional headquarters were transferred to Cody, Wyoming, and eventually the building was closed.

It stood vacant for 10 years until it was renovated in 1997 and achieved full occupancy by new tenants in 1998.

The building was deemed significant for its association with "the Wyoming oil Industry and its importance to the economic development of the state as a whole and to the City of Casper in particular." And it was also deemed significant for its Art Deco architecture, as it demonstrates "several basic elements of the Art Deco style of architecture, and the exterior is pristine."

In 2023, it was one of the 38 places in Natrona County, Wyoming listed on the National Register.
