= Stone Ranch Stage Station =

- U.S. National Register of Historic Places
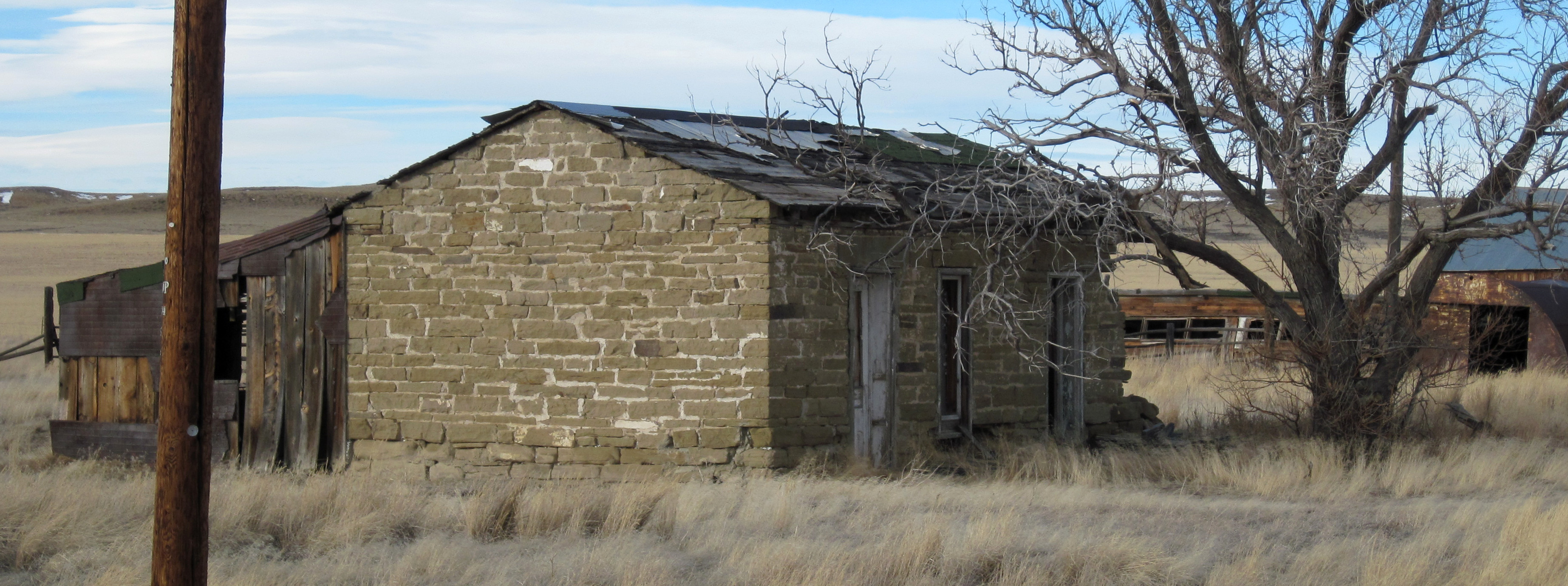

- Location within Wyoming Location within the United States
- Nearest city: Casper, Wyoming
- Coordinates: 42°57′44″N 106°39′44″W
- Area: less than one acre
- Built: 1890
- NRHP reference No.: 82001834
- Added to NRHP: November 1, 1982

The Stone Ranch Stage Station is a stagecoach station located near U.S. Routes 20 and 26 northwest of Casper, Wyoming. The station opened in 1890 along a stagecoach line connecting Casper to Lander and Thermopolis. As railroads had not been built further than Casper, the stagecoach provided the primary means of bringing settlers and goods into central Wyoming. The stagecoach station provided food and shelter to travelers along the stagecoach line. After the Chicago and North Western Railway extended its line further into central Wyoming in the early 20th century, the stagecoach line became obsolete, and the station closed. It is one of the few Wyoming stagecoach stations which is still standing and relatively intact.

The station was added to the National Register of Historic Places on November 1, 1982.
