= Odd Fellows Building (Casper, Wyoming) =

- U.S. National Register of Historic Places
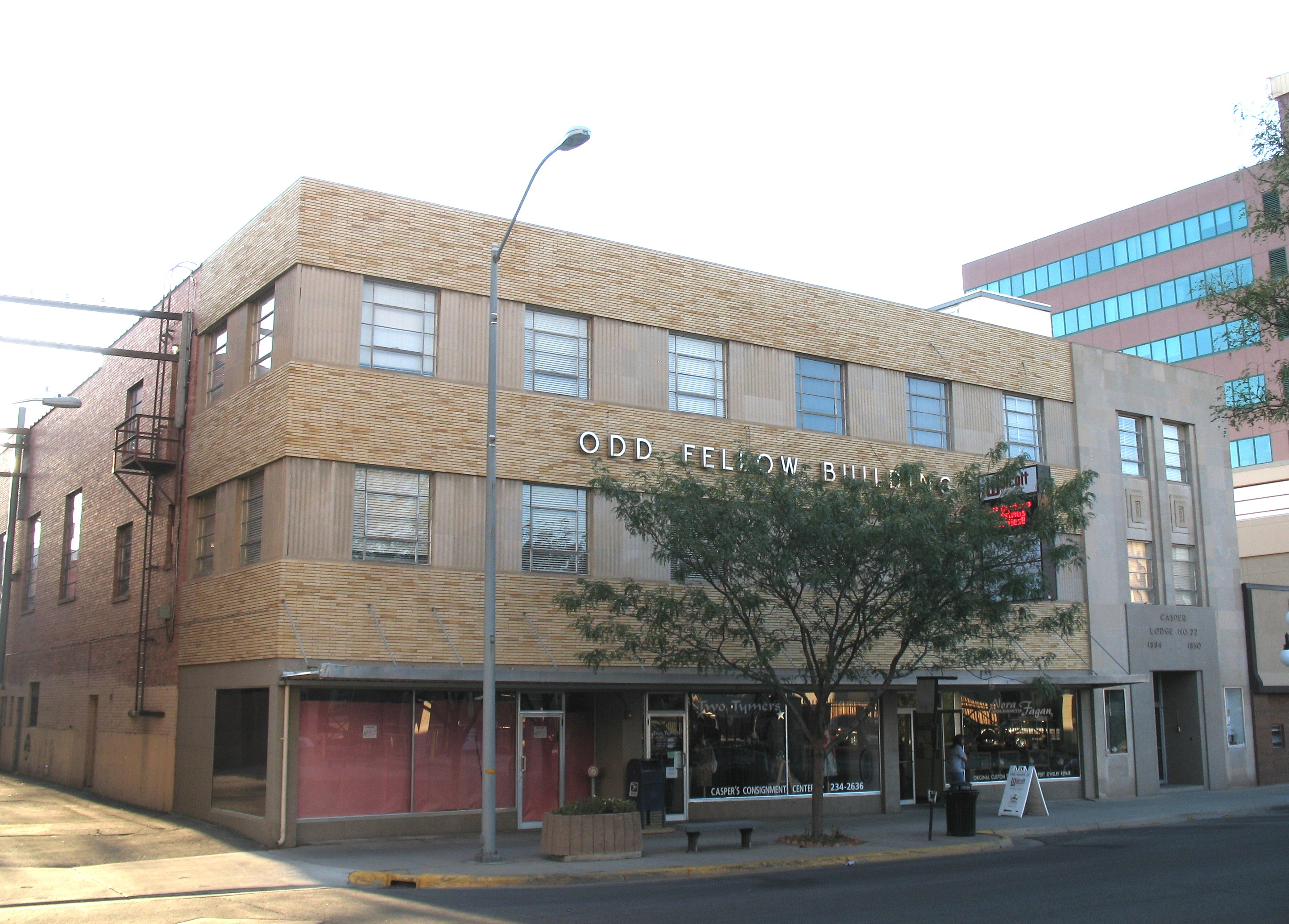

- Location within Wyoming Location within the United States
- Location: 136 S. Wolcott St., Casper, Wyoming
- Coordinates: 42°50′57″N 106°19′27″W
- Area: less than one acre
- Built: 1952
- Architect: Jan Wilking; Goodrich & Wilking
- Architectural style: Post WW II Commercial
- NRHP reference No.: 09000455
- Added to NRHP: June 18, 2009

The Odd Fellow Building or Odd Fellows Building, now known as Wolcott Galleria, is a historic building in Casper, Wyoming, United States. It was built in 1952 and designed by architect Jan Wilking of local architectural firm Goodrich & Wilking. Casper's economy was then doing well and this building, unusual for Casper, was built with an arcade of first floor shops. The Odd Fellows used the second floor, which had a double-height ballroom. There were offices on the third.

It was listed on the National Register of Historic Places in 2009.

This building is now known as the "Wolcott Galleria", and home to home to a number of retail shops, as well as a banquet hall.
