= Grant Street Grocery and Market =

- U.S. National Register of Historic Places
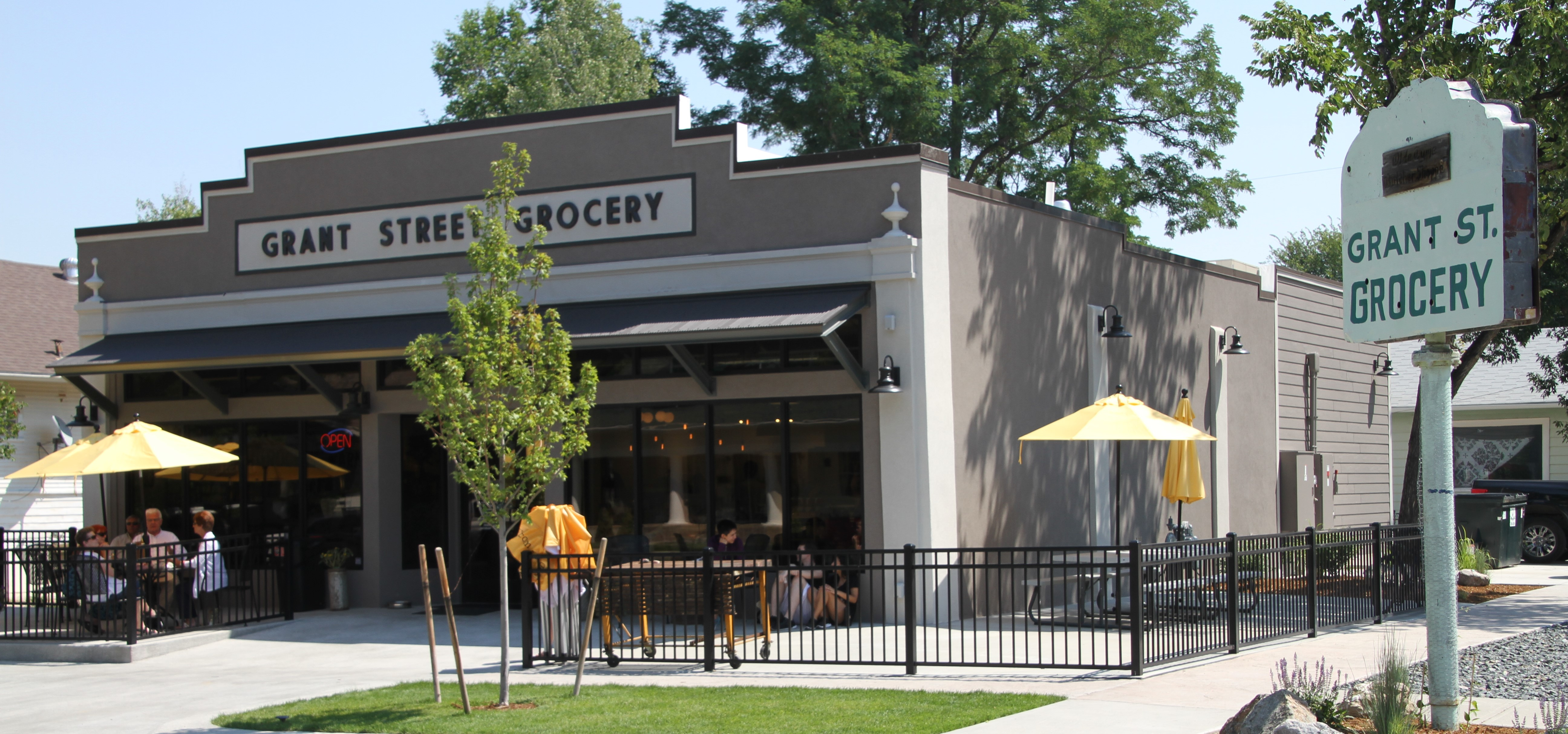

- Location within Wyoming
- Location: 815 S. Grant St., Casper, Wyoming
- Coordinates: 42°50′30″N 106°19′02″W
- Area: less than one acre
- Built: 1921
- Architectural style: Early Commercial
- NRHP reference No.: 08001005
- Added to NRHP: October 15, 2008

The Grant Street Grocery and Market, at 815 S. Grant St. in Casper, Wyoming, was built in 1921. It was listed on the National Register of Historic Places in 2008.

The store was under renovation in 2016 to re-open as a neighborhood grocery store, by five partners who were neighbors.

It was re-opened in 2017.
