= North Casper Clubhouse =

- U.S. National Register of Historic Places
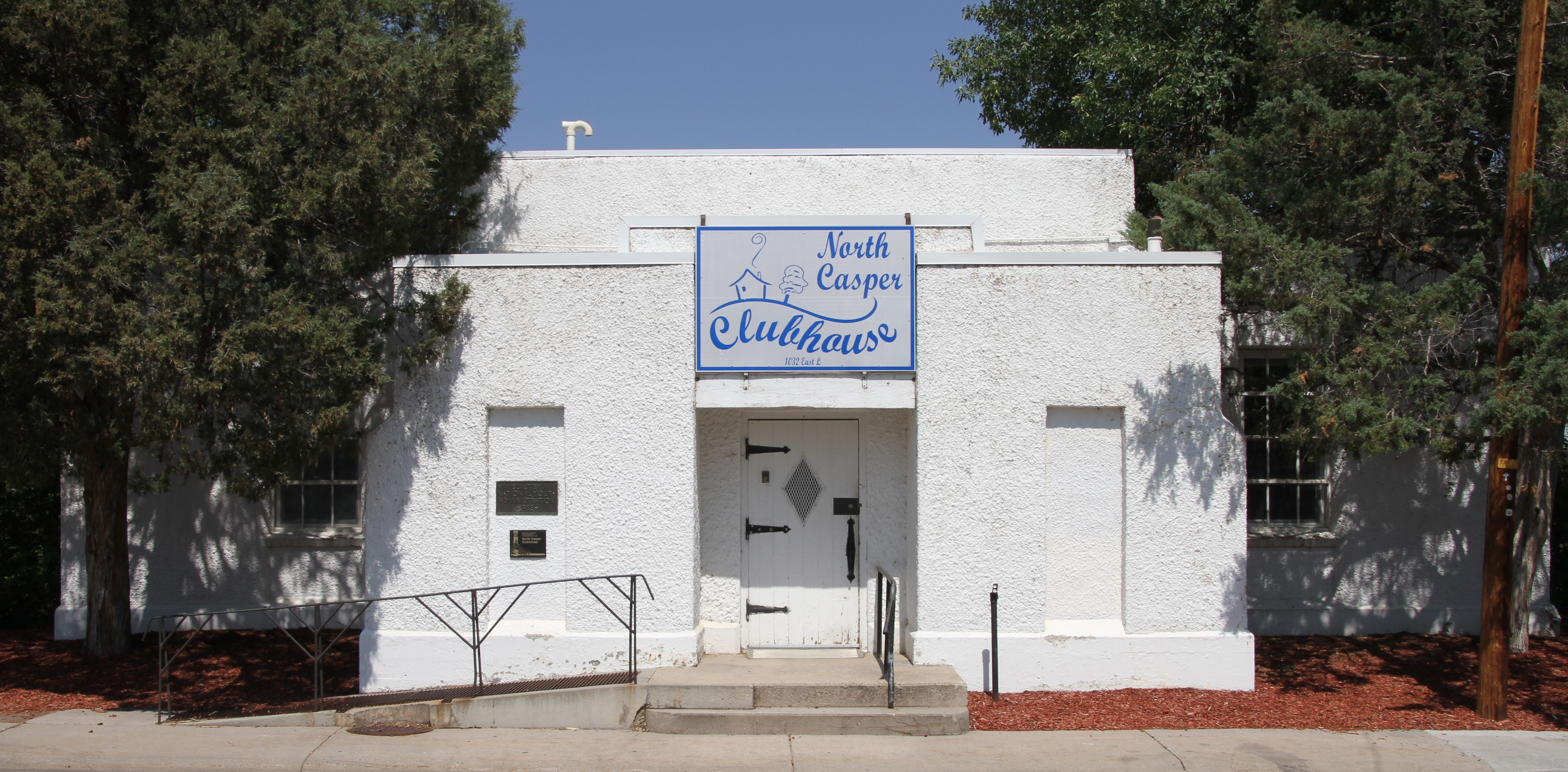
- The North Casper Clubhouse in 2017

- Location within Wyoming Location within the United States
- Location: 1032 East L Street, Casper, Wyoming
- Coordinates: 42°51′43″N 106°18′42″W
- Area: 2 acres (0.81 ha)
- Built: 1938
- Built by: National Youth Administration
- Architect: Goodrich and Krusmark
- Architectural style: Pueblo Revival
- NRHP reference No.: 94000043
- Added to NRHP: February 18, 1994

The North Casper Clubhouse at 1032 East L Street in Casper, Wyoming is a relatively rare example of rammed earth construction in Wyoming. It was built in 1938 by the National Youth Administration, a depression-era works organization. The design was by Casper architects Goodrich and Krusmark. It served as a clubhouse.

The building was listed on the National Register of Historic Places in 1994.
