= South Wolcott Street Historic District =

Historic district in Wyoming, United States

- U.S. National Register of Historic Places
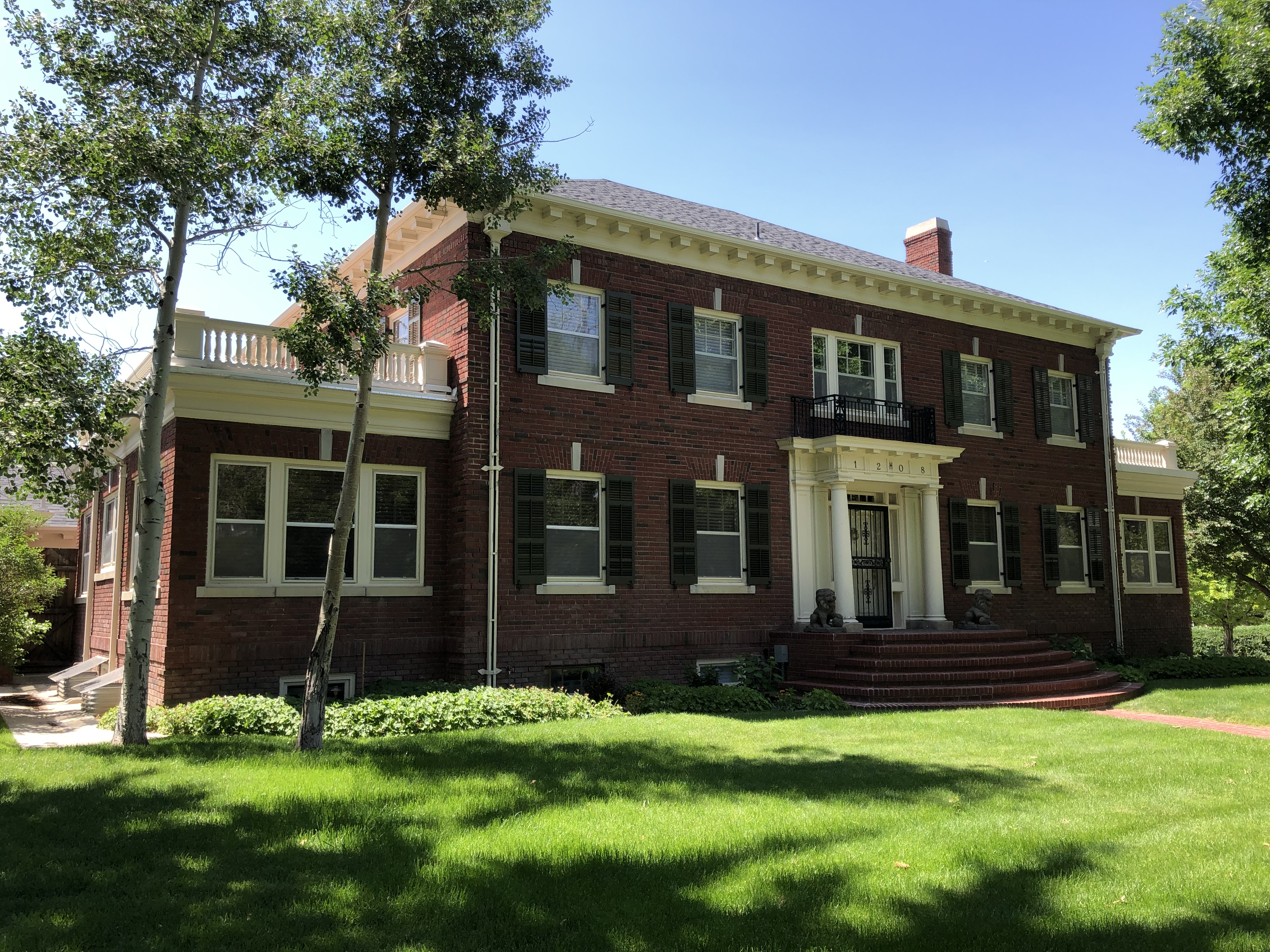

- Location within Wyoming
- Location: Roughly bounded by S. Center St., E. Ninth St., S. Wolcott St., E. Seventh St., S. Beech St., and E. Thirteenth St., Casper, Wyoming
- Coordinates: 42°50′25″N 106°19′21″W
- Area: 61 acres (25 ha)
- Architectural style: Colonial Revival, Late 19th And Early 20th Century American Movements, Tudor Revival
- NRHP reference No.: 88002609
- Added to NRHP: November 23, 1988

The South Wolcott Street Historic District in Casper, Wyoming is a 61 acres (25 ha) historic district covering about 22 residential blocks south of downtown. The district is roughly bounded by S. Center St., E. Ninth St., S. Wolcott St., E. Seventh St., S. Beech St., and E. Thirteenth St. It was listed on the National Register of Historic Places in 1988.

It included 154 contributing buildings. Significant ones include:

- Bryant Butler Brooks House, at 1208 South Wolcott Street, a red brick estate on two large lots, with a port cochere
- 1025 South Durbin Street, a white clapboarded house.
