= Powder River (radio) =

- Genre: Radio drama
- Running time: 30min
- Country of origin: United States
- Language(s): English
- Home station: XM Satellite Radio from 2005-2013, Imagination Theater First show of the month
- Syndicates: Audible, iTunes, Amazon.
- Starring: Jerry Robbins, Derek Aalerud, Lincoln Clark, Joseph Zamparelli, Shana Dirik, Marcia Friedman, Diane Lind, Diane Capen, Gabriel Clark.
- Announcer: Bill Hammond (seasons 1-4), Sam Donato (Seasons 5- present)
- Created by: Jerry Robbins
- Written by: Jerry Robbins
- Directed by: Jerry Robbins
- Produced by: Colonial Radio Theatre on the Air
- Executive producer(s): Mark Vander Berg
- Edited by: Seth Adam Sher, Chris Snyder, M.J. Cogburn, Neil Gustin, Jerry Robbins
- Senior editor(s): Seth Adam Sher
- Original release: 2004 – current
- No. of episodes: 150
- Opening theme: Music by Jeffrey Gage

Powder River is a radio-drama series produced by the Colonial Radio Theatre on the Air. The series is written by Jerry Robbins, and takes place in Clearmont, Wyoming. It aired on Imagination Theater.

Originally planned for a limited run, the series was extended to multiple seasons.

== Episodes ==
=== Season One (2004) ===
- 1: "The Preacher"
- 2: "A Tangled Rope"
- 3: "A Friend in Need"
- 4: "Battle at Ricochet Rock"
- 5: "The Gold Wagon"
- 6: "Peace of Mind"
- 7: "The Lost Mine"
- 8: "Never the Twain"
- 9: "The Winter Soldier"
- 10: "The Wind in the Mountain"
- 11: "The Vengeance Trail"
- 12: "The Wine of Life"
- 13: "Mark of a Killer"
- 14: "Dancing with the Devil"
- 15: "Thunder on the River"

=== Season Two (2005) ===
- 16: "New Beginnings"
- 17: "The Overland Stage"
- 18: "Jenny White"
- 19: "War Paint"
- 20: "An Old Friend"
- 21: "Blood on Montana Snow"
- 22: "The Blizzard"
- 23: "Pray I Don't Catch Up"
- 24: "The General"
- 25: "On the Trail of the Big Horn"
- 26: "Son of the Morning Star"
- 27: "The Iron Horse"
- 28: "Ellsworth"
- 29: "Dr. Whitney"
- 30: "Nothing is Forever"

=== Season Three (2006) ===
- 31: "Wanted"
- 32: "Bandit's Pass"
- 33: "Just Like Home"
- 34: "Judge Parker"
- 35: "The Awful Tooth"
- 36: "Morgan's Town, Part One"
- 37: "Morgan's Town, Part Two"
- 38: "Morgan's Town, Part Three"
- 39: "Till Death Do Us Part"
- 40: "The Winds of the Prairie"
- 41: "The Bride From the East"
- 42: "The Instant of Unexpected"
- 43: "The Wagon Boy"
- 44: "The New Owner"
- 45: "Moment of Truth"

=== Season Four (2006) ===
- 46: "Return of the Legend, Part One"
- 47: "Return of the Legend, Part Two"
- 48: "The Nitro Gang"
- 49: "Jack Sherman Escapes"
- 50: "Twilight"
- 51: "In Chicago"
- 52: "Revelations"
- 53: "Ambush at Powder River"
- 54: "The Shootin' Arm"
- 55: "The Tomahawk Trail"
- 56: "The River Pirates"
- 57: "The Man in the Iron Mask"
- 58: "The Railroad"
- 59: "The Buffalo"
- 60: "End of Track"

=== Specials (2007) ===
- S01: "Guns of Powder River" (Feature-length)
- S02: "Powder River and the Mountain of Gold" (Feature-length)

=== Season Five (2011) ===
- 61: "The Twisted Badge, Part One"
- 62: "The Twisted Badge, Part Two"
- 63: "The Twisted Badge, Part Three"
- 64: "Rawhoof"
- 65: "Those We Leave Behind, Part One"
- 66: "Those We Leave Behind, Part Two"
- 67: "Into Their Own Hands, Part One"
- 68: "Into Their Own Hands, Part Two"
- 69: "Dry Goods and Hardware"
- 70: "The Rival"
- 71: "The Tip of the Hand and The Tell of the Eye"
- 72: "Why Dawes is a Bachelor"
- 73: "The Gunman"
- 74: "Happily Ever After"
- 75: "Clearmont"

=== Season Six (2012-2013) ===
- 76: "Out of the Blue"
- 77: "Changes and Tall Tales"
- 78: "Challenges"
- 79: "The Ghost"
- 80: "The Fight part 1"
- 81: "The Fight part 2"
- 82: "The Thanksgiving Story part 1"
- 83: "The Thanksgiving Story part 2"
- 84: "The River Romance"
- 85: "The Modern Age"
- 86: "The New Hat"
- 87: "The Silent Night"
- 88: "Conversations"
- 89: "Doc's Peril"
- 90: "The Fond Farewell"

=== Season Seven (2013) ===
- 91: The Cattle On A Thousand Hills, Part 1
- 92: The Cattle On A Thousand Hills, Part 2
- 93: The Cattle On A Thousand Hills, Part 3
- 94: Our Bugles Sang Truce
- 95: The Wild West Show, Part 1
- 96: The Wild West Show, Part 2
- 97: The Map Of Legend
- 98: The Great Stagecoach Race
- 99: Pennies On A Dead Mans Eyes
- 100: The Rustlers
- 101: The Fire, Part 1
- 102: The Fire, Part 2

=== Season Eight (2013) ===
- 103: A Single Bullet
- 104: The Man Of The Week
- 105: The Point Of No Return
- 106: Look Towards The Sunrise
- 107: From The Ashes Will Rise
- 108: The Law And His Son
- 109: The Dying Breed
- 110: Mrs. Octavia Hudson
- 111: The Happy Times
- 112: The Cheyenne Kid
- 113: The Prisoner Transfer, Part 1
- 114: The Prisoner Transfer, Part 2

=== Season Nine (2014) ===
- 115: Across The Rio Grande
- 116: Camargo
- 117: Gunfight At Camargo
- 118: The Ladies And The Outlaw
- 119: The Prairie League
- 120: Apache Territory
- 121: The Shaman, Part 1
- 122: The Shaman, Part 2
- 123: Repent!
- 124: Dan's Mountain
- 125: The Nightmare Came In With The Storm
- 126: Stagecoach To Tombstone

=== Season Ten (2014) ===
- 127: The Summer Visit
- 128: Incident At Dry Wells
- 129: Trouble At Coal Creek
- 130: The Phantom Train
- 131: The Photograph
- 132: The Gypsy Curse
- 133: The Reflection In The Mirror Is Not Mine
- 134: When Henry M. Teller Came To Town
- 135: Second Hand Gold
- 136: The Oil Baron
- 137: Boom Town
- 138: Bill Of Sale

=== Season Eleven (2015) ===
- 139: The Man From Isandlwana, Part 1
- 140: The Man From Isandlwana, Part 2
- 141: Arrival
- 142: When We Trust
- 143: The Eviction
- 144: An Opinion Of Judgment
- 145: Death Cancels Everything
- 146: The Valley Of No Return
- 147: Levi And The Pirate
- 148: The Arrangement
- 149: Where Do The Years Go?
- 150: The Darkness Of The Light

=== Season Twelve (2018-2019) ===
- 151: Lighten the Burden
- 152: Nothing is Forever
- 153: Last Train from Kansas City
- 154: The Homecoming
- 155: The Left Hook
- 156: The Renegades
- 157: Big Business
- 158: Tea Room of the Golden Nugget
- 159: The Storm and the Snake
- 160: The Showgirl
- 161: Of Love, Marriage and Goodbye
- 162: In Paris, In Dreams
