= Casper Downtown Historic District =

Historic district in Wyoming, United States

- U.S. National Register of Historic Places
- U.S. Historic district
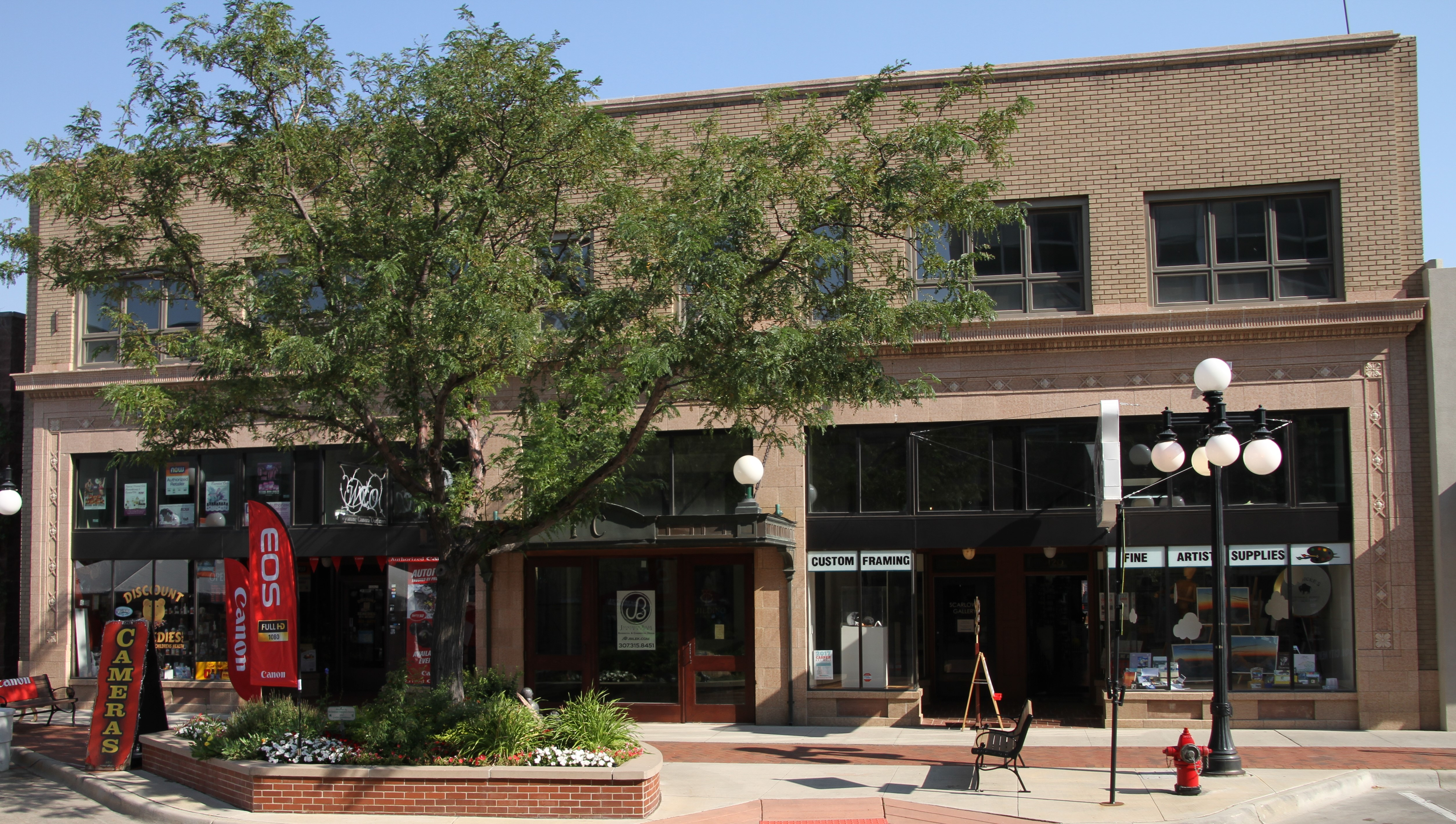
- Turner-Cottman Building

- Location within Wyoming Location within the United States
- Location: Generally bounded by Midwest Ave., W. B, W. C, & Beech Sts., Casper, Wyoming
- Coordinates: 42°50′55″N 106°19′31″W
- Architect: Multiple
- NRHP reference No.: 16000732
- Added to NRHP: October 17, 2016

The Casper Downtown Historic District in Casper, Wyoming, US is a historic district which was listed on the National Register of Historic Places in 2016. The district is generally bounded by David St., East B C St., Beech St., and Midwest Ave.

It includes the Turner-Cottman Building at 124 West Second Street.
