= Casper Motor Company-Natrona Motor Company =

- Casper Motor Company--Natrona Motor Company
- U.S. National Register of Historic Places
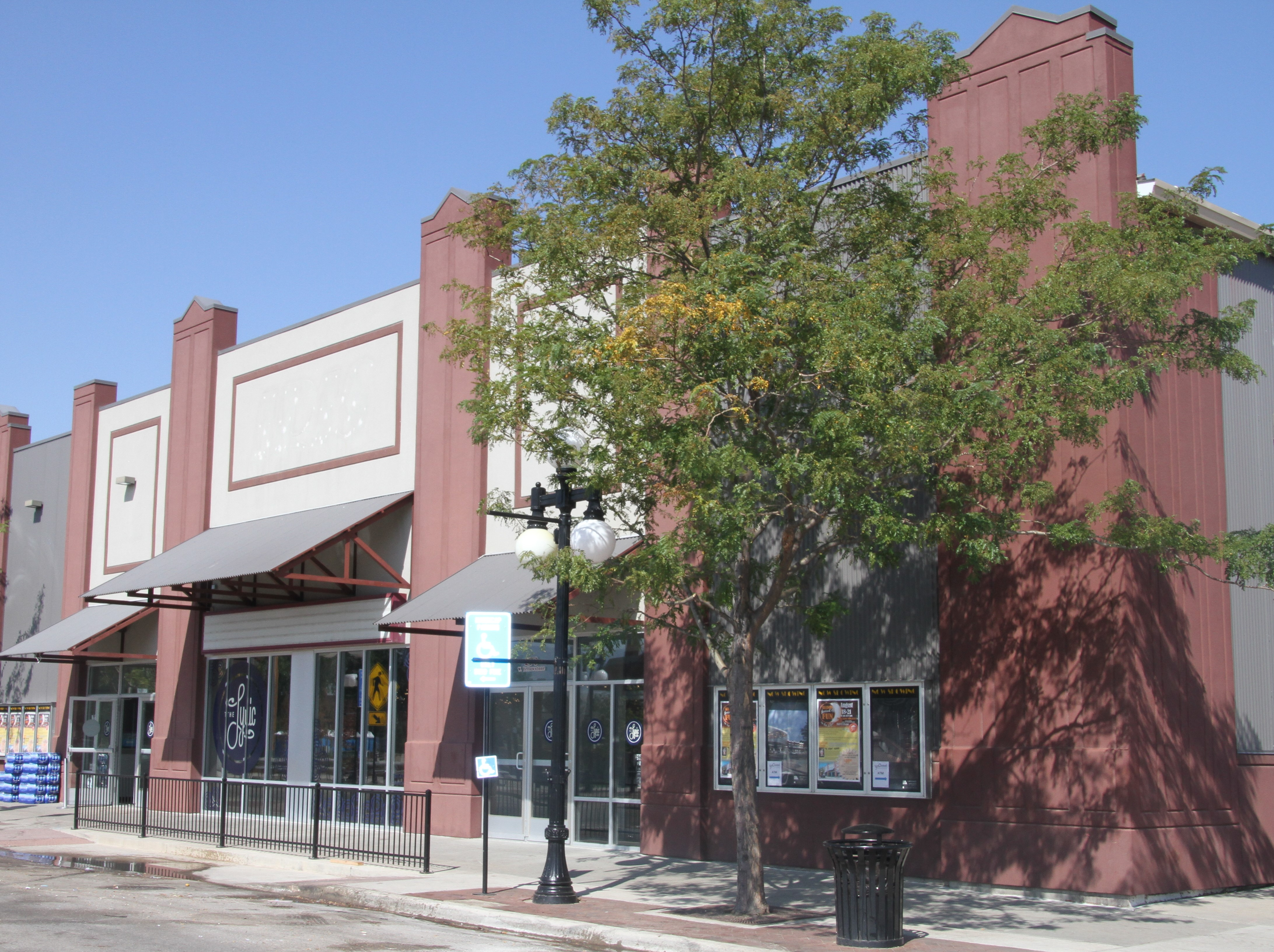

- Location within Wyoming
- Location: 230 W. Yellowstone Hwy., Casper, Wyoming
- Coordinates: 42°50′55″N 106°19′36″W
- Area: less than one acre
- Built: 1918
- Architectural style: Mission/spanish Revival
- NRHP reference No.: 94000042
- Added to NRHP: February 23, 1994

The Casper Motor Company-Natrona Motor Company is a historic building in Casper, Wyoming which was listed on the National Register of Historic Places in 1994. It eventually became the Iris Theater and then later, and currently as of 2018, The Lyric, an event venue.

It was built in 1918 in Mission Revival/Spanish Colonial Revival style, and is located at 230 West Yellowstone Highway.

It was built "by Albert Majors and Benjamin Mueller to house the Casper Auto Company, an auto showroom and garage run by B.B. Lummis."

It is a 100 by 114 feet (30 m × 35 m) two-story brick building.
