= Powder River, Wyoming =

Powder River
- Census-designated place
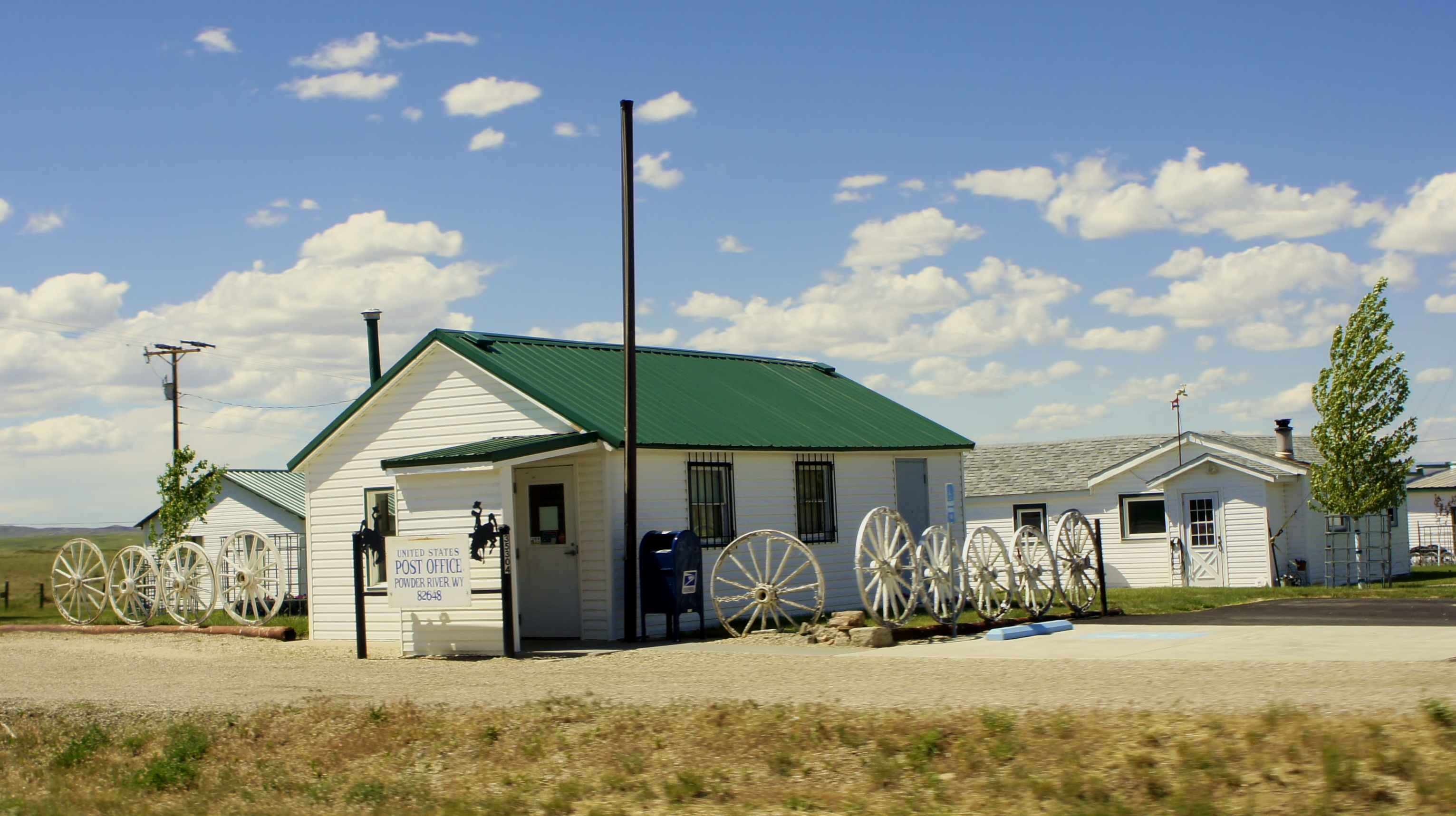
- Post Office in Powder River

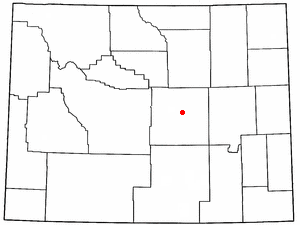
- Location of Powder River, Wyoming
- Coordinates: 43°02′50″N 107°00′06″W
- Country: United States
- State: Wyoming
- County: Natrona

Area
  - Total: 5.9 sq mi (15.4 km^{2})
  - Land: 5.9 sq mi (15.3 km^{2})
  - Water: 0.039 sq mi (0.1 km^{2})
- Elevation: 5,719 ft (1,743 m)

Population (2020)
  - Total: 30
  - Density: 5.1/sq mi (2.0/km^{2})
- Time zone: UTC-7 (Mountain (MST))
  - Summer (DST): UTC-6 (MDT)
- ZIP code: 82648
- Area code: 307
- FIPS code: 56-62305
- GNIS feature ID: 2409099

Powder River is a census-designated place (CDP) in Natrona County, Wyoming, United States. It is part of the Casper, Wyoming Metropolitan Statistical Area. The population was 30 in the 2020 census and 44 in the 2010 census.

== History ==
A post office called Powder River has been in operation since 1904. The community was named after the Powder River. A Chicago and Northwestern Railroad Depot built in 1910 still stands and was listed on the National Register of Historic Places in 1988.

== Geography ==
According to the United States Census Bureau, the CDP has a total area of 6.0 square miles (15.4 km^{2}), of which 5.9 square miles (15.3 km^{2}) is land and 0.1 square mile (0.1 km^{2}) (0.84%) is water.

=== Climate ===
Climate data for Powder River School, Wyoming, 1991–2020 normals, 1948-2020 records: 5722ft (1744m)
Month	Jan	Feb	Mar	Apr	May	Jun	Jul	Aug	Sep	Oct	Nov	Dec	Year
Record high °F (°C)	52 (11)	59 (15)	74 (23)	80 (27)	87 (31)	100 (38)	101 (38)	101 (38)	96 (36)	86 (30)	72 (22)	64 (18)	101 (38)
Mean maximum °F (°C)	47.3 (8.5)	49.4 (9.7)	65.0 (18.3)	74.3 (23.5)	81.8 (27.7)	92.8 (33.8)	97.3 (36.3)	95.6 (35.3)	92.4 (33.6)	78.6 (25.9)	65.9 (18.8)	51.8 (11.0)	96.1 (35.6)
Mean daily maximum °F (°C)	33.3 (0.7)	36.1 (2.3)	46.4 (8.0)	54.3 (12.4)	65.0 (18.3)	77.1 (25.1)	87.1 (30.6)	85.1 (29.5)	74.6 (23.7)	58.4 (14.7)	44.5 (6.9)	33.8 (1.0)	58.0 (14.4)
Daily mean °F (°C)	22.2 (−5.4)	23.9 (−4.5)	34.3 (1.3)	41.2 (5.1)	50.6 (10.3)	60.4 (15.8)	69.3 (20.7)	67.5 (19.7)	57.5 (14.2)	43.4 (6.3)	32.3 (0.2)	21.9 (−5.6)	43.7 (6.5)
Mean daily minimum °F (°C)	11.1 (−11.6)	11.7 (−11.3)	22.2 (−5.4)	28.1 (−2.2)	36.2 (2.3)	43.7 (6.5)	51.4 (10.8)	49.9 (9.9)	40.5 (4.7)	28.4 (−2.0)	20.1 (−6.6)	10.0 (−12.2)	29.4 (−1.4)
Mean minimum °F (°C)	−12.5 (−24.7)	−15.3 (−26.3)	−1.2 (−18.4)	10.4 (−12.0)	23.1 (−4.9)	34.9 (1.6)	41.6 (5.3)	38.5 (3.6)	28.5 (−1.9)	12.1 (−11.1)	−3.5 (−19.7)	−14.2 (−25.7)	−21.9 (−29.9)
Record low °F (°C)	−35 (−37)	−32 (−36)	−21 (−29)	−5 (−21)	17 (−8)	28 (−2)	33 (1)	31 (−1)	20 (−7)	−12 (−24)	−28 (−33)	−40 (−40)	−40 (−40)
Average precipitation inches (mm)	0.43 (11)	0.51 (13)	1.14 (29)	1.41 (36)	2.28 (58)	1.45 (37)	1.11 (28)	0.82 (21)	1.11 (28)	1.38 (35)	0.58 (15)	0.77 (20)	12.99 (331)
Average snowfall inches (cm)	5.9 (15)	9.4 (24)	10.4 (26)	9.6 (24)	3.2 (8.1)	trace	trace	trace	1.0 (2.5)	4.3 (11)	7.6 (19)	11.7 (30)	63.1 (159.6)
Average extreme snow depth inches (cm)	6 (15)	7 (18)	7 (18)	6 (15)	2 (5.1)	0 (0)	0 (0)	0 (0)	1 (2.5)	3 (7.6)	4 (10)	7 (18)	7 (18)
Average precipitation days (≥ 0.01 in)	3	4	4	5	7	4	4	3	3	4	4	5	50
Average snowy days (≥ 0.1 in)	4	4	4	4	1	0	0	0	0	2	3	5	27
Source 1: NOAA, (precip days, snow depth, snowy days 2010-2024)
Source 2: XMACIS2 (records, 2009-2023 monthly max/mins & snowfall)

Climate data for Powder River No.2, Wyoming, 1991–2020 normals, 1964-2020 records: 5700ft (1737m)
Month	Jan	Feb	Mar	Apr	May	Jun	Jul	Aug	Sep	Oct	Nov	Dec	Year
Record high °F (°C)	60 (16)	65 (18)	74 (23)	82 (28)	96 (36)	101 (38)	109 (43)	104 (40)	99 (37)	87 (31)	77 (25)	63 (17)	109 (43)
Mean maximum °F (°C)	50.5 (10.3)	53.6 (12.0)	65.4 (18.6)	75.1 (23.9)	82.6 (28.1)	92.6 (33.7)	98.3 (36.8)	95.5 (35.3)	89.1 (31.7)	76.3 (24.6)	61.6 (16.4)	50.6 (10.3)	97.5 (36.4)
Mean daily maximum °F (°C)	33.7 (0.9)	36.7 (2.6)	49.0 (9.4)	56.3 (13.5)	66.2 (19.0)	78.7 (25.9)	88.2 (31.2)	86.7 (30.4)	75.3 (24.1)	59.2 (15.1)	44.0 (6.7)	32.2 (0.1)	58.9 (14.9)
Daily mean °F (°C)	22.0 (−5.6)	25.0 (−3.9)	35.6 (2.0)	42.7 (5.9)	51.7 (10.9)	62.2 (16.8)	70.3 (21.3)	68.8 (20.4)	58.5 (14.7)	44.9 (7.2)	31.6 (−0.2)	21.5 (−5.8)	44.6 (7.0)
Mean daily minimum °F (°C)	10.2 (−12.1)	13.4 (−10.3)	22.1 (−5.5)	29.1 (−1.6)	37.3 (2.9)	45.6 (7.6)	52.3 (11.3)	50.9 (10.5)	41.8 (5.4)	30.6 (−0.8)	19.3 (−7.1)	10.8 (−11.8)	30.3 (−1.0)
Mean minimum °F (°C)	−10.8 (−23.8)	−10.3 (−23.5)	1.3 (−17.1)	13.4 (−10.3)	22.5 (−5.3)	33.7 (0.9)	40.1 (4.5)	38.6 (3.7)	26.7 (−2.9)	12.0 (−11.1)	−4.1 (−20.1)	−13.4 (−25.2)	−21.6 (−29.8)
Record low °F (°C)	−42 (−41)	−31 (−35)	−18 (−28)	−8 (−22)	12 (−11)	24 (−4)	30 (−1)	18 (−8)	10 (−12)	−5 (−21)	−29 (−34)	−45 (−43)	−45 (−43)
Average precipitation inches (mm)	0.26 (6.6)	0.38 (9.7)	0.69 (18)	0.99 (25)	2.05 (52)	1.48 (38)	0.96 (24)	0.68 (17)	1.09 (28)	1.02 (26)	0.54 (14)	0.29 (7.4)	10.43 (265.7)
Average snowfall inches (cm)	5.1 (13)	6.8 (17)	7.3 (19)	5.2 (13)	1.2 (3.0)	0.0 (0.0)	0.0 (0.0)	0.0 (0.0)	1.3 (3.3)	5.9 (15)	5.6 (14)	3.9 (9.9)	42.3 (107.2)
Source 1: NOAA (1981-2010 precip/snowfall)
Source 2: XMACIS2 (records & 1981-2010 monthly max/mins)

== Demographics ==
As of the census of 2000, there were 51 people, 24 households, and 13 families residing in the CDP. The population density was 8.6 people per square mile (3.3/km^{2}). There were 44 housing units at an average density of 7.4/sq mi (2.9/km^{2}). The racial makeup of the CDP was 100.00% White.

There were 24 households, out of which 20.8% had children under the age of 18 living with them, 54.2% were married couples living together, 4.2% had a female householder with no husband present, and 41.7% were non-families. 25.0% of all households were made up of individuals, and 12.5% had someone living alone who was 65 years of age or older. The average household size was 2.13 and the average family size was 2.64.

In the CDP, the population was spread out, with 17.6% under the age of 18, 5.9% from 18 to 24, 19.6% from 25 to 44, 39.2% from 45 to 64, and 17.6% who were 65 years of age or older. The median age was 50 years. For every 100 females, there were 104.0 males. For every 100 females age 18 and over, there were 121.1 males.

The median income for a household in the CDP was $40,804, and the median income for a family was $75,487. Males had a median income of $41,786 versus $13,750 for females. The per capita income for the CDP was $32,782. None of the population or the families were below the poverty line.
