= Rialto Theater (Casper, Wyoming) =

- U.S. National Register of Historic Places
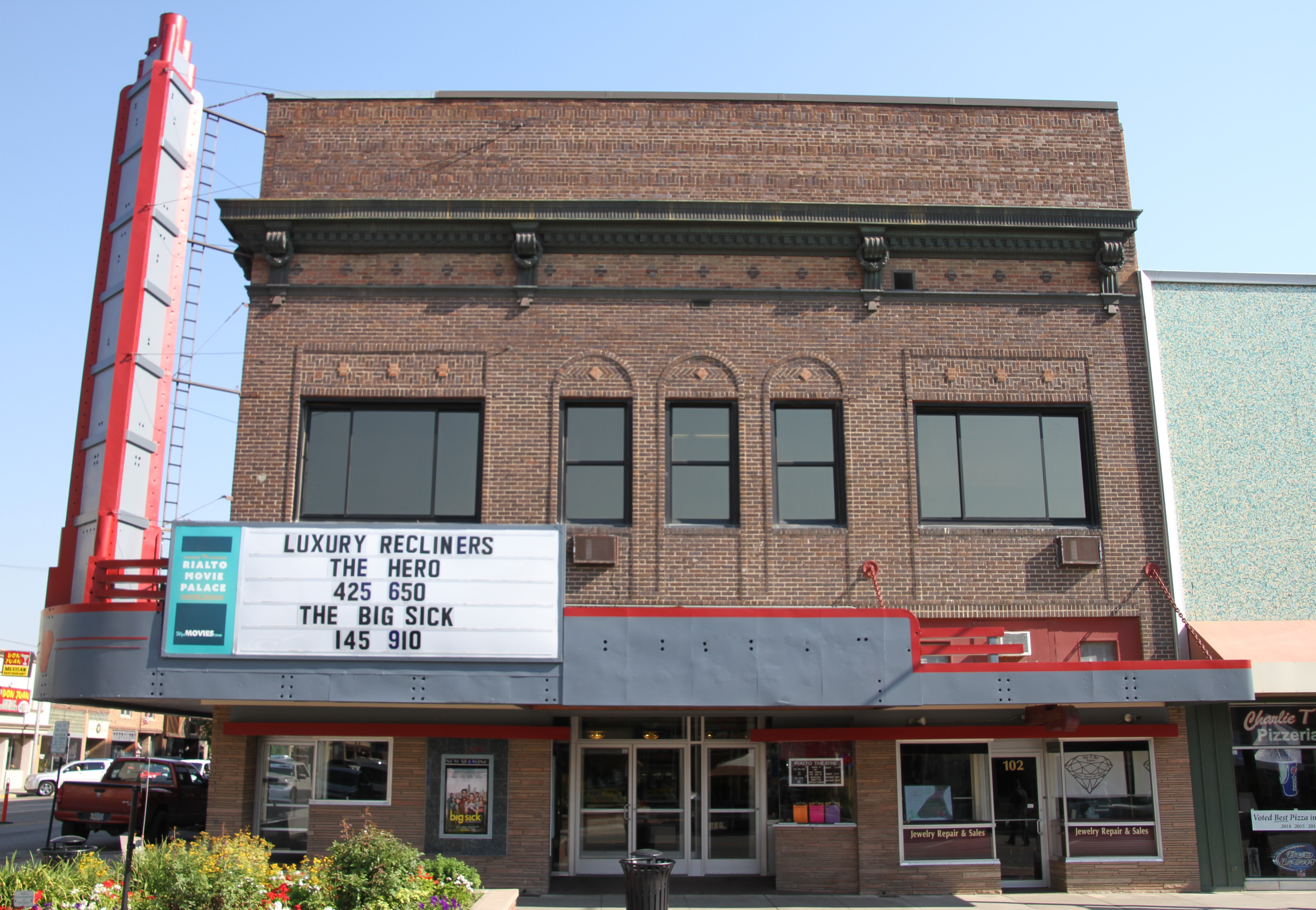
- The building in 2017

- Location within Wyoming Location within the United States
- Location: 102 East Second Street, Casper, Wyoming
- Coordinates: 42°50′56″N 106°19′29.9″W
- Built: 1921
- Architect: Dubois & Goodrich
- Architectural style: Chicago, Commercial Style
- NRHP reference No.: 93000037
- Added to NRHP: February 11, 1993

The Rialto Theater (originally the New Lyric Theater) is a former movie theater in Casper, Wyoming built in 1921. It was constructed with 800 seats by Henry Brennan, who had a successful Vaudeville house, on which he based the new cinema. He sold the building in 1922 to E.J. Schulte, a Schulte invested $50,000 in a remodeling project designed by Casper architects William Dubois and Leon Goodrich. The reopening featured the William C. deMille movie titled Nice People, a silent film that was accompanied by the Chicago Netto Ladies Orchestra. In 1928, the Rialto began to show talkies. The theater was added to the National Register of Historic Places in 1993.

The Rialto measures 50 feet (15 m) by 100 feet (30 m) on a prominent corner site. The brick facade is plain in form but the brickwork is extensively detailed. A tall neon sign marks the corner, replacing the original metal sign, and a marquee was added, covering the original leaded glass transoms over the storefronts. A tall parapet adds to the apparent mass of the theater. Storefronts on both frontages house retail shops. On the interior, a balcony is reached by two curving stairs on either side of the lobby, replacing a single grand stair from the first design.

The Rialto was sold in 2023 and re-opened as an event venue in the summer of 2024. It hosts ticketed and private events with a focus on stand-up comedy, music, and family-friendly events. Current ownership is marketing the venue in a partnership with the other downtown venues, including the America theater, which is expected to re-open in 2025.
