= Hiland, Wyoming =

- Unincorporated community
- Location within the state of Wyoming Hiland, Wyoming (the United States)
- Coordinates: 43°06′55″N 107°20′56″W
- Country: United States
- State: Wyoming
- County: Natrona
- Elevation: 6,004 ft (1,830 m)
- Time zone: UTC-7 (Mountain (MST))
  - Summer (DST): UTC-6 (MDT)
- ZIP codes: 82638
- GNIS feature ID: 1609103

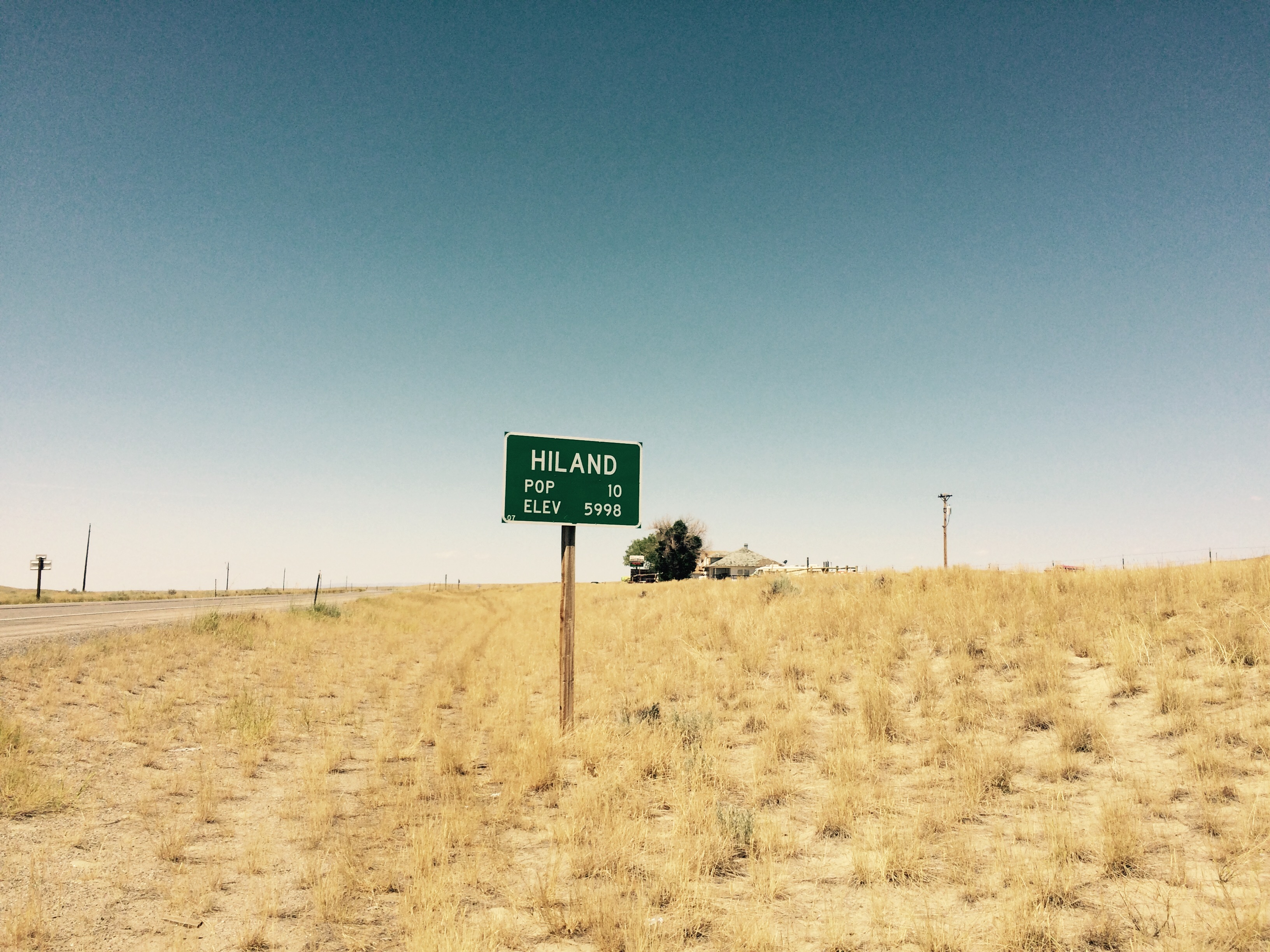
Hiland in 2016

Hiland (also Poison Creek Station, Woolton, or Wolton) is an unincorporated community in western Natrona County, Wyoming, United States. Hiland has an estimated population of 12.

Hiland is located along the concurrent U.S. Routes 20 and 26, northwest of Casper, the county seat of Natrona County. It is about 240 miles (386 kilometers) from Yellowstone National Park via the scenic Wind River Canyon and the Wind River Indian Reservation, passing near the town of Thermopolis.

Although the Hiland post office closed in 2014, it retains a ZIP code of 82638. The nearest high school is Natrona County High School, located in Casper.

== History ==
Hiland is so named because it was the highest point on the Wyoming portion of the Chicago and North Western Railway. Originally established as Woolton, the community later adopted the spelling Wolton before being renamed Hiland in 1914. The name change followed the relocation of most residents to Arminto, the new nearby railhead. As of 2016, the town consisted of a general store with an attached bar popular with bikers, an adjacent house, and a small motel with a row of rooms. About 200 yards from the buildings, there is a small cemetery where Hiland's earliest residents are buried.

== Climate ==
According to the Koppen Climate Classification system, Hiland has a semi-arid climate (Köppen BSk), characterized by cold, dry winters and warm summers. Due to its elevation and central Wyoming location, Hiland experiences significant temperature fluctuations between day and night. Based on climate data from nearby locations, temperatures in Hiland remain below 50°F for approximately 200 days per year. Precipitation remains low throughout the year, with occasional snowfall in winter and thunderstorms in the warmer months. The combination of elevation and aridity contributes to the wide daily temperature swings common in the region.

== The Bright Spot ==
In 1923, Robert A. "Dad" Smith opened a general store and lunch counter in Hiland, and named it The Bright Spot. It was one of the few places with electricity along the highway, making it a landmark in the region. The Bright Spot served as a key stop for travelers going from Casper to Yellowstone. It was particularly famous for its "Sagebrush Ham" sandwiches, which became popular with locals and tourists. Betty Evenson, Smith’s daughter, told the history of The Bright Spot in her 1990 book, 50 Years at the Bright Spot, which describes the resilience and community spirit of rural Wyoming. After Betty’s death, the Bright Spot changed ownership and is now known as Steelman’s Bright Spot.

== Notable people ==
Betty Evenson (1910-1997) managed The Bright Spot for several decades, maintaining it as a hub for travelers and locals alike. In 1990, she wrote 50 Years at the Bright Spot, telling its story and the story of life in rural Wyoming. Evenson was also an accomplished writer of romance novels and confession stories, drawing inspiration from the people she met at The Bright Spot. Her writing captured the essence of life on the Wyoming plains. Betty, her husband Maurice, “Dad” Smith and Betty’s mother, Etta, are buried in the small cemetery behind Hiland.

Major General C. Rodney Smith (1902–1999), “Dad” Smith’s only son, was a career Army officer who graduated from the United States Military Academy in 1926. He had a distinguished 31-year career, rising to the rank of Major General, and retiring as the Deputy Chief of Engineers of the Corps of Engineers. After his military service, he became the executive director of Radio Free Europe, where he played a key role in building its reputation and influence during the Cold War. He died in 1999 at the age of 97 and is buried at West Point.
