= Powder River station =

- Chicago and Northwestern Railroad Depot
- U.S. National Register of Historic Places
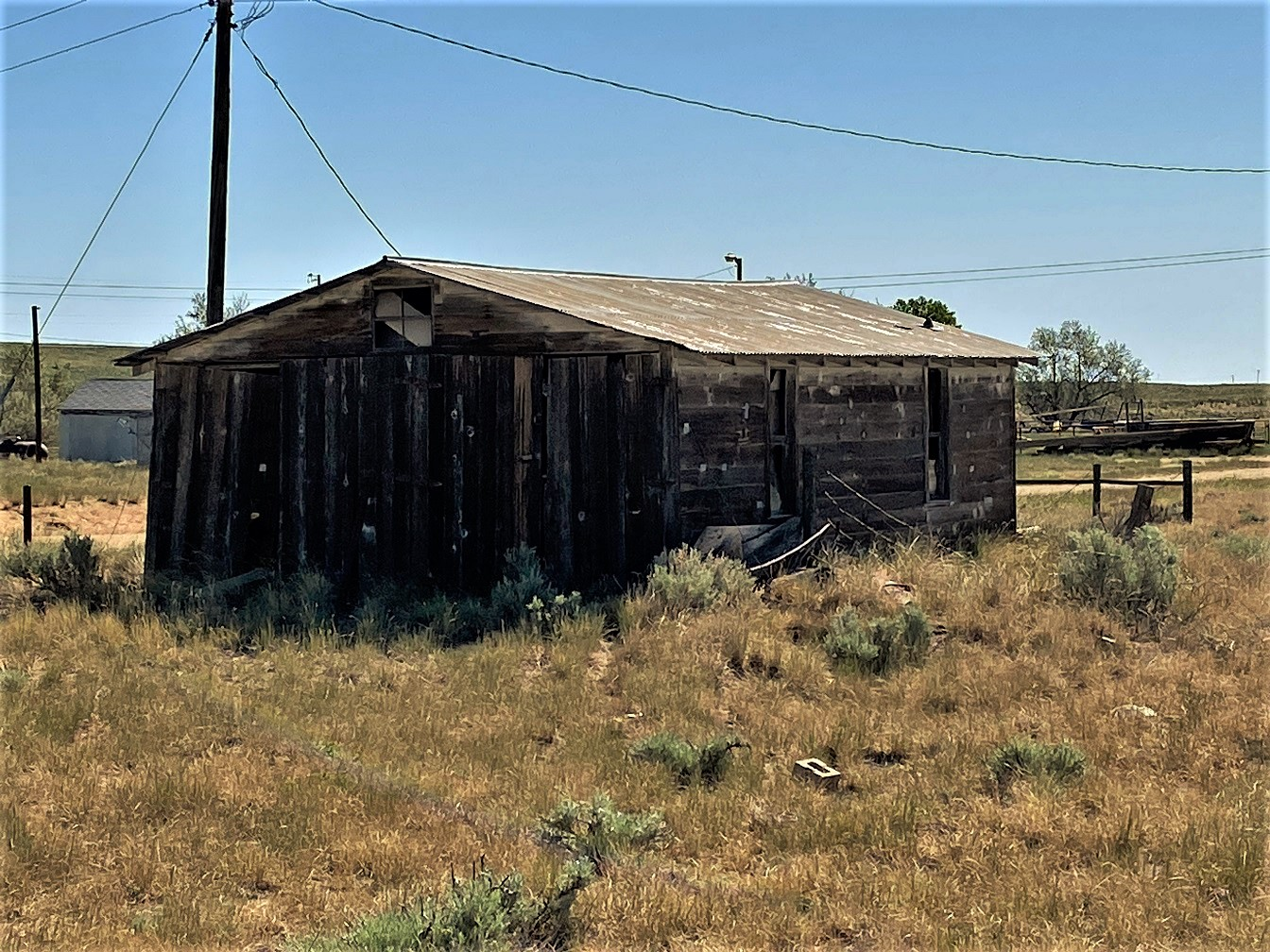
- The shed is all that remains on the property

- Location within Wyoming
- Location: 35231 W. Dakota Ave. Powder River, Wyoming
- Coordinates: 43°02′04″N 106°59′10″W
- Area: 0.7 acres (0.28 ha)
- Built: 1910
- Built by: Chicago & Northwestern Railroad
- NRHP reference No.: 87002296
- Added to NRHP: January 7, 1988

The Chicago and Northwestern Railroad Depot in Powder River, Wyoming, also known as Powder River Train Station, was built in 1910. It was listed on the National Register of Historic Places in 1988.

It was one of only two stations built by the Chicago & Northwestern Railroad in all of Natrona County, the other being a brick structure in Casper.

Preceding station	Chicago and North Western Railway	Following station
Waltman toward Lander	Fremont, Elkhorn and Missouri Valley Railroad; Main Line	Bucknum toward Omaha
