= Siege of the TA Ranch =

1892 siege that happened during the Johnson County War

Coordinates: 44.1546°N 106.6869°W

- Part of Johnson County War
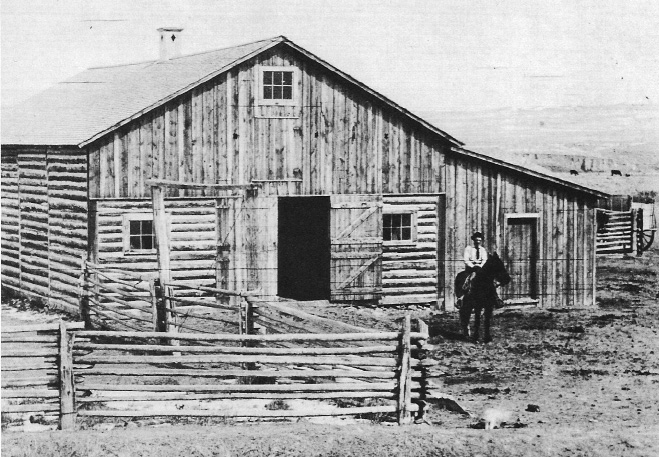
- Picture of the TA Ranch taken in 1904, twelve years after the siege.
Date	April 11–13, 1892
Location	Johnson County, Wyoming
Result	Inconclusive

Belligerents
Cattle barons	Homesteaders

Commanders and leaders
Frank Wolcott; Frank M. Canton	William "Red" Angus

Strength
50 total (23 were hired Texas gunmen)	200

Casualties and losses
2–5 men killed.	None

The siege of the TA Ranch was a siege and the climax of the Johnson County War, which happened on April 11–13, 1892, in the TA Ranch in Johnson County, Wyoming. The battle was fought between a group of cattle barons and their hired guns, who were trapped in the TA Ranch, and a posse of homesteaders and local lawmen who had besieged them, after the latter killed a prominent cowboy and his friend. The siege became a pivotal moment in the war, and was depicted in a number of books, films, and documentaries over the years.

== Background ==
The Johnson County War was a range war that occurred in the years 1889–1893. The war was fought between the large ranchers (known as "cattle barons") and the homesteaders (known as "nesters" or "grangers"), both of whom competed for the limited land, water, and cattle in the Wyoming range. Much of the war was fought in Johnson County, in areas such as Powder River, Buffalo, and other neighboring communities. A harsh winter in 1886-1887 ravaged the state, prompting the cattle barons, many of whom had formed companies headquartered in the Cheyenne Club, to try to monopolize the limited resources and livestock for their outfits. This, however, was challenged by homesteaders consisting of smaller, more independent farmers and ranchers, who had also settled in the area and were using the resources on the range.

The dispute became a conflict when the cattle barons began persecuting many homesteaders, whom they believed were stealing from their outfits (known as "rustling"). They put the law into their own hands and began a campaign of lynching and assassinating suspected thieves and competition. The cattle barons were led by prominent ranchers and politicians like Frank Wolcott, Frank M. Canton, and Governor Amos W. Barber. To protect themselves and their livelihood, the homesteaders united limitedly under the leadership of cowboy and rancher Nate Champion, and sheriff and former Indian War veteran William "Red" Angus.

In a mighty effort to finally stop the homesteaders, the cattle barons began hiring 23 gunmen from Texas to blitz and exterminate their opposition, in a similar vein to the Stuart Stranglers led by Granville Stuart in Montana. The gunmen, nicknamed the "Invaders", were led by Wolcott, Canton, and allegedly by infamous hitman Tom Horn. On April 8, 1892, they killed Nate Champion and his friend Nick Ray at the KC Ranch. They then targeted another nester named Jack Flagg, but Flagg managed to escape and warn Sheriff Angus and the town of Buffalo of the Invaders. Sheriff Angus then formed a posse of 200 people and set out to KC Ranch, before heading out to the TA Ranch, where the Invaders were last spotted.

== Siege ==
The first casualty of the battle was gunman Jim Dudley. During their flight to TA Ranch, Dudley's horse, who was bearing much of the weight of the fat gunman, bucked and attempted to get Dudley off. Dudley's rifle fell and accidentally discharged, hitting the gunman in the knee. He was then escorted by two others to Fort McKinney where he died two days later. Upon entering the ranch, the Invaders took their positions. When the posse arrived, they fired at them through windows, doors, and self-made gunports on the wall. The posse fired back, kicking off a siege that would last three days. Many of the members of the posse were Civil War veterans who had knowledge of conducting a proper siege, including John R. Smith who was a former member of the Indiana Volunteers and a leader of the Northern Wyoming Farmers and Stock Growers' Association.

The posse surrounded the ranch, shot dead the Invaders's horses and any roaming cattle, and built trenches and pits. They were well-equipped with new firearms and ammunition courtesy of Robert Foote, who had distributed them for free from his store. One of the guns used was a large-caliber muzzle-loading rifle that was said to be powerful enough to punch through the walls of the ranch. The Invaders incurred another loss: Alex Lowther, who was mortally wounded in the abdomen. The Invaders stated that he accidentally shot himself during the fight. But this claim was disputed by historian John W. Davis, who believed that the cattle barons were attempting to minimize the humiliation of their defeat. Like Dudley, Lowther died at Fort McKinney a month later on May 12.

One of the stockmen noted a 16-year-old TA ranch worker who was hit during the siege. Forced to hole up inside the ranch with the Invaders, the boy desired to participate in the battle and tried to borrow a firearm. Although he was refused, the boy managed to find an old shotgun while scrounging up various junk inside the loft. However, while cleaning the shotgun, a bullet went through a window and wounded him in the neck. He ended up laying in a corner and sitting out the whole fight. It was generally unknown whether he survived the battle or not. The New York Times also reported that twenty Invaders tried to escape behind a fusillade, but the posse beat them back and killed three to five. None of the besiegers was hit besides a few near misses. A cowboy named Jumbo McKenzie had his horse shot from under him by an Invader, while Deputy Sheriff Howard Roles had his coat shot through by range detective Joe Elliott.

It wasn't long before one of the cattle barons became a casualty; Billy Irvine lost a big toe when a wild bullet from the homesteaders penetrated the ranch. With the situation becoming desperate, one of the Invaders, Mike Shonsey, managed to slip out and run to get help. At that time, the posse tried to break the stalemate. They first attempted to borrow a cannon from nearby Fort McKinney but was rejected. A blacksmith named Rap Brown tried to make his own cannon but it blew up. Nonetheless, he made a large bullet resistant wagon called the "Ark of Safety", which would hopefully allow a select group of homesteaders to get close and chuck dynamite at the ranch. Before that could happen, Mike Shonsey finally telegraphed their allies in the government. The telegram read:

About sixty-one owners of live stock are reported to have made an armed expedition into Johnson County for the purpose of protecting their live stock and preventing unlawful roundups by rustlers. They are at 'T.A.' Ranch, thirteen miles from Fort McKinney, and are besieged by Sheriff and posse and by rustlers from that section of the country, said to be two or three hundred in number. The wagons of stockmen were captured and taken away from them and it is reported a battle took place yesterday, during which a number of men were killed. Great excitement prevails. Both parties are very determined and it is feared that if successful will show no mercy to the persons captured. The civil authorities are unable to prevent violence. The situation is serious and immediate assistance will probably prevent great loss of life.

Governor Barber and President Benjamin Harrison sent the 6th Cavalry from Fort McKinney, led by Colonel J.J. Van Horn, to stop the siege. The cavalry negotiated with Angus, and took custody of Wolcott and the Invaders, ending the battle.

== Aftermath ==
The Invaders and the homesteaders went through a long and lengthy persecution, which ended favorably for the former. Skirmishes continued until 1893, but many of the cattle barons left the area and never bothered the homesteaders again.

== In other media ==
The siege was depicted in many literature, films, shows, and even a song about the Johnson County War. It was first recorded in a book by Asa Mercer entitled The Banditti of the Plains. It was then depicted in the 1980 movie Heaven's Gate, and in documentaries like History Channel's Vendettas and American Heroes Channel's Blood Feuds. Singer Chris LeDoux also mentioned the siege in the song "Johnson County War" in 1989.
