= Frank M. Canton =

Fugitive and US marshal

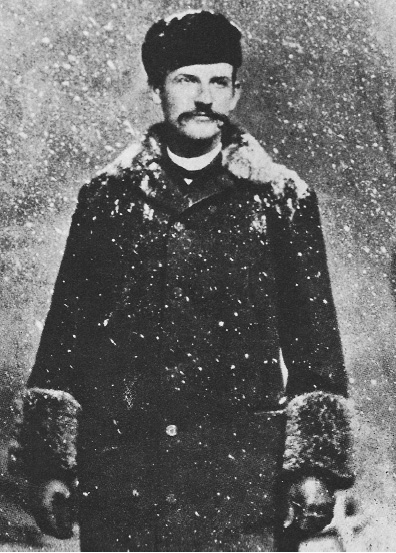
- Frank Canton

1st Adjutant General of Oklahoma
- In office November 16, 1907 – June 30, 1916
- Governor: Charles Haskell; Lee Cruce; Robert L. Williams
- Preceded by: Alva J. Niles (as last territorial Adjutant General)
- Succeeded by: Ancel S. Earp

Personal details
- Born: Josiah Horner; September 15, 1849 Harrison Township, Indiana, U.S.
- Died: September 27, 1927 (aged 78) Edmond, Oklahoma, U.S.

Frank M. Canton (born Josiah Horner, September 15, 1849 – September 27, 1927) was an American Old West fugitive who had a career as a Deputy U.S. Marshal under an assumed name. Although an ex-Sheriff and Stock Detective in Wyoming, Canton and his associates were accused of allegedly operating more by assassination than the law. Extrajudicial measures such as the lynching of Ellen Watson inflamed public opinion against the long-established the big ranchers Canton worked for. To re-establish control over grazing the big ranchers funded an all-out assault on those small operators considered to be rustlers. Canton directed Frank Wolcott's hired gunslingers in their planned vigilante campaign, known as the Johnson County War, which was quickly ended by a local posse. Finding himself a marked man in Wyoming, Canton considered it opportune to leave the state. He spent most of the rest of his working life in law enforcement for the court of hanging judge Isaac C. Parker.

== Biography ==
=== Early life ===
Josiah Horner was born on September 15, 1849, in Harrison Township, Henry County, Indiana, though Canton in his own autobiography, "Frontier Trails" admitted he was born in Virginia; about 15 miles from Richmond. He had previously ran away from home to try to join the Union Army, briefly serving as an orderly, before working at Fort Leavenworth, Kansas. Accused of manslaughter, he was narrowly acquitted and left for new pastures. He began operating with Christopher Carter's cow hands in Jack County, Texas, and as a member of the Jack County Minutemen, a militia outfit. He also went on a large scale cattle drive in 1868 with Samuel Burk Burnett to Abilene, Kansas and joined another one to Nebraska soon after.

In early 1874, he started robbing banks and rustling cattle in a small gang, which at the time was a capital offense. The gang became known as the Horner-Cotnam Gang, which included his friend William Cotnam and young Horace Jefferies, aka Henry Jones. After stealing a safe, they were tracked by U.S Army Scout Henry Strong and Deputy Sheriff Wile Lovejoy. Horner later faced trial and arrest, suspended for a time.

On October 9 or 10, 1874, Horner got into a 3pm gunfight with some Buffalo Soldiers near Fort Richardson, killing one and wounding the other, one George Smith. aided by friend Joe Watson. He was acquitted due to a string of sympathetic local witnesses who helped rule for self defence, but with a hefty bail and trial set for the next year. He was sent to Graham, TX Jail until being broken out by four men in spring 1875; forming a new gang of thieves in the northern counties of Texas. In 1877, he was arrested for robbing a bank in Comanche, Texas. On August 4, 1879, he escaped from Texas Ranger custody and fled to Ogallala, Nebraska, and took up ranching under the alias Frank M. Canton.

=== Johnson County War ===
Frank Canton was hired on as a Range \ Stock Detective for the Wyoming Stock Growers Association at a time of escalating tension between the wealthy cattlemen, rustlers and the burgeoning population of homesteading incomers who were, by sheer numbers, putting an end to "free ranging", and altering the balance of political power. Elected Sheriff of Johnson County, Wyoming in 1885, he was seen as a strong right hand of the cattle barons. The tone of a letter from the Pinkerton Detective Agency recommending Tom Horn to Canton confirms that he took a very hard line against rustling suspects. He served for four years, but resigned after the foreman of one of the big ranches suspiciously escaped his custody. Although still working part-time as a Deputy U.S. Marshal, rumours circulated he was as much paid assassin and intimidator as detective. The unsolved shooting death of a law abiding homesteader, who had said Canton threatened his life because he had evidence against Canton's friends as culprits in an earlier murder, made him distrusted by the homesteading faction. With a mob forming, Canton was arrested, but several big ranchers stood surety for him and his lawyer got him released, whereupon he left the state. By the time further evidence against him was found he was in Illinois and the matter was dropped.

During the Johnson County War, Canton returned as local guide for Frank Wolcott's largely Texan hired guns who were to execute a death list of alleged rustlers Canton had drawn up. On April 9, 1892, Canton led the so-called Regulators to the "KC Ranch", where their number one targets Nate Champion, a witness against some of Canton's friends for a murder, and Nick Ray were staying. Ray was shot and killed in the opening minutes of the ensuing gun battle. Champion killed at least four of the Regulators and wounded others. At 5:00 p.m., Canton set the house on fire. Champion burst out of the house firing his Winchester Rifle and was shot 28 times. Two days later a huge posse, led by Sheriff Angus surrounded the Regulators at the "TA Ranch" and only the U.S. Cavalry's arrival rescued Canton and his companions from having to surrender. With the newspapers portraying them in a favourable light due to the influence of powerful ranching interests, Canton, like the other regulators, was freed. He again left, putting several hundred miles between him and Wyoming, this time for good.

== Life in Oklahoma ==
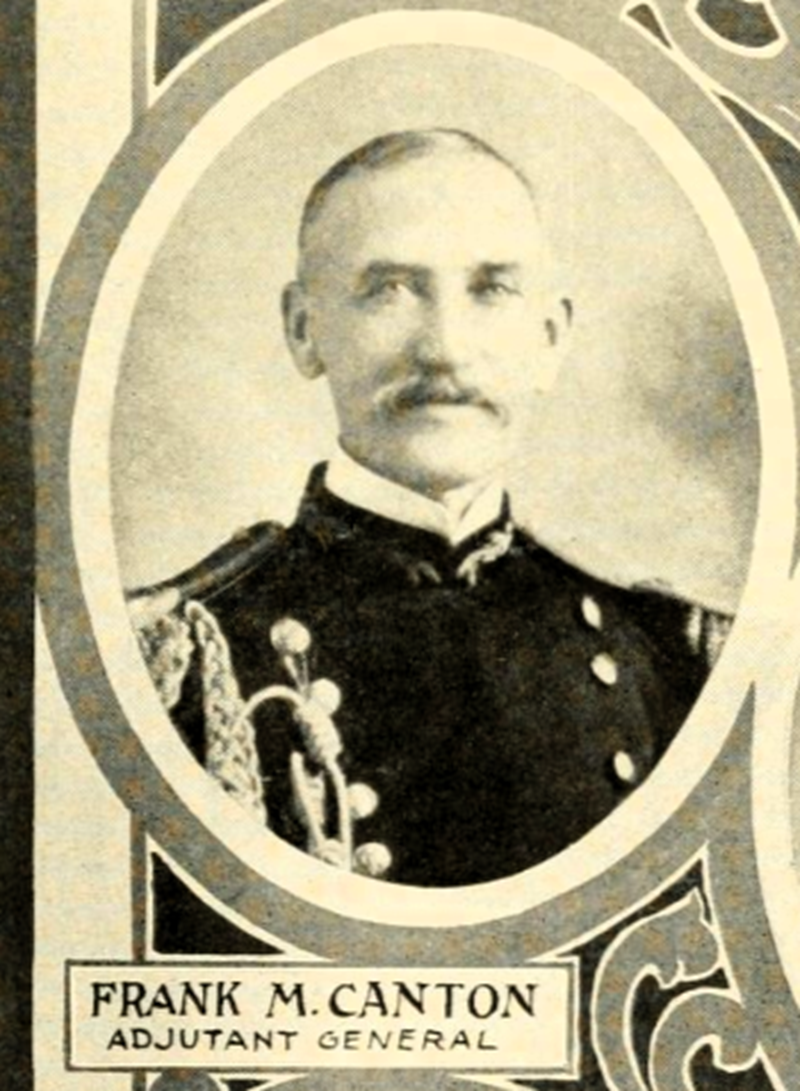
Frank M. Canton as Oklahoma Adjutant General

Continuing in law enforcement, Canton traveled to what is now Oklahoma, and as a Deputy U.S. Marshal based out of Fort Smith, Arkansas, he worked with other famous lawmen such as Heck Thomas, Chris Madsen, Bass Reeves and Bill Tilghman in the Oklahoma Territory and Indian Territory. In 1895, Canton joined a posse that tracked down Bill and John Shelley, who had escaped from the Pawnee jail and barricaded themselves in a cabin across the Arkansas River. After 5 hours and more than 800 shots fired, Canton sent a burning wagon into the cabin, and the outlaws surrendered.

=== Shootout with Bill Dunn ===
On November 6, 1896, in Pawnee, Oklahoma Territory, Canton shot dead Bill Dunn in the street. As Canton told it, Dunn said "Damn you, Canton. I've got it in for you!" before reaching for his pistol, which got caught in his suspenders while Canton drew and fired hitting Dunn in the head, killing him instantly. The one-on-one shootout became one of few examples of an incident resembling a Western film-style fast draw shooting actually occurring. The local law enforcement that Canton worked with ruled it as a case of self-defense.

=== Later life ===
In 1897, Canton went to Alaska to follow the gold rush, but his work as a Deputy U.S. Marshal ended in disputed circumstances with assertions he had misused public money. He returned to the Continental U.S. in 1907 and became Adjutant General for the Oklahoma National Guard. Canton confessed that he was Horner, and the Governor of Texas granted him a pardon.

=== End of life ===
By 1925, age had visibly overtaken Canton. He had grown bald, his vision was impaired and light-sensitive and he had almost completely lost his hearing. Unable to perform as a cattleman or a lawman, he was then unemployed. The Texas Cattlemen's Association awarded him a small pension. His unmarried adult daughter, Ruby, helped support Canton and his wife, Annie, who moved into Ruby's home. On September 1, 1927, he could not get out of bed, so Ruby summoned a doctor. After examining the patient, the doctor announced that he had terminal cancer and would have to remain in bed, since he had only a few days to live. On September 15, the family celebrated his seventy-eighth birthday at Ruby's home. Canton died on September 27, 1927, in Edmond, Oklahoma.

== Dramatic representations ==
- Canton is played by Sam Waterston in Heaven's Gate (1980). He is portrayed, however, as a senior cattle baron, rather than a detective and lawman living in 1890.
- Canton is the basis for Jesse Jacklin in the 2002 television movie Johnson County War.
- Canton, played by Ed Nelson, is a guest character in the "What Happened at the XST?" episode (1972) of Alias Smith and Jones.
- After his death, Canton was proposed as Owen Wister's direct inspiration for "The Virginian," though Wister's journals did not support that claim.

== Bibliography ==
- Canton, Frank M., (1930). - Frontier Trails: The Autobiography of Frank M. Canton. - Edited by Edward Everett Dale. - Boston, New York: Houghton Mifflin. - 191328781.
  Reprint: 1966. - Norman, Oklahoma: University of Oklahoma Press. - 8206819.
- DeArment, Robert K. (1996), Alias Frank Canton. Norman, OK: University of Oklahoma Press.ISBN 0-8061-2828-3

Police appointments
Preceded by Nat James	Sheriff of Johnson County, Wyoming; 1881–1882	Succeeded by William G. "Red" Angus
