= Kevin's Gate =

The humorous epithet "Kevin's Gate" (named after the film Heaven's Gate) has been applied to two films by Kevin Costner:

- Dances with Wolves
- Waterworld

Waterworld also earned another epithet, “Fishtar,” as a reference to the Hollywood flop “Ishtar,” an expensive and underwhelming film that starred Warren Beatty and Dustin Hoffman.
