= William Angus (lawman) =

American sheriff during the Johnson County War

- Born: November 9, 1849; Zanesville, Ohio
- Died: c. 1922; Buffalo, Wyoming
- Occupation: Lawman
- Known for: Sheriff during the Johnson County War

William "Red" Angus (born November 9, 1849 – c. 1922) was a former soldier and sheriff in Wyoming who became a principal leader and combatant during the infamous Johnson County War.

== Early life ==
William Angus was born on Zanesville, Ohio on November 9, 1849. His childhood and family history had largely been undocumented. He began a career in the military, first as a military teamster, and then as a member of the Kansas Volunteer Cavalry. He participated in the Battle of the Washita under General George Custer against Black Kettle.

Afterwards, he retired from the army and continued work as a teamster, wagon driver, and even worked as a cowboy who herded cattle from Texas to Wyoming in 1880. He soon decided to stay in Wyoming, where he opened a bar. In 1886, he was elected as sheriff of Johnson County.

== Johnson County War ==
A range war erupted in Johnson County between the large cattle ranchers and the small ranchers or homesteaders. Both parties competed and fought for livestock, as well as the grass and water needed to grow said livestock. The war became the sight of lynchings, assassinations by hired guns of wealthy cattle barons, and a few larger gun battles. At that time, local politicians participated in the conflict. Sheriff Red Angus sided with the homesteaders, who he believed were being preyed upon by the cattle barons and large ranchers.

Angus became the leader during the climactic battle of the Johnson County War – the Siege of the TA Ranch. A large group of cattle barons and their hired gunmen murdered a prominent leader of the homesteaders, Nate Champion, on April 8, 1892. When he heard this, Angus called upon the people of the nearby town of Buffalo and formed a posse numbering 200. They caught the cattle barons in TA Ranch, who numbered somewhere around 50 men.

Angus, a former soldier, together with a few Civil War veterans, conducted a formidable siege. They surrounded the barn house, killed the invader's horses, and built pits and trenches. Their siege caused a number of casualties on the cattle barons' side, before it was stopped by the arrival of the 6th cavalry from Fort McKinney. The officer-in-charge, Colonel J.J. Van Horn, negotiated with Angus to allow them custody of the cattle barons and their gunmen in exchange for a proper trial. In the end, none of the cattle barons or their hired gunmen were held to account for the killings.

== Later years ==
Angus ran again for sheriff in 1893 but lost. Nonetheless, he stayed in Buffalo, where he worked at the Occidental Hotel and served as a Deputy County Clerk and Johnson County Treasurer. He also ran a ranch in Kaycee, Wyoming. He died of natural causes somewhere in 1922.
