= James L. Berkey =

American set decorator

- Born: April 10, 1930
- Died: July 3, 1982 (aged 52)
- Occupation: Set decorator
- Years active: 1958–1982

James Lysander Berkey (April 10, 1930 – July 3, 1982) was an American set decorator. He was nominated for an Academy Award in the category Best Art Direction for the film Heaven's Gate.

== Selected filmography ==
| Year | Film | Director |
|---|---|---|
| 1967 | The Love-Ins | Arthur Dreifuss |
| 1969 | Paint Your Wagon | Joshua Logan |
| 1970 | The Hawaiians | Tom Gries |
| 1972 | The Man | Joseph Sargent |
| 1974 | Thunderbolt and Lightfoot | Michael Cimino |
| 1976 | Bound for Glory | Hal Ashby |
| 1977 | The Island of Dr. Moreau | Don Taylor |
| 1978 | Grease | Randal Kleiser |
| 1980 | Heaven's Gate | Michael Cimino |
| 1981 | Modern Romance | Albert Brooks |
| 1981 | Hard Country | L. David Syms-Greene |
| 1982 | An Officer and a Gentleman | Taylor E. Hackford |
| 1982 | Kiss Me Goodbye | Robert Mulligan |
