= TA Ranch Historic District =

Historic district in Wyoming, United States

- U.S. National Register of Historic Places
- U.S. Historic district
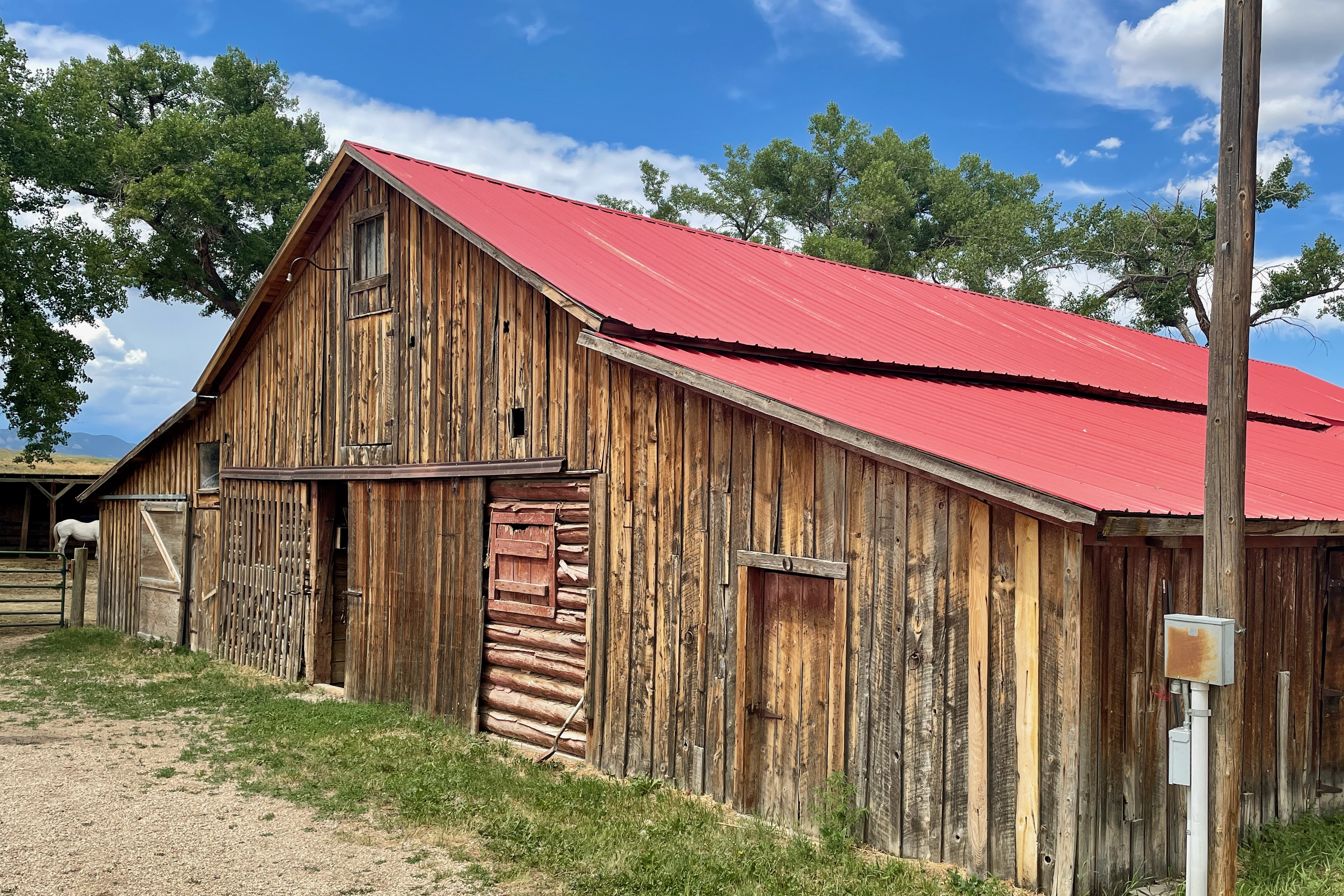
- Barn at the TA Ranch

- Location within Wyoming Location within the United States
- Location: Johnson County, Wyoming, USA
- Nearest city: Buffalo, Wyoming
- Coordinates: 44°9′18″N 106°40′13″W
- Built: 1892
- NRHP reference No.: 93000198
- Added to NRHP: March 26, 1993

The TA Ranch was the site of the principal events of the Johnson County Range War in 1892. The TA was established in 1882 as one of the first ranches in Johnson County, Wyoming. The TA is the only intact site associated with the range war, with trenches used by both sides still visible and scars on the nearby buildings. The ranch also documents the expansion and development of cattle ranching in Wyoming.

== Description ==
The ranch is located near the North Branch of Crazy Woman Creek south of Buffalo, Wyoming, with the Big Horn Mountains to the west. The property is significant for its role as the scene of a three-day siege in the Johnson County Range War, and as an example of an intact ranching operation.

Significant buildings include:

- Barn: A log-and-frame building built in 1882 and expanded in 1904. The barn was originally 60 feet (18 m) by 40 feet (12 m), expanded to 75 feet (23 m) by 60 feet (18 m) in 1904. The barn was the chief venue in the 1892 shootout and preserves gunports cut in the upper north and south walls during the battle.
- Ranch House: Also built in 1892, the one story log ranch house features logs sawn with a circular saw and nailed into vertical corner logs. Even interior partitions are log. The major rooms have outside doors on the south side, for a total of five doors, a result of the unusual plan with no internal hallway. Rooms have 9-foot (2.7 m) ceilings, and the living room and western bedroom have tongue and groove wainscoting. A partial basement excavated in 1910 houses a boiler. The house was also involved in the gunfight and retains bullet scars.
- Root Cellar: A large 25-foot (7.6 m) by 35 feet (11 m) root cellar was built in 1882.
- Cook House: The L-shaped log cookhouse was built in 1904 in two phases.
- Milk Barn: The log milk barn was built in 1915.
- Meat House:The 16-foot (4.9 m) by 16-foot (4.9 m) meat house was also built in 1915 of logs.
- Hog House:The 1915 log hog house was divided between hog pens and a room for processing and cutting pork and hides.
- Cattle Shed: The open-faced cattle shed was built in 1915 with board and batten walls and a corrugated metal roof.

Other contributing structures include a granary, a garage, outhouses and a hen house.

Of particular note are the bunkers or breastworks built during the 1892 siege. The cattlemen's hired guns dug trenches on an elevated location to the west of the barn that commanded a view of the surrounding country. The local ranchers, homesteaders and townspeople who surrounded them built their own breastworks around the ranch. At least ten breastworks were built and three remain.

== History ==
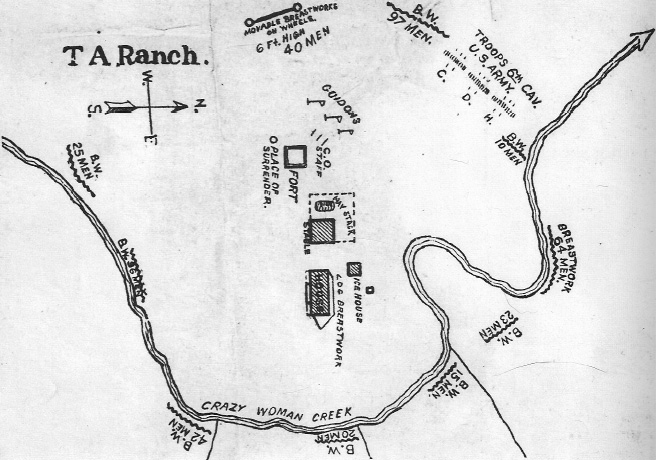
Drawing of the TA Ranch in 1892

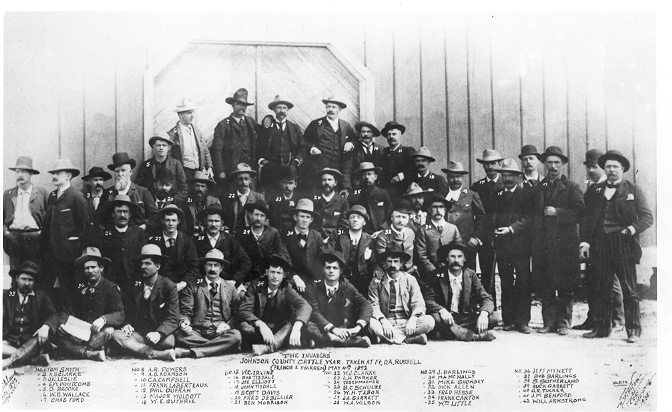
"The Invaders" of The Johnson County Cattle War. Photo taken at Fort D.A. Russell near Cheyenne, Wyoming, May 1892

The ranch was established in 1882 by Dr. William Harris of Laramie, who had purchased the brand and herd of Tom Alsop, also of Laramie. Harris moved the herd to Johnson County to set up the TA Ranch, remaining in Laramie to continue his medical practice, with Charles Ford as ranch manager. As such, Harris was an absentee landowner and was politically aligned with the larger cattle barons. In 1892 a party of hired guns paid by the Wyoming Stockmen's Association embarked on a raid to hunt down "rustlers" who were supposedly stealing cattle from the stockmen. However, the mercenary company was resented by the smaller landowners prevalent in northern Wyoming and were confronted by a large group of local settlers and cowboys. The gunmen (frequently referred to as "invaders") retreated to the TA Ranch, which they proceeded to fortify. Soon, about fifty invaders were surrounded by almost four hundred locals. The invaders were rescued by U.S. Cavalry from Fort McKinney on the third day of the siege.

Harris traded the ranch to J.P. Gammon for another property in 1904, and Gammon used the TA to raise Percheron draft horses. In the 1920s Gammon started to raise Hereford cattle and expanded the ranch to raise hogs. The ranch changed hands to the Long Brothers in 1979, followed by several other changes of ownership.

The ranch was purchased and restored privately in 1991. Today the TA Ranch is a working cattle ranch, guest ranch and restaurant but visitors are always welcome to view the barn and property free of charge.

== Gallery ==
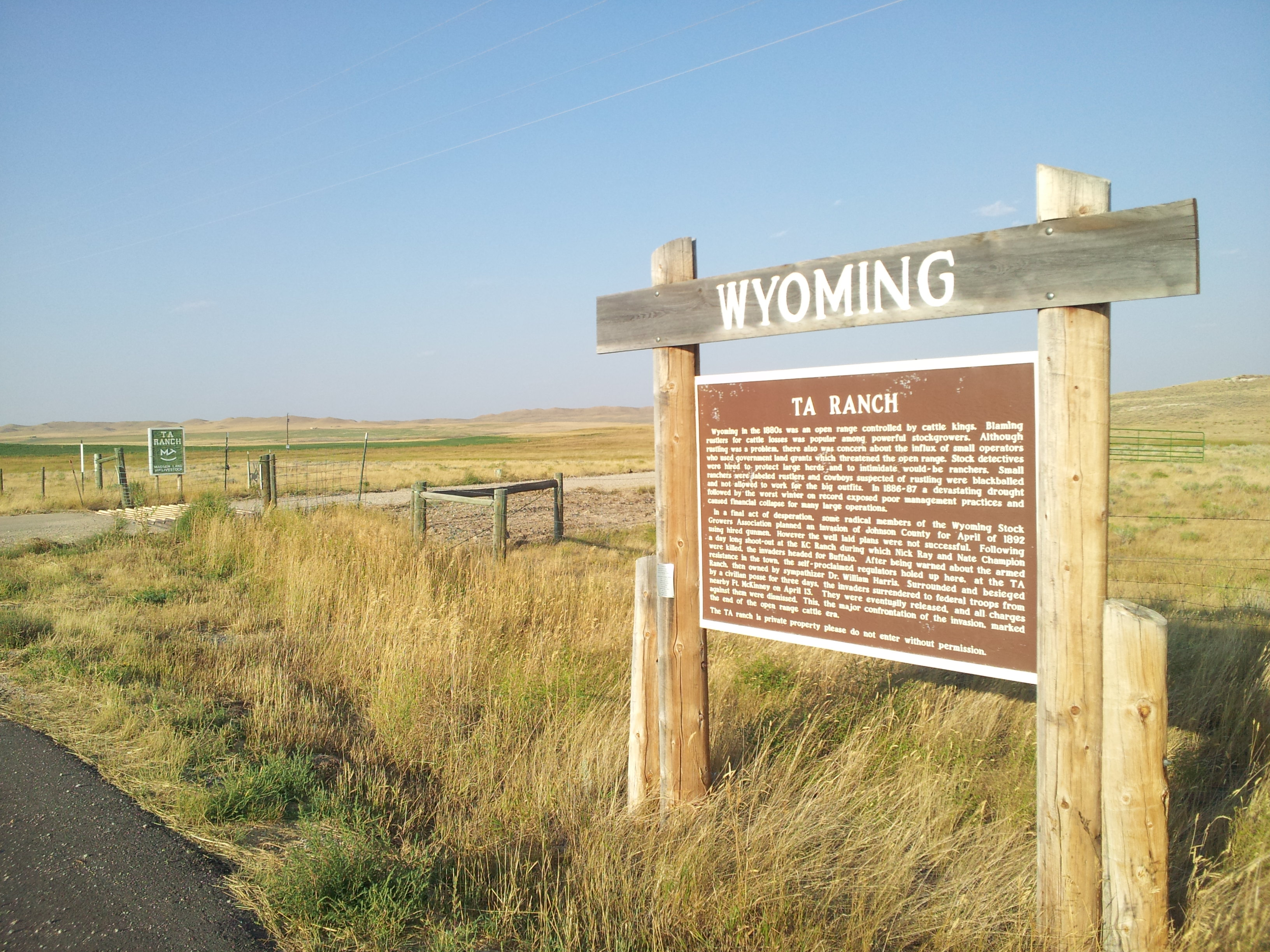
Entrance to TA Ranch on Wyoming Highway 196
