= Banditti of the Plains =

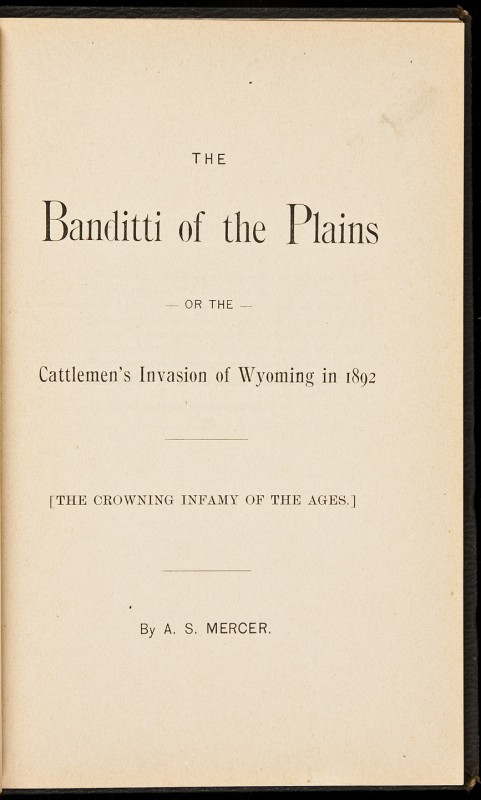
- Author: Asa Mercer
- Subject: Johnson County War
- Publication date: 1894

Banditti of the Plains is a book written by Asa Mercer about the 1889 to 1893 Johnson County War in Wyoming, United States, where wealthy cattle ranchers intent on controlling limited resources enlisted hired guns to fight smaller settlers and homesteaders.

== Publication history ==
The title of the book was taken from a now-forgotten Western titled The Banditti of the Range.

It is written from the perspective of Mercer, who had come to Wyoming to edit the North West Live Stock Journal, the official publication of the Wyoming Stock Growers Association (WSGA), which represented the monied interests intent on controlling the cattle industry. As the events of the range wars unfolded, Mercer came to sympathize with the homesteaders and turned against the WSGA. The book reflects his pro-settler view and is an important document of the events.

The first edition of the book is one of the rarities of western Americana. Immediately after it was printed, the Wyoming cattlemen objected and sued. The court ordered it destroyed. While the books were in the court's custody, a number were stolen and smuggled to Denver and later bound. For many years, the Wyoming Stockgrowers' Association, their sympathizers, and their descendants destroyed every copy they came across. Surviving copies are rare, and in 2016 copies were listed for prices between $1,250 and $6000. The second edition simply disappeared somewhere between Denver, Colorado, and Cheyenne, Wyoming, and the Wyoming Stock Growers Association was rumored to have hijacked and destroyed the second printing as it was being shipped.

Mercer saw his printing press in Cheyenne burned down; he was harassed, arrested, jailed and had the plates of his book destroyed. His writings were seized in the mails as obscenity; his business was ruined.

Mercer's main views of the Johnson County War were ultimately proved true, and never again did the cattle barons attempt to invade Wyoming.

Thanks to republication in 1954 by the University of Oklahoma Press, with a foreword by William H. Kittrell, the first edition text is now readily available, having appeared in paperback in 1976.

== Pawn Stars appearance ==
In "Stick to Your Guns", a November 12, 2012, episode of the reality television series Pawn Stars, a visitor to the Gold & Silver Pawn Shop in Las Vegas brought in an 1884 .45 Colt revolver that belonged to Sheriff Fred Coats, which was accompanied by a copy of Banditti of the Plains. The seller pointed out that Page 140 of the book mentions that Coats was one of three men involved in an assault during the Wyoming Range Wars.
