= Nate Champion =

American cattleman (1857–1892)

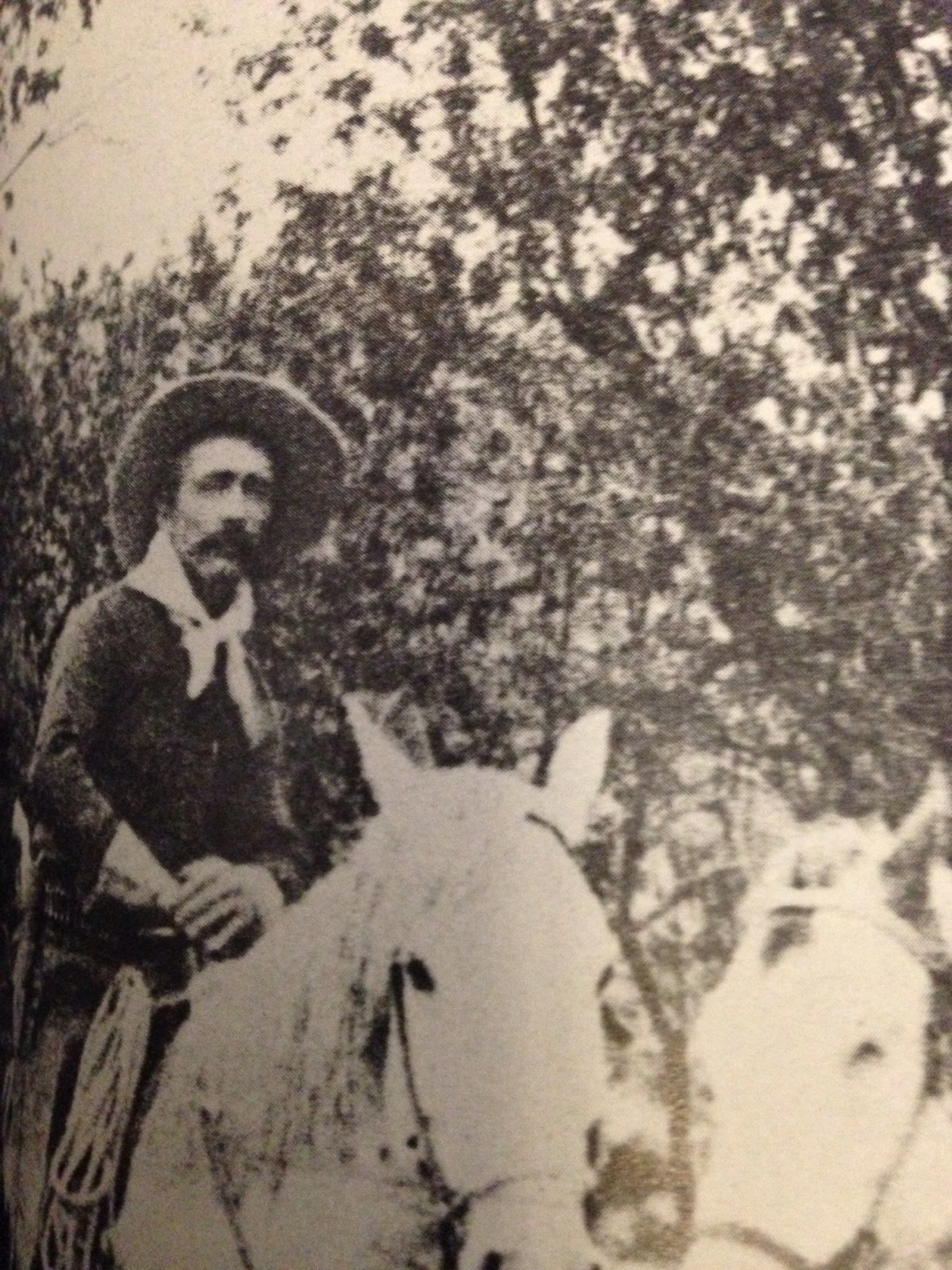
Nate Champion in the 1880s

Nathan D. Champion (September 29, 1857 – April 9, 1892) — known as Nate Champion — was a key figure in the Johnson County War. Falsely accused by a wealthy Wyoming cattlemen's association of being a rustler, Champion was the first person targeted by a band of hit men hired by the wealthy cattle barons. In reality, Champion was simply a small rancher who stood up against the big cattlemen's practice of claiming all unbranded young cattle on the range. He is celebrated for his heroic stand in his besieged cabin and for a heartfelt letter written at the time describing the events.

== Early life ==
Nate Champion was born 29 September 1857 near Round Rock, Texas. His parents were John and Naomi Champion, and he had seventeen brothers and sisters. His father served as sheriff of Williamson County while his Aunt Hattie Cluck drove her own cattle to market in Abilene, Kansas in 1871. With the money she and her husband George earned, they purchased the land that would become Cedar Park.

Like most footloose cowboys of that area, Nate Champion worked his way north to Wyoming where he worked for several ranches before building his own spread. He built and cultivated his homestead to the point that he owned 8 pack horses and over 200 head of cattle by the time of his death. During that time, Champion would also be associated with a loose-nit group of cowboys and drifters in what was known as the Hole-in-the-Wall area; this group would soon gain infamy for allegedly conducting various criminal activities.

== Johnson County War ==
In the early days in Wyoming, most of the land was in the public domain, open both to stockraising as open range and to homesteading. As the state was ravaged by powerful blizzards between 1886-1887, affecting most of the territory, a rivalry between the wealthier cattle ranchers and smaller and more independent homesteaders brewed. The Wyoming Stock Growers Association began to aggressively appropriate land, control the flow and supply of water, and take ownership of every unbranded cattle on the range. They justified these excesses on what was public land by using the catch-all allegation of rustling, and vigorously sought to exclude the smaller ranchers from participation in the annual roundup. This culminated in several murders beginning in 1889, starting a range war that what would become the Johnson County War.

=== First assassination attempt ===
Being one of the most outspoken of the homesteaders, Nate Champion became a prominent opponent of the cattle barons. He was associated with a rival association known as the Northern Wyoming Farmers and Stock Growers Association, who aimed to challenge the economic grip of the WSGA by organizing their own cattle round-ups. Champion also became the president of the NWFSGA in absentia, even after declining his nomination. Soon, the WSGA marked him for death.

On November 1, 1891, Nate Champion and Ross Gilbertson were sleeping in a cabin near the Middle Fork of the Powder River, when a group of armed men entered the building in an apparent attempt to ambush them. Due to the cabin's limited size, only two men were able to enter while several others remained outside. Champion awoke when the intruders entered and, after noticing that they were armed, retrieved a pistol concealed beneath his pillow. An exchange of gunfire followed, during which Champion wounded two of the attackers, including Billy Lykins, who later died from his injuries. The remaining members of the group then withdrew from the area. An investigation was conducted to capture the men responsible, but this only led to the further murders of two other small ranchers.

=== Gunfight at the KC Ranch ===
On April 1892, the WSGA hired killers from Texas; an expedition of 50 men was organized, which proceeded by train from Cheyenne to Casper, Wyoming, then toward Johnson County, intending to eliminate alleged rustlers and also, apparently, to replace the government in Johnson County. Major Frank Wolcott led the Regulators into Johnson County. To prevent an alarm, the telegraph lines out of Buffalo were cut. The expedition was accompanied by two newspaper reporters whose lurid accounts later appeared in the eastern newspapers. Their first target was Nate Champion. The cowboy and three others were at the KC Ranch when the cattle barons surrounded the area. They captured two of the occupants while they went out to gather water. They then shot Nick Ray as he exited the cabin and stood at the entrance, mortally wounding him. Champion was left besieged.

Champion held out for several hours, killing at least four of the vigilantes, and wounding several others. During the siege, Champion kept a poignant journal which contained a number of notes he wrote to friends while taking cover inside the cabin. "Boys, I feel pretty lonesome just now. I wish there was someone here with me so we could watch all sides at once." he wrote. The last journal entry read: "Well, they have just got through shelling the house like hail. I heard them splitting wood. I guess they are going to fire the house tonight. I think I will make a break when night comes, if alive. Shooting again. It's not night yet. The house is all fired. Goodbye, boys, if I never see you again." Two passers-by noticed the ruckus and rode to Buffalo, where Johnson County Sheriff William "Red" Angus raised a posse of 200 men and set out for the KC Ranch.

With the house on fire, Nate Champion signed his journal entry and put the journal in his pocket before he emerged, running from the back door with a Colt revolver in the left hand and a Winchester rifle in the right. He was gunned down by four men firing simultaneously, hit by 28 bullets. The invaders later pinned a note on Champion's bullet-riddled chest that read "Cattle Thieves Beware". They also carefully removed entries from the diary which named some of the attackers.

== Aftermath of death ==
The following day the posse led by the sheriff besieged the invading force at the "TA Ranch" on Crazy Woman Creek. After two days, one of the invaders escaped and was able to contact the acting Governor of Wyoming, Amos W. Barber. Frantic efforts to save the besieged invaders ensued, and telegraphs to Washington resulted in intervention by the President of the United States, Benjamin Harrison. The Sixth Cavalry from Fort McKinney was ordered to proceed to the "TA Ranch" and take custody of the invaders and save them from the posse. As part of the surrender, the invaders turned in all their arms and equipment to the Army. Major Wolcott, as unofficial leader of the group made a list of these arms and provided it to the government.

In the end the invaders went free due to cunning legal maneuvers by the defense attorneys. Many of the leaders of the invaders, such as W. C. Irvine, were themselves Republicans, and their opponents were mostly Democrats. A scandal was caused by the rescue of the Invaders at the order of President Harrison, and the failure of the courts to prosecute them. As a result of the scandal, Wyoming voted Democratic in the elections of 1894. The Johnson County War ended in 1893 with the shooting and killing of Nate Champion's brother, Dudley Champion, considered to be the last casualty of the range war. However, the homesteaders became the victors of the conflict as the WSGA finally ended their violence, and allowed the former to apply for membership and participate in the round-ups.

== Dramatic representations ==
- Henry Brandon (1912–1990) played Champion in a 1955 episode of Jim Davis's syndicated western television series, Stories of the Century.
- Christopher Walken played a highly fictionalized Champion in Michael Cimino's 1980 film Heaven's Gate.
- Tom Berenger is Cain Hammett in Johnson County War. Cain is completely based on the life, actions and looks of Nate Champion.
