= William C. Irvine (politician) =

American politician (1852–1924)

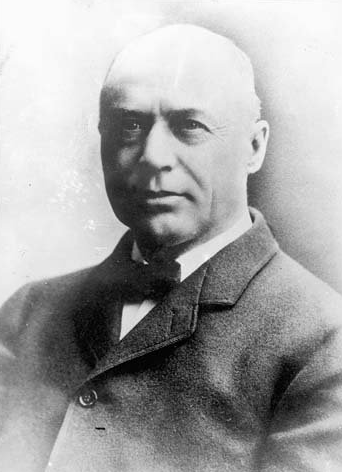

Member of the Wyoming Senate
- In office 1913–1917

5th Treasurer of Wyoming
- In office September 19, 1903 – January 7, 1907
- Preceded by: Henry G. Hay
- Succeeded by: Edward Gillette

Personal details
- Born: March 3, 1852 Carlisle, Pennsylvania, U.S.
- Died: July 27, 1924 (aged 72) Santa Monica, California, U.S.
- Resting place: Lakeview Cemetery, Cheyenne, Wyoming, U.S.
- Party: Republican
- Other political affiliations: Democratic
- Spouse: Carolyne W. Sparhawk
- Children: 3
- Parents: James Ross Irvine (father); Jane M. Irvine (mother)

William C. Irvine (March 3, 1852 – July 27, 1924) was an American politician who served as the Treasurer of Wyoming as a Republican.

== Life ==
William C. Irvine was born in Carlisle, Pennsylvania on March 3, 1852 to James Ross and Jane M. Irvine. In 1872 he moved to the Wyoming Territory and became active in the cattle industry with him becoming the manager of the Ogalalla Cattle Company, the largest cattle company in Wyoming.

In 1889 he was selected as one of the Democratic delegates to the Wyoming constitutional convention to draft its constitution to be submitted for statehood. During the Johnson County War he joined 23 gunmen and 4 cattle detectives from the Wyoming Stock Growers Association with Bob Tisdale, W. J. Clarke, and Hubert Teshemacher and later became involved in a shootout where he was wounded. In April 1892 he was arrested for shooting O. H. Flagg, a cattle rustler, but was found not guilty. In 1903 he was appointed as treasurer of Wyoming and won a term in his own right in 1904. During the 1910 gubernatorial election he managed Joseph M. Carey's campaign. In 1912 he was elected to the state senate by one vote and served from 1913 to 1917 in the Wyoming Senate. During World War I he served as state director of war finance for Wyoming.

On July 27, 1924 he died in Santa Monica, California. His funeral was conducted by Freemasons with Senator John B. Kendrick, whom Irvine had supported for governor in 1914 and later for senator, in attendance to praise him.
