= Ellen Watson =

American rancher (1860–1889)

Cattle Kate
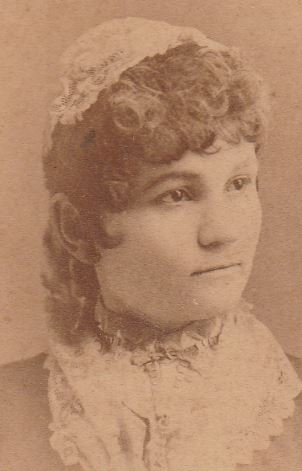
- Ella Watson "Cattle Kate"
- Born: July 2, 1860; Arran Lake, Bruce County, Canada West
- Died: July 20, 1889 (aged 29); Natrona County, Wyoming, US
- Other names: Ella Watson, Cattle Kate, Mrs. James Averell
- Occupation: Rancher
- Known for: lynched for political reasons

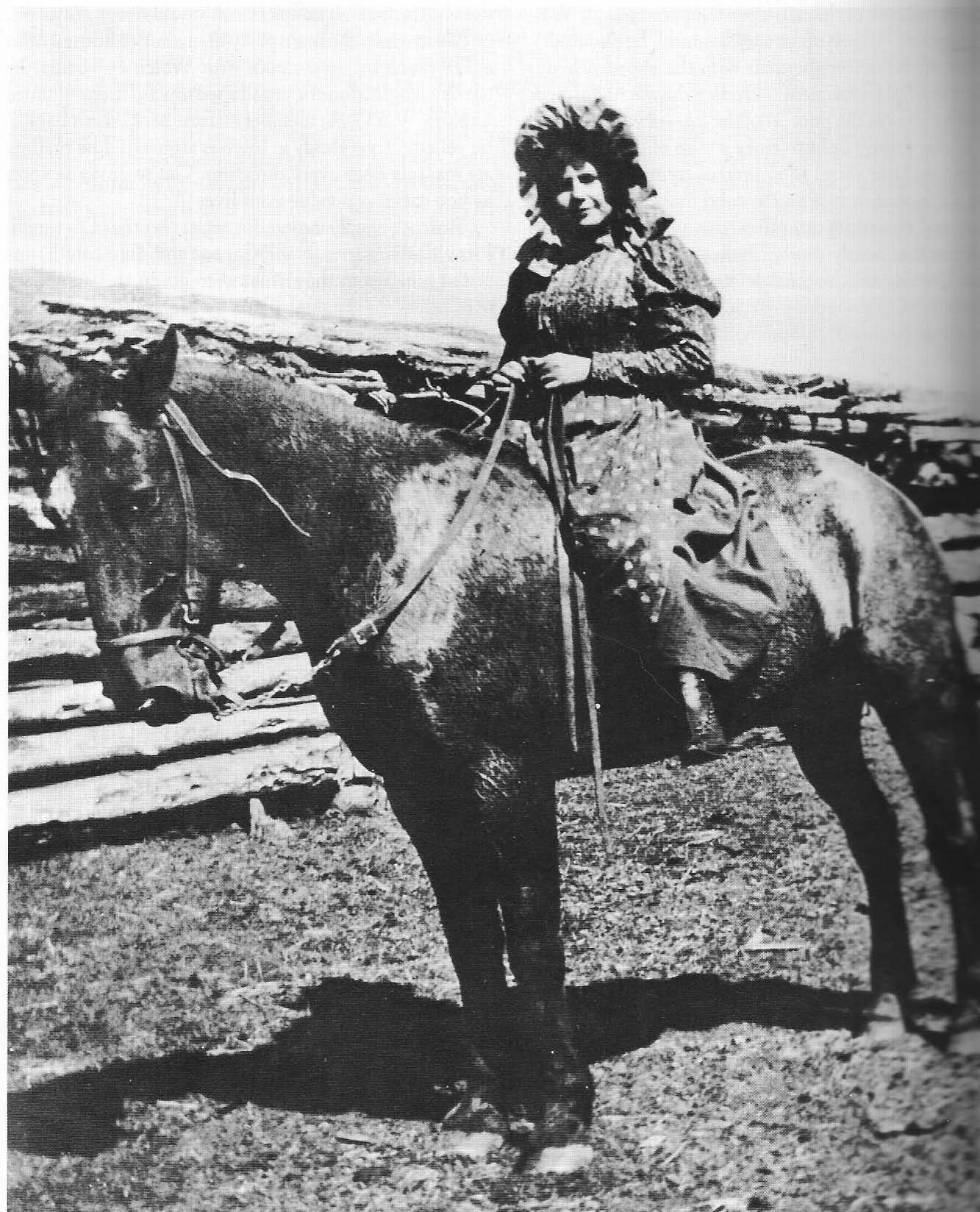
"Cattle Kate"

Ellen Liddy "Ella" Watson (July 2, 1860 – July 20, 1889) was a pioneer of Wyoming who became known as Cattle Kate, an outlaw of the Old West, although the characterization is a dubious one, as subsequent research has tended to see her as a much maligned victim of a self-styled land baron. Watson had acquired homestead rights on land with water resources vital to the wealthiest rancher in the county, Albert Bothwell, when she was accused by him of cattle rustling.

She was abducted from her home and lynched along with her husband by Bothwell and some other ranchers he had incited against her. The bodies were left hanging for two days, and the reputation that attached to her until recently was quickly established by newspaper publicity. Their deaths were the beginning of the Johnson County War. Accounts of Watson as a rustler are now regarded as highly biased. Her life has become an Old West legend and inspired a number of television and film accounts.

== Early life ==
Ellen Liddy Watson was born about July 1860. It is likely that she was the daughter of Thomas Lewis Watson and Francis Close, who married the next year on May 15, 1861, in Grey County, Ontario. The eldest of ten surviving children, Watson helped at home and attended school, learning to read and write in a small one-room building. In 1877, the family moved to Lebanon, Kansas.

Soon after the move, Watson went to Smith Center, Kansas, to work as a cook and housekeeper for H.R. Stone. While there, she met farm laborer William A. Pickell. They married on November 24, 1879. Their wedding portrait survives, depicting a "tall, square-faced woman", Watson was probably 5 foot 8 inches tall, and weighed about 165 pounds (75 kg). She had brown hair, blue eyes and a Scottish accent, inherited from her parents.

Pickell was verbally and physically abusive and drank heavily. He would often beat Ella with a horsewhip. In January 1883, Watson fled back to her parents' home. Pickell came after her, but was intimidated by her father and fled, and had no contact with her afterwards. Watson moved to Red Cloud, Nebraska, 12 miles (19 km) north of her family's homestead. She worked at the Royal Hotel for a year while establishing residency and then filed for divorce.

That same year she moved, against her family's wishes, to Denver, Colorado, to join one of her brothers who lived there. She then moved on to Cheyenne, Wyoming. It was unusual during that period in American history for a woman to move independently and alone, but she found work as a seamstress and a cook.

Watson disliked Cheyenne and in late 1885 or early 1886 followed the railroad to Rawlins, Wyoming, where she began working as cook and waitress in the premier boarding-house in town, the Rawlins House.

== Life with Averell ==
On February 24, 1886, Watson met James "Jim" Averell, who was in Rawlins to file a homestead claim for land along the Sweetwater River, about 1 mile (1.6 km) from the Oregon, Mormon, and California Trails. There he opened a restaurant and general store catering to cowboys and to people traveling west. He quickly hired Watson to cook at his restaurant; customers paid 50 cents each for a meal.

In May, she and Averell applied for a marriage license 100 miles (160 km) away, in Lander, Wyoming. The license listed her as "Ellen Liddy Andrews". It is unclear whether the two were legally married, although historians think it likely that the marriage did take place, but was kept a secret. This allowed Watson to apply for land through the Homestead Act of 1862, which permitted single women, but not married women, to buy 160 acres of land, provided they improved it within five years. In August 1886 Watson filed squatter's rights to the land adjacent to Averell's. In May 1888, she filed her homestead claim to the same piece of land. To meet the requirements of the Homestead Act, Watson had a small cabin and corral constructed on her property.

To earn extra money, Watson mended clothing for cowboys. The fact that men frequently visited her cabin may have led to rumors that she was a prostitute.

== Watson and the WSGA ==
With her savings, Watson bought cattle from emigrants on the trails. She fenced about 60 acres (24 ha) of her land with barbed wire, but this would not have been enough grazing area for her small herd. In this era, many ranchers grazed their cattle on public land. In 1872, about two dozen of the cattlemen with the largest ranches banded together to create the Wyoming Stock Growers Association (WSGA) to protect their rights to the open range. After suffering massive losses in the Snow Winter of 1880–1881, when cattle were unable to get to the grass under the snowdrifts, ranchers began growing hay as an alternative way of feeding the animals during the winter. For an area with little rainfall, this meant that access to water for irrigation was now crucial to the survival of the ranches. The land claimed by Watson and Averell controlled 1 mile (1.6 km) of water along Horse Creek.

A law at the time stated that unbranded calves became the property of the WSGA. The cattlemen's associations limited small ranchers from bidding at auctions, and insisted that all ranchers, small and large, have a registered brand. The cost for registering a brand was exorbitant, ensuring that few small ranchers could afford it. Also, a brand had to be "accepted", and the cattlemen's associations had substantial power inside the committee that either rejected or accepted brands, thus locking out smaller ranchers. Over a three-year period, Watson and Averell filed applications for five different brands and were denied each time. In 1889, she bought a previously registered brand, "L-U", (an altered pronunciation of 'Ella') from John Crowder.

=== Bothwell ===
A neighbor, the wealthy cattleman Albert John Bothwell, who actually did not have legal title to much land apart from what his house stood on, made several offers to buy Watson and Averell's land from them. They repeatedly declined.

With a brand of her own, Watson was now able to mark her own cattle. In July 1889, just as the spring roundup was ending, Watson branded her cattle. Forty-one cattle were branded, a relatively high number considering the year before she had purchased only 28, all specifically described as being in poor health. Although it is possible that some cattle had broken through her fence and were accidentally mixed in with her own, it is also likely that many of the calves were mavericks, which the WSGA considered their property.

In a move that may have been retaliation for the repeated denial of her brand applications, Watson filed for approval to construct a water ditch to irrigate more of her land. This ditch, if built, would reduce the amount of water available to neighboring ranchers, including Bothwell. Bothwell, who had fenced the public land he used, though this was not in accordance with the law, began to fence in parts of Ella's ranch and sent his cowboys to harass the couple. The couple apparently did not realize the danger they were in. On July 20, 1889, a range detective, George Henderson, was cited by Bothwell in a meeting with other ranchers as having seen that Watson had rustled cattle. Some wanted nothing to do with Bothwell's plan to lynch the couple, but five agreed.

Watched by Gene Crowder, Bothwell and those ranchers he had convinced to go along with him arrived on the ranch with a buckboard and told Ella at gunpoint to get on it or be shot as they were arresting her for rustling and taking her to Rawlins. Crowder rode for help, reporting the news to the couple's friend Frank Buchanan. By the time Buchanan reached where they had stopped, Bothwell was stringing up a rope, and one of his men putting a noose around her neck. Buchanan started shooting but was forced back and both Jim and Ella were hanged.

== Aftermath of killings ==
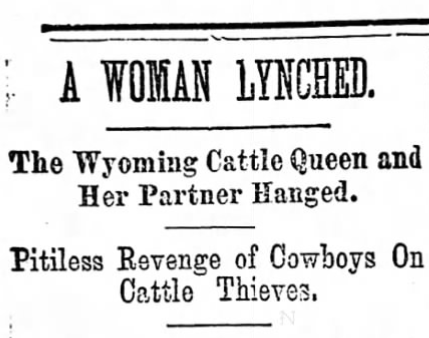
News article about the lynching of Watson, August 1889

County Sheriff Frank Hadsell and Deputy Sheriff Phil Watson (no relation to Ella) arrested Albert Bothwell and five other men for the two murders. A trial date was set, but Gene Crowder and John DeCorey both left the area before the trial, while Buchanan was initially taken into protective custody, but later disappeared and was widely thought to have been murdered, despite claims to the contrary by a newspaper.

The day that Watson and Averell were lynched, George Henderson received a telegram. He immediately went to the Cheyenne Daily Sun and then other papers controlled by the WSGA. The next day, those papers published lurid accounts of the crimes of prostitute and cattle rustler "Cattle Kate" Maxwell and her partner-in-crime, James Averell. Daily Sun editor Ed Towse's 1,300-word article justified the "lawless but justifiable deed" of lynching Averell and "Maxwell". He stated that "the cattlemen have been forced to this and more hangings will follow unless there is less thieving." The articles and those that followed marked the first time that the cattlemen had used the press as a tool to justify and glorify their violence. The tactic was so successful that it was resurrected during the violence of 1891 and 1892.

Although the events caused a political controversy in the state, Bothwell acquired both homesteads of the murdered victims and ran his ranch without any legal repercussion or other retribution until he retired to Los Angeles, where he died in the 1920s. The Watson-Averell hangings finally prompted other small independent settlers in Northern Wyoming to begin arming themselves against further violence from the cattle barons. Historian Dorothy Gray considers the double lynchings as the "opening skirmish" of the Johnson County War.

== Legacy ==
Those who knew her spoke highly of Watson. A stage station operator, Harry Ward, described Watson as "a fine looking woman", saying: "Other women looked down on her in those days, but no matter what she was or did she had a big heart. Nobody went hungry around her."

Watson's death, and that of Averell, "became symbols of the societal contempt raging against rustlers during the latter part of the nineteenth century". The Cattle Kate myth was largely accepted until the late 20th century, when composer George Hufsmith began researching Watson's life for an opera, The Sweetwater Lynching. He received a lot of information from her family and eventually used his research in writing a biography of Watson.

The 1953 movie The Redhead from Wyoming was loosely based on the myth of Watson as Kate Maxwell. Maureen O'Hara played a madam who inadvertently helped Averell (William Bishop) run a cattle rustling empire. Another highly fictionalized version of the lives of Ella Watson and James Averell was produced in 1980. Heaven's Gate, directed by Michael Cimino and starring Kris Kristofferson and Isabelle Huppert, was "one of the most costly films ever made - and one of Hollywood's biggest box office failures".

"Witness to a Lynching", a 1972 episode of Alias Smith and Jones, was based on the Averell-Watson hanging, as was one part of the 2002 TV movie The Johnson County War, with Rachel Ward playing Queenie, a character based loosely on Watson.

Watson's story appears in Red Light Women of the Rocky Mountain by Jan MacKell and includes an illustration of her made by Herndon Davis.

== See also ==
- Cattle Annie – American outlaw (1882–1978)
- Frontier justice – Extrajudicial punishment
- Lynching of women in the United States

== Sources ==
- Davis, John W. (2012), Wyoming Range War: The Infamous Invasion of Johnson County, University of Oklahoma Press, ISBN 9780806183800
- Franscell, Ron (2008), The Darkest Night: Two Sisters, a Brutal Murder, and the Loss of Innocence, Macmillan, ISBN 9780312948467
- Lackmann, Ronald W. (1997), Women of the Western Frontier in Fact, Fiction, and Film, McFarland, ISBN 9780786404001
- McLure, Helen (2007), "Bad Men, Unsexed Women, and Good Citizens: Outlaws and Vigilantes in the American West", in Peter Mancall; Benjamin Heber Johnson (eds.), Making of the American West: People and Perspective, Perspectives in American Social History, ABC-CLIO, ISBN 9781851097630
- Van Pelt, Lori (2003), "Cattle Kate: Homesteader or Cattle Thief?", in Riley, Glenda; Richard W. Etulain (eds.), Wild Women of the Old West, Notable Westerners, vol. 4, Fulcrum Publishing, ISBN 9781555912956
- Wilson, R. Michael (2013), Outlaw Tales of Wyoming, 2nd: True Stories of the Cowboy State's Most Infamous Crooks, Culprits, and Cutthroats, Globe Pequot, ISBN 9781493004355
