= Johnson County War =

1889–1893 range conflict in Johnson County, Wyoming

- Part of the Range Wars
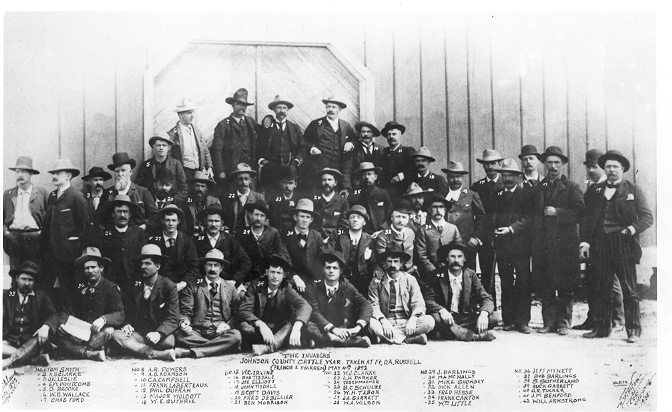
- "The Invaders" of The Johnson County Cattle War. Photo taken at Fort D.A. Russell near Cheyenne, Wyoming, May 1892
Date	July 20, 1889 – May 24, 1893 (3 years, 10 months and 4 days)
Location	Northern Wyoming, United States
Result	Homesteader victory

Belligerents
Wyoming Stock Growers Association	Homesteaders: Northern Wyoming Farmers and Stock Growers' Association	United States Military: (United States) 6th Cavalry Regiment; (United States) 9th Cavalry Regiment

Commanders and leaders
Frank Wolcott; Frank M. Canton (Wyoming) Amos W. Barber	Nate Champion †; William "Red" Angus	(United States) J.J. Van Horn (United States) Charles B. Gatewood (WIA) (United States) Charles S. Isley

Strength
50 total: 23 Texas gunmen	Approx. 200–300	3 cavalry troops 310 Buffalo Soldiers

Casualties and losses
2 WSGA employees killed 2 Texas gunmen killed 1 US Marshall killed	10 homesteaders killed	2-3 Buffalo Soldiers killed
- 20–40 total killed

The Johnson County War, also known as the War on Powder River and the Wyoming Range War, was a range war in Northern Wyoming from 1889 to 1893. The conflict began when cattle companies started ruthlessly persecuting alleged rustlers, many of whom were settlers who competed with them for livestock, land and water rights. As violence swelled between the large established ranchers and the smaller settlers in the state, it culminated in the Powder River Country, when the ranchers hired gunmen to invade the county. The gunmen's initial incursion in the territory alerted the small farmers and ranchers, as well as the state lawmen, and they formed a posse of 200 men that led to a grueling standoff, ending when the United States Cavalry on the orders of President Benjamin Harrison relieved the two forces, although further fighting persisted.

The events have since become a highly mythologized and symbolic story of the Wild West and over the years variations of the story have come to include some of its most famous historical figures. In addition to being one of the best-known range wars of the American frontier, its themes, especially class warfare, served as a basis for numerous popular novels, films and television shows in the Western genre.

== Background ==
Conflict over land was a common occurrence in the development of the American West, but became particularly prevalent when large portions of it were settled by new immigrants for the first time through the Homestead Acts. It is a period that one historian, Richard Maxwell Brown, has called the "Western Civil War of Incorporation", which the Johnson County War was a part of. According to him, this period lasted from the 1850s to the First World War, pitting powerful corporations and government-affiliated individuals who sought to incorporate the frontier into the market, against modest and independent groups such as Anglo-American homesteaders, Native Americans, and Hispanic settlers, resulting in violent conflicts such as the Indian wars and the range wars. This contributed to the West's reputation for violence.

In the early days of Wyoming, most of the land was in public domain, which was open to stock raising as an open range and farmlands for homesteading. Large numbers of cattle were turned loose on the open range by ranches. Each spring, round-ups were held to separate the cattle belonging to different ranchers. Before a round-up, an orphan or stray calf was sometimes surreptitiously branded, which was the common way to identify the cow's owners. However, as more and more homesteaders called "nesters" and "grangers" moved into Wyoming, competition for land and water soon enveloped the state, and the large cattle companies, also known as “cattle barons”, reacted by monopolizing large areas of the open range, preventing homesteaders from using it. The often uneasy relationship between the wealthier ranchers and smaller settlers became steadily aggravated when the Wyoming legislature submitted the Maverick Act in 1884, which stated that all unbranded cattle in the open range automatically belonged to the large ranchers.

Hostilities worsened after the harsh winter of 1886–1887, when a series of blizzards and temperatures of −40 to −50 °F (−40 to −46 °C), followed by an extremely hot and dry summer, ravaged the frontier. Thousands of cattle were lost in the calamity, forcing the surviving cattle barons to cut wages and lay-off many of their cowboys. In turn, these cowboys filed for homestead, further increasing competition. To protect whatever livestock remained, the cattle barons reacted with a catch-all allegation of rustling against their competition. The cattle barons also held a firm grip on Wyoming's stock interests by limiting the number of grangers who could participate, including in the annual round-ups. They also forbade their employees from owning cattle for fear of additional competition, and they threatened anyone they suspected to be rustlers. Although at a financial disadvantage, the homesteaders outnumbered the cattle barons significantly, and they tried to use this to win court cases by participating in the jury. However, records showed that they were still not successful.

=== Wyoming Stock Growers Association ===
Many of the large ranching outfits in Wyoming were organized as the Wyoming Stock Growers Association (the WSGA) and gathered socially at the Cheyenne Club in Cheyenne, Wyoming. Comprising some of the state's wealthiest and most influential residents, the organization held a great deal of political sway in the state and region. The WSGA organized the cattle industry by scheduling roundups and cattle shipments. The WSGA also employed an agency of detectives to investigate cases of cattle theft from its members' holdings. Grangers and rustlers often intermixed with one another in the community, making it more difficult for detectives to differentiate the criminals and the innocent homesteaders.

Rustling in the local area was likely increasing because of the harsh grazing conditions, and the illegal exploits of organized groups of rustlers were becoming well publicized in the late 1880s. Well-armed outfits of horse and cattle rustlers roamed across various portions of Wyoming and Montana, with Montana vigilantes such as the infamous Stuart's Stranglers declaring "War on the Rustlers" in 1884. Bandits taking refuge in the infamous hideout known as the Hole-in-the-Wall were also preying upon the herds. Frank M. Canton, Sheriff of Johnson County in the early 1880s and better known as a detective for the WSGA, was a prominent figure in supposedly eliminating these criminals from Wyoming. Before the events in Johnson County, Canton had already developed a reputation as a lethal gunman. At a young age he had worked as a cowboy in Texas, and in 1871 he started a career in robbery and cattle rustling, as well as killing a Buffalo Soldier on October 10, 1874. Historian Harry Sinclair Drago described Canton as a "merciless, congenital, emotionless killer. For pay, he murdered eight—very likely ten—men."

== Name and date ==
The term "Johnson County War" has been in use as early as April 23, 1892 during a report on the war by the Colorado newspaper Weekly Gazette. Author D.F. Baber used the term "Johnson County Cattle War" in his 1947 book about the conflict. Many writers of the time such as Asa Mercer and Owen Wister, dated it strictly to April 5–13, 1892, specifically during the invasion. Historian R. Michael Wilson agreed on this narrow definition, reasoning that only the deaths that happened in Johnson County, of which the conflict took its name, should be counted; barring the violence that happened in other Wyoming areas such as Natrona County and Weston County.

Modern historians propose a broader duration that includes all WSGA-related casualties throughout the state. John W. Davis offered an alternate date of 1891–1892, with "Wyoming Range War" as another name for the conflict. Jacob Rene Huntington suggested that it should be from July 20, 1889 to May 24, 1893, beginning with the double lynching of Ella Watson and Jim Averell and ending with the murder of Dudley Champion. Others such as R. W. Garvey, Andrew Rossi and Eugen Kotte, also listed the date of the war as from 1889 to 1893. During the 2022 congressional session that celebrated the 150th Anniversary of the Wyoming Stock Grower's Association, the same 1889–1893 date was used.

== War ==
=== Early killings ===
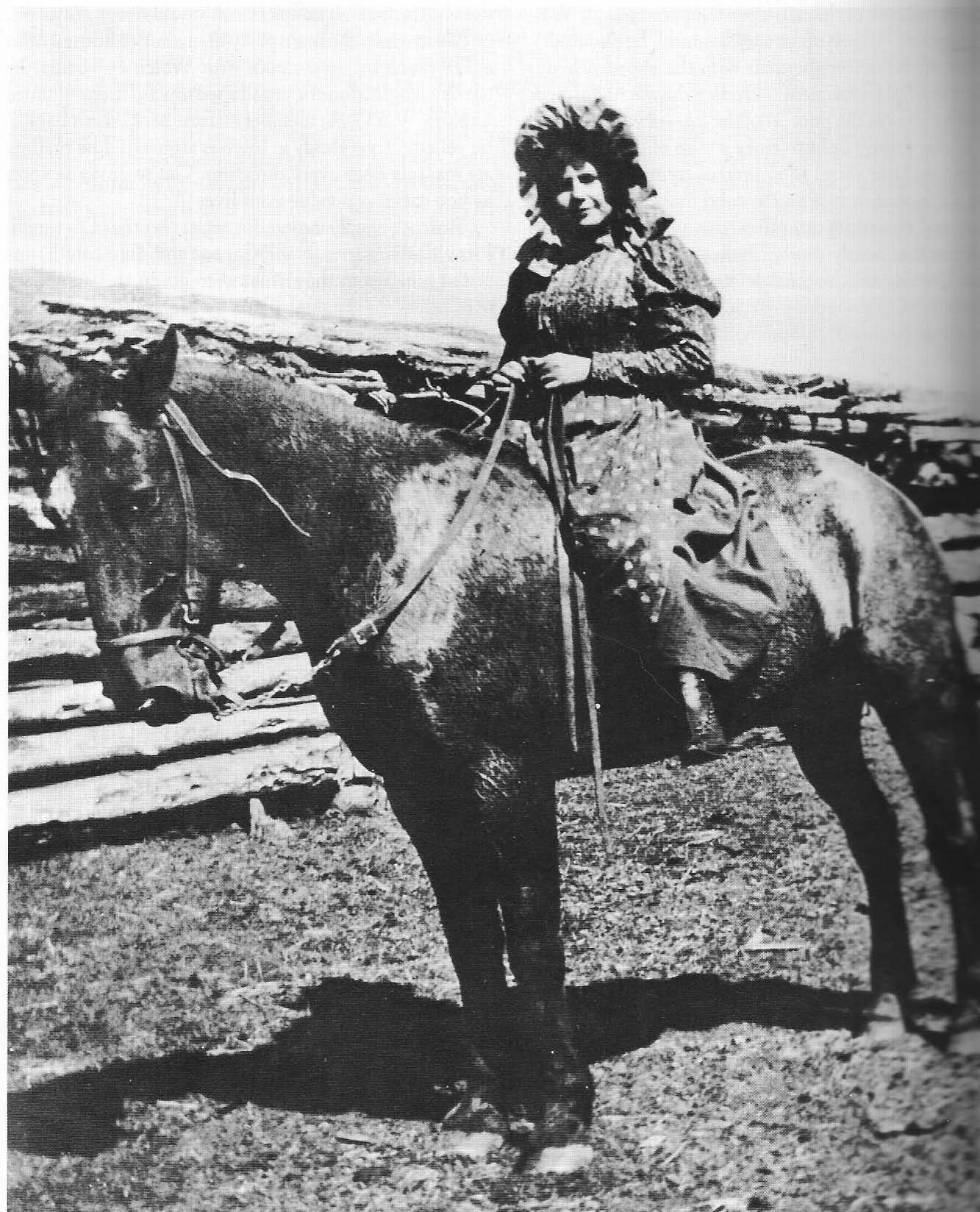
Ella Watson was lynched in 1889 by wealthy ranchers who accused her of cattle rustling, a charge that was later shown to be false.

On July 20, 1889, a range detective from the WSGA named George Henderson accused Ella Watson (better known as Cattle Kate), a local rancher, of stealing cattle from WSGA rancher Albert John Bothwell. The cattlemen sent riders to seize Watson before capturing her husband Jim Averell as well. Both of them were subsequently hanged near the Sweetwater River. This gruesome act was one of the rare cases in the Old West in which a woman was lynched, an event that appalled many Wyoming residents and paved the way for future events in the war. County Sheriff Frank Hadsell arrested six men for the lynching and a trial date was set. However, before the trial, threats were sent to the witnesses who were to testify against the aggressors. Watson's young workers who also served as key witnesses, Gene Crowder and John DeCorey, disappeared and were never seen again. Another, Averell's nephew and foreman Frank Buchanan, also disappeared from the county after a shootout with unknown suspects, and was presumed to be hiding or murdered. Ralph Cole, another nephew of Averell's, died on the day of the trial from poisoning.

George Henderson, one of the range detectives who had accused Watson, was murdered in Sweetwater River on October 8, 1890. Both Canton and rancher Cornelius P. Sheehan believed his killing was part of the ongoing conflict. The cattle barons soon tightened their control and hunted down those who tried to oppose them. The double lynching of the Averells was followed by the lynching of Tom Waggoner, a horse trader from Newcastle, on June 4, 1891. WSGA detective Joe Elliot and Deputy Sheriff Fred Coates were suspected of the crime; the latter was later appointed as administrator of Waggoner’s estate. A friend of Waggoner named Jimmy the Butcher, who was once arrested for rustling cattle belonging to the Standard Cattle Company, was also murdered. Range detective Tom Smith killed a suspected rustler, and when he was indicted for murder, political connections to the WSGA secured his release. These killings precipitated more hostilities and violence in the years to come.

The next individual to be targeted was a former cowboy named Nate Champion. On the morning of November 1, 1891, Champion and another man, named Ross Gilbertson, were sleeping in a cabin near the Middle Fork of the Powder River when a group of armed men went inside. Only two were able to fit into the small cabin while four others stood by outside. Champion was immediately awakened by the intrusion, and as the gunmen pointed their weapons at him, Champion reached for his own pistol hidden under a pillow and a shootout commenced. Champion successfully shot two of the gunmen, mortally wounding assassin Billy Lykins. The rest of the assassination squad subsequently fled. Champion was left uninjured except for some facial burns from gunpowder. In a subsequent investigation of the attack, the names of those involved were leaked to two ranchers: John A. Tisdale and Orley "Ranger" Jones. However, both men were ambushed and murdered while they were riding, which outraged many of the small ranchers and farmers in the state.

By spring of 1892, many small settlers from across Northern Wyoming travelled to Buffalo in Johnson County, and formed the Northern Wyoming Farmers and Stock Growers' Association (NWFSGA). Led by John R. Smith, Joe Debarthe, and Nate Champion, the group aimed to foster competition and challenge the grip of the WSGA on the Wyoming economy. Upon hearing this, members of the WSGA immediately viewed it as a threat to their hold on the stock interests. They then blacklisted members of the NWFSGA from the round-ups in order to stop their operations. However, the NWFSGA refused the orders to disband and instead publicly announced their plans to hold their own round-up on May 1, a month before the WSGA's. According to researcher Levette J. Davidson, this act became the "last straw" that inspired the WSGA to commit fully to armed violence.

=== Invasion ===
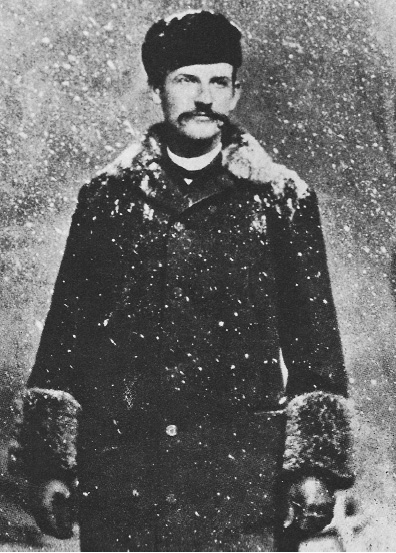
Frank M. Canton, former Sheriff of Johnson County, was hired to lead the band of Texas killers

The WSGA, led by Frank Wolcott (WSGA member and large North Platte rancher), hired gunmen with the intention of eliminating alleged rustlers in Johnson County and breaking up the NWFSGA. By that time, prominent names in Wyoming started taking sides. Acting governor Amos W. Barber supported the cattlemen, who blamed the small ranchers and homesteaders for the criminal activity in the state. Former cowboy, Indian War veteran, and Sheriff of Buffalo (the county seat of Johnson County), William "Red" Angus, supported the homesteaders, and believed that the cattle barons were abusing the homesteaders.

In March 1892, the cattlemen sent agents to Texas from Cheyenne and Idaho to recruit gunmen and finally carry out their plans for exterminating the homesteaders. This group became known as the "Invaders". The cattle barons had always used hired guns from Texas to take out suspected rustlers and scare away the nesters in Wyoming. One particular act of violence perpetrated by the Texans was recounted by cowboy John J. Baker, where the Texans ambushed and killed nine trappers whom they mistook for rustlers in Big Dry Creek, Wyoming. They received a $450 bonus for the slaughter.

Soon, 23 gunmen from Paris, Texas, and 4 cattle detectives from the WSGA were hired, as well as Wyoming dignitaries who also joined the expedition. State Senator Bob Tisdale, State Water Commissioner W. J. Clarke, as well as William C. Irvine and Hubert Teshemacher, who had both been instrumental in the organization of the State of Wyoming four years earlier, also joined the band. They were accompanied by surgeon Charles Bingham Penrose as well as Ed Towse, a reporter for the Cheyenne Sun, and a newspaper reporter for the Chicago Herald, Sam T. Clover, whose lurid first-hand accounts later appeared in eastern newspapers. A total expedition of 50 men was organized which consisted of cattlemen, range detectives, and the 23 hired guns from Texas. To lead the expedition, the WSGA hired Frank M. Canton. Canton's gripsack was later found to contain a list of 70 county residents to be either shot or hanged, and a contract to pay the Texans $5 a day plus a bonus of $50 for every rustler, real or alleged, they killed. The group became known as the "Invaders", or alternately, "Wolcott's Regulators".

John Clay, a prominent Wyoming businessman, was suspected of playing a major role in planning the Johnson County invasion. Clay denied this, saying that in 1891 he advised Wolcott against the scheme and was out of the country when it was undertaken. He later helped the Invaders avoid punishment after their surrender. The group organized in Cheyenne and proceeded by train to Casper, Wyoming, and then toward Johnson County on horseback, cutting the telegraph lines north of Douglas, Wyoming, in order to prevent an alarm. While on horseback, Canton and the gunmen traveled ahead while the party of WSGA officials led by Wolcott followed a safe distance behind.

=== Gunfight at the KC Ranch ===
The first target of the WSGA was Nate Champion, who was at the KC Ranch at that time. They were tasked to perform the assassination that others had failed to carry out five months before. The group traveled to the ranch late Friday, April 8, 1892, quietly surrounded the buildings, and waited for daybreak. Three men besides Champion were at the KC. Two men who were evidently going to spend the night on their way through were captured as they emerged from the cabin early that morning to collect water at the nearby Powder River, while the third, Nick Ray, was shot while standing inside the doorway of the cabin. As the gunmen opened fire on the cabin, Champion dragged the mortally wounded Ray back to the cabin. Ray died hours later, and Champion was left besieged inside the log cabin alone.

Champion held out for several hours, wounding three of the vigilantes, and was said to have killed four others. Another settler by the name of Jack Flagg passed by Champion's ranch on his wagon together with his stepson and witnessed the siege. The Invaders recognized Flagg as one of the men on the list and they started shooting at him. Flagg then rode away and, as the Invaders gave chase, he grabbed his rifle and drove them away. During the siege, Champion kept a poignant journal which contained a number of notes he wrote to friends while taking cover inside the cabin. "Boys, I feel pretty lonesome just now. I wish there was someone here with me so we could watch all sides at once," he wrote. The last journal entry read: "Well, they have just got through shelling the house like hail. I heard them splitting wood. I guess they are going to fire the house tonight. I think I will make a break when night comes, if alive. Shooting again. It's not night yet. The house is all fired. Goodbye, boys, if I never see you again."

The Invaders continued to shoot at the cabin while others set it on fire using a wagon they managed to steal from Flagg. Champion signed his journal entry and put it in his pocket before running from the back door with a six-shooter in one hand and either a knife or a rifle in the other. As he emerged, the Invaders shot him dead. The killers pinned a note on Champion's bullet-riddled chest that read, "Cattle thieves beware". Flagg, after escaping his pursuers, rode to Buffalo where he reported Champion's dilemma to the townsfolk. Sheriff Angus then raised a posse of 200 men, many of whom were Civil War veterans, over the next 24 hours and set out for the KC on Sunday night, April 10.

=== Siege of the TA Ranch ===
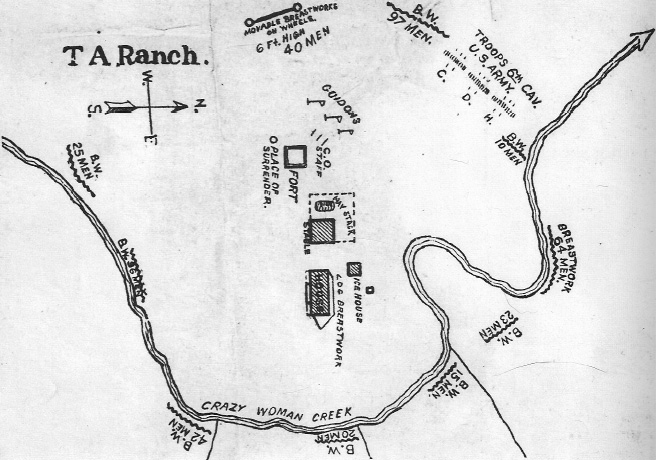
A map of the TA Ranch during the Johnson County War, depicting the positions of the Invaders, the posse, and the 6th Cavalry

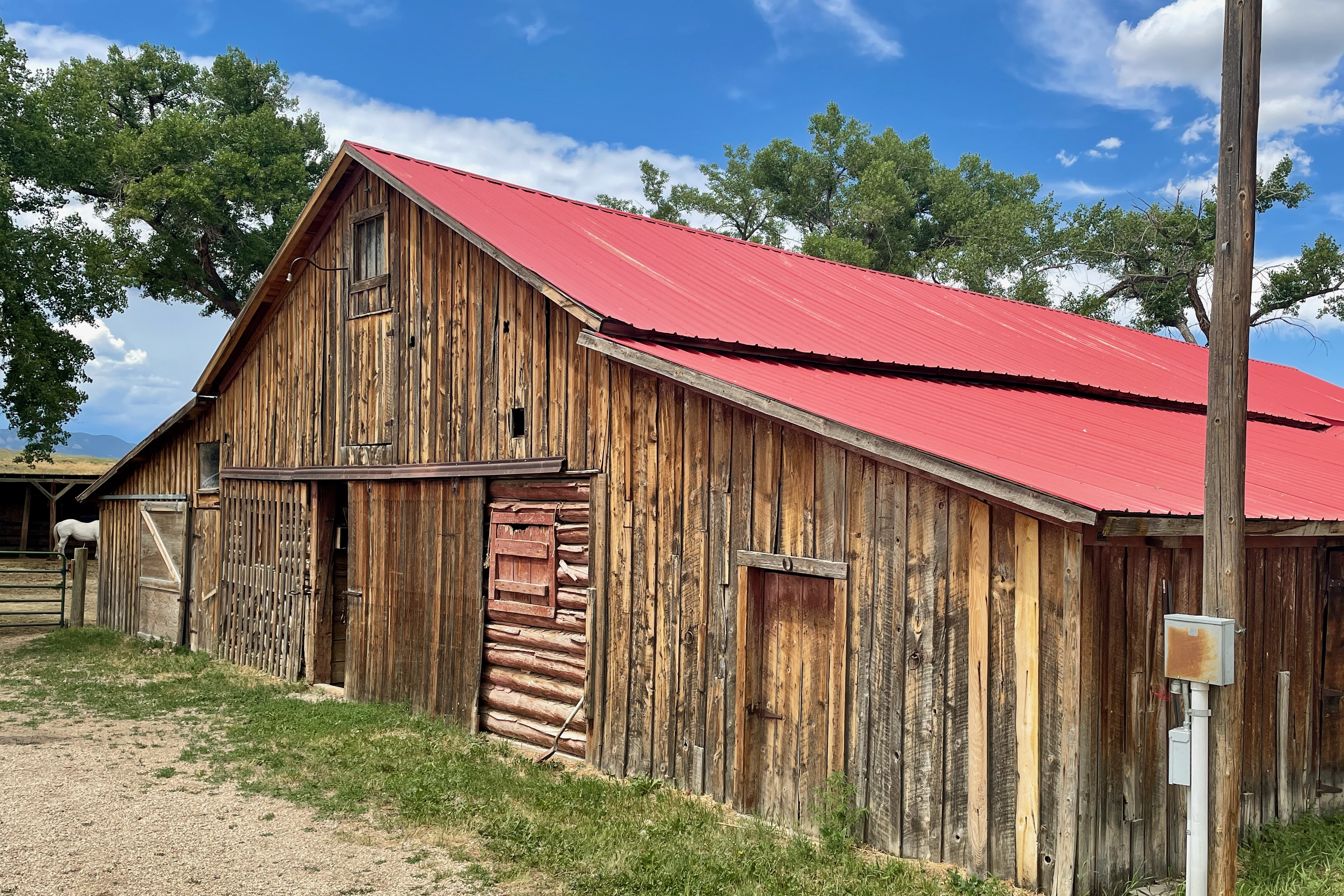
The barn at the TA Ranch, where the "regulators" were besieged by the sheriff's posse

The WSGA group then headed north on Sunday toward Buffalo to continue its show of force. By early morning of the 11th however, news quickly came of a large hostile force heading towards them. They quickly rode and took refuge in the TA Ranch in Crazy Woman Creek. The sheriff's posse finally reached the remaining Invaders holed up in a log barn at the TA Ranch, but the latter managed to hold them back, resulting in a siege that would last for three days. The posse surrounded the whole ranch, building pits on the ground for cover and killing the Invaders' horses to prevent them from escaping. Throughout the battle, the Invaders incurred a number of casualties, including two of the gunmen: Jim Dudley and Alex Lowther. As the siege dragged on, a settler rode off to Fort McKinney requesting to borrow a cannon but was turned down. A blacksmith named Rap Brown tried to build his own cannon, but it exploded upon first testing. He then built a siege engine that the posse referred to as a "go-devil' or "ark of safety" - a large, bullet-resistant wagon that would help the settlers get close to the ranch so they could throw dynamite at the Invaders.

Fortunately for the Invaders, one of their members, Mike Shonsey, managed to slip from the barn and was able to contact Governor Barber the next day. Frantic efforts to save the WSGA group ensued, and two days into the siege, late on the night of April 12, 1892, Governor Barber telegraphed President Benjamin Harrison a plea for help. For unknown reasons, the telegram failed to reach President Harrison, so Wyoming senators Joseph M. Carey and Francis E. Warren visited the White House in person and woke the President, informing him of the increasingly dangerous "insurrection" in Johnson County. Harrison immediately ordered the U.S. Secretary of War Stephen B. Elkins to address the situation under Article IV, Section 4, Clause 2 of the U.S. Constitution, which allows for the use of U.S. forces under the president's orders for "protection from invasion and domestic violence". The Sixth Cavalry from Fort McKinney near Buffalo, Wyoming, was ordered to proceed to the TA Ranch at once and take the WSGA expedition into custody. The Sixth Cavalry left Fort McKinney a few hours later at 2:00 on the morning of April 13 and reached the TA Ranch at 6:45 A.M. Colonel J.J. Van Horn, the officer in charge of the unit, negotiated with Sheriff Angus to lift the siege, and in return the Invaders were to be handed to civilian authorities. The Sixth Cavalry took possession of Wolcott and 45 other men with 45 rifles, 41 revolvers and some 5,000 rounds of ammunition, before escorting them first to Fort McKinney and then to Cheyenne.

The text of Barber's telegram to the President was printed on the front page of The New York Times on April 14, and a first-hand account of the siege at the T.A. appeared in The Times and the Chicago Herald and other papers.

== Arrest and legal action ==
The WSGA group was taken to Cheyenne to be held at the barracks of Fort D.A. Russell (currently Francis E. Warren Air Force Base) since the Laramie County Jail was unable to hold that many prisoners. They received preferential treatment and were allowed to roam the base by day as long as they agreed to return to the jail to sleep at night. Johnson County officials were upset that the group was not kept locally at Ft. McKinney. The general in charge of the 6th Cavalry felt that tensions were too high for the prisoners to remain in the area. Hundreds of armed locals sympathetic to both sides of the conflict were said to have gone to Ft. McKinney over the next few days under the mistaken impression the Invaders were being held there.

The Johnson County attorney began to gather evidence for the case and the details of the WSGA's plan emerged. Canton's gripsack was found to contain a list of seventy alleged rustlers who were to be shot or hanged, a list of ranch houses the Invaders had burned, and a contract to pay each Texan five dollars a day plus a bonus of $50 for each person killed. The Invader's plans reportedly included the eventual murder of people as far away as Casper and Douglas. The Times reported on April 23 that "the evidence is said to implicate more than twenty prominent stockmen of Cheyenne whose names have not been mentioned heretofore, also several wealthy stockmen of Omaha, as well as to compromise men high in authority in the State of Wyoming. They will all be charged with aiding and abetting the invasion, and warrants will be issued for the arrest of all of them."

The Invaders, however, were protected by a friendly judicial system, and they took advantage of the cattle barons' corruption. Charges against the men "high in authority" in Wyoming were never filed. Eventually they were released on bail and were told to return to Wyoming for the trial. Many fled to Texas and were never seen again. By January 1893, efforts to get justice for the invasion ended in failure at a Cheyenne courtroom. The Invaders went free after the charges were dropped on the excuse that Johnson County refused to pay for the costs of the long prosecution. The costs of housing the men at Fort D.A. Russell were said to exceed $18,000 and the sparsely populated Johnson County was unable to pay for them

== Final killings ==
Tensions in Johnson County remained high. On May 9, 1892 U.S. Marshal George Wellman was ambushed and killed by locals en route to the town of Buffalo. The incident received national attention, with Wellman being the only marshal to die in the war. Wellman had been one of the hired guns who joined the Invaders, and his death was grieved by a large crowd. The Sixth Cavalry, sent to relieve the county of its violence, was said to be influenced by intense local political and social pressure, and were unable to keep the peace. One infamous event occurred when a group of men set fire to the post exchange and planted a homemade bomb in the cavalry's barracks. Notable officer Charles B. Gatewood was seriously injured by the ensuing bomb blast, shattering his left arm and ending his cavalry career.

The Ninth Cavalry of "Buffalo Soldiers" was ordered to Fort McKinney to replace the Sixth, commanded by Major Charles S. Isley. In a fortnight the Buffalo Soldiers moved from Nebraska to the rail town of Suggs, where they created "Camp Bettens" to quell the local population. Reception from the settlers was negative and in one violent incident a gunfight erupted between them and some Buffalo Soldiers who entered the town. After being initially driven off, 20 more soldiers slipped from the camp to exact revenge, but the locals fought back, resulting in the death of one Buffalo Soldier named Private Willis Johnson, and the wounding of two other soldiers. The brief skirmish became known as the Battle of Suggs. Two companies were sent and this time the locals allowed the soldiers to investigate but no one was convicted. Another buffalo soldier by the name of Brown was also murdered, when a cowboy shot him while both were in a rifle range. Johnson and Brown were buried next to each other, and the hostility forced the Army to retire the regiment from the place in November 1892. Phil DuFran, a range detective and member of the Invaders, disappeared.

On October 1, 1892, two alleged horse rustlers named Jack Bedford and Dab Burch were gunned down while in custody of range detectives east of the Big Horn River. The suspects escaped to Montana with assistance from Otto Franc, a rancher who had sided with the large cattle company faction. On May 24, 1893, Champion's brother, Dudley, came to Wyoming looking for work and was shot and killed in cold blood. 15 miles (24 km) from Buffalo, Dudley had come across the ranch of Mike Shonsey, who, after seeing him, immediately grabbed a gun and fired at him. A coroner's inquiry ruled Shonsey's actions were self-defense and he was acquitted of murder. Afterwards, Shonsey left the state before the officials could continue with the investigation. A year before Nate Champion's death, Shonsey actually met him near the Beaver Creek Canyon, where a fight almost commenced between the two as Champion suspected that Shonsey was one of the five men who had attacked him in his cabin. He further threatened Shonsey and demanded he give up the names of the rest of the assassins. This event made Shonsey harbor hatred toward Champion and probably toward his brother Dudley as well. Dudley Champion was the last person killed in association with the Johnson County War.

== Aftermath ==
Approximately 20-40 people were killed in the conflict. Emotions ran high for many years afterward. Some considered the large and wealthy ranchers as heroes who had sought what they regarded as justice by using violence to defend what they regarded as their rights to range land and water rights, while others saw the WSGA as heavy-handed outlaw vigilantes running roughshod over the law. A number of tall tales were spun by both sides afterwards to make their actions appear morally justified. Parties sympathetic to the Invaders painted Watson as a prostitute and cattle rustler. They painted Averell as her murderous partner in crime and pimp and Nate Champion as the leader of a vast cattle rustling empire. They claimed that he was a leading member of the fabled "Red Sash Gang" of outlaws that supposedly included the likes of the Jesse James gang, as well as the Hole-in-the-Wall Gang who was said to have operated as a community of criminals.

These claims have since been discredited. While men frequently visited Watson's cabin, this was because she mended clothing for cowboys as a source of income. While some accounts do note that Champion wore a red sash at the time of his death, such sashes were common. The existence of the Red Sash Gang had also been disputed, with many historians such as Mark Boardman believing that they did not exist. On the other hand, the Hole-in-the-Wall Gang that would allegedly terrorize Wyoming was actually formed by Kid Curry only after Champion's death. Parties sympathetic to the smaller ranchers also spun tales that included some of the West's most notorious gunslingers under the employ of the Invaders, including such legends as Tom Horn. Horn did briefly work as a detective for the WSGA in the 1890s but there is little evidence he was involved in the war.

=== Political effects ===
Although many of the leaders of the WSGA's hired force, such as William C. Irvine, were Democrats, the ranchers who had hired the group were tied to the Republican Party and their opponents were mostly Democrats. Many viewed the rescue of the WSGA group at the order of President Harrison (a Republican) and the failure of the courts to prosecute them a serious political scandal with overtones of class war. As a result of the scandal, the Democratic Party became popular in Wyoming for a time, winning the governorship in 1892 and taking control of both houses of the state legislature in that election. Wyoming voted for the Democrat William Jennings Bryan in the 1896 U.S. presidential election, and Johnson County was one of the two counties in the state with the largest Bryan majorities.

=== Economic analysis ===
Historian Daniel Belgrad argued that the war began as a conflict of opposing ideologies in terms of property rights. As centralized range management emerged as a solution to overgrazing, it received opposition from a large majority of American settlers who favored decentralization and the use of private winter pastures. The popular image of the war, however, remains that of vigilantism by aggressive landed interests against small individual settlers defending their rights. Although victorious in their legal battles, the cattle barons eventually relented in their efforts to control the open range. Many prominent leaders and individuals of the WSGA, such as Frank Wolcott, Frank M. Canton and Tom Smith, left the area; and by 1893 the association finally allowed smaller ranchers and farmers to apply for membership. The effects of the war lingered for years, affecting economic growth such as plans to build a railroad through Buffalo, which did not come to fruition.

== Legacy ==
Statue of Nate Champion in Buffalo, Wyoming commemorating the war.

The Johnson County War has been one of the best-known range wars in the American frontier. It has been a popular feature of the Western genre of fiction, which includes literature, films and television shows. The Banditti of the Plains, written in 1894 by witness Asa Mercer, is the earliest record of the Johnson County War. The book was suppressed for many years by the WSGA, who seized and destroyed all but a few of the first edition copies from the 1894 printing; they were rumored to have hijacked and destroyed the second printing as it was being shipped from a printer north of Denver, Colorado. The book was reprinted several times in the 20th century and most recently in 2015. Frances McElrath's 1902 novel The Rustler, took inspiration from the Johnson County War, and was sympathetic to the perspective of the small ranchers.

The Virginian, a seminal 1902 western novel by Owen Wister, took the side of the wealthy ranchers, creating a myth of the Johnson County War, but bore little resemblance to a factual account of the actual characters and events. Jack Schaefer's popular 1949 novel Shane treated themes associated with the Johnson County War and took the side of the settlers. The 1953 film The Redhead from Wyoming, starring Maureen O'Hara, dealt with similar themes; in one scene O'Hara's character is told, "It won't be long before they're calling you Cattle Kate." In the 1968 novel True Grit by Charles Portis, the main character, Rooster Cogburn, was involved in the Johnson County War. In the early 1890s Cogburn had gone north to Wyoming where he was "hired by stock owners to terrorize thieves and people called nesters and grangers... . I fear that Rooster did himself no credit in what they called the Johnson County War."

Films such as Heaven's Gate (1980) and Johnson County War (2002) painted the wealthy ranchers as the villains. The former was a dramatic romance loosely based on historical events, while the latter was based on the 1957 novel Riders of Judgment by Frederick Manfred. The range war was also portrayed in an episode of Jim Davis's syndicated Western television series Stories of the Century, with Henry Brandon as Nate Champion and Jean Parker as Ella Watson. American Heroes Channel presented the Johnson County War in the sixth episode of their Blood Feuds series documentary. The war was also featured in the 8th episode of Kevin Costner's historical documentary entitled Kevin Costner's The West.

Other media that had been influenced by the Johnson County War include the 2009 video game Call of Juarez: Bound in Blood, and the 2020 graphic novel Pulp by Ed Brubaker. The story of the Johnson County War from the point of view of the small ranchers was chronicled by Kaycee resident Chris LeDoux in his song "Johnson County War" on the 1989 album Powder River. The song included references to the burning of the KC Ranch, the capture of the WSGA men, the intervention of the U.S. Cavalry and the release of the cattlemen and hired guns. The Jim Gatchell Memorial Museum in Buffalo featured dioramas and exhibits about the Johnson County War, as well as a 7-foot (2.1 m) bronze statue of Nate Champion. Kaycee, Wyoming, the old site of the KC Ranch, also erected the Hoofprints of the Past Museum to commemorate the war.

== See also ==
- List of feuds in the United States
