= Frank Wolcott =

American judge

Frank Wolcott (1840–1910) was an officer in the Union Army, a law man and a rancher.

== Biography ==
=== Early life ===
Wolcott was born December 13, 1840, in Canandaigua, New York. He served in the Union Army in the Civil War, and was promoted to the rank of major before being discharged in 1866. He then attempted to work for the U.S. Land Office in Kentucky, but left for Wyoming only a few years later for a position as a U.S. Marshal.

=== Johnson County War ===
In Wyoming, Wolcott purchased a ranch near Deer Creek and joined the Wyoming Stock Growers Association (WSGA). Working for the WSGA, he became involved in the Johnson County War. Leading a small band of Regulators that terrorized and killed small ranchers who were obstructing the WSGA's goal of greater consolidation and an end to free homesteading. These ranchers were accused of cattle rustling. The book History of Wyoming by T. A. Larson credits this plan directly to Wolcott, other sources disagree and trace the "lynching bee" to WSGA board members.

After the murder of Nate Champion, the Sheriff of Johnson County hunted down the Regulators at the TA Ranch near Crazy Woman Creek. The Governor of Wyoming requested the assistance of federal troops from President Benjamin Harrison. So with the aid of the 6th Cavalry they were forced to surrender, and were brought in to Fort McKinney. But due to the influence of the WSGA both Wolcott and his Regulators were set free without charge and never held to account for their killing spree.

=== Later life ===
Wolcott became a Justice of the Peace March 39, 1890, with a reputation for harsh sentencing. Four years later he became an agent for the Omaha Stockyards. He died in 1910 in Denver, Colorado. Walcott, Wyoming, is named after him.
