= Asa Mercer =

American politician

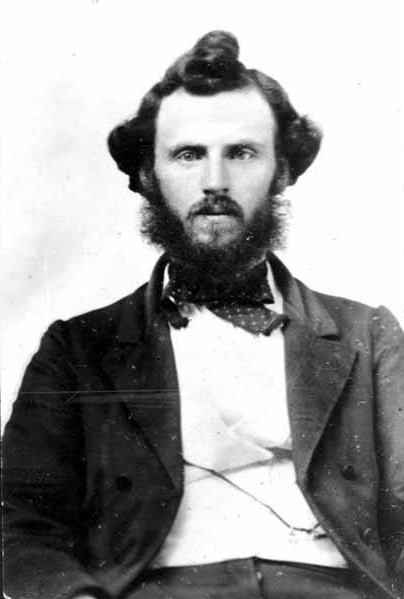

1st President of the Territorial University of Washington
- In office 1861–1863
- Preceded by: Position established
- Succeeded by: William Edward Barnard

Personal details
- Born: Asa Shinn Mercer; June 6, 1839 Princeton, Illinois, U.S.
- Died: August 10, 1917 (aged 78) Buffalo, Wyoming, U.S.
- Education: Franklin College

Asa Shinn Mercer (June 6, 1839 – August 10, 1917) was the first president of the Territorial University of Washington and a member of the Washington State Senate.

He is remembered primarily for his role in three milestones of the old American West: the founding of the University of Washington, the Mercer Girls, and the Johnson County War. Mercer Island in Lake Washington and Mercer Street in Seattle are named not for Asa, but rather his brother Thomas.

Seattle Public Schools operates Asa Mercer International Middle School in Seattle's Beacon Hill neighborhood.

== Early life ==
Mercer was born in Princeton, Illinois. He had twelve older siblings. According to Mercer, he spent time with Abraham Lincoln in his childhood and claimed that Lincoln encouraged him to travel. Mercer's first trip west was in 1852 at age thirteen. In 1860, he attended Franklin College in New Athens, Ohio, returning to Washington on his graduation.

== The University of Washington ==
In 1861, as a member of one of the founding families of Seattle, Washington, a young Asa Mercer assisted his brothers in clearing stumps to make way for the new territorial university.

Besides helping with the foundations of the university, Mercer, being the only college graduate in town, was hired by Daniel Bagley as the university's sole instructor and president. However, Mercer did not receive a salary.

== The Mercer Girls ==
The young town of Seattle was attracting hordes of men to work in the timber and fishing industries, but few marriageable women were willing to make the trip to the remote northwest corner of the United States. In March 1864, with public support and private funding, Mercer traveled to the eastern United States in search of single women to work in Seattle as teachers. On May 16, 1864, he returned to Seattle with eleven women who all found employment as teachers in Seattle. Of these, eight eventually married and settled in the area. This and a subsequent trip introduced dozens of women to the Pacific Northwest, most of whom eventually married local men. The descendants of the Mercer Girls still represent a significant portion of Seattle's citizenry. The Mercer Girls story formed the basis of the television show Here Come the Brides. Mercer himself married one of the Mercer Girls.

== Astoria, Oregon ==
Soon after his marriage, Mercer moved to Oregon where he worked for the federal government in Astoria as a special deputy collector for the customs service. His employment ended in 1867 when he was suspected of being involved in alcohol smuggling, although charges against him were dismissed when key witnesses went missing.

During their time in Oregon, the Mercers purchased three hundred lots in Astoria. Although the real estate endeavor was not lucrative for Mercer, his descendants sold the Astoria properties in 1970 for a substantial sum.

== The Johnson County War ==
Mercer became well known throughout the West as a publisher and eventually found his way to Cheyenne, Wyoming, where he co-founded the Northwestern Livestock Journal (1883-1892), a weekly newspaper which served as a public relations vehicle for the moneyed cattle interests. As Mercer came to see the clearly underhanded treatment of individual ranchers by the cartels, he began to write more scathing accounts of the events that were unfolding on the open range. After the Johnson County War, Mercer switched sides and recounted the invasion in the week's columns on October 12, 1892, just three weeks before elections. Denounced as the author if not the instigator of the plan, his account was told in his book The Banditti of the Plains (1894), which was suppressed in its day and is still difficult to find in public libraries in some parts of the Western U.S.

Following the events of the Johnson County War, his newspaper office was torched by arsonists and the book's entire second edition was hijacked enroute from Denver. Mercer settled into the quiet life of a rancher in Hyattville, Wyoming.

== Personal life ==
Mercer married Annie Elizabeth Stephens, a 26-year-old Irish-Catholic from Baltimore, on July 15, 1866. They had two daughters and six sons; three of their children died in infancy and another as a teenager. Annie Mercer died on October 16, 1900. Asa Mercer died on August 10, 1917, from dysentery.
