= Johnson County War (film) =

- Poster
- Genre: Western
- Based on: Riders of Judgment by Frederick Manfred
- Written by: Larry McMurtry; Diana Ossana
- Directed by: David S. Cass Sr.
- Country of origin: United States
- Original language: English

Original release
- Network: Hallmark Channel
- Release: August 24, 2002

Johnson County War is a 2002 American Western television miniseries. The script was written by Larry McMurtry and Diana Ossana and was about two fictitious families at the time of the Johnson County War (which had formed the backdrop to the film Heaven's Gate).

Filming started in Calgary, Canada, on 12 March 2001 and went until May. Filming took place in Kananasikis Country. The budget was estimated between $10–20 million Canadian.

McMurtry later wrote, "the film had its moments but very few of the actors had theirs — mainly the star, Tom Berenger, who insisted on singing as he was being murdered. We tried to discourage him but he persuaded us and I suspect now that he was right: absurdity is better than nothing, in the movies."

== Cast ==
- Tom Berenger as Cain Hammett
- Luke Perry as Harry Hammett
- Burt Reynolds as Hunt Lawton
- Michelle Forbes as Rory Hammett
- Rachel Ward as "Queenie"
- Adam Storke as Dale Hammett
- Christopher Cazenove as Lord Peter
- Jack Conley as Jesse Jacklin
- Silas Weir Mitchell as Mitch Slaughter
- Fay Masterson as Clara Jager
- Ken Pogue as Wally Tascot
- Blu Mankuma as Hambone
- William Samples as Arthur
- Stephen Bridgewater as Dencil Jager
- Adrien Dorval as Timberline
- Stevie Mitchell as Joey
- Jimmy Herman as Sam-The-Wolfer
- Henry Beckman as Governor Barb
- Ron Hartmann as Senator Thorpe
- Tim Koetting as "Bat" Waldy
- Hal Kerbes as Irv Hornsby
- Paul Coeur as Claybourne Rodney
- Tom Heaton as Sheriff Sine
- Lyle St. Goddard as Avery
- John F. Parker as Russell, of The 'Times'
- Stephen Warner as Spade
- Billy Morton as Ringbone
- David LeReaney as Allen Stone
- Doug Lennox as Ike "Texas Ike"
- Kirk Jarrett as Jimmy Albert
- Joe Norman Shaw as Bobby
- J.C. Roberts as Tom, The Granger
- Jonathan Cole as Jimmy
- Dusty Bews as Casper
- Tom Eirikson as Charlie "Texas Charlie"
- Cameron MacDonald as Cameron "Texas Cam"
- Dan Heather as Danny "Danny Boy"
- Bunk Duncan as Butcherknife

== Reception ==
Variety said "The range is strewn with oaters that just don’t float, but Hallmark Channel gets it right with Johnson County War. Clocking in at four hours, the miniseries-that-isn’t — it’s airing on one night — does its best to revive the small-screen Western, a genre that hasn’t seen a classic in some time... pic has enough machismo sunsets and gunplay to keep viewers hooked despite its extended running time. The problem, however, is that Hallmark just doesn’t draw ’em in."
