= Heaven's Gate (film) =

1980 American Western film by Michael Cimino

- Original theatrical release poster
- Directed by: Michael Cimino
- Written by: Michael Cimino
- Produced by: Joann Carelli
- Starring: Kris Kristofferson; Christopher Walken; John Hurt; Sam Waterston; Brad Dourif; Isabelle Huppert; Jeff Bridges; Joseph Cotten
- Cinematography: Vilmos Zsigmond
- Edited by: Lisa Fruchtman; Gerald Greenberg; William Reynolds; Tom Rolf
- Music by: David Mansfield
- Production company: Partisan Productions
- Distributed by: United Artists
- Release dates: November 19, 1980 (New York City); April 24, 1981 (United States)
- Running time: See Alternative versions
- Country: United States
- Language: English
- Budget: $32—36 million
- Box office: $3.5 million

Heaven's Gate is a 1980 American epic Western film written and directed by Michael Cimino, starring Kris Kristofferson, Christopher Walken, John Hurt, Sam Waterston, Brad Dourif, Isabelle Huppert, Jeff Bridges, and Joseph Cotten, and loosely based on the Johnson County War. It revolves around a dispute between land barons and European immigrants of modest means in Wyoming in the 1890s.

The film's production faced numerous setbacks, including cost overruns, significant retakes, bad press (including allegations of animal abuse on set), and rumors about Cimino's allegedly authoritarian directorial style. Cimino had an expensive and ambitious vision for the film, pushing it nearly four times over its planned budget.

The film premiered in November 1980 and received significant critical backlash, prompting United Artists (UA) to pull it from theaters. In April 1981, a truncated re-cut version was released, though it remained a financial failure, earning only $3.5 million against its $44 million budget, and was lambasted by critics. It was condemned as one of the worst films ever made at the time. According to some film historians such as Peter Biskind, the film's financial losses resulted in the demise of director-driven film production in the American film industry, steering it back toward greater studio control of films. The film's failure also led to Transamerica selling UA to Metro-Goldwyn-Mayer (MGM), ending their existence as an independent studio.

In the decades since its release, however, general assessment of Heaven's Gate has become more favorable. The 1981 re-edit has been characterized as "one of the greatest injustices of cinematic history", while later re-edits have received critical acclaim. In 2015, BBC Culture ranked Heaven's Gate 98th on its list of the 100 greatest American films of all time.

== Plot ==
In 1870, two young men, Jim Averill and Billy Irvine, graduate from Harvard College. The Reverend Doctor speaks to the graduates on the association of "the cultivated mind with the uncultivated" and the importance of education. Irvine, the class orator, follows this with his opposing, irreverent views. After a celebration, the male students serenade the women present, including Averill's girlfriend.

In 1890, Averill is passing through the booming town of Casper, Wyoming, on his way north to Johnson County, where he is now a marshal. Poor European immigrants new to the region are in conflict with wealthy, established cattle barons organized as the Wyoming Stock Growers Association, who suspect the newcomers are stealing their cattle for food. Nate Champion – a friend of Averill and an enforcer for the stockmen – kills a settler for suspected rustling and dissuades another from stealing a cow.

At a board meeting, the head of the Association, Frank Canton, tells members, including a drunk Irvine, of plans to kill 125 named settlers, as thieves and anarchists, with the help of the cruel Major Wolcott. Irvine leaves the meeting, encounters Averill, and tells him of the Association's plans. As Averill leaves, he exchanges bitter words with Canton. Canton and Averill come to blows, and Canton is knocked to the floor. That night, Canton recruits men to kill the settlers.

Ellen Watson, a Johnson County brothel madam from Quebec who accepts stolen cattle as payment for use of her prostitutes, is infatuated with both Averill and Champion. Averill and Watson skate in a crowd, then dance alone, in an enormous roller skating rink called "Heaven's Gate", which has been built by local entrepreneur John L. Bridges. Averill receives a copy of the Association's death list from Minardi, a baseball-playing U.S. Army captain, and later reads the names aloud to the settlers, who are thrown into terrified turmoil. Cully, a station master and friend of Averill's, sees the train with Canton's posse heading north and rides off to warn the settlers, but is murdered en route. Later, a group of men comes to Watson's bordello, slaughters her workers, and rape her. Averill shoots and kills all but one of them. Champion, realizing that his landowner bosses seek to eliminate Watson, goes to Canton's camp and shoots Morrison, the remaining rapist, then refuses to participate in the slaughter.

Canton, Wolcott, and their men encounter one of Champion's friends, who is leaving a cabin with Champion and his friend Nick Ray inside, and a gunfight ensues. Attempting to save Champion, Watson arrives in her wagon and shoots one of the hired guns before escaping on horseback. Nick is killed before Canton's men push a burning cart towards the cabin, setting it on fire. Champion writes a last letter to Ella before emerging from the burning cabin, shooting at Canton's men, but is killed by a hail of bullets. Watson warns the settlers of Canton's approach at another vast, chaotic gathering at "Heaven's Gate". The cowardly mayor of the county, Charlie Lezak, proposes to deliver the people on the list peacefully. At the same time, the young pharmacist Mr. Eggleston claims that the only way to survive is to arm themselves and fight the enemy army. The agitated settlers approve of Eggleston's idea and rush to battle with Bridges and Ella leading them. With the hired invaders now surrounded, both sides suffer casualties (including a drunken, poetic Irvine) as Canton leaves to bring help. Watson and Averill return to Champion's charred and smoking cabin and discover his corpse, along with a handwritten letter documenting his last minutes alive.

The next day, Averill reluctantly joins the immigrant settlers, with their cobbled-together siege machines and explosive charges, in an attack against Wolcott's men and their makeshift fortifications. The battle is fiercer and more desperate. Despite the heavy losses that the immigrants suffer, including Eggleston himself, they manage to inflict a vast number of casualties on the mercenaries' army. Wolcott himself, while trying to escape, is killed by Averill, who hits him with an explosive charge. Before the settlers wipe out the enemies, the US Army arrives with Canton and Minardi, thereby stopping the battle. The mercenaries are arrested, though Averill knows this is just a facade to save them and keep them from facing a criminal charge. Later, at Watson's cabin, Bridges, Watson, and Averill prepare to leave for good, but Canton and two others ambush them. Averill and Bridges shoot and kill Canton, and one of his men, but both Bridges and Watson are killed. A grief-stricken Averill holds Watson's body in his arms.

In 1903, a well-dressed, beardless, but older-looking Averill walks the deck of his yacht off Newport, Rhode Island. He goes below, where an attractive middle-aged woman sleeps in a luxurious boudoir. The woman, Averill's old Harvard girlfriend (perhaps now his wife), awakens and asks him for a cigarette. Silently, he complies, lighting the cigarette and returning to the deck.

== Cast ==
- Kris Kristofferson as James Averill
- Christopher Walken as Nathan D. Champion
- John Hurt as Billy Irvine
- Sam Waterston as Frank M. Canton
- Brad Dourif as Mr. Eggleston
- Isabelle Huppert as Ellen Watson
- Joseph Cotten as The Reverend Doctor
- Jeff Bridges as John L. Bridges
- Geoffrey Lewis as Trapper
- Paul Koslo as Mayor Lezak
- Richard Masur as Cully
- Terry O'Quinn as Captain Minardi
- Robin Bartlett as Mrs. Lezak
- Tom Noonan as Jake

In addition, musician Ronnie Hawkins appears in the first of his few acting roles, as Major Wolcott; the film's composer David Mansfield appears onscreen as John DeCory, the leader of the Heaven's Gate Band and an employee of Ella; Rosie Vela (credited as Roseanne Vela) appears as the "Beautiful Girl" whom Averill falls for at Harvard; future Golden Globe winner and Academy Award nominee Mickey Rourke appears in his second-ever screen role as Nick Ray; and future multi-Academy Award nominee Willem Dafoe makes his first, uncredited, screen appearance as Willy.

== Production ==
=== Historical basis ===
The basic plot elements of the film were inspired by Wyoming's 1892 Johnson County War, the archetypal cattlemen–homesteaders conflict, which also served as the background for Shane and The Virginian. Most of the film's principal characters bear the names of figures in the war but the events portrayed in Heaven's Gate bear little resemblance to historical events.

==== Inaccuracies ====
Homesteaders began to settle northern Wyoming in the 1890s, claiming land under the Homestead Acts, but there were no hordes of starving European immigrants killing rich men's cattle to feed their families, as depicted in the film. Nate Champion is portrayed as a murderer and "enforcer" for the stockmen, but he was a popular small rancher in Johnson County, nicknamed "king of the rustlers" by the stockmen because he resisted their tactic of claiming all unbranded young cattle as their own.

Jim Averell was another homesteader who lived about 100 miles (160 km) southwest of Johnson County. Two years before the invasion began, he and his wife Ellen Watson were murdered by stockmen, who falsely accused Watson of exchanging sexual favors for stolen cattle. There is no evidence that Watson was a bordello madam, as portrayed in the film, nor that Watson or Averell ever knew Nate Champion.

=== Screenplay ===
In 1971, film director Michael Cimino submitted an original script for Heaven's Gate (then called The Johnson County War), but the project was shelved when it failed to attract big-name talent, including John Wayne, who turned down the lead role. A third version of the script was submitted to 20th Century Fox before the release of The Deer Hunter. His directorial debut, Thunderbolt and Lightfoot (1974), was a hit. In 1979, on the eve of winning two Academy Awards (Best Director and Best Picture) for 1978's The Deer Hunter at the 51st Academy Awards, Cimino convinced United Artists (UA) to resurrect the Heaven's Gate project with Kris Kristofferson, Isabelle Huppert, and Christopher Walken as the main characters. He was given an initial budget of $11.6 million, but was also provided with carte blanche. Cimino's girlfriend, Joann Carelli, was hired to produce the film.

=== Filming ===
Cimino and his friends searched through 20,000 miles of land for scenery for the film. Principal photography began on April 16, 1979, in Glacier National Park, east of Kalispell, Montana, with the majority of the town scenes filmed in the Two Medicine area, north of the village of East Glacier Park. Shooting also included the town of Wallace, Idaho. Harvard University refused to allow the film to be shot there, reportedly because of Cimino's excessive demands for the film set, and the film's prologue was instead shot at the University of Oxford. The project had a December 14 projected release date and $11.6 million budget, and promptly fell behind schedule.

=== Production issues ===
According to legend, by the sixth day of filming the project was already five days behind schedule.

==== Cimino's perfectionism ====
Kristofferson compared Cimino to Ingmar Bergman and Federico Fellini. Steven Bach compared him to Michelangelo and said that "I am confident we'll make our money back on it". As an example of Cimino's fanatical attention to detail, a street built to his precise specifications had to be torn down and rebuilt because it reportedly "didn't look right." The street in question needed to be 6 feet (1.8 m) wider; the set construction boss said it would be cheaper to tear down one side and move it back six feet, but Cimino insisted that both sides be dismantled and moved back 3 feet (0.91 m), then reassembled. An entire tree was cut down, moved in pieces, and relocated to the courtyard in Oxford, England, where the Harvard 1870 graduation scene was shot. Cimino had an irrigation system built under the land where the major battlefield scene would unfold so that it would remain vividly green, to contrast with the red color.

Cimino shot more than 1.3 million feet (400,000 metres; nearly 220 hours) of footage, costing the studio approximately $200,000 per day in salary (equivalent to $720,000 in 2022), locations and acting fees. Privately, it was joked that Cimino wished to surpass Francis Ford Coppola's mark of shooting one million feet of footage for Apocalypse Now (1979).

Cimino's obsessive behavior soon earned him the nickname "The Ayatollah". Production fell behind schedule as rumors spread of Cimino's demanding up to 50 takes of individual scenes and delaying filming until a cloud that he liked rolled into the frame. As a result of the delays, several musicians originally brought to Montana to work on the film for only three weeks ended up stranded, waiting to be called for shoots to materialize. The experience, as the Associated Press put it, "was both stunningly boring and a raucous good time, full of jam sessions, strange adventures and curiously little actual shooting." The jam sessions served as the beginning of numerous musical collaborations between Bridges and Kristofferson. John Williams turned down the chance to compose the score for the film, which eventually went to David Mansfield.

As production staggered forward, United Artists seriously considered firing Cimino and replacing him with another director, implied in the book Final Cut to be Norman Jewison.

Actor John Hurt reportedly spent so long waiting around on the production for something to do that he went off and made The Elephant Man (1980) for David Lynch in the interim, and then came back to shoot more scenes on Heaven's Gate.

==== Filming completes ====
Heaven's Gate finished shooting in March 1980, having cost nearly $32 million. Reportedly, during post-production Cimino changed the lock to the studio's editing room, prohibiting executives from seeing the film until he completed his cut, although Cimino disputed this story. William Reynolds, one of the editors for the film, told CinemaEditor Magazine in 1991 that he saw problems with the film and wanted the producers to look over the film. Reynolds was instead ignored before being told to "shut up" since they did not have enough time.

=== Post-production ===
On June 26, 1980, Cimino previewed a workprint for executives at United Artists that reportedly ran five hours and twenty-five minutes (325 minutes), which Cimino said was "about 15 minutes longer than the final cut would be."

The executives flatly refused to release the film at that length and once again contemplated firing Cimino. However, Cimino promised them he could re-edit the film and spent the entire summer and fall of 1980 doing so, finally paring it down to its original premiere length of three hours and 39 minutes (219 minutes). The original wide-release opening on Christmas of 1979 had come and gone, so UA and Cimino finally set up a release date of November 1980.

== Release ==
United Artists spent $1.5 million advertising the film during the three weeks before its premiere. During an intermission at the film's November 19, 1980, premiere at the New York Cinema 1 theater, the audience was so subdued that Cimino was said to have asked why no one was drinking the champagne. He was reportedly told by his publicist, "Because they hate the movie, Michael." After a sparsely attended one-week run, Cimino asked United Artists to pull the film from any further releases, completely postponing a full worldwide release. On April 24, 1981, the film opened in 810 theatres in a "director's cut", a two-hour-and-twenty-nine minute (149 minute) version that Cimino had recut for a third time.

=== Box office ===
Following a brief theatrical release in November 1980, during which the film was poorly received by critics, United Artists decided to pull the film from theaters, re-releasing it in April 1981 in a truncated cut. Despite the efforts to capitalize on the film with a re-release, it was a significant financial failure. The film grossed $1.3 million in its opening weekend and closed after the second week, having grossed only $3.5 million against its total $44 million budget – including marketing. The film is considered one of the biggest box office bombs of all time. Bach claimed that the film needed to make $140 million (equivalent to $547,051,696 in 2025) to break even.

=== Critical response ===
The initial critical reception to the film was almost universally and fiercely negative. The New York Times critic Vincent Canby panned the film, calling it "something quite rare in movies these days - an unqualified disaster," comparing it to "a forced four-hour walking tour of one's own living room." Canby went even further by stating that "[i]t fails so completely that you might suspect Mr. Cimino sold his soul to the devil to obtain the success of The Deer Hunter and the Devil has just come around to collect."

Reviewing the shorter cut in the Chicago Sun-Times, Roger Ebert criticized the film's formal choices and its narrative inconsistencies and incredulities, concluding that the film was "[t]he most scandalous cinematic waste I have ever seen, and remember, I've seen Paint Your Wagon." He also heavily criticized the cinematography, calling the film one of the ugliest he'd ever seen. Ebert stated that he was initially in disbelief over the vast negative reception from critics but admitted after seeing the film that "it was as bad as everybody said." On Sneak Previews, Ebert's co-host Gene Siskel, who saw both the original and shorter cut, also panned the film calling it a "turkey" and pinpointed the film's failure on the illogical character choices. Kevin Thomas of the Los Angeles Times issued a dissenting opinion when he reviewed the shortened film, becoming one of its few American champions and calling it "a true screen epic" while stating that in two decades as a critic, he had never felt "so totally alone." Thomas' paper actually had its former lead film critic and editor come out of retirement to write a thoroughly negative front-page review of the movie for its Arts section, and moved Thomas' positive review to an interior page of that section.

In 1999, Time placed the film on a list of the 100 worst ideas of the 20th century.

Writing in The Guardian in 2008, Joe Queenan declared Heaven's Gate the worst film made up to that time. "This is a movie that destroyed the director's career," he wrote. "This is a movie that lost so much money it literally drove a major American studio out of business. This is a movie about Harvard-educated gunslingers who face off against eastern European sodbusters in an epic struggle for the soul of America. This is a movie that stars Isabelle Huppert as a shotgun-toting cowgirl. This is a movie in which Jeff Bridges pukes while mounted on roller skates. This is a movie that has five minutes of uninterrupted fiddle-playing by a fiddler who is also mounted on roller skates. This is a movie that defies belief."

The Verge said: "Based on 30 years of critical assessment, Heaven's Gate stands as one of the worst movies ever made. That's not an exaggeration".

==== Reassessments and legacy ====
In subsequent years, some critics have come to the film's defense, beginning with European critics who praised it after the film played at the 1981 Cannes Film Festival. Robin Wood was an early champion of Heaven's Gate and its reassessment, calling it "one of the few authentically innovative Hollywood films ... It seems to me, in its original version, among the supreme achievements of the Hollywood cinema." David Thomson calls the film "a wounded monster" and argues that it takes part in "a rich American tradition (Melville, James, Ives, Pollock, Parker) that seeks a mighty dispersal of what has gone before. In America, there are great innovations in art that suddenly create fields of apparent emptiness. They may seem like omissions or mistakes at first. Yet in time we come to see them as meant for our exploration." Martin Scorsese has said that the film has many overlooked virtues. Some of these critics have attempted to impugn the motives of the earliest reviewers. Robin Wood noted, in his initial review of the film, reviewers tended to pile on the film, attempting to "outdo [each] other with sarcasm and contempt." Several members of the cast and crew have complained that the initial reviews of the film were tainted by its production history and that daily critics were reviewing it as a business story as much as a motion picture. In April 2011, the staff of Time Out London selected Heaven's Gate as the 12th greatest Western of all time. While Peter Biskind covered the many excesses and problems with the movie in his book Easy Riders, Raging Bulls, he also noted that Heaven's Gate was not dissimilar to other big-budget, troubled projects of the late 1970s and early 1980s (such as Steven Spielberg's 1941 and Warren Beatty's Reds), and that the backlash against Heaven's Gate could have easily been directed elsewhere. Biskind speculated that Michael Cimino's personal unpopularity was the main reason this film became so widely reviled. Philip French praised the film in his original review.

In 2012, the film was re-released to "soak up acclaim" as a 216-minute "director's cut" at the 69th Venice Film Festival. on August 30 in the presence of Cimino, followed one month later by screening at the New York Film Festival in the "Masterwork" lineup, along with Laurence Olivier's Richard III and Frank Oz's director's cut of Little Shop of Horrors. It was then shown at the Festival Lumière in France, where Venice Festival director Alberto Barbera described the film as an "absolute masterpiece" that had disappeared, and whose 1980 cutting was characterized as a "massacre" by nervous producers and had been "one of the greatest injustices of cinematic history" that had destroyed careers (Cimino and Kristofferson) following "annihilat[ing]" critical reviews.

In March 2013, the new director's cut was again featured back in New York City in a week-long run screening at the Film Forum. Writing in The New York Times, critic Manohla Dargis said of the restoration that it "looks good projected, if surprisingly bright", and "it also appears to be an act of directorial revisionism." Of the film itself she writes: "The film's scope, natural backdrops, massive sets, complex choreography and cinematography are seductive, at times stunning, and if you like watching swirling people and cameras, you may love it."

An article by Nicholas Barber on the BBC website in December 2015 traced the history of the critical reception of Heaven's Gate and concludes: "so much of Heaven's Gate is patently splendid that it is mind-boggling that anyone could pronounce it an 'unqualified disaster'. And the scenes which were slammed in 1980 as being symptomatic of waste and excess – the Harvard waltz, the massed rollerskating – are the scenes which take your breath away." Reflecting on the depicted negative attitudes to immigrants, he writes: "However unwelcome Heaven's Gate may have been in 1980, there hasn't been a more urgently topical film in 2015." The film holds a 57% score on Rotten Tomatoes based on 46 reviews with an average rating of 6.6/10. The website's critical consensus reads: "Heaven's Gate contains too many ideas and striking spectacle to be a disaster, but this western buckles under the weight of its own sprawl." On Metacritic, the film has a weighted average score of 57 out of 100, based on 15 critics, indicating "average or mixed reviews".

== Controversies ==
=== Effect on the U.S. film industry ===
The film's $44 million cost ($140 million in 2024 dollars) and poor performance at the box office ($3.5 million gross in the United States) generated more negative publicity than actual financial damage, causing Transamerica Corporation, United Artists' corporate owner, to become anxious over its own public image and to abandon film production altogether. In 1981, Transamerica sold United Artists to Kirk Kerkorian, who also owned Metro-Goldwyn-Mayer (MGM), which effectively ended United Artists' existence as an independent studio. United Artists has since been a subsidiary of MGM. While the money lost due to Heaven's Gate was considerable, United Artists was still a thriving studio with a steady income provided by the James Bond, Pink Panther and Rocky franchises. On the other hand, United Artists was already struggling after an executive walkout in 1978 and several other major box office flops in 1980, including Cruising, Foxes, and Roadie.

The fracas had a wider effect on the American film industry. During the 1970s, relatively young directors such as Coppola, Scorsese, Peter Bogdanovich, George Lucas, William Friedkin and Steven Spielberg had been given large budgets with very little studio control (see New Hollywood). However, the directors' power lessened considerably as a result of disappointing box-office performers such as Friedkin's Sorcerer (1977) and Cruising (1980), Coppola's One from the Heart, and Cimino's Heaven's Gate. The studios ultimately shifted focus from director-driven films and adopted high-concept features, epitomized by Jaws and Star Wars (both released before Heaven's Gate). As the new high-concept paradigm of filmmaking became more entrenched, studio control of budgets and productions became tighter, ending the free-wheeling excesses that had begotten Heaven's Gate.

=== Accusations of cruelty to animals ===
The film was marred by accusations of cruelty to animals during production. The American Humane Association (AHA), barred from monitoring the animals on set, issued press releases detailing the abuses and organized boycott picket lines. The outcry prompted the Screen Actors Guild (SAG) and the Alliance of Motion Picture and Television Producers (AMPTP) to contractually authorize the AHA to monitor the use of all animals in all filmed media afterward.

One assertion was that steers were bled from the neck without giving them pain killers so that their blood could be collected and smeared upon the actors in a scene. The AHA asserted that four horses were killed and many more injured during a battle scene, along with accusations that one of the horses was blown up with dynamite.

According to the AHA, the owner of an abused horse filed a lawsuit against the producers, director, Partisan Productions, and the horse wrangler. The owner cited wrongful injury and breach of contract for willfully depriving her Arabian gelding of proper care. The suit cited "the severe physical and behavioral trauma and disfigurement" of the horse. The case was settled out of court.

There were accusations of actual cockfights, decapitated chickens, and a group of cows disemboweled to provide "fake intestines" for the actors.

During the production of the film, two well-known one-year-old grizzly bears disappeared from river valley where some of the shooting was taking place. The bears were known to the local community and biologists for regularly grazing near popular roads and had been previously tagged with radio transmitters. The bodies of the bears were never found, but one radio transmitter was discovered in a pile of brush cleared by road crews, having been cut from the ear of the animal. Rumours circulated throughout the community that the bears were shot by an extra from the film.

The film is listed on AHA's list of unacceptable films. The AHA protested the film by distributing an international press release detailing the assertions of animal cruelty and asking people to boycott it. AHA organized picket lines outside movie theaters in Hollywood while local humane societies did the same across the USA. Though Heaven's Gate was not the first film to have animals killed during its production, it is believed that the film was largely responsible for sparking the now-common use of the "No animals were harmed ..." disclaimer and more rigorous supervision of animal acts by the AHA, which had been inspecting film production since the 1940s. This is also one of the films to not have the end credit disclaimer.

The UK Blu-ray release from Second Sight Films removes about a minute of footage relating to cockfights and animal cruelty. Prior video releases removed about a minute and fourteen seconds of the cruelty.

== Versions of the film ==
There are several different versions of the film:

1. Workprint cut: 325 minutes
  - Print for studio executives, early 1980
2. Initial "Premiere" Release: 219 minutes
  - Cinema release, November 1980, aborted after 1 week
  - Shown on Z Channel cable, 1982, as "The Director's cut"
  - Released on VHS and LaserDisc by MGM as "The Legendary Uncut Version", later released on DVD in 2000
3. Director's Second edit: 149 minutes
  - Wide cinema release, April 1981
  - Released on DVD in France and the Netherlands
4. Radical Cut: 219 minutes
  - 2005 special screening in Paris and New York
  - Reassembled by MGM with available high-quality footage (using alternative footage where required)
5. Digitally restored Director's Cut: 216 minutes
  - Restored in 2012 for the 69th Venice Film Festival, followed by a BD & DVD release.
  - Based on the initial release with the intermission removed and slightly shortened.
  - This cut removes the cinematography's sepia tint which is present on all previous versions.

=== Workprint cut, premiere cut and an alternative cut ===
Notwithstanding the 325-minute "workprint" cut shown to executives in June 1980, Cimino had rushed through post-production and editing to meet his contractual requirements to United Artists, and to qualify for the 1980 Academy Awards. The version screened at the November 1980 premiere ran three hours and 39 minutes. Bridges joked that Cimino had worked on the film so close to the premiere that the print screened was still wet from the lab.

After the aborted one-week premiere run in New York, Cimino and United Artists pulled the film; Cimino wrote an open letter to the studio that was printed in several trade papers blaming unrealistic deadline pressures for the film's failure. United Artists reportedly also hired its own editor to try to edit Cimino's footage into a releasable film with no real success.

Ultimately, Cimino's second edited version, a 149-minute version, premiered in April 1981 and was the only cut of the film screened in wide release. The original negative for the longer version no longer exists because it was directly edited for the 149-minute version (YCM separation masters of the longer version were used as the source for The Criterion Collection release). This cut of the film is not just shorter but differs radically in the placement of scenes and selection of takes. This version, after leaving theaters, was not released on home video of any kind in the United States but was later released on DVD in France (La Porte du Paradis). This version has also aired on the MGM HD cable channel and was available free-with-ads on US streaming provider Tubi from March to November 2017.

In 1982, Z Channel aired the 219-minute 1980 premiere version of the film on cable television – the first time that the longer version was widely exhibited – and which Z Channel dubbed the "director's cut". As critic F.X. Feeney noted in the documentary Z Channel: A Magnificent Obsession, Z Channel's broadcast of Heaven's Gate first popularized the concept of a "director's cut".

When MGM (which acquired the rights to United Artists' catalog after its demise) released the film on VHS and videodisc in the 1980s, it released Cimino's 219-minute cut with the tagline "Heaven's Gate ... The Legendary Uncut Version". Subsequent releases on LaserDisc and DVD have contained only the 219-minute cut.

Due to the wide availability of the 219-minute 1980 premiere version of Heaven's Gate and its frequent labeling as either "uncut" or the "director's cut", Cimino insisted that the so-called "original version" did not fully correspond to his intentions and that he was under pressure to bring it out for the predetermined date and did not consider the film ready, making even the 219-minute version essentially an "unfinished" film.

The 216-minute version shown in Venice is quite similar to the 219-minute version, but with no intermission. Some shots in the second part are slightly shorter and a shot with a single line has been cut (just after John Hurt is beaten by Sam Waterston).

=== 149-minute cut ===
In the 149-minute version of Heaven's Gate released in 1981, the following scenes are cut:

- Billy Irvine (Hurt)'s speech at the Harvard graduation
- The co-ed circle dancing immediately following graduation
- James Averill (Kristofferson) beating up the brute enforcer (who beats up the immigrant in front of his wife and children)
- Averill passing the beaten man's widow in the carriage, asking her how she's doing
- The spitting fight between the two immigrant landowners in the cockfight scene
- The entire roller skating dance scene
- A shot of female immigrants carrying a load up the hill
- Nate Champion (Walken) almost shooting the stock grower that insults Ella Watson (Huppert)
- The scene where Watson first leaves Champion to return to Averill
- The introductory part of the scene where Averill reads the names on the "death list". The edited version starts with John Bridges (Bridges) firing the gun in the air, to restore order
- Averill weeping to Bridges that he "hates getting old," while looking at the old photo of himself and his girlfriend
- The immigrants being informed that Averill quit his post, and Watson warning them the stock growers have arrived
- The last five or so minutes of the second battle scene, including the footage of the character crushed under the wagon and the woman killing him in mercy
- That same woman killing herself after the battle, and Bridges and Averill surveying the carnage
- Any reference to the woman on the boat, presumably Averill's girlfriend or wife, from the end of the film

=== 2005 radical cut ===
In 2005, MGM released the film in selected cinemas in the United States and Europe. The 219-minute cut was reassembled by MGM archivist John Kirk, who reported that large portions of the original negative had been discarded, making this an all-new radical version using whatever alternative available scenes that could be found. The restored print was screened in Paris and presented to a sold-out audience at New York's Museum of Modern Art with a live introduction by Isabelle Huppert. Because the project was commissioned by then-MGM executive Bingham Ray, who was ousted shortly thereafter, the budget for the project was cut and a planned wider release and DVD never materialized, with the project since being abandoned altogether.

=== 2012 digitally restored Director's Cut ===
In 2012, MGM released yet another version, digitally restored and 216 minutes long. It premiered at the 2012 Venice Film Festival as part of the Venice Classics series.

The Criterion Collection released the restored 216-minute version on Blu-ray and DVD on November 20, 2012. This "Director's Cut" was personally supervised by Michael Cimino and Joann Carelli. Cimino explains in the special features portion of the DVD that this is his preferred version of the film, and he feels it is the complete version that he intended to make.

=== 2014 Steven Soderbergh's "The Butcher's Cut" ===
On April 21, 2014, director, cinematographer, and editor Steven Soderbergh released an unofficial alternate cut of Heaven's Gate via his website extension765.com, under his pseudonym Mary Ann Bernard. Soderbergh's version, which runs 108 minutes, is dubbed "The Butcher's Cut".

== Accolades ==
Award	Date of Ceremony	Category	Recipients	Results	Ref.
Cannes Film Festival	May 13–27, 1981	Palme d'Or	Michael Cimino	Nominated	
Academy Awards	March 29, 1982	Best Art Direction	Art Direction: Tambi Larsen; Set Decoration: James L. Berkey	Nominated	
Golden Raspberry Awards	March 29, 1982	Worst Picture		Nominated	
Golden Raspberry Awards	March 29, 1982	Worst Director	Michael Cimino	Won	
Golden Raspberry Awards	March 29, 1982	Worst Actor	Kris Kristofferson	Nominated	
Golden Raspberry Awards	March 29, 1982	Worst Screenplay	Michael Cimino	Nominated	
Golden Raspberry Awards	March 29, 1982	Worst Musical Score	David Mansfield	Nominated	
Stinkers Bad Movie Awards	1982	Worst Picture		Nominated	
Stinkers Bad Movie Awards	2007 (expanded ballot)	Worst Director	Michael Cimino	Won	
Stinkers Bad Movie Awards	2007 (expanded ballot)	Worst Screenplay	Michael Cimino	Nominated	
Stinkers Bad Movie Awards	2007 (expanded ballot)	Most Intrusive Musical Score	David Mansfield	Nominated	

== See also ==
- List of biggest box-office bombs
- List of 20th century films considered the worst
- Revolution (1985) – a historical epic film, starring Al Pacino, that was also made by a high-profile director (Hugh Hudson); it, too, was a failure on release and led to problems for its studio. Since then, it has received a new cut that was more positively reviewed.
- Johnson County War (2002) – a film about two fictitious families at the time of the Johnson County War
