= Crazy Woman Creek =

River in Wyoming, United States

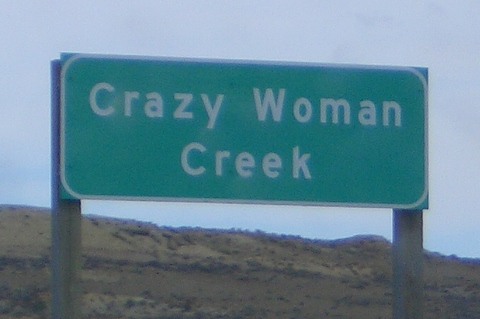
- Interactive map of Crazy Woman Creek
- Location: Johnson County, Wyoming
- Coordinates: 44°29′0″N 106°7′56″W
- Type: Creek
- River sources: Powder River
- Surface area: 926.982 kilometres (576.000 mi)

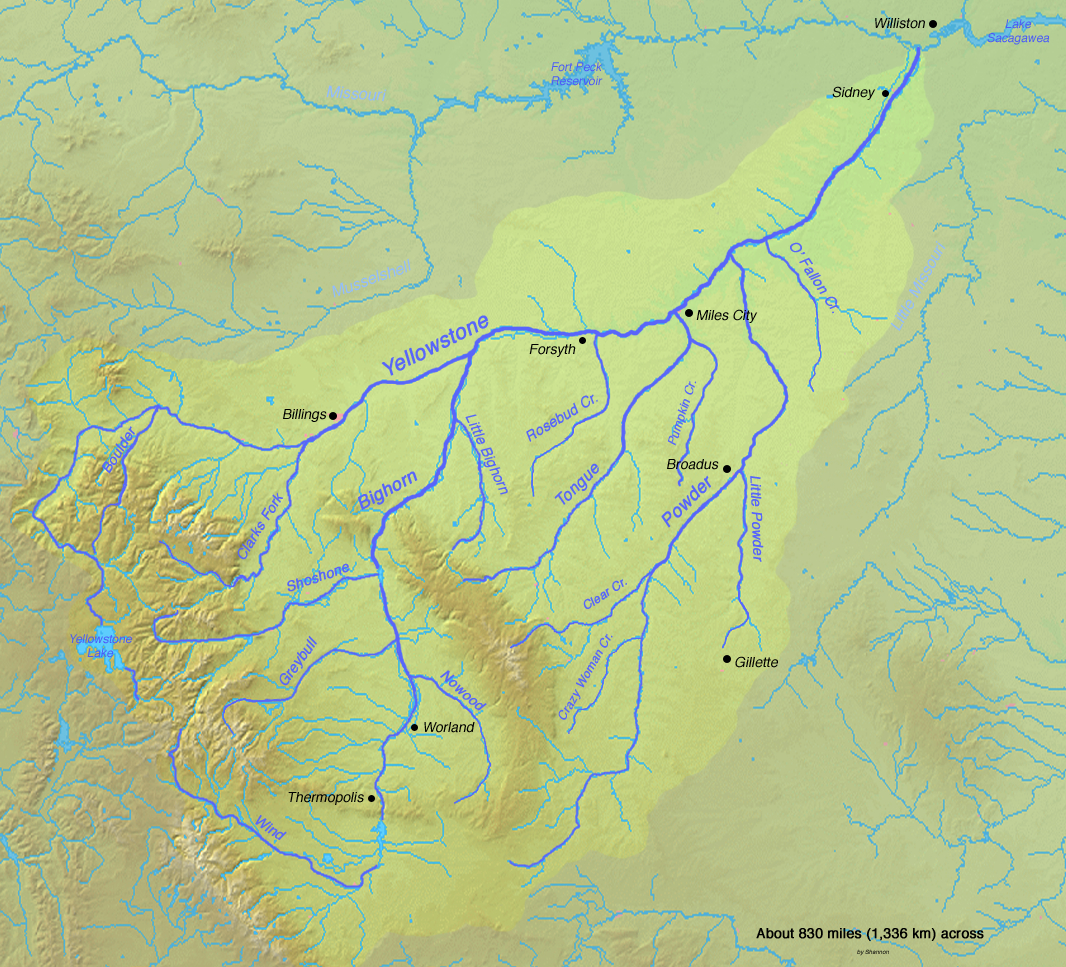
Crazy Woman Creek is a tributary of the Powder River

Crazy Woman Creek is a creek in the United States, in Johnson County, Wyoming.

There are several legends about the name. It was the site of a trading post and the site of battles in the American Indian Wars. It was also a locale of the Johnson County War, in which cattle barons started ruthlessly persecuting alleged rustlers in the area through hired killers.

An FAA-operated VOR navigation beacon, named after this area, is located about 7 miles (11 km) southeast of the creek. Crazy Woman VOR's FAA three-letter station designator is CZI.

The creek that winds and twists for a long distance is large enough that it is broken into three sections, an upper, middle and lower section.

== External links and references ==
- travel-to-wyoming.com on Crazy Woman Creek
- More on the battle
- crazywomantradingco.com
- U.S. Geological Survey Geographic Names Information System: Crazy Woman Creek

Specific
