= Barnum, Wyoming =

- Place
- Location of Barnum in Wyoming Barnum (the United States)
- Coordinates: 43°39′51″N 106°54′34″W
- Country: United States
- State: Wyoming
- County: Johnson
- Elevation: 5,177 ft (1,578 m)
- Time zone: UTC-7 (MST)
  - Summer (DST): UTC-6 (MDT)
- ZIP code: 82639
- GNIS feature ID: 1597214

Barnum is an unincorporated place in the southwestern part of Johnson County in north-central Wyoming, United States. It lies in the eastern valleys of the Bighorn Mountains. Barnum is at the western terminus of Wyoming Highway 190, approximately 17 miles west of the Kaycee exit off Interstate 25 (with U.S. Route 87).

Mayoworth is several miles north of Barnum, and Big Trails is the nearest place over the Bighorn range.

Barnum lies on the Middle Fork of the Powder River. The Middle Fork of the Powder River Recreation Area provides access to canyonlands, hiking, and fishing.

== History ==
Middle Fork of the Powder River Recreation Area preserves prehistoric cairn lines, stone circles, quarry sites, caves, work sites, and rock art.

Nearby Dull Knife Battlefield is the site of an 1876 battle between the U.S. Army and Cheyenne.

From the late 1860s to about 1910, the Hole-in-the-Wall mountain pass was used by outlaws such as Butch Cassidy. Several gangs kept a cabin nearby. Outlaw Cave lies in the Middle Fork Canyon.
