= Mayoworth, Wyoming =

Mayoworth, Wyoming Mayoworth Junction
- Place
- Location of Mayoworth in Wyoming
- Coordinates: 43°49′55″N 106°47′31″W
- Country: United States
- State: Wyoming
- County: Johnson
- Elevation: 5,230 ft (1,590 m)
- Time zone: UTC-7 (MST)
  - Summer (DST): UTC-6 (MDT)
- ZIP code: 82639
- GNIS feature ID: 1597396

Mayoworth is an unincorporated place in the southwestern part of Johnson County in north-central Wyoming, United States. It lies in the eastern valleys of the Bighorn Mountains. Mayoworth is at the western terminus of Wyoming Highway 191, approximately 12 miles west of the Kaycee exit off Interstate 25 (with U.S. Route 87).

Mayoworth is on the North Fork of the Powder River, which experienced severe flooding in 1992.

The Mayoworth Number Ten clay mine is just to the northwest of town.

Barnum is several miles south of Mayoworth, and Big Trails is the nearest place over the Bighorn range.

== History ==
Nearby Dull Knife Battlefield is the site of an 1876 battle between the U.S. Army and Cheyenne known as "The Battle of Little Bighorn".

From the late 1860s to about 1910, the Hole-in-the-Wall mountain pass was used by outlaws such as Butch Cassidy. Several gangs kept a cabin nearby.

Mayoworth is named after May Marie Jones (1869-1942) and William Worthington (1860-1902). It’s a combination of their two names.
