= Wyoming Highway 191 =

State highway in Wyoming, United States

Wyoming Highway 191
- Mayoworth Road
- WYO 191 highlighted in red

Route information
- Maintained by WYDOT
- Length: 11.71 mi (18.85 km)

Major junctions
- West end: Mayoworth Road in Mayoworth
- East end: WYO 196 / WYO 192 in Kaycee

Location
- Country: United States
- State: Wyoming
- Counties: Johnson

Highway system
- Wyoming State Highway System; Interstate; US; State
← US 191	→ WYO 192

Wyoming Highway 191 (WYO 191) is an 11.71-mile-long (18.85 km) state highway in Johnson County, Wyoming.

== Route description ==
Wyoming Highway 191 begins its western end in the community of Mayoworth, located northwest of Kaycee. From there WYO 191 travels southeast towards Kaycee. Nearing its end the eastern terminus of Wyoming Highway 190 (Barnum Road), which serves the outlying community of Barnum, is intersected before meeting an interchange with I-25/US 87 at exit 254 in Kaycee. 0.16 miles (0.3 km) later WYO 191 reaches its eastern terminus at Wyoming Highway 196 and the western terminus of Wyoming Highway 192 (Sussex Road) in Kaycee.

== Major intersections ==
The entire route is in Johnson County.

Location	mi	km	Destinations	Notes
Mayoworth	0.00	0.00	Mayoworth Road	Western terminus of WYO 191
Kaycee	10.62	17.09	WYO 190	Eastern terminus of WYO 190
Kaycee	11.55	18.59	I-25 / US 87 – Casper, Billings	Exit 254 (I-25/US 87)
Kaycee	11.71	18.85	WYO 196 / WYO 192	Eastern terminus of WYO 191; Western terminus of WYO 192
1.000 mi = 1.609 km; 1.000 km = 0.621 mi
