= Wyoming Highway 190 =

State highway in Wyoming, United States

Wyoming Highway 190
- Barnum Road
- WYO 190 highlighted in red

Route information
- Maintained by WYDOT
- Length: 9.66 mi (15.55 km)

Major junctions
- West end: Barnum Road in Barnum
- East end: WYO 191 in Kaycee

Location
- Country: United States
- State: Wyoming
- Counties: Johnson

Highway system
- Wyoming State Highway System; Interstate; US; State
← US 189	→ US 191

Wyoming Highway 190 (WYO 190) is a 9.66-mile-long (15.55 km) state highway in Johnson County, Wyoming.

== Route description ==
Wyoming Highway 190 begins its western end at the small settlement of Barnum, located southwest of Kaycee. Named Barnum Road, Highway 190 travels roughly east-northeast toward Kaycee following the Middle Fork of the Powder River. At 9.66 miles, WYO 190 reaches it eastern end at Wyoming Highway 191 (Mayoworth Road) in Kaycee. Exit 254 of I-25/US 87 can be accessed via WYO 191 less than a mile east of Highway 190's terminus.

Wyoming Highway 190 provides access to the Middle Fork Recreation Area near Barnum.

== Major intersections ==
The entire route is in Johnson County.

Location	mi	km	Destinations	Notes
Barnum	0.00	0.00	Barnum Road	Western Terminus of WYO 190
Kaycee	9.66	15.55	WYO 191	Eastern Terminus of WYO 190
1.000 mi = 1.609 km; 1.000 km = 0.621 mi
