= HF Bar Ranch Historic District =

Historic district in Wyoming, United States

- U.S. National Register of Historic Places
- U.S. Historic district
- Location within Wyoming Location within the United States
- Location: Johnson County, Wyoming, USA
- Nearest city: Buffalo, Wyoming
- Coordinates: 44°27′31″N 106°53′59″W
- Built: 1911
- NRHP reference No.: 84000392
- Added to NRHP: November 07, 1984

The HF Bar Ranch is located in Johnson County, Wyoming about 20 miles (32 km) northwest of Buffalo, Wyoming in the foothills of the Bighorn Mountains near Saddlestring, Wyoming. The ranch is a working cattle ranch comprising about 36 buildings, built between 1898 and 1921. The ranch is associated with Wyoming state senator and U.S. Congressman Frank O. Horton, who purchased it in 1911 with financial help from his investment banker brother-in-law and sister-in-law, Warren and Demia Gorrell. The Gorrells and their children spent summers in Wyoming, while the Hortons stayed year-round.

The ranch includes a number of guest cabins built by the Hortons, Gorrells and their friends, who used the property as a guest ranch and a working ranch. Cabins are arranged along the banks of Rock Creek with a main house for the Hortons and a club house. Ranch structures are scattered through the site as well, with dormitories for wranglers. Most of the cabins are of log or rustic frame design.

The most significant building is the club house (1924), of log construction with a prominent front porch. Its hipped roof is supported by pine trunks and it features stone fireplaces. An office cabin built between 1911 and 1920 is also the Saddlestring post office. Two houses for Frank Horton and his son Jack are of stucco. Three cabins, known as the Salt Creek Cabins, were moved to the ranch from the Salt Creek Oil Field in the 1930s and were used to house wranglers.

The HF Bar Ranch was placed on the National Register of Historic Places in 1984.
