= Buckaroo =

A buckaroo is a cowboy of the Great Basin and California region of the United States, from an Anglicization of the Spanish word vaquero.

Buckaroo or Buckaroos may also refer to:

== Music ==
- The Buckaroos, the backing band for country singer Buck Owens
  - "Buckaroo" (instrumental), a 1965 instrumental by Buck Owens and the Buckaroos
- "Buckaroo" (song), a song from the self-titled debut album by country singer Lee Ann Womack

== Teams ==
- Kelowna Buckaroos (1961–1983), a former Tier II Junior "A" ice hockey team from Kelowna, British Columbia, Canada
  - Summerland Buckaroos (1983–1988), the name of the team after relocating to Summerland, British Columbia
- Port Coquitlam Buckaroos (1999–2006), an ice hockey team based in Port Coquitlam, British Columbia
- Pendleton Buckaroos (1912–1914), a team in the short-lived professional baseball Western Tri-State League
- Portland Buckaroos, several defunct ice hockey teams which were based in Portland, Oregon
- Buckaroos, the sports teams and mascot of Breckenridge High School, Breckenridge, Texas
- Buckaroos, the sports teams and mascot of Monticello High School in Monticello, Utah
- Buckaroos, the sports teams and mascot of Kaycee School , Kaycee, Wyoming

== Other uses ==
- Buckaroo Banzai (character), in the film The Adventures of Buckaroo Banzai Across the 8th Dimension and the Battletech fictional universe
- Buckaroo: The Winchester Does Not Forgive, a 1968 Italian Spaghetti Western film
- Buckaroo!, a children's game made by the Milton Bradley company
- Temco T-35 Buckaroo, an unsuccessful low-cost 1940s trainer aircraft
- Friendship knot, also known as a buckeroo knot
- Buckaroo Broadcasting, LLC, former license owner of radio station KWNA-FM, serving Winnemucca, Nevada
- Buckaroo (horse), an American Thoroughbred racehorse and leading sire
- Nailbiter (comic) takes place in the fictional town of Buckaroo, Oregon
- Slang term for dollar

== See also ==
- "Bronze Buckaroo", a nickname given to actor and singing movie cowboy Herb Jeffries (1913–2014)
