= Johnson County School District Number 1 =

School district in Wyoming, United States

Johnson County School District #1 is a public school district based in Buffalo, Wyoming, United States.

== Geography ==
Johnson County School District #1 serves all of Johnson County, including the following communities:

- Incorporated places
  - City of Buffalo
  - Town of Kaycee
- Unincorporated places
  - Linch
  - Saddlestring

== Schools ==
- Buffalo High School (Grades 9–12)
- Clear Creek Middle School (Grades 6–8)
- Cloud Peak Elementary School (Grades 4–5)
- Meadowlark Elementary School (Grades K-3)
- Kaycee School (Grades K-12)

== Student demographics ==
The following figures are as of October 1, 2008.

- Total District Enrollment: 1,222
- Student enrollment by gender
  - Male: 629 (51.47%)
  - Female: 593 (48.53%)
- Student enrollment by ethnicity
  - White (not Hispanic): 1,165 (95.34%)
  - Hispanic: 30 (2.45%)
  - American Indian or Alaskan Native: 13 (1.06%)
  - Asian or Pacific Islander: 8 (0.65%)
  - Black (not Hispanic): 6 (0.49%)

== See also ==
- List of school districts in Wyoming
