= Wyoming Highway 196 =

State highway in Wyoming, United States

Wyoming Highway 196
- WYO 196 highlighted in red

Route information
- Maintained by WYDOT
- Length: 49.84 mi (80.21 km)

Major junctions
- South end: I-25 / US 87 south of Kaycee
- North end: I-25 BL / US 87 Bus. in Buffalo

Location
- Country: United States
- State: Wyoming
- Counties: Johnson

Highway system
- Wyoming State Highway System; Interstate; US; State
← WYO 194	→ WYO 210
← US 85	→ US 89

Wyoming Highway 196 (WYO 196) is a 49.84-mile-long (80.21 km) north–south Wyoming State Road that travels through central Johnson County, closely paralleling Interstate 25 (I-25). WYO 196 travels from I-25 and U.S. Route 87 (US 87) at exit 249 south of Kaycee to I-25 Business/US 87 Business in Buffalo near Exit 298.

== Route description ==
Wyoming Highway 196 begins at exit 249, 4.5 miles (7.2 km) south of Kaycee at the TTT Interchange with Interstate 25 and U.S. Route 87. Highway 196 heads north as it parallels I-25 and enters the town of Kaycee from the south assuming the name Nolan Avenue through the community. The western terminus of Wyoming Highway 192 (Sussex Road) and the eastern terminus of Wyoming Highway 191 (Mayoworth Road) is intersected in the community. Exit 254 of Interstate 25 can be accessed via WYO 191. WYO 196 continues north out of Kaycee, and north of there crosses under I-25/US 87 and parallels the highway to the west. Along its routing to Buffalo, no major highways are intersected besides local roadways, some of which provide access to the exits of I-25/US 87 between Kaycee and Buffalo.

WYO 196 enters the city of Buffalo from the south and ends at Interstate 25 Business/US 87 Business (S. Main Street). Exit 298 of I-25/US 87 can be accessed via I-25 BUS/US 87 BUS south.

== History ==
Wyoming Highway 196 is the former routing of U.S. Route 87 prior to realignment along Interstate 25.

== Major intersections ==
The entire route is in Johnson County.

Location	mi	km	Destinations	Notes
	0.00	0.00	I-25 / US 87 – Casper, Billings	Southern terminus; I-25 exit 249
Kaycee	4.50	7.24	WYO 192 east WYO 191 west to I-25 / US 87	Western terminus of WYO 192; eastern terminus of WYO 191; West to I-25 exit 254
	16.35	26.31	Reno Road to I-25 / US 87	East to I-25 exit 265
	31.79	51.16	Middle Fork Road to I-25 / US 87	East to I-25 exit 280
	42.59	68.54	Trabing Road to I-25 / US 87	East to I-25 exit 291
Buffalo	49.84	80.21	I-25 BL / US 87 Bus. to I-25 / US 87	Northern terminus; east to I-25 exit 298
1.000 mi = 1.609 km; 1.000 km = 0.621 mi
