= Wyoming Highway 192 =

State highway in Wyoming, United States

Wyoming Highway 192
- Sussex Road
- WYO 192 highlighted in red

Route information
- Maintained by WYDOT
- Length: 35.64 mi (57.36 km)

Major junctions
- West end: WYO 196 / WYO 191 in Kaycee
- East end: WYO 387 south of Linch

Location
- Country: United States
- State: Wyoming
- Counties: Johnson

Highway system
- Wyoming State Highway System; Interstate; US; State
← WYO 191	→ WYO 193

Wyoming Highway 192 (WYO 192) is a 35.64-mile-long (57.36 km) state highway in southeastern Johnson County, Wyoming.

== Route description ==
Wyoming Highway 192 begins its western end in Kaycee at an intersection with Wyoming Highway 196 (Nolan Avenue) and the eastern terminus of Wyoming Highway 191 (Mayoworth Road). Exit 254 of Interstate 25/U.S. Route 87, which lies just west of here, can be accessed via WYO 191 . WYO 192 travels predominantly east out of Kaycee into outlying areas before turning south and then southeast for the remainder of its routing. Nearing its end, WYO 192 passes through the unincorporated community of Linch before ending at Wyoming Highway 387 south of there at 35.64-mile (57.4 km).

== Major intersections ==
The entire route is in Johnson County.

Location	mi	km	Destinations	Notes
Kaycee	0.00	0.00	WYO 191 west to I-25 / US 87	Continuation beyond western terminus
Kaycee	0.00	0.00	WYO 196	
	19.29	31.04	WYO 387	
1.000 mi = 1.609 km; 1.000 km = 0.621 mi
