= Wolf, Wyoming =

- Unincorporated community
- Location within the state of Wyoming Wolf, Wyoming (the United States)
- Coordinates: 44°46′18″N 107°14′20″W
- Country: United States
- State: Wyoming
- County: Sheridan
- Elevation: 4,626 ft (1,410 m)
- Time zone: UTC-7 (Mountain (MST))
  - Summer (DST): UTC-6 (MDT)
- ZIP codes: 82844
- GNIS feature ID: 1604593

Wolf is an unincorporated community in Sheridan County, Wyoming, United States. Its elevation is 4,626 feet (1,410 m). Although Wolf is unincorporated, it had a post office, with the ZIP code of 82844 which closed in 1993. Public education in the community of Wolf is provided by Sheridan County School District #2.
