= Linch, Wyoming =

- Unincorporated community
- Location within Wyoming Location within the United States
- Coordinates: 43°36′23″N 106°11′46″W
- Country: United States
- State: Wyoming
- County: Johnson
- Elevation: 4,958 ft (1,511 m)
- Time zone: UTC-7 (Mountain (MST))
  - Summer (DST): UTC-6 (MDT)
- ZIP codes: 82640
- GNIS feature ID: 1590693

Linch is an unincorporated community in southeastern Johnson County, Wyoming, United States. It lies along WYO 192 southeast of the city of Buffalo, the county seat of Johnson County. Although Linch is unincorporated, it has a post office, with the ZIP code of 82640.

Public education in the community of Linch is provided by Johnson County School District #1. Linch also has a branch of the Johnson County Library.

Linch was named for Wilfrid Bruce Linch (1895-1968). Oil was discovered near Linch in 1947, and is the primary business.
