= Story, Wyoming =

- CDP
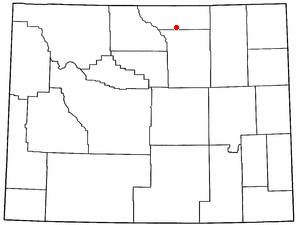
- Location of Story, Wyoming

- Location in the United States
- Coordinates: 44°34′02″N 106°53′32″W
- Country: United States
- State: Wyoming
- County: Sheridan

Area
  - Total: 7.1 sq mi (18 km^{2})
  - Land: 7.1 sq mi (18 km^{2})
  - Water: 0.0 sq mi (0 km^{2})
- Elevation: 5,233 ft (1,595 m)

Population (2020)
  - Total: 903
  - Density: 130/sq mi (49/km^{2})
- Time zone: UTC-7 (Mountain (MST))
  - Summer (DST): UTC-6 (MDT)
- ZIP code: 82842
- Area code: 307
- FIPS code: 56-73615
- GNIS feature ID: 2410006

Story is a census-designated place (CDP) in Sheridan County, Wyoming, United States. As of the 2020 census, the CDP population was 903.

== History of the region ==
The story of Story concerns the history of the American Frontier and the Old West and of the conflicts between early settlers and the Plains Indians. The historic Bozeman Trail passed nearby in the mid-1860s, and Fort Phil Kearny, now a State Historic Site, lies just 5 miles south of town. Fort Mackenzie (Wyoming) was just to the north, near what is now the city of Sheridan.

Fort Phil Kearny, known to the Plains Indians as the "hated post on the Little Piney", played an important role in Red Cloud's War (1866-1868), and the area around the fort was the site of the Fetterman massacre and the Wagon Box Fight. The Fetterman Fight (with 81 men killed on the U.S. side) was the worst military defeat suffered by the U.S. Army on the Great Plains, until the Battle of the Little Bighorn ten years later.

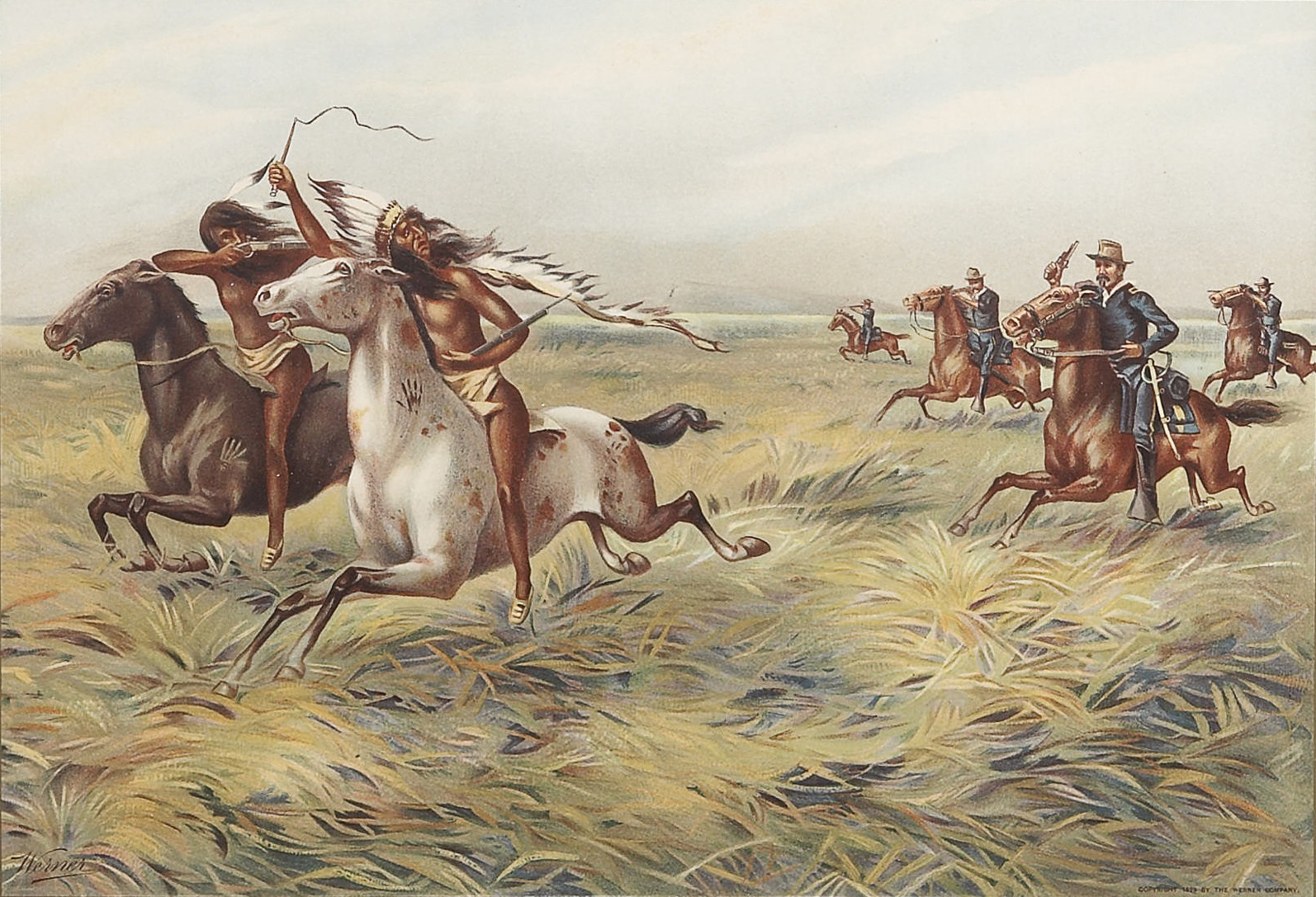
U.S. Army Cavalry soldiers engaged in the "Indian Wars" of the Mid-19th Century American West

The 1866 Fetterman Fight marked a key victory of the Lakota, Cheyenne, and Arapaho Indians over soldiers of the United States Army, and the 1867 Wagon Box Fight involved Lakota Sioux and soldiers from nearby Fort Phil Kearny. Fort Phil Kearny, including the nearby sites of the Fetterman engagement and the Wagon Box Fight, was designated a National Historic Landmark in 1960.

With the advent of the automobile in the early 1900s, the area around Story became, and has remained, a popular destination in Wyoming for tourists, Boy Scout troops and others for camping, fishing, and other outdoor recreational activities.

== Geography ==
Banner lies three miles to the northeast, and the Bighorn Mountains (and Bighorn National Forest) are to Story's west. The town is accessible via U.S. Route 87 (cosigned with Wyoming Highway 193).

According to the United States Census Bureau, the census-designated place has a total area of 7.1 square miles (18.46 km^{2}), all land.

=== Wildlife ===
White-tailed deer thrive and flourish and groups of them often stroll down the streets or lounge on people’s lawn. There are also lots of turkeys. Mountain lions and black bears exist in the areas surrounding the community.

=== Climate ===
According to the Köppen Climate Classification system, Story has a warm-summer humid continental climate, abbreviated "Dfb" on climate maps.

Climate data for Story, Wyoming, 1991–2020 normals, extremes 2000–present
Month	Jan	Feb	Mar	Apr	May	Jun	Jul	Aug	Sep	Oct	Nov	Dec	Year
Record high °F (°C)	72 (22)	67 (19)	74 (23)	79 (26)	88 (31)	100 (38)	100 (38)	97 (36)	96 (36)	86 (30)	75 (24)	71 (22)	100 (38)
Mean maximum °F (°C)	59.0 (15.0)	56.7 (13.7)	64.7 (18.2)	73.3 (22.9)	80.1 (26.7)	88.2 (31.2)	92.1 (33.4)	91.9 (33.3)	87.8 (31.0)	77.5 (25.3)	67.5 (19.7)	58.6 (14.8)	93.5 (34.2)
Mean daily maximum °F (°C)	38.4 (3.6)	37.4 (3.0)	44.5 (6.9)	52.5 (11.4)	60.1 (15.6)	70.4 (21.3)	80.7 (27.1)	79.9 (26.6)	70.0 (21.1)	56.2 (13.4)	45.2 (7.3)	37.2 (2.9)	56.0 (13.4)
Daily mean °F (°C)	26.5 (−3.1)	25.6 (−3.6)	32.6 (0.3)	40.5 (4.7)	48.8 (9.3)	57.9 (14.4)	66.6 (19.2)	65.2 (18.4)	55.9 (13.3)	43.7 (6.5)	33.5 (0.8)	25.6 (−3.6)	43.5 (6.4)
Mean daily minimum °F (°C)	14.5 (−9.7)	13.8 (−10.1)	20.8 (−6.2)	28.5 (−1.9)	37.6 (3.1)	45.4 (7.4)	52.6 (11.4)	50.5 (10.3)	41.8 (5.4)	31.3 (−0.4)	21.9 (−5.6)	14.0 (−10.0)	31.1 (−0.5)
Mean minimum °F (°C)	−10.5 (−23.6)	−10.7 (−23.7)	0.1 (−17.7)	13.2 (−10.4)	26.8 (−2.9)	35.1 (1.7)	43.5 (6.4)	41.1 (5.1)	30.6 (−0.8)	12.7 (−10.7)	0.5 (−17.5)	−9.7 (−23.2)	−19.5 (−28.6)
Record low °F (°C)	−20 (−29)	−26 (−32)	−24 (−31)	−3 (−19)	14 (−10)	28 (−2)	33 (1)	33 (1)	22 (−6)	−11 (−24)	−14 (−26)	−27 (−33)	−27 (−33)
Average precipitation inches (mm)	1.29 (33)	1.45 (37)	2.34 (59)	3.74 (95)	4.67 (119)	2.82 (72)	1.64 (42)	1.25 (32)	2.26 (57)	3.32 (84)	1.54 (39)	1.34 (34)	27.66 (703)
Average snowfall inches (cm)	18.2 (46)	18.5 (47)	22.9 (58)	24.2 (61)	4.9 (12)	0.3 (0.76)	0.0 (0.0)	0.0 (0.0)	2.2 (5.6)	13.0 (33)	16.3 (41)	17.8 (45)	138.3 (349.36)
Average precipitation days (≥ 0.01 in)	8.8	9.9	10.1	12.6	13.1	11.8	9.1	8.4	7.9	10.2	8.4	8.0	118.3
Average snowy days (≥ 0.1 in)	9.0	9.9	8.5	7.1	2.0	0.1	0.0	0.0	0.6	4.6	7.3	8.4	57.5
Source 1: NOAA
Source 2: National Weather Service (mean maxima and minima 2006–2020)

== Demographics ==
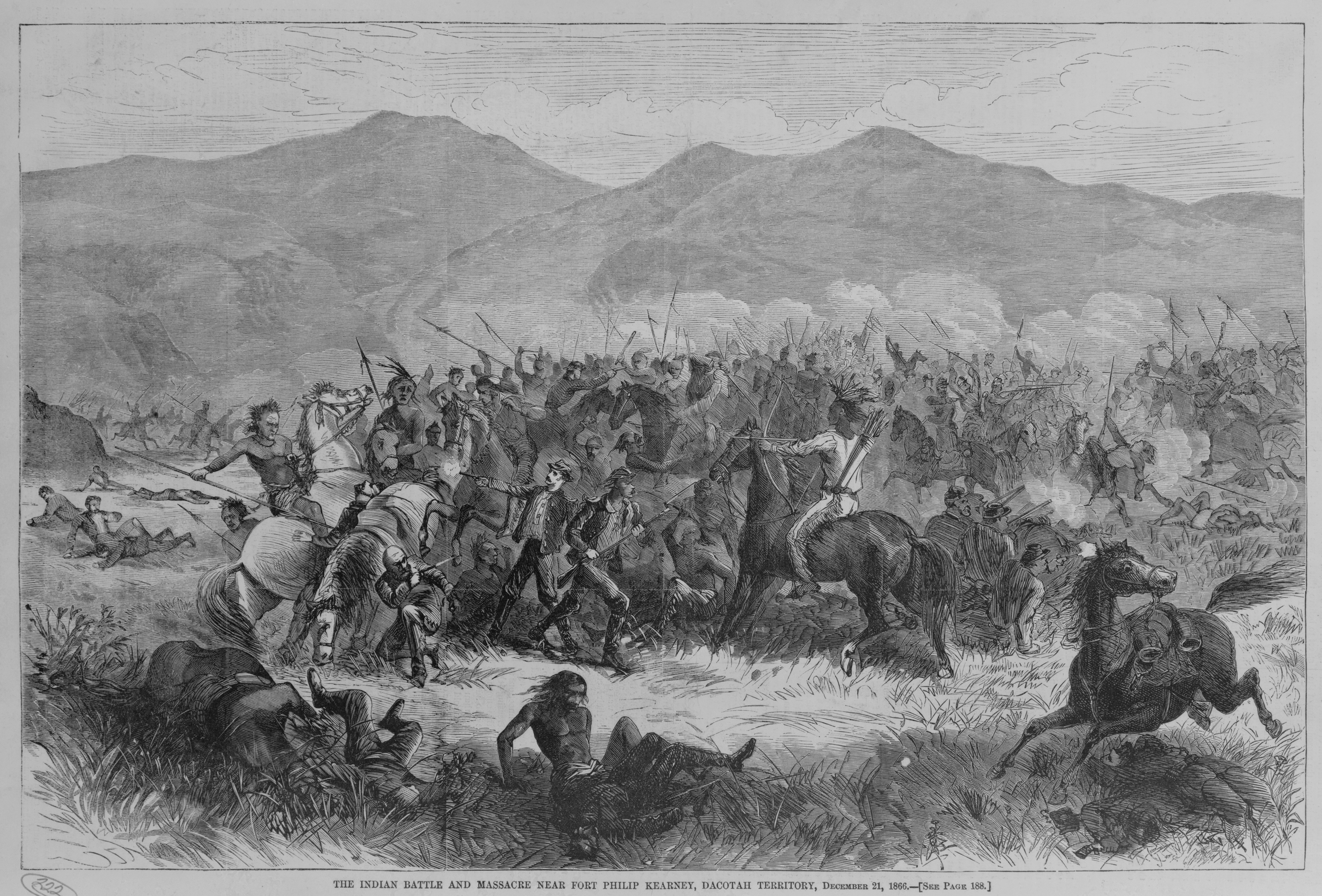
The Fetterman engagement near Fort Phil Kearny, 1866

As of the census of 2000, there were 887 people, 420 households, and 272 families residing in the CDP. The population density was 64.6 people per square mile (24.9/km^{2}). There were 667 housing units at an average density of 48.6/sq mi (18.7/km^{2}). The racial makeup of the CDP was 98.87% White, 0.11% African American, 0.34% Native American, 0.23% Asian, 0.23% from other races, and 0.23% from two or more races. Hispanic or Latino of any race were 1.35% of the population.

There were 420 households, out of which 20.5% had children under the age of 18 living with them, 57.1% were married couples living together, 4.3% had a female householder with no husband present, and 35.2% were non-families. 30.0% of all households were made up of individuals, and 13.1% had someone living alone who was 65 years of age or older. The average household size was 2.11 and the average family size was 2.56.

In the CDP, the population was spread out, with 17.4% under the age of 18, 4.2% from 18 to 24, 21.2% from 25 to 44, 34.9% from 45 to 64, and 22.3% who were 65 years of age or older. The median age was 48 years. For every 100 females, there were 109.2 males. For every 100 females age 18 and over, there were 103.0 males.

The median income for a household in the CDP was $33,125, and the median income for a family was $45,000. Males had a median income of $29,028 versus $23,958 for females. The per capita income for the CDP was $20,053. About 12.1% of families and 15.3% of the population were below the poverty line, including 18.6% of those under age 18 and 11.5% of those age 65 or over.

== Education ==
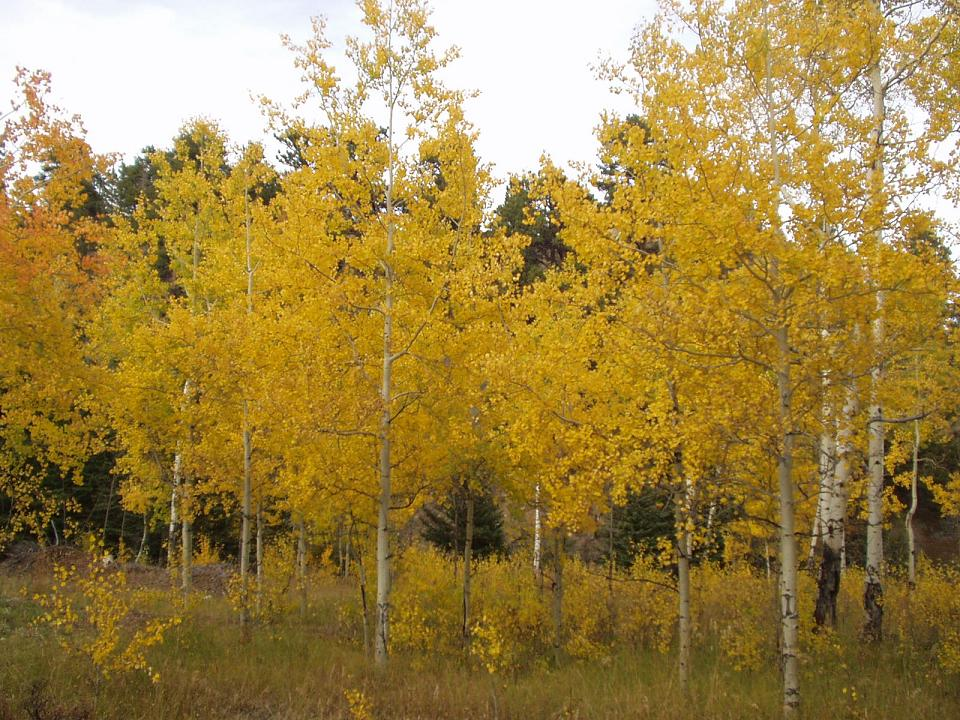
Autumn in the Bighorn Mountains

Public education in the community of Story is provided by Sheridan County School District #2. Although Story's census-designated place (CDP) boundary extends onto land that is zoned to Sheridan County School District #1, the populated areas are served by Sheridan County School District #2.

Story Elementary School is located in the community and serves students in grades K-5. Secondary school students attend Sheridan Junior High School (grades 6-8) and Sheridan High School (grades 9-12), which are located in nearby Sheridan.

Story has a public library, a branch of the Sheridan County Public Library System.

== Fire and rescue ==
The Story Volunteer Fire Rescue Department provides fire suppression and rescue services for the heavily forested community of Story and the surrounding area, which is designated as by the State of Wyoming as the Story Fire Protection District.

== Fish hatchery and visitor center ==
The Wyoming State Game & Fish Department operates a fish hatchery and visitor center, which is open to the public, on South Piney Creek, two miles west of Story on Fish Hatchery Road - State Route 194.

== Transportation ==
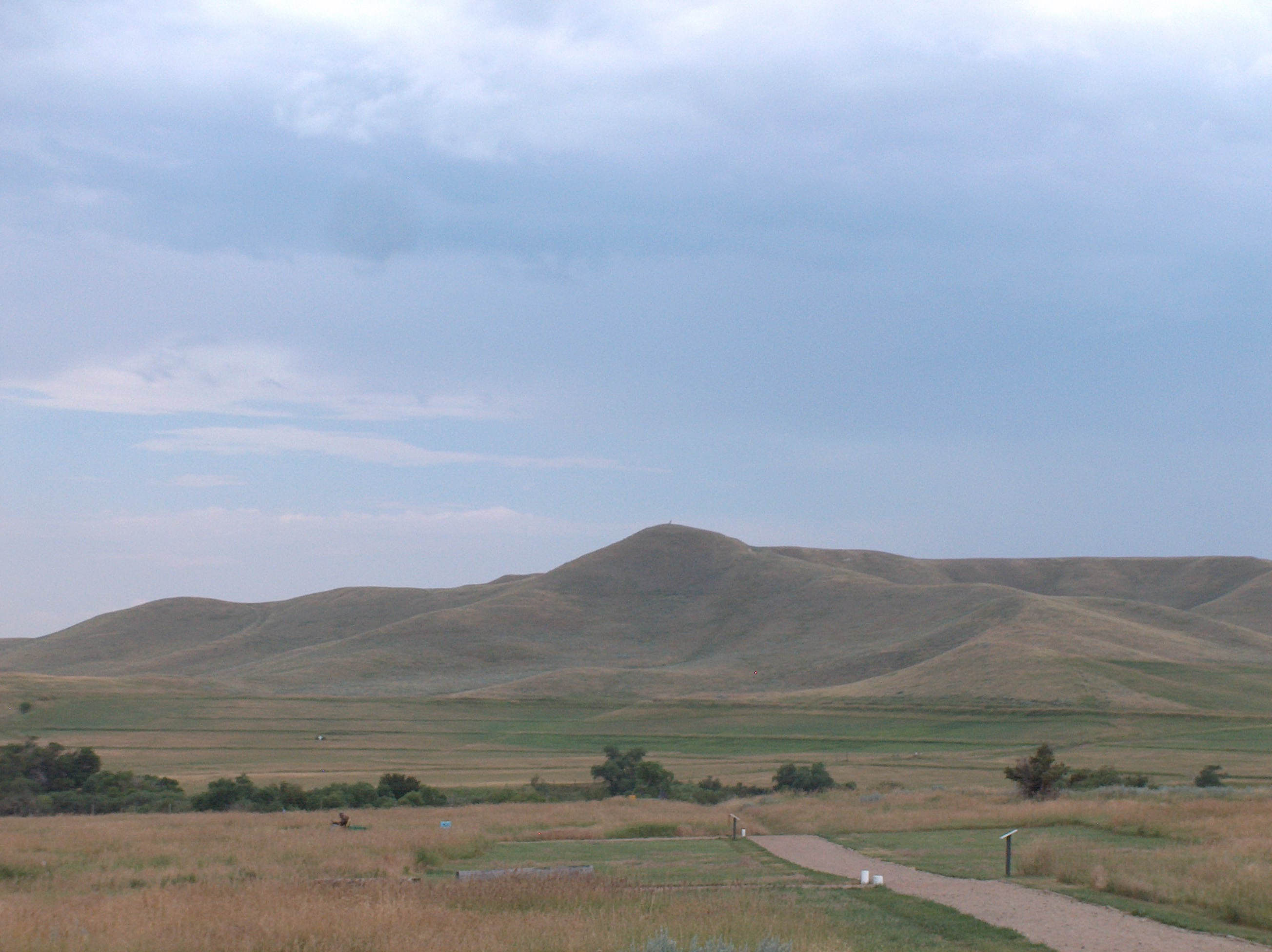
Pilot Hill near Fort Phil Kearny as seen from U.S. Highway 87

=== Highways ===
- U.S. Highway 87
- WYO 193 (Sheridan Highway)
- WYO 194 (Fish Hatchery Road)
- WYO 340 (North Piney Road)

In the late 1990s, a section of US 87 between Buffalo and Sheridan near Pilot Hill was closed due to recurring landslides, and State Route 193 began being used as an alternate route. The State of Wyoming petitioned the American Association of State Highway and Transportation Officials (AASHTO) to officially reroute US 87 over Highway 193, but AASHTO denied the petition. Since then, an officially designated detour for US 87 has followed Highway 193 through Story, and it appears unlikely US 87 will be reconstructed in the foreseeable future due to additional, and recurring landslides in the area, as well as the potential costs.

=== Airports ===
The Sheridan County Airport is 14 miles north of Story, just south of Sheridan, with direct passenger flights available daily to Denver. The other two nearest airports are Worland Muni Airport and Gillette-Campbell County Airport.
