= Dull Knife Battlefield =

- U.S. National Register of Historic Places
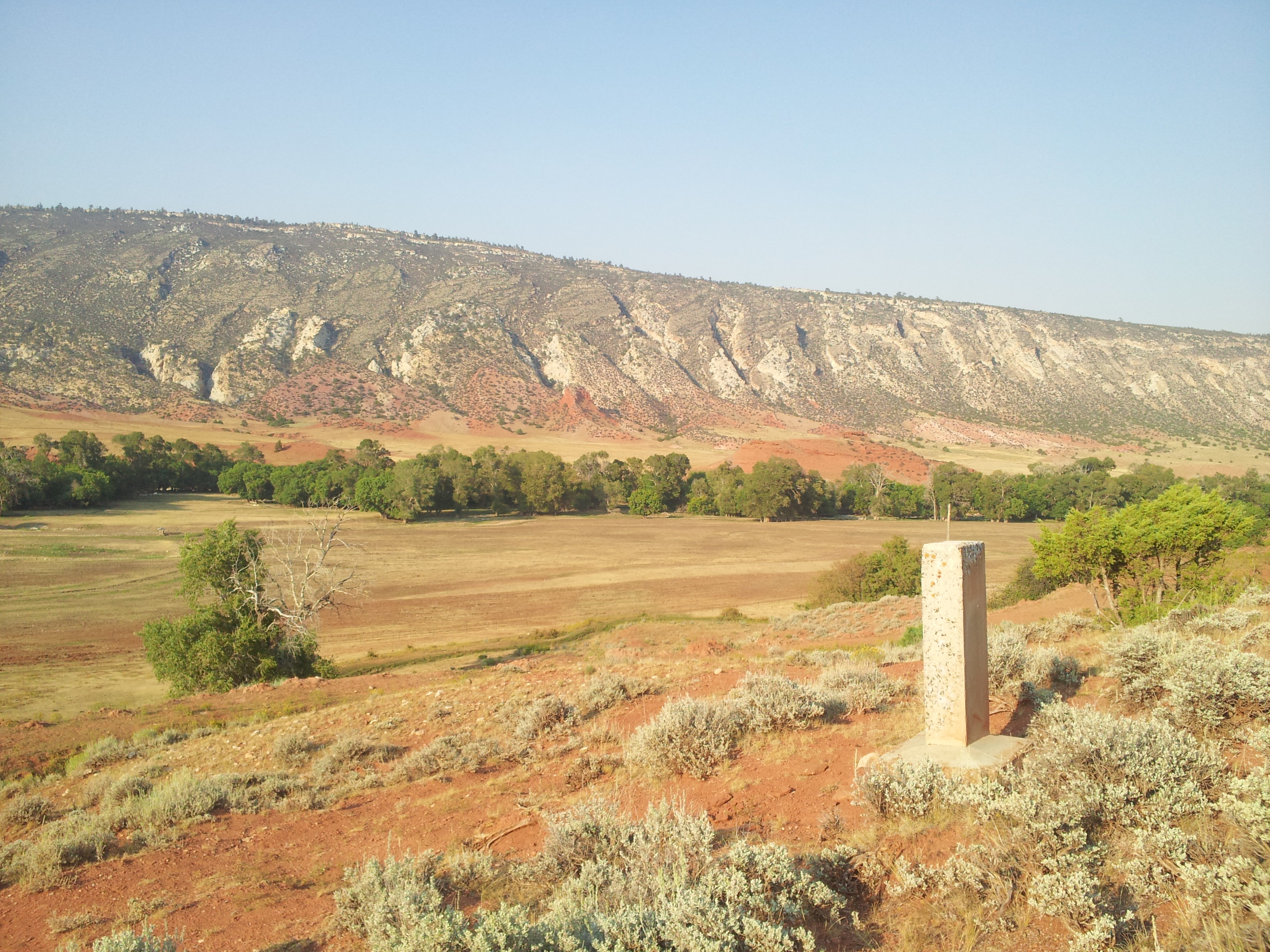

- Location within Wyoming Location within the United States
- Nearest city: Kaycee, Wyoming
- Coordinates: 43°45′36″N 106°56′55″W
- Built: 1876
- NRHP reference No.: 79002609
- Added to NRHP: August 15, 1979

The Dull Knife Battlefield is located on the eastern slope of the Bighorn Mountains in Johnson County, Wyoming near Kaycee. It was the scene of the Dull Knife Fight on November 25, 1876, in which the Fourth Cavalry under General Ranald S. Mackenzie raided the winter encampment of the NorthernCheyenne, destroying most of their material culture and all their winter supplies and thus forcing the Northern Cheyenne to seek shelter with the village of Crazy Horse in order to survive the winter. Five hundred ponies were captured and about 173 lodges destroyed. The Dull Knife battlefield is on private land and is available to visit only by special arrangement. The fight took place on November 25, 1876.

The battlefield site was considered by the Cheyenne to be sufficiently remote to be safe as winter quarters. The location is now the site of a ranch. The site was placed on the National Register of Historic Places in 1979.

== Photo gallery ==
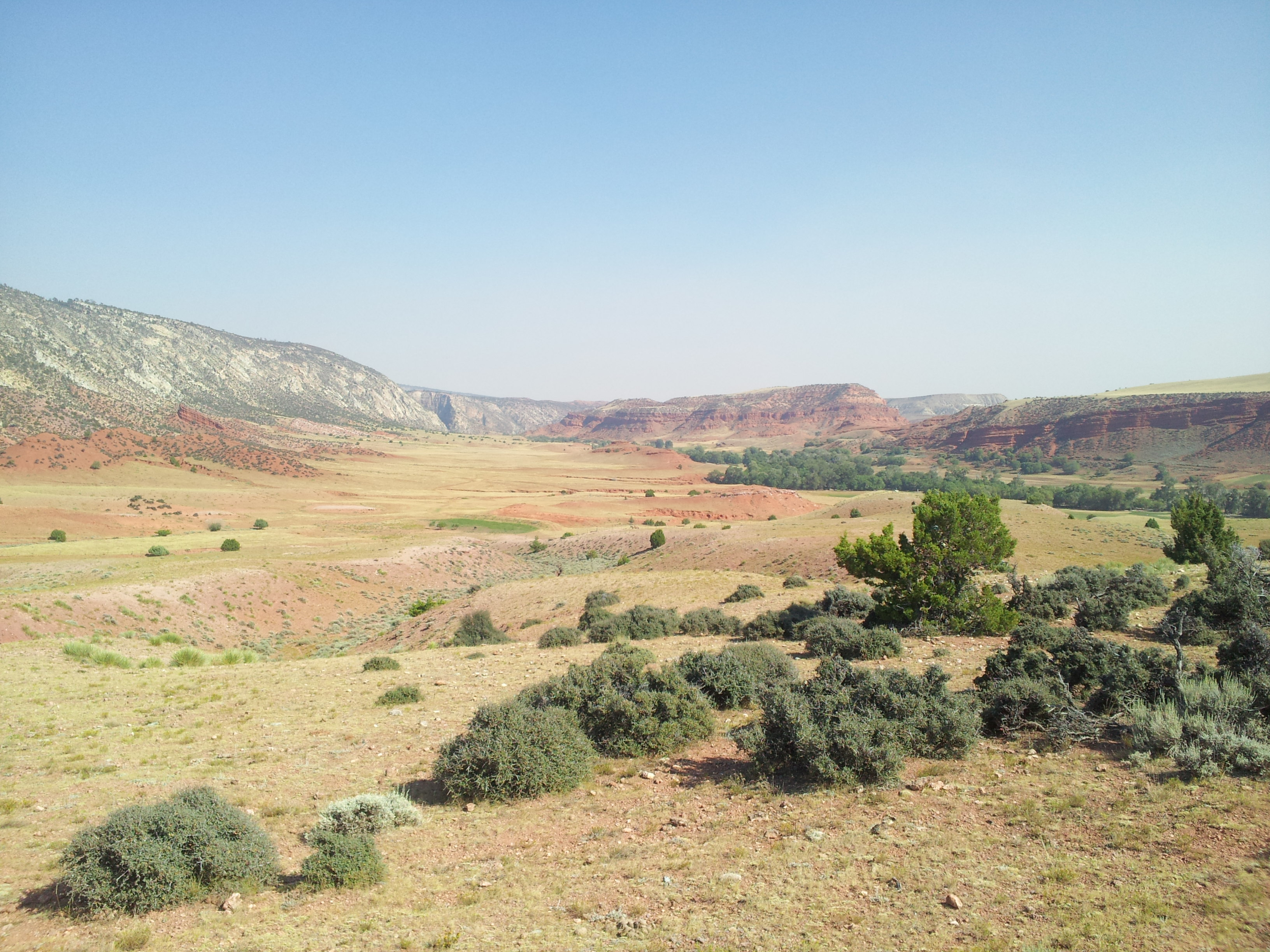
Dull Knife Battlefield looking east from Big Red Draw

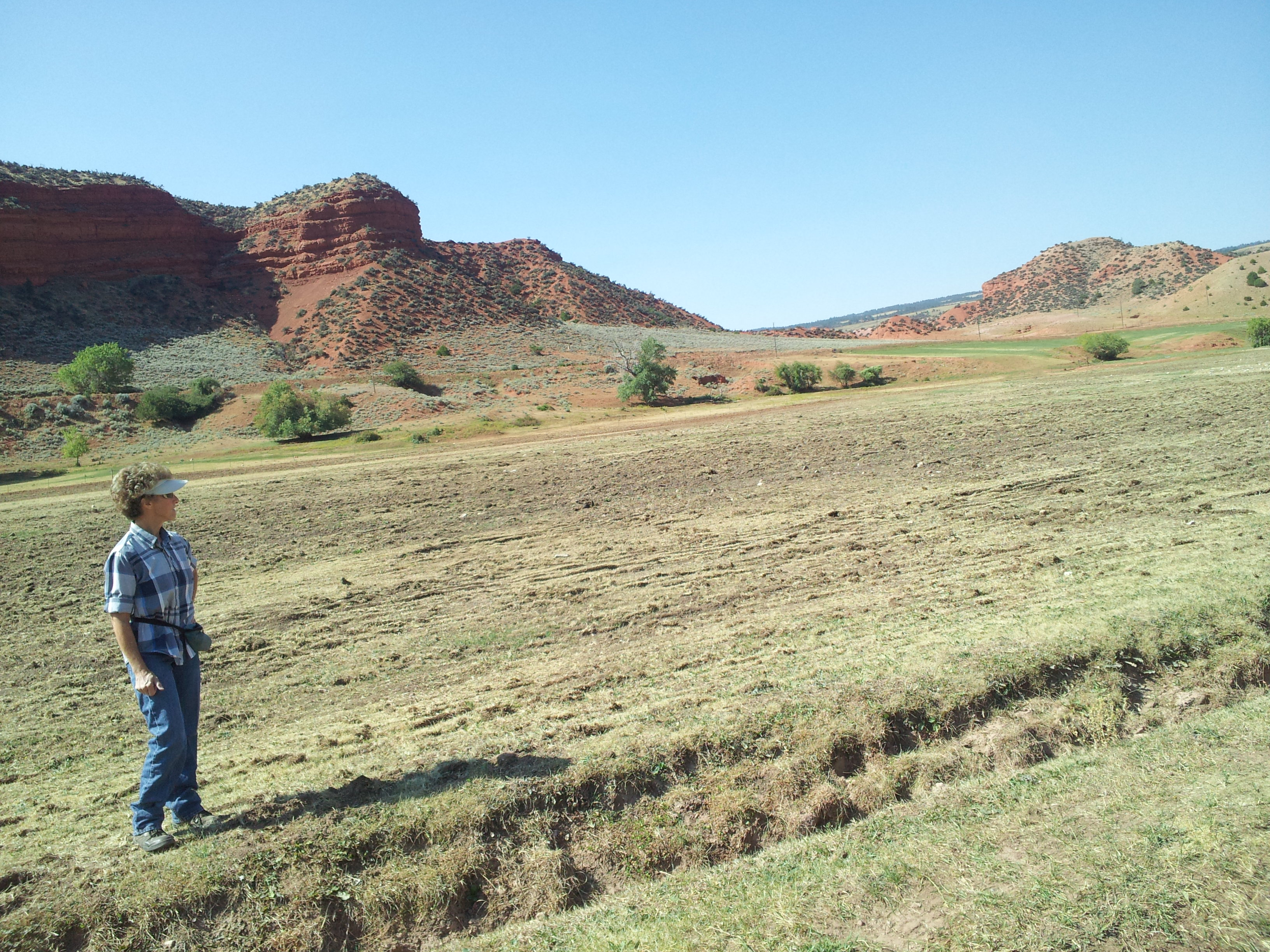
Site of Dull Knife Village looking south from creek

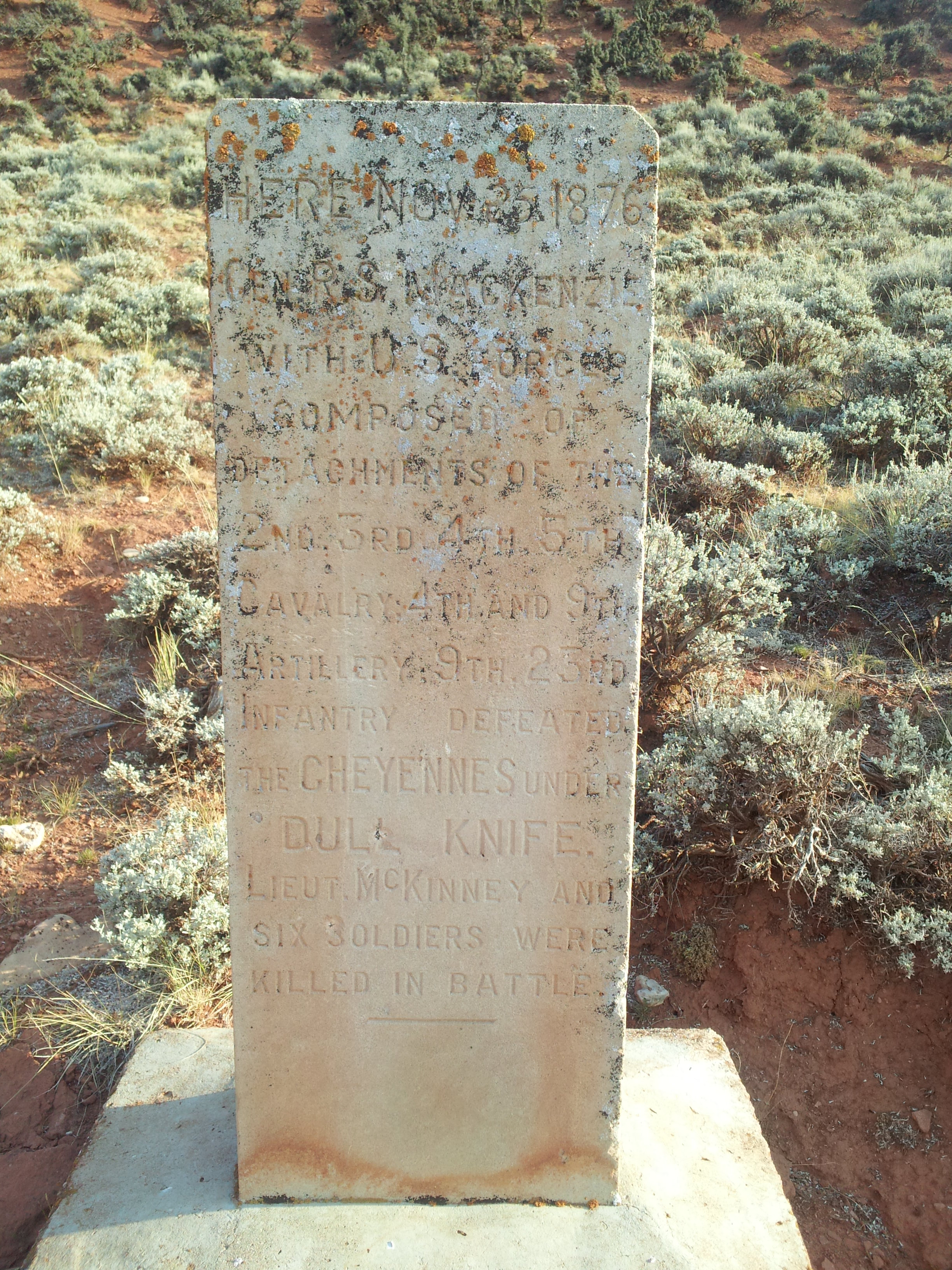
Battlefield marker above Dull Knife Village

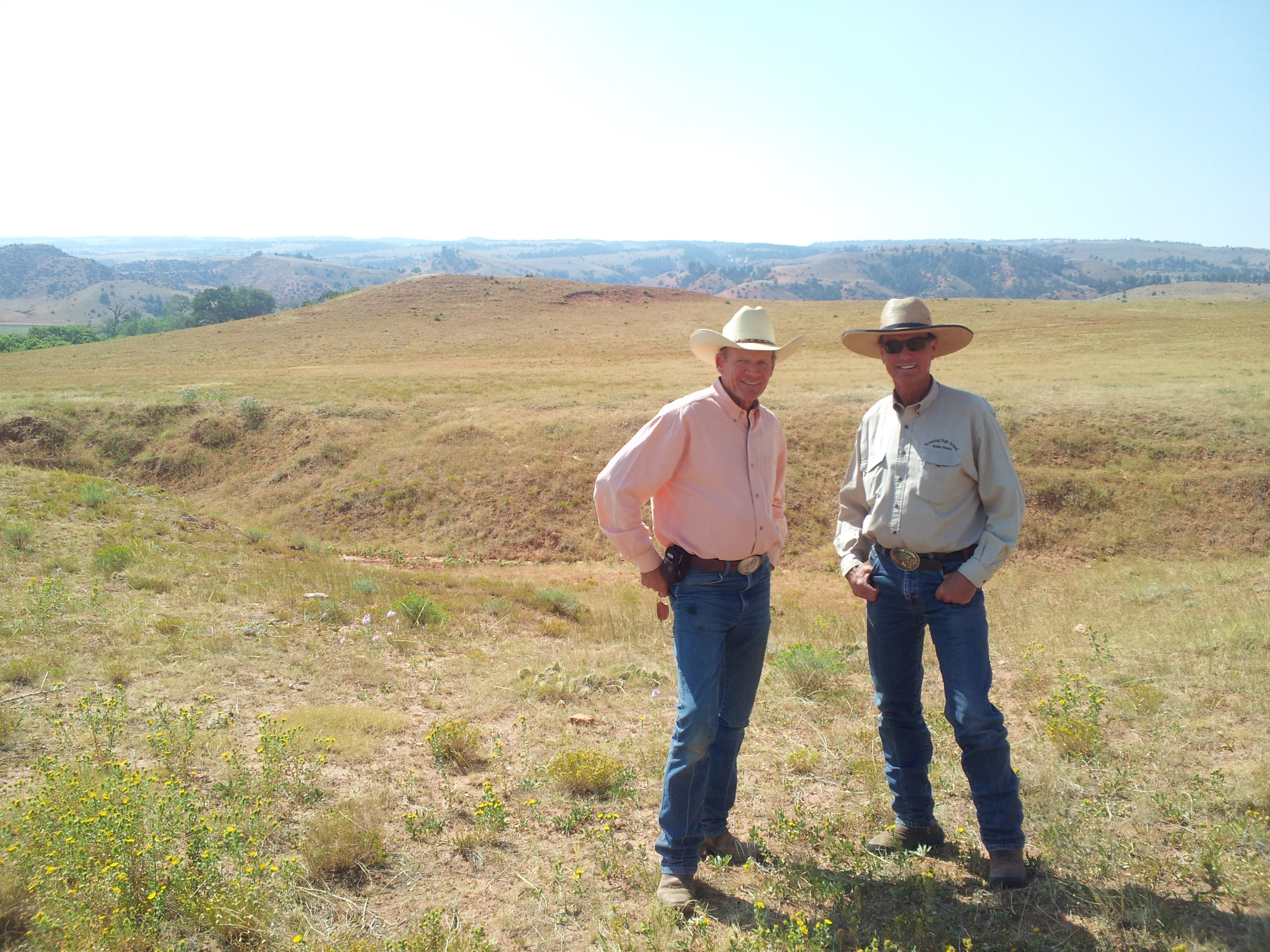
Ambush Draw where Lieutenant McKinney was shot

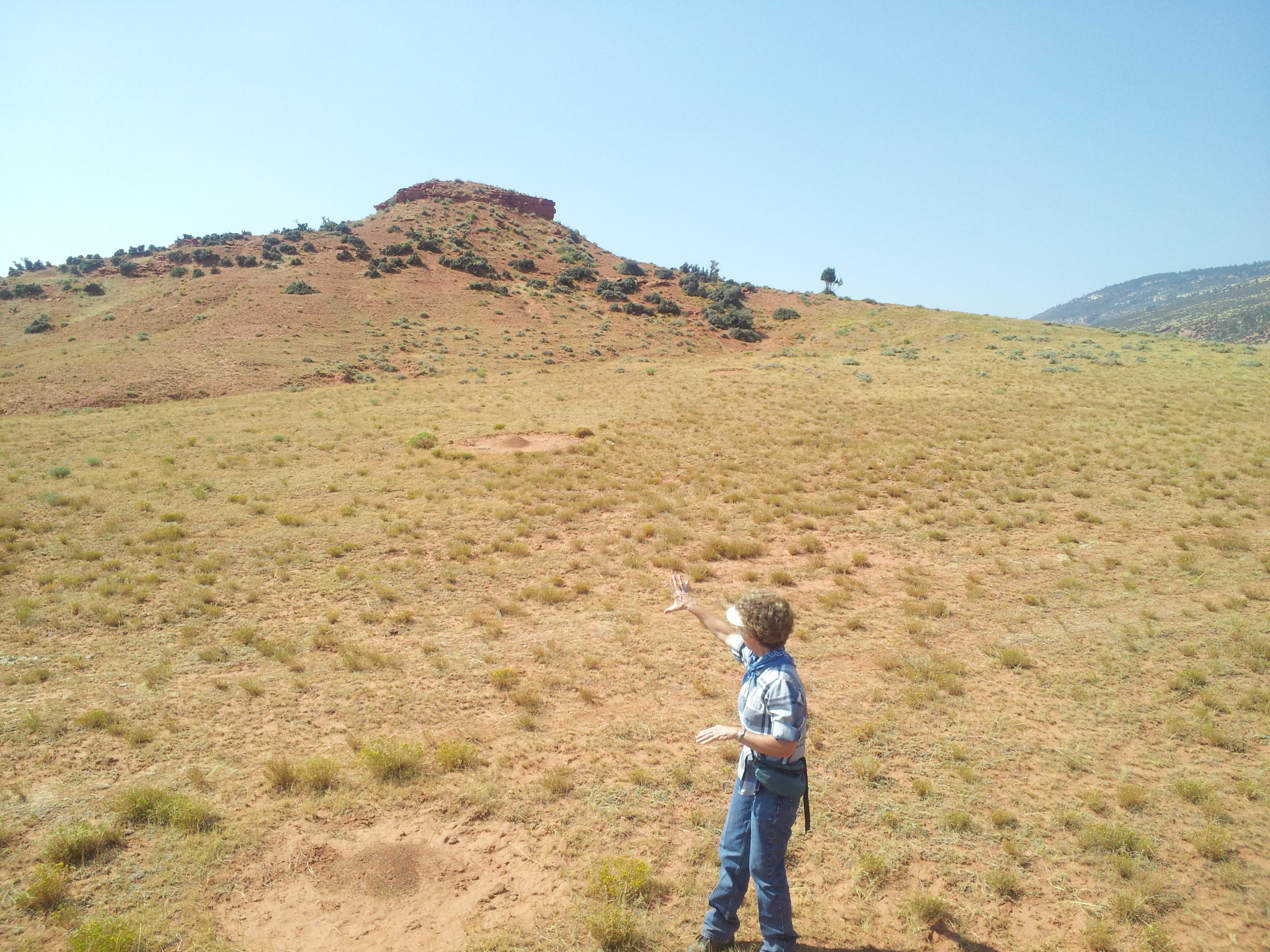
Hospital Hill where Lieutenant McKinney died

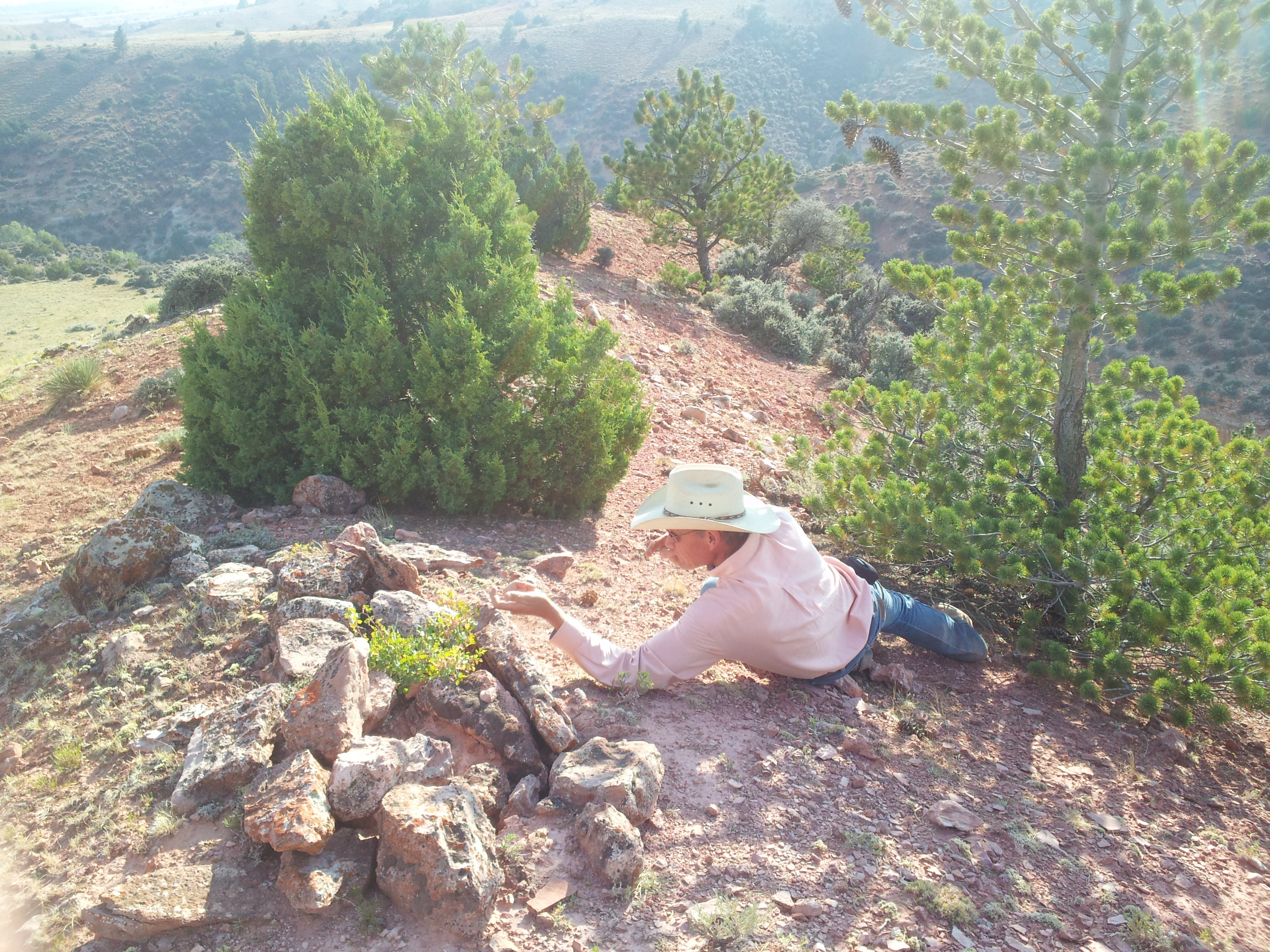
Breastworks built by Northern Cheyenne defenders above Big Red Draw
