= Wyoming Highway 340 =

State highway in Wyoming, United States

Wyoming Highway 340
- WYO 340 highlighted in red

Route information
- Maintained by WYDOT
- Length: 1.35 mi (2.17 km)

Major junctions
- West end: CR 2 west of Story
- East end: WYO 194 in Story

Location
- Country: United States
- State: Wyoming
- Counties: Sheridan

Highway system
- Wyoming State Highway System; Interstate; US; State
← WYO 339	→ WYO 341

Wyoming Highway 340 (WYO 340) is a 1.35-mile-long (2.17 km) east-west State Road in the U.S. state of Wyoming that runs through the community of Story in southern Sheridan County.

== Route description ==
Wyoming Highway 340 travels from Sheridan County Route 2 just west of Story east into the community as North Piney Creek Road. It changes into Crooked Street as it turns southeast in Story and reaches its eastern end at Wyoming Highway 194.

== Major intersections ==
The entire route is in Story, Sheridan County.

mi	km	Destinations	Notes
0.00	0.00	CR 2	Western terminus of WYO 340
1.35	2.17	WYO 194	Eastern terminus of WYO 340
1.000 mi = 1.609 km; 1.000 km = 0.621 mi
