= Wyoming Highway 341 =

State highway in Wyoming, United States

Wyoming Highway 341
- Arvada Spur
- WYO 341 highlighted in red

Route information
- Maintained by WYDOT
- Length: 3.19 mi (5.13 km)

Major junctions
- South end: CR 38 / CR 273 in Arvada
- North end: US 14 / US 16 north of Arvada

Location
- Country: United States
- State: Wyoming
- Counties: Sheridan

Highway system
- Wyoming State Highway System; Interstate; US; State
← WYO 340	→ WYO 342

Wyoming Highway 341 (WYO 341) is a 3.19-mile-long (5.13 km) Wyoming State Road located in eastern Sheridan County and is a spur from US 14/US 16 to the community of Arvada.

== Route description ==
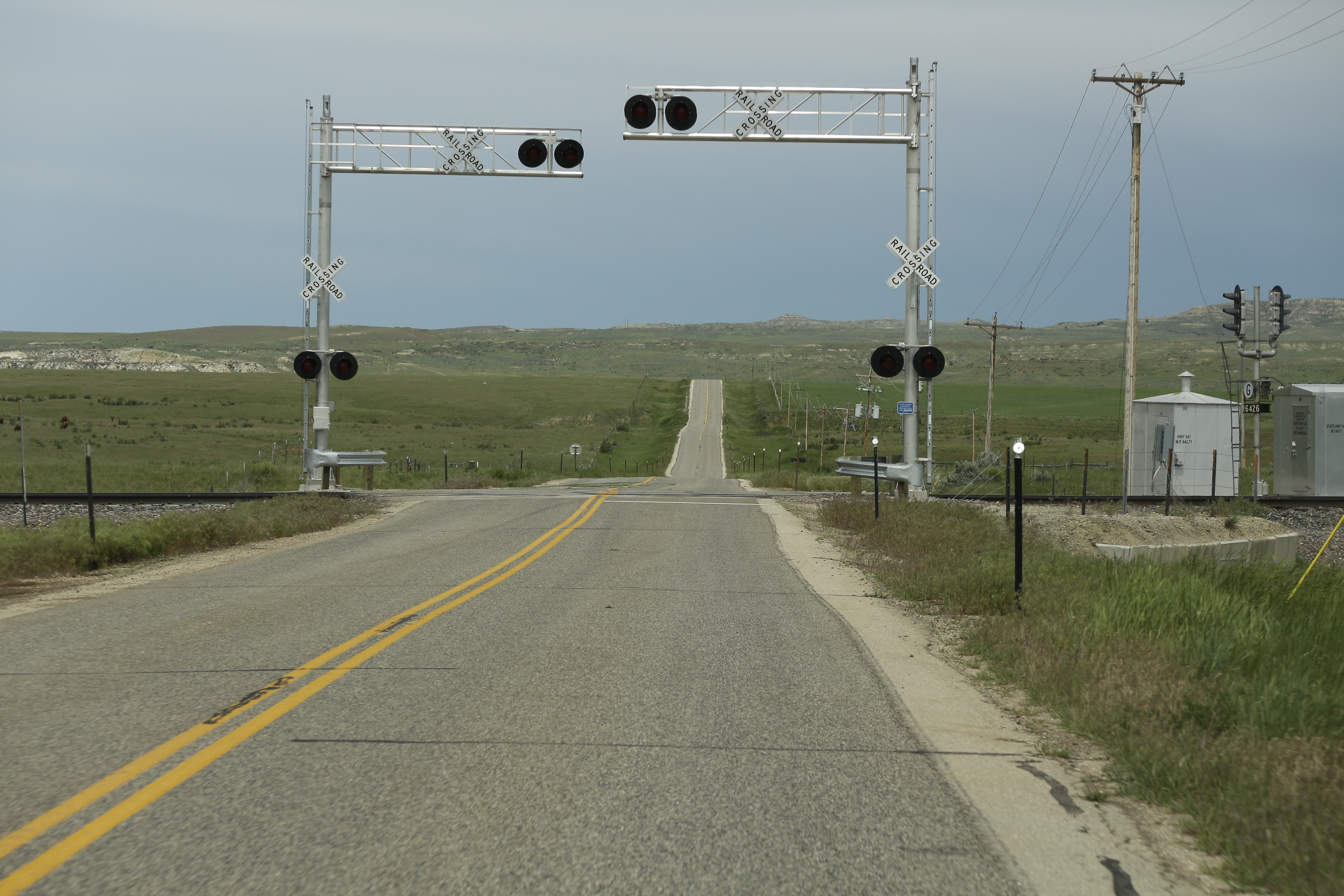
Wyoming Highway 341 near a railroad crossing.

Wyoming Highway 341 starts its southern end in the community of Arvada near Sheridan County Route 38 (Wild Horse Road) and Sheridan County Route 273 (Upper Powder River Road). WYO 341 actually begins just short of the Arvada city limits. Highway 341 travels north, perpendicular to the Burlington Northern & Santa Fe Railroad before crossing it. WYO 341 ends at just under 3.2 miles at US 14/US 16 three miles north of Arvada.

== Major intersections ==
The entire route is in Sheridan County.

Location	mi	km	Destinations	Notes
Arvada	0.00	0.00	CR 38 / CR 273	
	3.19	5.13	US 14 / US 16	
1.000 mi = 1.609 km; 1.000 km = 0.621 mi
