= Wyoming Highway 193 =

State highway in Wyoming, United States

Wyoming Highway 193
- WYO 193 highlighted in red

Route information
- Maintained by WYDOT
- Length: 6.19 mi (9.96 km)

Major junctions
- South end: US 87 / WYO 346 near Fort Phil Kearny
- WYO 194 in Story
- North end: US 87 / WYO 344 in Banner

Location
- Country: United States
- State: Wyoming
- Counties: Johnson, Sheridan

Highway system
- Wyoming State Highway System; Interstate; US; State
← WYO 192	→ WYO 194

Wyoming Highway 193 (WYO 193) is a 6.19-mile-long (9.96 km) north–south Wyoming State Road that runs through southern Sheridan County and the extreme northern part of Johnson County and serves the community of Story.

== Route description ==
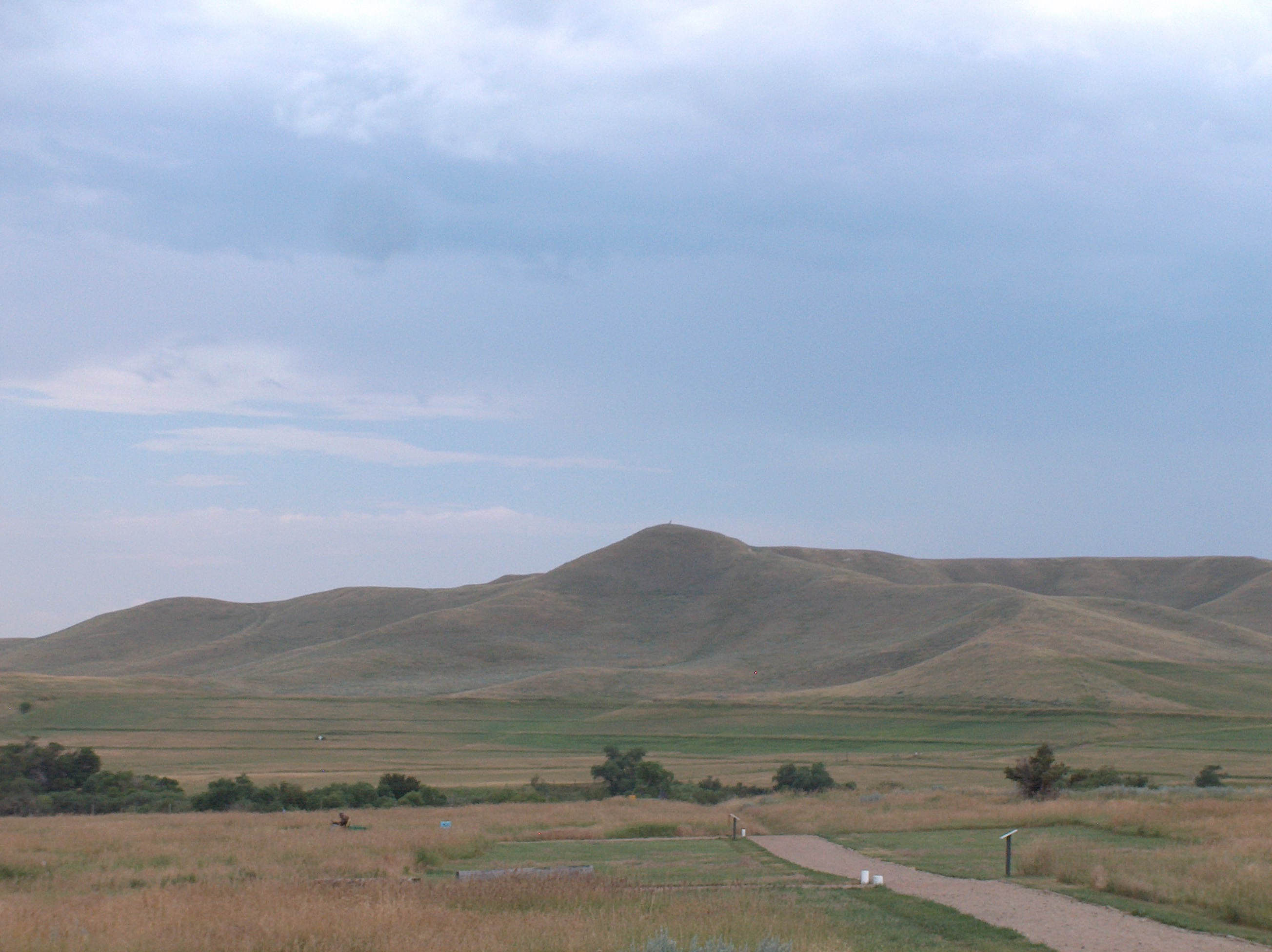
Nearby Pilot Hill from Fort Phil Kearny

Wyoming Highway 193 begins its southern end at U.S. Route 87 and Wyoming Highway 346 near the Fort Phil Kearny Historic Site and northwest of Interstate 90 (Exit 44). WYO 346 is the designation for the old southern section of US 87 that has been closed due to landslides. Because of the landslides, US 87 Temporary overlaps WYO 193 in its entirety. Highway 193 travels northwesterly towards the community of Story, reaching the community at just under 4 miles where it intersects the eastern terminus of Wyoming Highway 194. Leaving the eastern edge of Story, WYO 193 heads north to the unincorporated community of Banner where it reaches its northern terminus at U.S. Route 87 and its unsigned concurrent designation of Wyoming Highway 344.

== History ==
U.S. Highway 87 Temporary
- Location: Massacre Hill Historic Site

In the late 1990s, a short section of US 87/WYO 344 between Interstate 90 north of Buffalo and Sheridan, at the Massacre Hill Historic Site, had been permanently closed due to recurring landslides. According to the Wyoming Department of Transportation, the stretch of roadway has ongoing and costly maintenance problems, with the most recent landslides closing the roadway as of the Spring of 1998. Because repairing the roadway could potentially damage the historic site, WYDOT recommends that through traffic use either Interstate 90 or Wyoming 193 as an alternate route.

As a result of the landslide on US 87, Wyoming petitioned the American Association of State Highway and Transportation Officials (or AASHTO) to reroute US 87 over Highway 193 in the late 1990s. However, this was denied. Consequently, a detour for US 87 follows WYO 193 since it is unlikely that US 87 will be reconstructed at its current location.

== Major intersections ==
County	Location	mi	km	Destinations	Notes
Johnson		0.00	0.00	US 87 south / WYO 346	Temporary southern overlap US 87
Sheridan	Story	3.93	6.32	WYO 194	Eastern terminus of WYO 194
Sheridan		6.19	9.96	US 87 north / WYO 344	Temporary northern overlap US 87
1.000 mi = 1.609 km; 1.000 km = 0.621 mi

== See also ==
- List of state highways in Wyoming
