= Wyoming Highway 194 =

State highway in Wyoming, United States

Wyoming Highway 194
- Fish Hatchery Road
- WYO 194 highlighted in red

Route information
- Maintained by WYDOT
- Length: 2.81 mi (4.52 km)

Major junctions
- West end: Story Fish Hatchery west of Story
- East end: WYO 193 in Story

Location
- Country: United States
- State: Wyoming
- Counties: Sheridan

Highway system
- Wyoming State Highway System; Interstate; US; State
← WYO 193	→ WYO 196

Wyoming Highway 194 (WYO 194) is a 2.81-mile-long (4.52 km) east–west State Road in the U.S. state of Wyoming that runs through the community of Story in southern Sheridan County.

== Route description ==
Wyoming Highway 194 travels from an area called Grandma's Mountain and the state fish hatchery west of Story. It travels east into Story, a census-designated place (CDP), intersecting the western terminus of Wyoming Highway 340 (Crooked Street), before turning north at the eastern edge of the community and again east to end at Wyoming Highway 193.

Wyoming Highway 194 lies entirely in Sheridan County, so it is an exception to the numbering rule. The Sheridan County numbering scheme indicates this route should be numbered between 330 and 349.

== Major intersections ==
The entire route is in Story, Sheridan County.

mi	km	Destinations	Notes
0.00	0.00	Story Fish Hatchery	
1.83	2.95	WYO 340	Eastern terminus of WYO 340
2.81	4.52	WYO 193	
1.000 mi = 1.609 km; 1.000 km = 0.621 mi
