= Banner, Wyoming =

- Unincorporated community
- Nickname: Big Banner
- Motto: natus e terra
- Location within the state of Wyoming Banner, Wyoming (the United States)
- Coordinates: 44°36′5″N 106°51′55″W
- Country: United States
- State: Wyoming
- County: Sheridan
- Elevation: 4,580 ft (1,400 m)

Population (2020)
  - Total: between 0 and 3,078
- Time zone: UTC-7 (Mountain (MST))
  - Summer (DST): UTC-6 (MDT)
- ZIP codes: 82832
- GNIS feature ID: 1597211
- Website: https://www.sheridancountywy.gov/

Banner is an unincorporated community in southern Sheridan County, Wyoming, United States. It lies near Interstate 90, south of the city of Sheridan, the county seat of Sheridan County. Its elevation is 4,580 feet (1,400 m). Although Banner is unincorporated, it had a post office, with the ZIP code of 82832, which closed in 2004. Public education in the community of Banner is provided by Sheridan County School District #2.

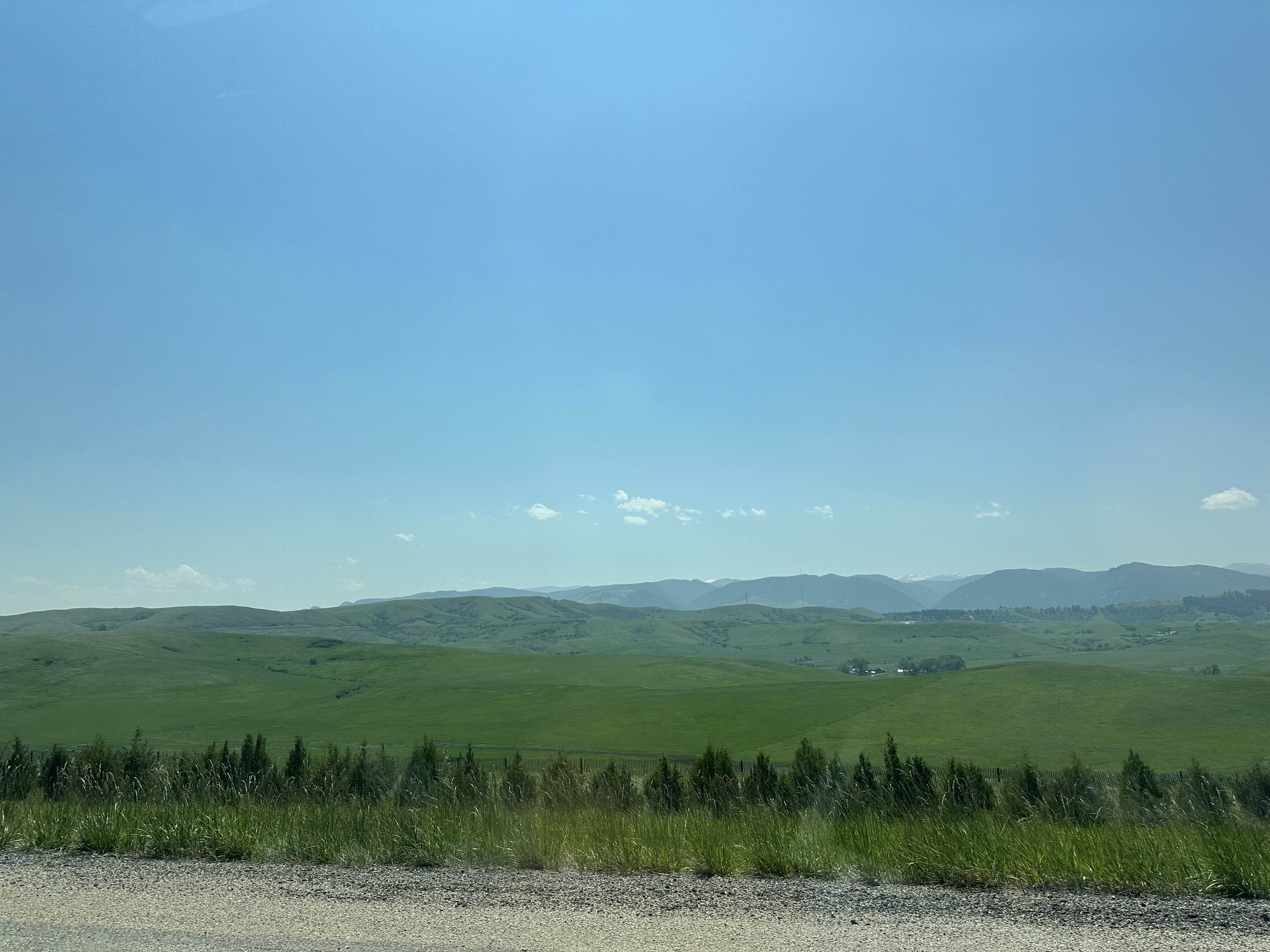
A field in Banner, Wyoming

Story lies three miles to the southwest, and the Bighorn Mountains (and Bighorn National Forest) are to Banner's west. The town is accessible via U.S. Route 87 (cosigned with Wyoming Highway 193).

== History ==
The Bozeman Trail passed by town in the mid-1860s. Two important battles of the war between the United States and the Plains Indians happened nearby. The 1866 Fetterman Fight was a victory of the Lakota, Cheyenne, and Arapaho Indians over soldiers of the United States army, and the 1867 Wagon Box Fight involved Lakota Sioux and soldiers from nearby Fort Phil Kearny.

There was an oil spill of the Conoco Seminoe Pipeline near Banner on June 27, 1997, which led to the death of several cattle.
