= Saddlestring, Wyoming =

Unincorporated community in Wyoming, US

- Unincorporated community
- Location within Wyoming Location within the United States
- Coordinates: 44°27′18″N 106°53′50″W
- Country: United States
- State: Wyoming
- County: Johnson
- Elevation: 5,440 ft (1,660 m)
- Time zone: UTC−7 (Mountain (MST))
  - Summer (DST): UTC−6 (MDT)
- ZIP Code: 82840
- GNIS feature ID: 1604592

Saddlestring is an unincorporated community in northwestern Johnson County, Wyoming, United States, on the eastern edge of the Bighorn National Forest. It lies along local roads northwest of the city of Buffalo, the county seat of Johnson County. Saddlestring possessed its own post office from 1946 to 1965, and from 1967 to 1999; although the post office is now closed, Saddlestring retains its old ZIP Code of 82840. The post office building still exists; located on the HF Bar Ranch, it is a contributing property to a historic district located on the ranch. The oldest building in Saddlestring is the log barn, which is attached to the Rock Creek Rod and Gun Club.

Public education in the community of Saddlestring is provided by Johnson County School District #1.
