= Sheridan County School District Number 2 =

School district in Wyoming, United States

Sheridan County School District #2 is a public school district based in Sheridan, Wyoming, United States.

== Geography ==
Sheridan County School District #2 serves the central portion of Sheridan County, including the following communities:

- Incorporated places
  - City of Sheridan
- Census-designated places (Note: All census-designated places are unincorporated.)
  - Story (most)
- Unincorporated places
  - Banner
  - Wolf
  - Wyarno

== Schools ==
=== High school ===
- Grades 9-12
  - Sheridan High School

=== Junior high school ===
- Grades 6-8
  - Sheridan Junior High School

=== Elementary schools ===
- Grades K-5
  - Coffeen Elementary School
  - Highland Park Elementary School
  - Meadowlark Elementary School
  - Sagebrush Elementary School
  - Story Elementary School
  - Woodland Park Elementary School

=== Alternative schools ===
- Grades 9-12
- Fort Mackenzie High School
- Grades 6-8
  - The Wright Place

== Student demographics ==
The following figures are as of October 1, 2008.

- Total District Enrollment: 3,121
- Student enrollment by gender
  - Male: 1,592 (51.01%)
  - Female: 1,529 (48.99%)
- Student enrollment by ethnicity
  - White (not Hispanic): 2,846 (91.19%)
  - Hispanic: 151 (4.84%)
  - American Indian or Alaskan Native: 60 (1.92%)
  - Asian or Pacific Islander: 41 (1.31%)
  - Black (not Hispanic): 23 (0.74%)

== See also ==
- List of school districts in Wyoming
