= Kaycee School =

School in Kaycee, Wyoming, United States

Coordinates: 43°42′46″N 106°38′02″W

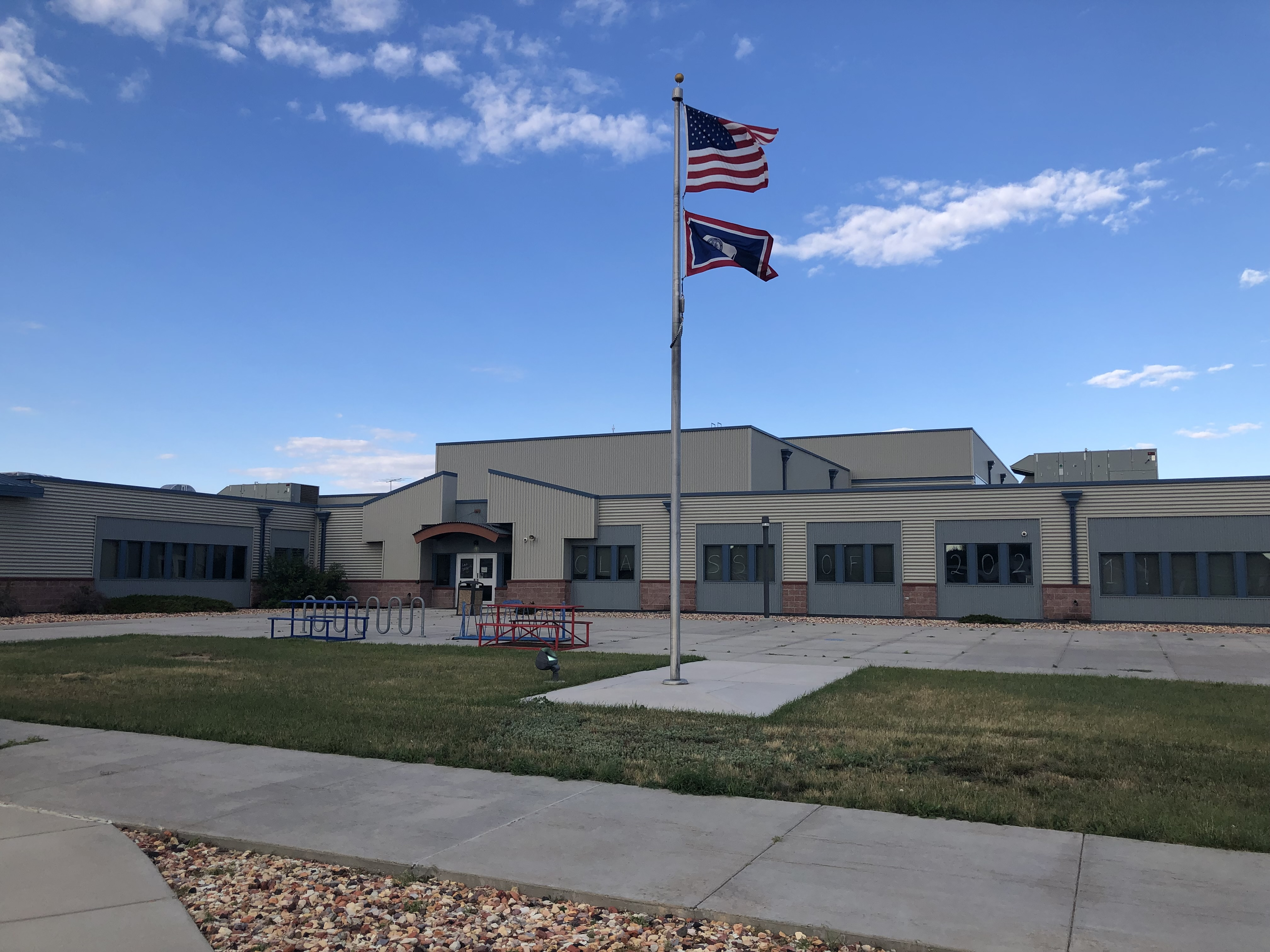

Information
- School district: Johnson County School District Number 1
- Grades: K-12
- Enrollment: c.160
- Website: www.jcsd1.us/o/kaycee/

Kaycee School is a small rural K–12 public school in Johnson County School District #1 in Kaycee, Wyoming. Enrollment is approximately 160 students.
