= Hole-in-the-Wall (Wyoming) =

Mountain pass in Johnson County, Wyoming, United States of America

Coordinates: 43°36′31″N 106°53′20″W

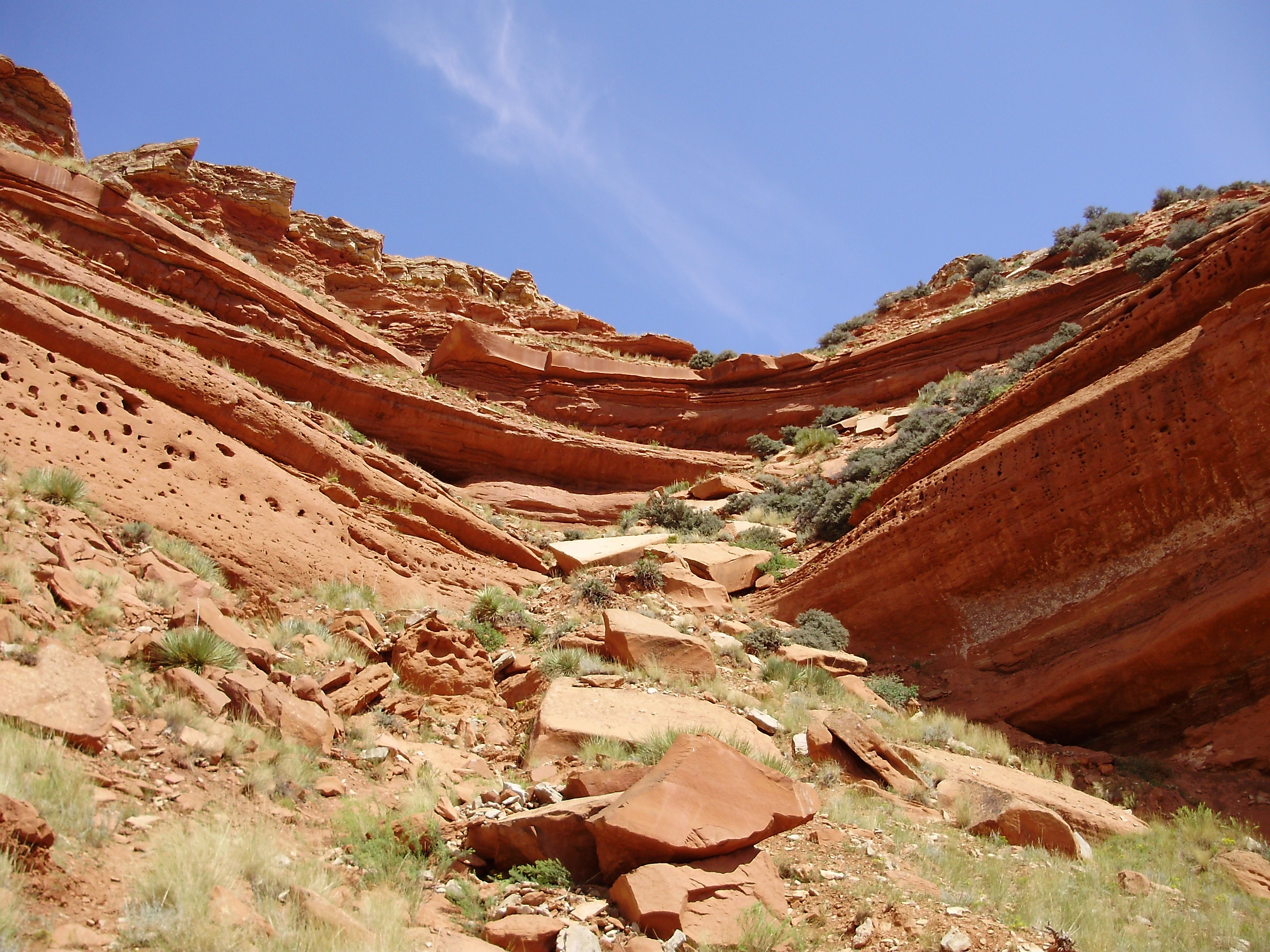
The Hole in the Wall is actually a pass over the red wall. This is the approach from the west.

Hole-in-the-Wall is a remote pass in the Big Horn Mountains of Johnson County, Wyoming. In the late 19th and the early 20th centuries, the Hole-in-the-Wall Gang and Butch Cassidy's Wild Bunch gang met at the log cabin, which is now preserved at the Old Trail Town museum in Cody, Wyoming.

== History ==
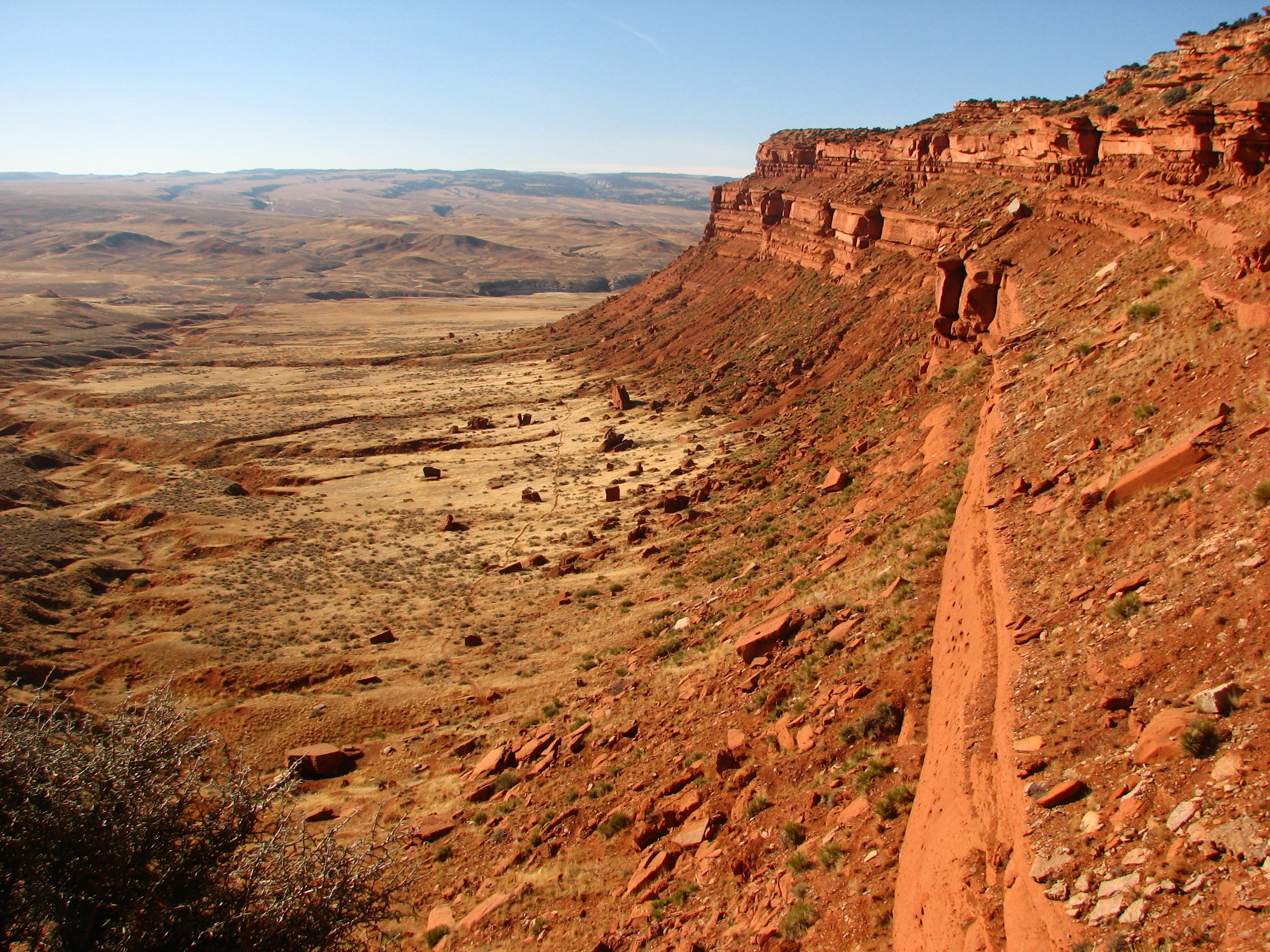
A red sandstone escarpment dominates the area.

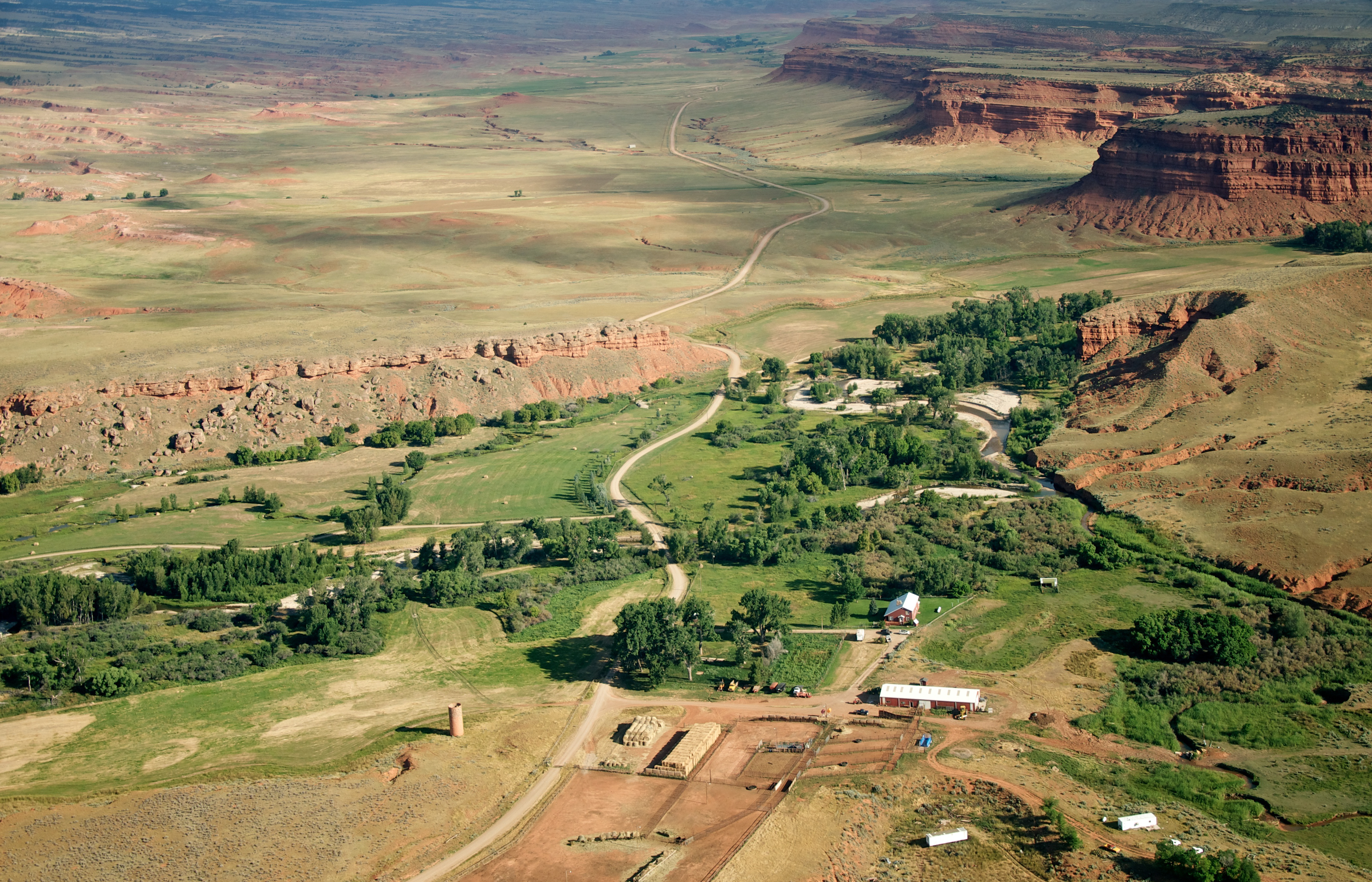
Near Hole-in-the-Wall, Wyoming

Hole-in-the-Wall is located in the Big Horn Mountains of Johnson County in northern Wyoming. The site was used in the late 19th century by the Hole-in-the-Wall Gang, a group of cattle rustlers and other outlaws that included the Logan brothers, Black Jack Ketchum, and Butch Cassidy's Wild Bunch. Cassidy, the Sundance Kid, and other desperados met at a log cabin in the Hole-in-the-Wall country, which has been preserved at the Old Trail Town museum in Cody, Wyoming. The cabin was built in 1883 by Alexander Ghent.

Pinkerton detective Charlie Siringo wrote "I started for the Big Horn Basin in the vicinity of the Hole-in-the-Wall in northern Wyoming. I had received instructions from Asst. Supt. Curran to go up there and get in with the friends of the 'Wild Bunch', and learn their secrets."

The area was remote and secluded, easily defended because of its narrow passes, and impossible for lawmen to approach without alerting the outlaws. From the late 1860s to around 1910, the pass was used frequently by numerous outlaw gangs. Eventually, it faded into history, with gangs using it less frequently. At its height, it featured several cabins that gangs used to lie up during the harsh Wyoming winters, and it had a livery stable, a corral, livestock, and supplies, with each gang contributing to the upkeep of the site.

Robert Redford described the Hole-in-the-Wall as "an outlaw stronghold that deserves its name from a niche in the Great Red Wall of cliffs extending many miles to the south. It was here that the Wild Bunch established one of their three 'headquarters' in 1896, although the 'Wall' had been a favorite hiding place of outlaws many years before that. Hole-in-the-Wall was one of three main strongholds used not just by the Wild Bunch but other outlaws as well in those days. (Brown's Park and Robbers Roost, in Colorado and Utah, respectively, were the other two.)"
