= Kaycee, Wyoming =

- Town
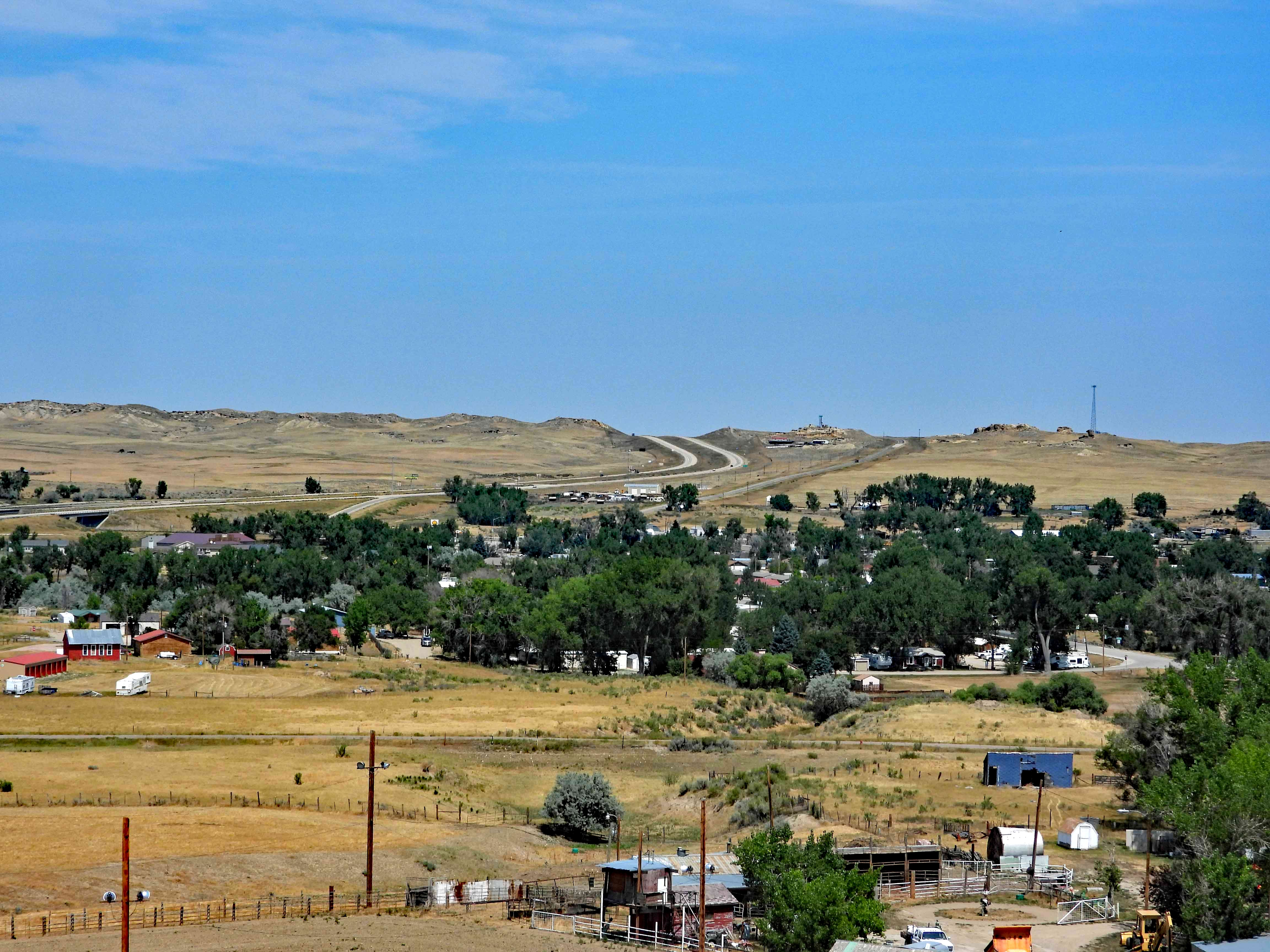
- Looking North over Kaycee with Interstate Highway 25 in the distance.

- Location of Kaycee in Johnson County, Wyoming.
- Coordinates: 43°42′36″N 106°38′14″W
- Country: United States
- State: Wyoming
- County: Johnson

Area
  - Total: 0.45 sq mi (1.16 km^{2})
  - Land: 0.44 sq mi (1.14 km^{2})
  - Water: 0.012 sq mi (0.03 km^{2})
- Elevation: 4,646 ft (1,416 m)

Population (2020)
  - Total: 247
  - Density: 561/sq mi (217/km^{2})
- Time zone: UTC-7 (Mountain (MST))
  - Summer (DST): UTC-6 (MDT)
- ZIP code: 82639
- Area code: 307
- FIPS code: 56-41353
- GNIS feature ID: 2412818
- Website: kayceewyoming.org

Kaycee is a town in Johnson County, Wyoming, United States. The population was 247 at the 2020 census. It is home to a museum that preserves the cattle ranching heritage of the area, especially the history of the Johnson County War.

Kaycee was incorporated in 1906 after the establishment of a small post office and general store. The town was named after the brand "KC" used by its earliest homesteader, John Nolan. The government required the name to be spelled out resulting in "Kaycee". The town is now home to three churches, two bars, two restaurants, one store, one museum, one K-12 school, and zero stoplights.

Western music star and rodeo champion Chris LeDoux resided on a ranch near Kaycee, although he was born in Biloxi, Mississippi.

Wyoming Governor Mark Gordon grew up on the Gordon Ranch near Kaycee. Gordon is owner of the Merlin Ranch east of Buffalo and is affiliated with the 48 Ranch Partnership in Kaycee.

== Geography ==
According to the United States Census Bureau, the town has a total area of 0.41 square miles (1.06 km^{2}), of which 0.40 square miles (1.04 km^{2}) is land and 0.01 square miles (0.03 km^{2}) is water.

== History ==
=== The Portuguese Fort ===
In 1834 a band of trappers and traders led by Antonio Montero from Portugal built a trading post east of Kaycee WY.It became known as the "Portuguese Fort." A unique site, what little remains from the area have been donated to the Hoofprints of the Past Museum and includes artefacts including a sword, beads, and clay pipes.

=== The Bozeman Trail ===
The 1860s brought new attention from both whites and Native Americans to the northeast corner of what soon would become Wyoming Territory. First, a gold frenzy in Montana Territory drew miners north from the emigrant road that followed the North Platte River. Mountain man Jim Bridger warned against establishing a trail through the Arapaho and Lakota hunting grounds, urging that another path west of the Bighorns be used instead. But the Powder River Basin route was the most direct and, in 1863, John Bozeman following ancient routes long used by Indians, blazed the Bozeman Trail through the middle of the basin.

The Bozeman Trail ran within four miles of Kaycee, overlaying previous Indian, trader and exploration routes and connecting the Oregon Trail to the gold rush territory in Montana. Its most important period was 1863–1868, and its most significant consequence was the Indian Wars of the Northern Plains. The Hoofprints of the Past Museum displays items relating to this period.

=== Fort Reno and Cantonment Reno ===
During the Indian Wars of the late 1800s, two military posts were built miles apart near the Bozeman Trail crossing of the Powder River: Fort Reno in the 1860s and Cantonment Reno in the 1870s. Historical markers presently mark the spots.

Items donated from the Fort Reno site are on display at the Hoofprints of the Past Museum, as well as a diorama of the fort created by Robert Wilson, an expert in local military forts.

=== Moreton Frewen ===
The Frewen Ranch was located east of present-day Kaycee at the confluence of the North Fork and the Middle Fork of the Powder River. Moreton Frewen was the fifth son of Thomas Frewen, MP for South Leicestershire, and was educated at Trinity College, Cambridge, where he gained his BA in 1877. He emigrated to Wyoming during the cattle boom in the 1870s and 1880s. A charming if financially incompetent adventurer from an English landed gentry family known for reckless financial and political schemes, he managed to marry Clarita "Clara" Jerome (1851–1935) in 1881, daughter of the New York City financier Leonard Jerome, and sister to Lord Randolph Churchill's wife Jennie. They settled together on a huge Wyoming ranch, The Prince of Wales Ranch, where Frewen built an enormous log lodge/castle later destroyed by fire and ran up ever increasing debt, earning the sobriquets "Mortal Ruin" and "the splendid pauper". His laterally descended family, the Martins formerly of Charley Hall, Leicestershire, refer to him to this day however not as "Mortal Ruin" but as "Immortal Ruin", as he ran through two family fortunes before being granted a remittance and "encouraged" by family to emigrate to America.

=== Hole In the Wall ===
Hole-in-the-Wall is located in the foothills of the Big Horn Mountains of Johnson County, Wyoming. The site was used in the late 19th century by the Hole in the Wall Gang, a group of cattle rustlers and other outlaws which included Kid Curry, Black Jack Ketchum, and Butch Cassidy's Wild Bunch gang. Cassidy, the Sundance Kid, and other desperados met at a log cabin in the Hole-in-the-Wall country which has been preserved at the Old Trail Town museum in Cody, Wyoming. The cabin was built in 1883 by Alexander Ghent.

=== The Johnson County Cattle War ===
In the early days in Wyoming, most of the land was in the public domain, open both to stockraising as open range and to homesteading. Large numbers of cattle were turned loose on the open range by large ranches, sometimes financed by other investors. In the spring a roundup was held and the cows and the calves belonging to each ranch were separated and the calves branded. Before the roundup, sometimes calves, especially orphan or stray calves, were surreptitiously branded, and thus taken. The large ranches, concerned about this practice, forbade their employees from owning cattle and aggressively defended against rustling.

The situation became steadily worse after the poor winter of 1886. The large companies began to aggressively appropriate land and control the flow and supply of water in this area; they justified these excesses on what was public land by using the catch-all allegation of rustling, and vigorously sought to exclude the smaller ranchers from participation in the annual roundup; apparently agents of the larger ranches killed several alleged rustlers. A number of lynchings of alleged rustlers took place in 1889, including the double lynching of innocent homesteaders and ranchers Ella Watson and Jim Averell.

The large ranches were organized as the Wyoming Stock Growers Association (the WSGA) and gathered socially as the Cheyenne Club in Cheyenne, Wyoming. In April 1892 the WSGA hired killers from Texas; an expedition of 50 men was organized, which proceeded by train from Cheyenne to Casper, Wyoming, then toward Johnson County, intending to eliminate alleged rustlers and also, apparently, to replace the government in Johnson County. Major Frank Wolcott led the Regulators into Johnson County. To prevent an alarm, the telegraph lines out of Buffalo were cut. The expedition was accompanied by two newspaper reporters whose lurid accounts later appeared in the eastern newspapers.

==== Nathan D. Champion ====
The first target of the WSGA was Nate Champion at the "KC Ranch". Champion was a small rancher who was active in the efforts of small ranchers to organize a competing roundup. Three men besides Champion were at the KC. Two men, evidently trappers, who had taken shelter for the night, were captured as they emerged from the cabin early that morning to collect water at the nearby Powder River, while the third, Nick Ray, was shot while standing inside the doorway of the cabin and died a few hours later. The fourth, Nate Champion, was besieged. Two passers-by noticed the ruckus and rode to Buffalo, where Johnson County Sheriff William "Red" Angus raised a posse of 200 men and set out for the "KC Ranch".

Champion held out for several hours, killing at least four of the vigilantes, and wounding several others. During the siege, Champion kept a poignant journal which contained a number of notes he wrote to friends while taking cover inside the cabin. "Boys, I feel pretty lonesome just now. I wish there was someone here with me so we could watch all sides at once." he wrote. The last journal entry read: Well, they have just got through shelling the house like hail. I heard them splitting wood. I guess they are going to fire the house tonight. I think I will make a break when night comes, if alive. Shooting again. It's not night yet. The house is all fired. Goodbye, boys, if I never see you again.

With the house on fire, Nate Champion signed his journal entry and put the journal in his pocket before he emerged, running from the back door with a Colt Revolver in the left hand and a Winchester rifle in the right. He was gunned down by four men firing simultaneously, hit by 28 bullets. The invaders later pinned a note on Champion's bullet-riddled chest that read "Cattle Thieves Beware". They also carefully removed entries from the diary which named some of the attackers.

==== Jack Flagg ====
'The Invaders then loaded up the wood on a wagon that was left by Jack Flagg and pushed it towards the cabin. With the house on fire, Nate Champion signed his journal entry and put it in his pocket before running from the back door with a six shooter in one hand and either a knife and a rifle in the other. As he emerged, the Invaders shot him dead. The killers pinned a note on Champion's bullet-riddled chest that read, "Cattle Thieves Beware." Jack Flagg, who after escaping his pursuers, rode to Buffalo where he reported Champion's dilemma to the townsfolk. Sheriff Angus then raised a posse of 200 men over the next 24 hours and set out for the KC on Sunday night, April 10.

Artifacts from the Johnson County War, including the local KC Fight and Nate Champion related items are on display at the Hoofprints of the Past Museum.

== Demographics ==
Historical population
Census	Pop.	Note	%±
1920	217		—
1930	161		−25.8%
1940	210		30.4%
1950	211		0.5%
1960	284		34.6%
1970	272		−4.2%
1980	271		−0.4%
1990	256		−5.5%
2000	249		−2.7%
2010	263		5.6%
2020	247		−6.1%
U.S. Decennial Census

=== 2020 census ===
As of the census of 2020, there were 247 people, 107 households, and 82 families residing in the town. The population density was 617.5 inhabitants per square mile (238.4/km^{2}). There were 131 housing units at an average density of 327.5 per square mile (126.4/km^{2}). The racial makeup of the town was 92.3% White and 6.5% from two or more races. Hispanic or Latino of any race were 2.8% of the population.

There were 107 households, of which 24.3% had children under the age of 18 living with them, 58.9% were married couples living together, 17.8% had a female householder with no husband present, 0.0% had a male householder with no wife present, and 23.4% were non-families. 17.8% of all households were made up of individuals, and 10.3% had someone living alone who was 65 years of age or older. The average household size was 2.50 and the average family size was 2.91.

The median age in the town was 53.9 years. 22.5% of residents were under the age of 18; 4.1% were between the ages of 18 and 24; 14.2% were from 25 to 44; 25.8% were from 45 to 64; and 33.3% were 65 years of age or older. The gender makeup of the town was 50.6% male and 49.4% female.

The median income for a household in the town was $56,875, and the median income for a family was $56,250. About 7.1% of the population were below the poverty line, including 18.3% of those under the age of eighteen and 0.0% of those 65 or over.

=== 2010 census ===
As of the census of 2010, there were 263 people, 115 households, and 76 families residing in the town. The population density was 657.5 inhabitants per square mile (253.9/km^{2}). There were 134 housing units at an average density of 335.0 per square mile (129.3/km^{2}). The racial makeup of the town was 98.9% White and 1.1% from two or more races. Hispanic or Latino of any race were 5.3% of the population.

There were 115 households, of which 26.1% had children under the age of 18 living with them, 52.2% were married couples living together, 8.7% had a female householder with no husband present, 5.2% had a male householder with no wife present, and 33.9% were non-families. 30.4% of all households were made up of individuals, and 15.6% had someone living alone who was 65 years of age or older. The average household size was 2.29 and the average family size was 2.83.

The median age in the town was 42.3 years. 21.3% of residents were under the age of 18; 4.9% were between the ages of 18 and 24; 25.8% were from 25 to 44; 28.8% were from 45 to 64; and 19% were 65 years of age or older. The gender makeup of the town was 50.6% male and 49.4% female.

=== 2000 census ===
As of the census of 2000, there were 249 people, 103 households, and 69 families residing in the town. The population density was 967.6 people per square mile (369.8/km^{2}). There were 121 housing units at an average density of 470.2 per square mile (179.7/km^{2}). The racial makeup of the town was 97.99% White, 0.80% Native American, 1.20% from other races. Hispanic or Latino of any race were 1.61% of the population.

There were 103 households, out of which 36.9% had children under the age of 18 living with them, 57.3% were married couples living together, 6.8% had a female householder with no husband present, and 33.0% were non-families. 31.1% of all households were made up of individuals, and 12.6% had someone living alone who was 65 years of age or older. The average household size was 2.42 and the average family size was 3.04.

In the town, the population was spread out, with 28.1% under the age of 18, 5.2% from 18 to 24, 28.1% from 25 to 44, 26.5% from 45 to 64, and 12.0% who were 65 years of age or older. The median age was 37 years. For every 100 females, there were 90.1 males. For every 100 females age 18 and over, there were 84.5 males.

The median income for a household in the town was $33,056, and the median income for a family was $40,250. Males had a median income of $25,833 versus $21,875 for females. The per capita income for the town was $16,584. About 10.9% of families and 14.6% of the population were below the poverty line, including 8.6% of those under the age of eighteen and 33.3% of those 65 or over.

== Education ==
Public education in the town of Kaycee is provided by Johnson County School District #1. Kaycee School , a K-12 campus, serves the town.

== Climate ==
According to the Köppen Climate Classification system, Kaycee has a cold semi-arid climate, abbreviated "BSk" on climate maps. The hottest temperature recorded in Kaycee was 107 °F (42 °C) on August 5, 1979, while the coldest temperature recorded was −51 °F (−46 °C) on February 12, 1905.

Climate data for Kaycee, Wyoming, 1991–2020 normals, extremes 1900–present
Month	Jan	Feb	Mar	Apr	May	Jun	Jul	Aug	Sep	Oct	Nov	Dec	Year
Record high °F (°C)	71 (22)	71 (22)	77 (25)	87 (31)	93 (34)	104 (40)	106 (41)	107 (42)	101 (38)	88 (31)	78 (26)	68 (20)	107 (42)
Mean maximum °F (°C)	57.2 (14.0)	58.3 (14.6)	68.7 (20.4)	77.9 (25.5)	85.7 (29.8)	94.8 (34.9)	99.9 (37.7)	98.2 (36.8)	93.4 (34.1)	81.8 (27.7)	68.5 (20.3)	57.7 (14.3)	100.5 (38.1)
Mean daily maximum °F (°C)	37.2 (2.9)	38.6 (3.7)	48.8 (9.3)	55.6 (13.1)	65.7 (18.7)	78.0 (25.6)	87.8 (31.0)	86.4 (30.2)	75.6 (24.2)	59.7 (15.4)	46.8 (8.2)	37.3 (2.9)	59.8 (15.4)
Daily mean °F (°C)	23.4 (−4.8)	25.5 (−3.6)	35.0 (1.7)	42.2 (5.7)	52.2 (11.2)	63.0 (17.2)	71.4 (21.9)	69.4 (20.8)	58.9 (14.9)	45.0 (7.2)	32.7 (0.4)	23.8 (−4.6)	45.2 (7.3)
Mean daily minimum °F (°C)	9.6 (−12.4)	12.5 (−10.8)	21.2 (−6.0)	28.8 (−1.8)	38.7 (3.7)	48.0 (8.9)	55.1 (12.8)	52.4 (11.3)	42.1 (5.6)	30.3 (−0.9)	18.6 (−7.4)	10.3 (−12.1)	30.6 (−0.8)
Mean minimum °F (°C)	−15.3 (−26.3)	−11.0 (−23.9)	2.6 (−16.3)	16.2 (−8.8)	26.2 (−3.2)	37.1 (2.8)	46.4 (8.0)	42.2 (5.7)	30.5 (−0.8)	13.7 (−10.2)	−2.9 (−19.4)	−12.5 (−24.7)	−21.6 (−29.8)
Record low °F (°C)	−45 (−43)	−51 (−46)	−28 (−33)	−5 (−21)	12 (−11)	25 (−4)	31 (−1)	28 (−2)	13 (−11)	−11 (−24)	−37 (−38)	−43 (−42)	−51 (−46)
Average precipitation inches (mm)	0.26 (6.6)	0.41 (10)	0.67 (17)	1.50 (38)	2.75 (70)	1.63 (41)	1.16 (29)	0.70 (18)	1.03 (26)	1.04 (26)	0.46 (12)	0.34 (8.6)	11.95 (302.2)
Average snowfall inches (cm)	5.6 (14)	8.9 (23)	6.5 (17)	3.8 (9.7)	0.6 (1.5)	0.1 (0.25)	0.0 (0.0)	0.0 (0.0)	0.3 (0.76)	2.3 (5.8)	5.8 (15)	6.8 (17)	40.7 (104.01)
Average precipitation days (≥ 0.01 in)	3.1	3.3	4.0	7.2	8.0	6.5	4.5	3.1	4.3	4.7	3.3	3.4	55.4
Average snowy days (≥ 0.1 in)	2.6	2.9	2.6	1.8	0.3	0.0	0.0	0.0	0.2	1.0	2.4	3.3	17.1
Source 1: NOAA
Source 2: National Weather Service
