= Johnson County, Wyoming =

County in Wyoming, United States

- County
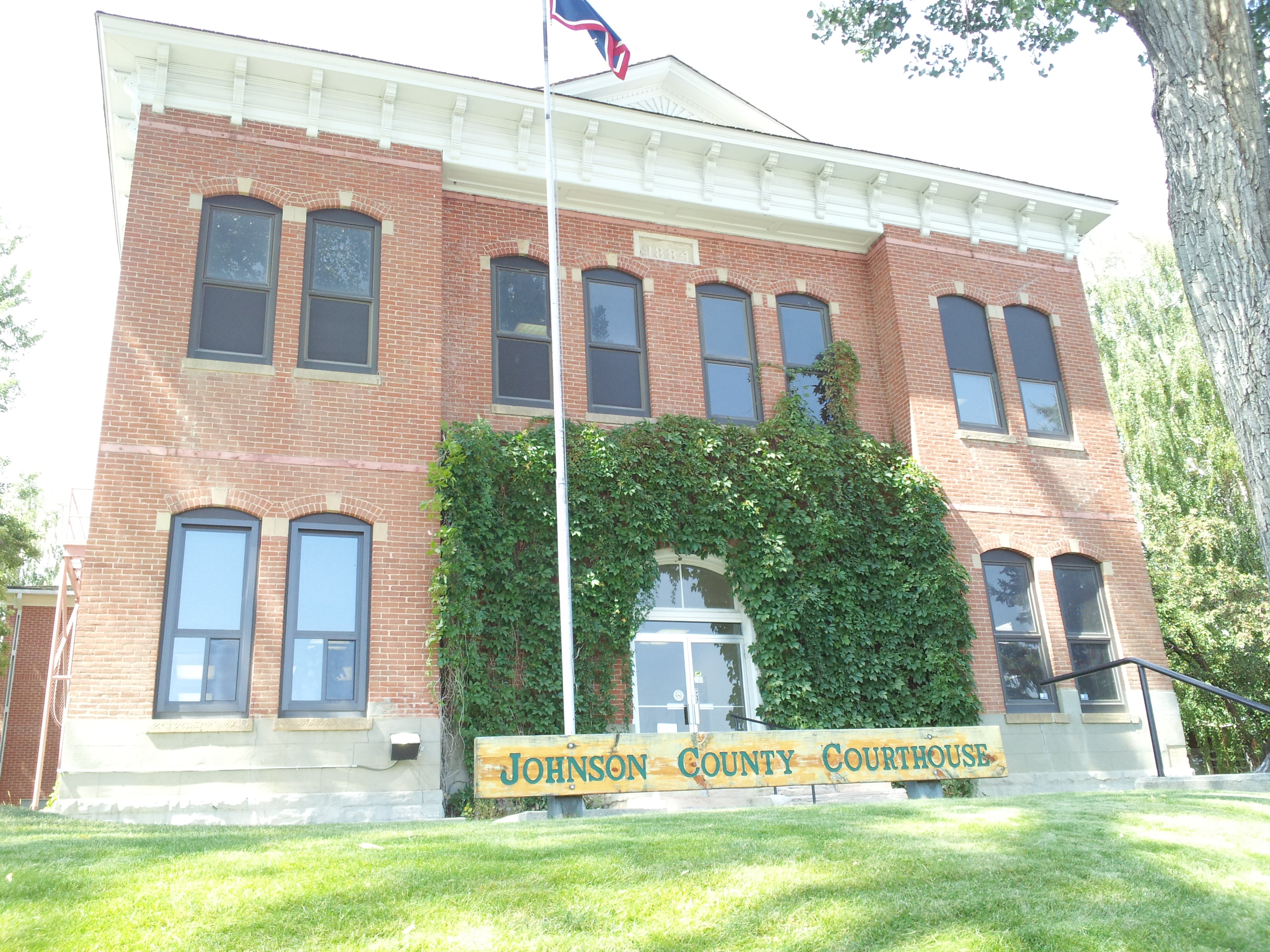
- Johnson County Courthouse

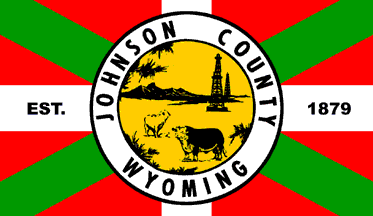
- Flag

- Location within the U.S. state of Wyoming
- Coordinates: 44°02′N 106°35′W
- Country: United States
- State: Wyoming
- Founded: December 8, 1875 (authorized); 1881 (organized)
- Seat: Buffalo
- Largest city: Buffalo

Area
  - Total: 4,175 sq mi (10,810 km^{2})
  - Land: 4,154 sq mi (10,760 km^{2})
  - Water: 20 sq mi (52 km^{2}) 0.5%

Population (2020)
  - Total: 8,447
  - Estimate (2025): 8,908 ▲
  - Density: 2.033/sq mi (0.7851/km^{2})
- Time zone: UTC−7 (Mountain)
  - Summer (DST): UTC−6 (MDT)
- Congressional district: At-large
- Website: www.johnsoncowy.gov

Johnson County is a county in the north central part of the U.S. state of Wyoming. At the 2020 United States census, the population was 8,447. The county seat is Buffalo. Kaycee is the only other incorporated town in the county. Johnson County lies to the southeast of the Bighorn Mountains along Interstate 25 and Interstate 90. The Powder River flows northward through eastern Johnson County.

== History ==
Johnson County was created on December 8, 1875, as Pease County from parts of Albany, Carbon and Sweetwater Counties. It was organized in 1881. The county was initially named for Dr. E. L. Pease of Uinta County. But, in 1879, the county was renamed Johnson, for E. P. Johnson, a Cheyenne attorney.

In 1888, Sheridan County was created from a portion of Johnson County. In 1890, Big Horn County was created from Johnson County along with land from Fremont County and Sheridan County.

From 1889 to 1893, Johnson County was the scene of the Johnson County War, where wealthy cattle ranchers seeking to control limited resources enlisted hired guns to fight smaller settlers and homesteaders.

In 1911, the boundaries of Johnson County and adjacent Crook, Natrona and Weston Counties were adjusted to run along federal land survey lines.

== Geography ==
According to the US Census Bureau, the county has an area of 4,175 square miles (10,810 km^{2}), of which 4,154 square miles (10,760 km^{2}) is land and 20 square miles (52 km^{2}) (0.5%) is water.

=== Adjacent counties ===
- Sheridan County (north)
- Campbell County (east)
- Converse County (southeast)
- Natrona County (south)
- Washakie County (west)
- Big Horn County (northwest)

=== Major highways ===
- Interstate 25
- Interstate 90
- U.S. Highway 16
- U.S. Highway 87
- Wyoming Highway 192
- Wyoming Highway 193
- Wyoming Highway 196
- Wyoming Highway 387

=== Transit ===
- Express Arrow
- Jefferson Lines

=== National protected area ===
- Bighorn National Forest (part)

== Demographics ==
Historical population
Census	Pop.	Note	%±
1880	637		—
1890	2,357		270.0%
1900	2,361		0.2%
1910	3,453		46.3%
1920	4,617		33.7%
1930	4,816		4.3%
1940	4,980		3.4%
1950	4,707		−5.5%
1960	5,475		16.3%
1970	5,587		2.0%
1980	6,700		19.9%
1990	6,145		−8.3%
2000	7,075		15.1%
2010	8,569		21.1%
2020	8,447		−1.4%
2025 (est.)	8,908	▲	5.5%
US Decennial Census; 1870–2000 2010–2016

=== 2020 census ===
As of the 2020 census, the county had a population of 8,447. Of the residents, 20.9% were under the age of 18 and 26.0% were 65 years of age or older; the median age was 48.0 years. For every 100 females there were 99.4 males, and for every 100 females age 18 and over there were 98.8 males.

Johnson County, Wyoming – Racial and ethnic composition Note: the US Census treats Hispanic/Latino as an ethnic category. This table excludes Latinos from the racial categories and assigns them to a separate category. Hispanics/Latinos may be of any race.
Race / Ethnicity (NH = Non-Hispanic)	Pop 2000	Pop 2010	Pop 2020	% 2000	% 2010	% 2020
White alone (NH)	6,771	8,092	7,640	95.70%	94.43%	90.45%
Black or African American alone (NH)	5	14	26	0.07%	0.16%	0.31%
Native American or Alaska Native alone (NH)	42	72	69	0.59%	0.84%	0.82%
Asian alone (NH)	4	36	15	0.06%	0.42%	0.18%
Pacific Islander alone (NH)	0	0	7	0.00%	0.00%	0.08%
Other race alone (NH)	7	6	28	0.10%	0.07%	0.33%
Mixed race or Multiracial (NH)	98	73	315	1.39%	0.85%	3.73%
Hispanic or Latino (any race)	148	276	347	2.09%	3.22%	4.11%
Total	7,075	8,569	8,447	100.00%	100.00%	100.00%

The racial makeup of the county was 92.0% White, 0.3% Black or African American, 0.9% American Indian and Alaska Native, 0.2% Asian, 1.3% from some other race, and 5.2% from two or more races. Hispanic or Latino residents of any race comprised 4.1% of the population.

There were 3,718 households in the county, of which 25.1% had children under the age of 18 living with them and 23.4% had a female householder with no spouse or partner present. About 31.4% of all households were made up of individuals and 16.3% had someone living alone who was 65 years of age or older.

There were 4,598 housing units, of which 19.1% were vacant. Among occupied housing units, 75.6% were owner-occupied and 24.4% were renter-occupied. The homeowner vacancy rate was 2.0% and the rental vacancy rate was 13.6%.

=== 2010 census ===
At the 2010 United States census, there were 8,569 people, 3,782 households, and 2,410 families in the county. The population density was 2.1 people per square mile (0.81 people/km^{2}). There were 4,553 housing units at an average density of 1.1 units per square mile (0.42 units/km^{2}). The racial makeup was 96.5% white, 1.1% American Indian, 0.4% Asian, 0.2% black or African American, 0.7% from other races, and 1.1% from two or more races. Those of Hispanic or Latino origin made up 3.2% of the population. In terms of ancestry, 31.6% were German, 22.4% were Irish, 18.3% were English, and 6.1% were American.

Of the 3,782 households, 26.1% had children under the age of 18 living with them, 53.5% were married couples living together, 6.7% had a female householder with no husband present, 36.3% were non-families, and 31.8% of all households were made up of individuals. The average household size was 2.25 and the average family size was 2.83. The median age was 44.8 years.

The median household income was $45,638 and the median family income was $58,983. Males had a median income of $40,572 and females $30,352. The per capita income was $26,753. About 5.9% of families and 8.2% of the population were below the poverty line, including 8.0% of those under age 18 and 7.3% of those age 65 or over.

=== 2000 census ===
At the 2000 United States census, there were 7,075 people, 2,959 households and 2,006 families in the county. The population density was 2 people per square mile (0.77 people/km^{2}). There were 3,503 housing units at an average density of 0.8 units per square mile (0.31 units/km^{2}). The racial makeup of the county was 97.03% White, 0.08% Black or African American, 0.64% Native American, 0.11% Asian, 0.55% from other races, and 1.58% from two or more races. 2.09% of the population were Hispanic or Latino of any race. 27.0% were of German, 15.2% English, 10.8% Irish and 7.9% American ancestry.

There were 2,959 households, of which 28.70% had children under the age of 18 living with them, 57.00% were married couples living together, 7.10% had a female householder with no husband present, and 32.20% were non-families. 28.50% of all households were made up of individuals, and 12.00% had someone living alone who was 65 years of age or older. The average household size was 2.36 and the average family size was 2.89.

24.20% of the population were under the age of 18, 5.60% from 18 to 24, 23.50% from 25 to 44, 28.70% from 45 to 64, and 18.00% who were 65 years of age or older. The median age was 43 years. For every 100 females there were 96.60 males. For every 100 females age 18 and over, there were 94.30 males.

The median household income was $34,012 and the median family income was $42,299. Males had a median income of $29,271 and females $20,469. The per capita income was $19,030. About 7.20% of families and 10.10% of the population were below the poverty line, including 9.10% of those under age 18 and 10.60% of those age 65 or over.

== Communities ==
=== City ===
- Buffalo (county seat)

=== Town ===
- Kaycee

=== Unincorporated communities ===
- Hazelton
- Linch
- Mayoworth
- Saddlestring
- Sussex

== Government and infrastructure ==
Johnson County voters are reliably Republican. Since Wyoming statehood, the voters of this county have selected the Democratic Party candidate in only three national elections: William Jennings Bryan in 1896; Woodrow Wilson in 1912 by two votes and with only 37.5 percent of the total vote (due to Roosevelt's independent run that year); and Franklin D. Roosevelt by seventy votes in his 1932 landslide. FDR did not carry the county in his re-election campaigns; in 1936 Johnson was Alf Landon’s second-best county in the Western United States behind Rio Blanco County, Colorado. In the 1964 Democratic landslide it was Barry Goldwater's best county in Wyoming, and second-best in the West behind Utah's traditional banner Republican county of Kane.

United States presidential election results for Johnson County, Wyoming
Year	Republican		Democratic		Third party(ies)	
Year	No.	%	No.	%	No.	%
1892	309	34.30%	0	0.00%	592	65.70%
1896	284	37.72%	467	62.02%	2	0.27%
1900	466	51.43%	440	48.57%	0	0.00%
1904	725	60.82%	459	38.51%	8	0.67%
1908	781	55.39%	614	43.55%	15	1.06%
1912	522	37.39%	524	37.54%	350	25.07%
1916	814	49.15%	812	49.03%	30	1.81%
1920	1,202	69.36%	525	30.29%	6	0.35%
1924	1,097	58.01%	501	26.49%	293	15.49%
1928	1,369	69.25%	590	29.84%	18	0.91%
1932	1,101	47.05%	1,171	50.04%	68	2.91%
1936	1,266	54.26%	949	40.68%	118	5.06%
1940	1,460	64.98%	781	34.76%	6	0.27%
1944	1,384	64.67%	756	35.33%	0	0.00%
1948	1,351	66.06%	682	33.35%	12	0.59%
1952	1,980	78.45%	543	21.51%	1	0.04%
1956	1,842	76.12%	578	23.88%	0	0.00%
1960	1,806	69.35%	798	30.65%	0	0.00%
1964	1,640	65.81%	852	34.19%	0	0.00%
1968	1,737	73.85%	398	16.92%	217	9.23%
1972	2,203	83.13%	436	16.45%	11	0.42%
1976	2,042	71.25%	797	27.81%	27	0.94%
1980	2,291	72.78%	635	20.17%	222	7.05%
1984	2,634	81.27%	558	17.22%	49	1.51%
1988	2,081	72.81%	707	24.74%	70	2.45%
1992	1,614	51.30%	656	20.85%	876	27.84%
1996	2,071	62.59%	815	24.63%	423	12.78%
2000	2,886	81.30%	555	15.63%	109	3.07%
2004	3,231	80.96%	676	16.94%	84	2.10%
2008	3,334	76.57%	908	20.85%	112	2.57%
2012	3,363	78.96%	749	17.59%	147	3.45%
2016	3,477	78.72%	638	14.44%	302	6.84%
2020	3,881	78.98%	897	18.25%	136	2.77%
2024	3,936	80.36%	847	17.29%	115	2.35%

The Wyoming Department of Health Veteran's Home of Wyoming, an assisted living facility for veterans and their dependents, is in Buffalo. The Wyoming Board of Charities and Reform operated the facility until the agency was dissolved as a result of a state constitutional amendment passed in November 1990.

== See also ==
- National Register of Historic Places listings in Johnson County, Wyoming
- Wyoming
  - List of cities and towns in Wyoming
  - List of counties in Wyoming
  - Wyoming statistical areas
