= National Register of Historic Places listings in Johnson County, Wyoming =

National Register of Historic Places listings in Johnson

Location of Johnson County in Wyoming

This is a list of the National Register of Historic Places listings in Johnson County, Wyoming. It is intended to be a complete list of the properties and districts on the National Register of Historic Places in Johnson County, Wyoming, United States. The locations of National Register properties and districts for which the latitude and longitude coordinates are included below, may be seen in an online map.

There are 28 properties and districts listed on the National Register in the county, 1 of which is a National Historic Landmark.

This National Park Service list is complete through NPS recent listings posted November 21, 2025.

Contents: Counties in Wyoming
Albany - Big Horn - Campbell - Carbon - Converse - Crook - Fremont - Goshen - Hot Springs - Johnson - Laramie - Lincoln - Natrona - Niobrara - Park - Platte - Sheridan - Sublette - Sweetwater - Teton - Uinta - Washakie - Weston

== Listings county-wide ==
	Name on the Register	Image	Date listed	Location	City or town	Description
1	AJX Bridge over South Fork and Powder River	AJX Bridge over South Fork and Powder River	February 22, 1985 (#85000426)	Interstate 25 W. Service Rd. (old U.S. Route 87); 43°37′13″N 106°34′37″W	Kaycee	Wyoming’s only large cantilever bridge, a three-span Pratt deck truss built 1931–32.
2	Beaver Creek Ranch Headquarters		January 8, 2014 (#13001064)	2333 Beaver Creek Rd. 44°05′56″N 106°03′00″W	Buffalo vicinity	A rare and well-preserved example of a 20th-century sheep ranch employing Spanish and French Basque practices, with nine contributing properties built 1916–1950s.
3	Blue Gables Motel	Blue Gables Motel	November 1, 2011 (#11000772)	662 N. Main St. 44°21′19″N 106°41′57″W	Buffalo	Western-themed motor court with free-standing log cabins, whose modernizations 1941–1967 reflect the heyday of post-World War II automobile tourism in Wyoming.
4	Cantonment Reno	Cantonment Reno	July 29, 1977 (#77001382)	5 miles north of Sussex at the Powder River; 43°47′06″N 106°15′13″W	Sussex	Site of an Army supply post 1876–1878 during U.S. military campaigns against the High Plains Indians, a vestige of the bitter intercultural conflict over the resources and lifestyle of the region.
5	Carnegie Public Library	Carnegie Public Library	November 7, 1976 (#76001949)	90 N. Main St. 44°20′53″N 106°42′00″W	Buffalo	1909 Carnegie library, exemplifying Neoclassical architecture and the local zeal to provide library services while still less than a decade into Wyoming's statehood. Became the Jim Gatchell Memorial Museum in 1987.
6	Dull Knife Battlefield	Dull Knife Battlefield	August 15, 1979 (#79002609)	North of Barnum; 43°45′36″N 106°56′55″W	Barnum vicinity	Site of the Dull Knife Fight on November 25, 1876—an Army attack on a winter village of Northern Cheyenne, a consequential point in the U.S. campaign to force the Plains Indians onto reservations.
7	EDL Peloux Bridge	EDL Peloux Bridge	February 22, 1985 (#85000425)	Off N. Desmet Ave. 44°20′42″N 106°42′16″W	Buffalo	Pratt pony truss bridge built 1912–13; an early and well-preserved example of a once-common configuration. Relocated to Buffalo City Park in 1986.
8	EDZ Irigary Bridge	EDZ Irigary Bridge	February 22, 1985 (#85000427)	Irigary Rd. over the Powder River; 43°56′22″N 106°09′27″W	Sussex	At 200 feet (61 m) Wyoming's longest single span of a county bridge still in use, and one of only two pin-connected Pennsylvania trusses. Built in 1913 and moved to current location in 1963.
9	Fort McKinney	Fort McKinney	July 30, 1976 (#76001950)	700 Veterans Ln. 44°19′58″N 106°44′22″W	Buffalo	Frontier U.S. Army fort with some preserved buildings, active 1878–1894; the key military presence in the Powder River Basin from the American Indian Wars to the Johnson County War, and attractor of agricultural settlement as both a protector and customer. Since 1903 the Veterans' Home of Wyoming.
10	Fort Phil Kearny and Associated Sites	Fort Phil Kearny and Associated Sites	October 15, 1966 (#66000756)	528 Wagon Box Rd. 44°31′54″N 106°49′32″W	Story	Sites of a partially reconstructed U.S. Army fort, the Fetterman Fight, and the Wagon Box Fight—storied locations in Red Cloud's War 1866–1868, which resulted in renewed Native control of the region for several years.
11	Fort Reno	Fort Reno	April 28, 1970 (#70000672)	Lower Sussex Rd. 43°49′39″N 106°14′26″W	Sussex	Site of a U.S. Army fort manned 1865–1868 to protect emigrants on the Bozeman Trail from vigorous Oglala defense of their sacred hunting grounds. Marked with a monument and interpretive signs.
12	HF Bar Ranch Historic District		November 7, 1984 (#84000392)	1301 Rock Creek Rd. 44°27′28″N 106°53′57″W	Saddlestring	1890s cattle ranch diversified into a dude ranch in 1911, a continuously operating example of an important regional enterprise that enriched the American West economically and culturally, and highlighted the need to preserve the west's recreational resources and traditions.
13	Holland House	Holland House	November 4, 1993 (#93001185)	312 N. Main St. 44°21′03″N 106°41′58″W	Buffalo	One of Buffalo's first brick houses, built in 1883 for rancher and county official William H. Holland (1840–1906) and later the home of his grandson William C. Holland (d. 1993), attorney and politician.
14	Jameson Site	Jameson Site	September 13, 2018 (#100002942)	Address restricted	Barnum vicinity	Site in a natural passage between the Bighorn Mountains and Powder River basin yielding artifacts from the middle Plains Archaic to the Protohistoric period, including a hearth, bundle of gambling sticks, and rock art.
15	Johnson County Courthouse	Johnson County Courthouse	November 7, 1976 (#76001951)	76 N. Main St. 44°20′52″N 106°41′58″W	Buffalo	Wyoming's oldest intact county courthouse continuously operating under its original use, built in Italianate style in 1884.
16	Lake Desmet Segment, Bozeman Trail	Lake Desmet Segment, Bozeman Trail	July 23, 1989 (#89000814)	Address restricted 44°28′45″N 106°46′56″W	Buffalo	1.1-mile (1.8 km) stretch of wheel ruts from wagons using the Bozeman Trail.
17	Main Street Historic District	Main Street Historic District	April 12, 1984 (#84003676)	Main St. 44°20′46″N 106°41′56″W	Buffalo	One of Wyoming's most distinctive and intact commercial centers representing the prosperity achieved through ranching, agriculture, tourism, and mineral extraction; with 12 contributing properties built 1900–1932.
18	Methodist Episcopal Church	Methodist Episcopal Church	September 13, 1976 (#76001952)	132 N. Adams Ave. 44°20′54″N 106°42′03″W	Buffalo	Finely planned and crafted small church built on the Akron Plan in 1899.
19	Powder River Station-Powder River Crossing (48JO134 and 48JO801)	Powder River Station-Powder River Crossing (48JO134 and 48JO801)	July 23, 1989 (#89000810)	Address restricted 43°47′07″N 106°14′41″W	Sussex	Open floodplain with well-preserved wagon ruts from the Bozeman Trail, and the site of a stagecoach station.
20	St. Luke's Episcopal Church	St. Luke's Episcopal Church	November 7, 1976 (#76001953)	178 S. Main St. 44°20′40″N 106°41′53″W	Buffalo	One of Wyoming's leading examples of Gothic Revival architecture—an 1889 church whose original members were key figures in Buffalo's and Johnson County's early history.
21	Spear-O-Wigwam Ranch		February 23, 2016 (#16000053)	Forest Service Rd. 293; 44°33′04″N 107°12′38″W	Story	One of the longest operating dude ranches in the Bighorn Mountains, established in 1923. Also noted for its rustic architecture, with a unique lodge shaped like the ranch's brand and eight other contributing properties.
22	Sussex Post Office and Store	Sussex Post Office and Store	November 12, 1998 (#98001377)	Sussex Rd. and the Powder River; 43°41′51″N 106°17′43″W	Sussex	Long-serving social and civic center of a dispersed ranching community, built in 1914 as a post office, grocery store, and dance hall, and entirely an event venue and polling place since the 1920s.
23	TA Ranch Historic District	TA Ranch Historic District	March 26, 1993 (#93000198)	28623 Old Highway 87; 44°09′15″N 106°41′14″W	Buffalo vicinity	One of Johnson County's first cattle ranches, established in 1882, and the best preserved site from the 1889–1893 Johnson County War, with extant breastworks and battle damage from a three-day siege in April 1892.
24	Trabing Station-Crazy Woman Crossing	Trabing Station-Crazy Woman Crossing	July 23, 1989 (#89000815)	1480 Buffalo Sussex Cutoff Rd. 44°05′03″N 106°31′27″W	Buffalo vicinity	Ford and campsite on the Bozeman Trail, site of one of the trail's most dramatic battles between the U.S. military and Native Americans, on July 20, 1866, and a U.S. staging point during the Great Sioux War of 1876. Marked with interpretive signs.
25	Union Congregational Church and Parsonage	Union Congregational Church and Parsonage	February 7, 1985 (#85000248)	110 Bennett St. 44°20′43″N 106°41′46″W	Buffalo	1886 church altered and enlarged 1911–12, with a 1910 parsonage. One of the first two churches established in northern Wyoming Territory; significant as the only venue for refined or family-friendly activities in a rough pioneer community.
26	US Post Office-Buffalo Main	US Post Office-Buffalo Main	May 19, 1987 (#87000785)	193 S. Main St. 44°20′42″N 106°41′51″W	Buffalo	Well-preserved example of a Neoclassical combined post office and federal building, completed in 1928; a long-sought amenity and validation of Buffalo's importance.
27	Wold Bison Jump		December 22, 2015 (#15000928)	Address restricted	Barnum vicinity	Late Prehistoric buffalo jump with a deep bonebed, numerous artifacts, and 67 cairns.
28	Wold Rock Art District		September 9, 2021 (#100006877)	Address restricted	Barnum vicinity	

== See also ==
- List of National Historic Landmarks in Wyoming
- National Register of Historic Places listings in Wyoming
