= EDZ Irigary Bridge =

- U.S. National Register of Historic Places
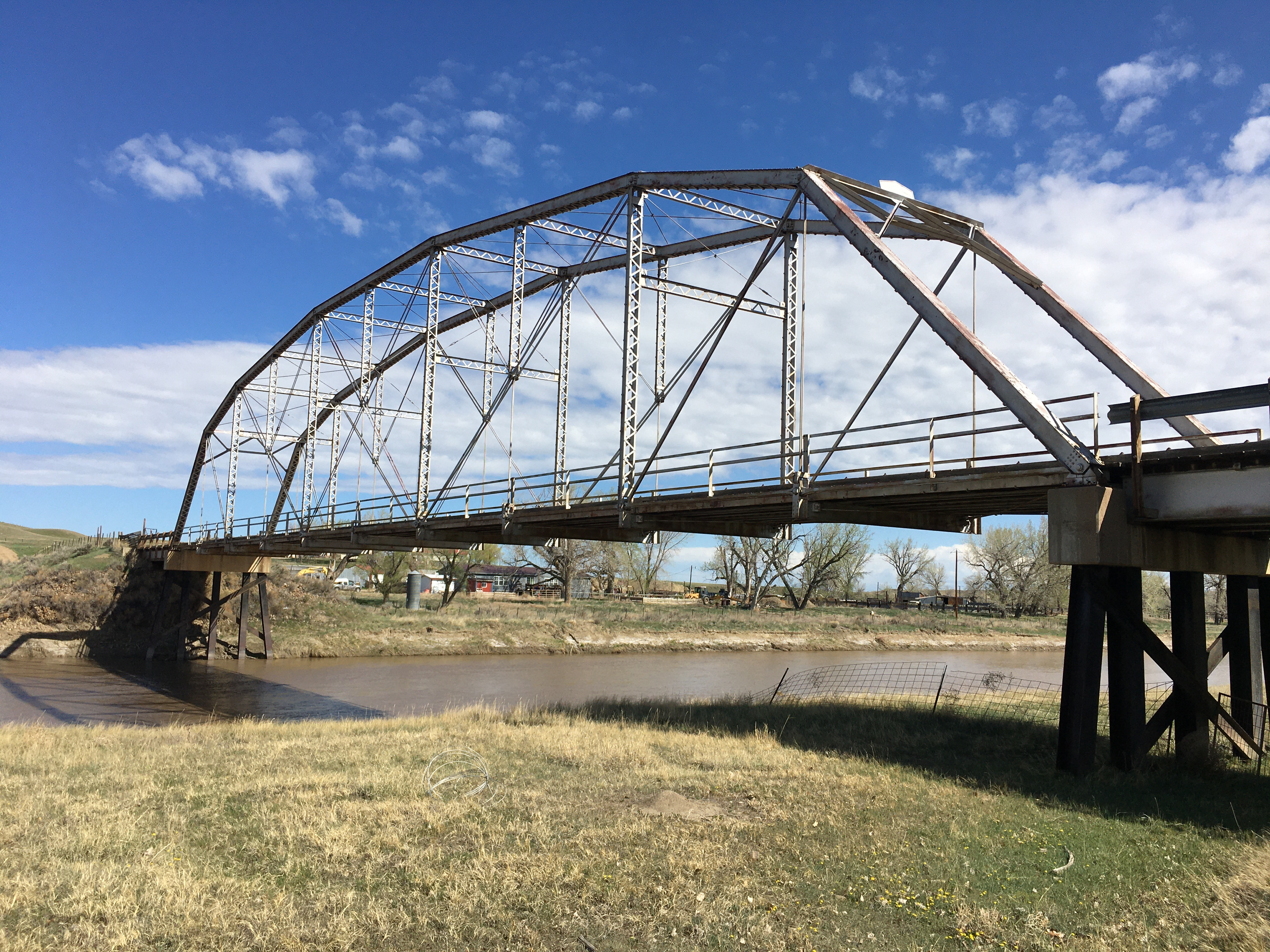
- 2023 Photo

- Location within Wyoming Location within the United States
- Nearest city: Kaycee, Wyoming
- Coordinates: 43°56′22″N 106°09′27″W
- Area: less than one acre
- Built: 1913
- Built by: Canton Bridge Company
- Architectural style: Pennsylvania through truss
- MPS: Vehicular Truss and Arch Bridges in Wyoming TR
- NRHP reference No.: 85000427
- Added to NRHP: February 22, 1985

The EDZ Irigary Bridge is a historic Pennsylvania truss bridge in southeastern Johnson County, Wyoming. The bridge was built in 1913 at Sussex, Wyoming, and moved in 1963 to Irigary Road. The bridge was listed on the National Register of Historic Places in 1985 as part of a Multiple Property Submission devoted to historic bridges in Wyoming.

== Design ==
The Pratt truss was invented in 1844 by Thomas and Caleb Pratt. A Pratt truss has vertical members and diagonals that slope down towards the center. The interior diagonals are under tension, and the vertical elements are under compression. The Pennsylvania truss is a variation on the Pratt truss. While the Pratt truss has braced diagonal members in all panels, the Pennsylvania truss has half-length struts or ties in the top, bottom, or both parts of the panels. The Pennsylvania truss is named after the Pennsylvania Railroad, which pioneered this design. The Pennsylvania truss was once used for hundreds of bridges in the United States but the design fell out of favor in the 1930s and only a few such bridges remain. The EDZ Irigary Bridge, with a span of 200 feet (61 m), has the longest clear span of any county bridge still in use in Wyoming, and is one of the most important historic bridges in Wyoming.

== Construction ==
On February 4, 1913, Johnson County awarded the contract for this bridge over the Powder River at Sussex, Wyoming, about 20 miles (32 km) east of Kaycee. The parts for the new bridge were fabricated by the Canton Bridge Company of Canton, Ohio. The bridge at Sussex replaced two earlier bridges at Powder River Crossing, located about 6 miles (10 km) to the north.

The small community of Sussex, Wyoming, grew up around the bridge, and the Sussex Post Office and Store was built the following year in 1914. The Black and Yellow Trail was established in 1915, and it crossed the Powder River using the new bridge, until the trail was rerouted through Arvada, Wyoming to the north a few years later. The road at Sussex eventually became Wyoming Highway 192.

In 1963, a new concrete bridge was built about 200 yards (183 m) upstream from the EDZ Irigary Bridge. The old steel bridge was moved by the Etlin Construction Company of Casper, Wyoming. The bridge now crosses the Powder River 18 miles (29 km) downstream from Sussex on Johnson County Road 172 (Irigary Road).

== See also ==
- List of bridges documented by the Historic American Engineering Record in Wyoming

== Gallery ==
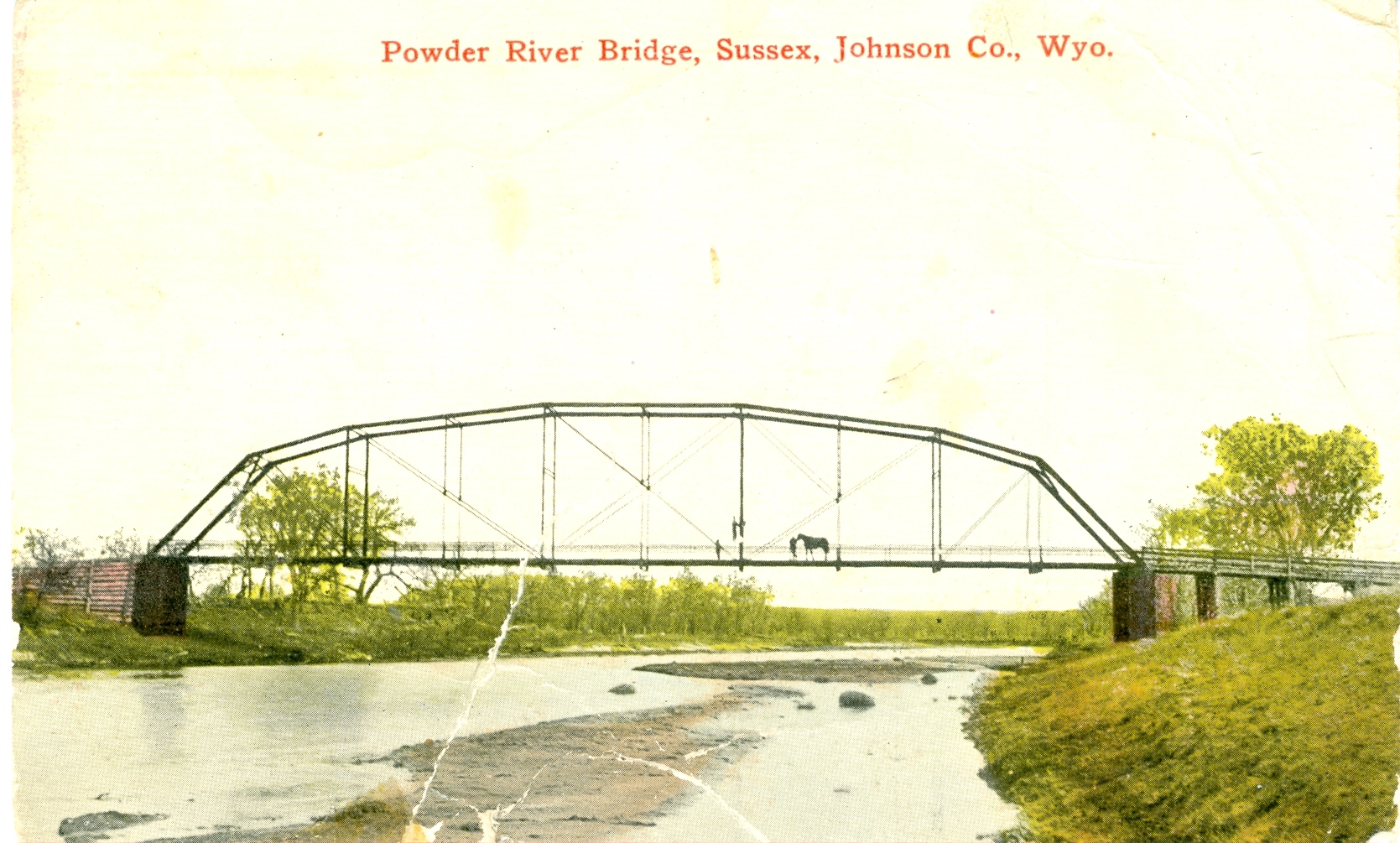
Early postcard

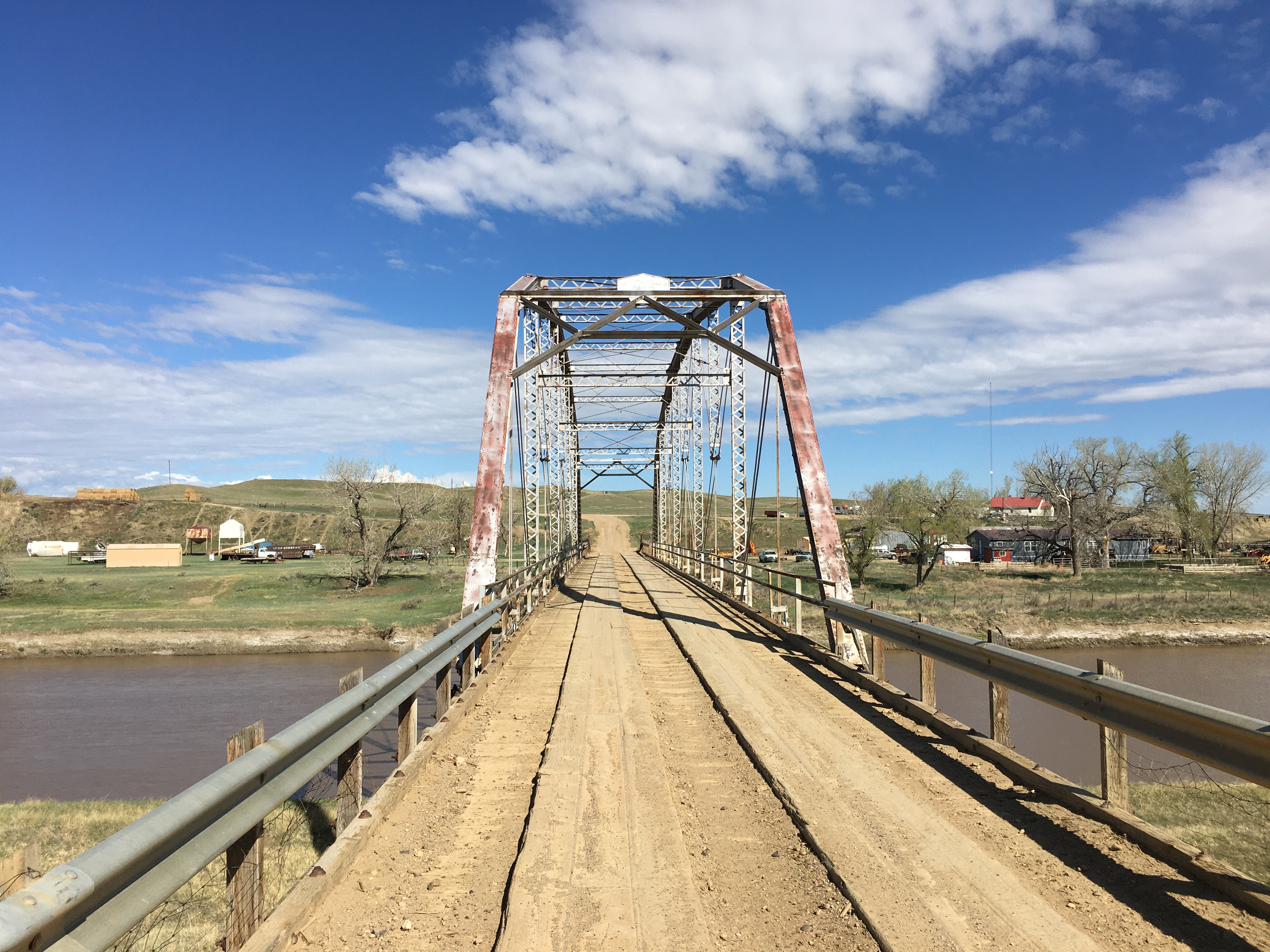
2023 Photo

https://en.wikipedia.org/wiki/File:PowderRiver23.jpg
