= Sussex Post Office and Store =

- U.S. National Register of Historic Places
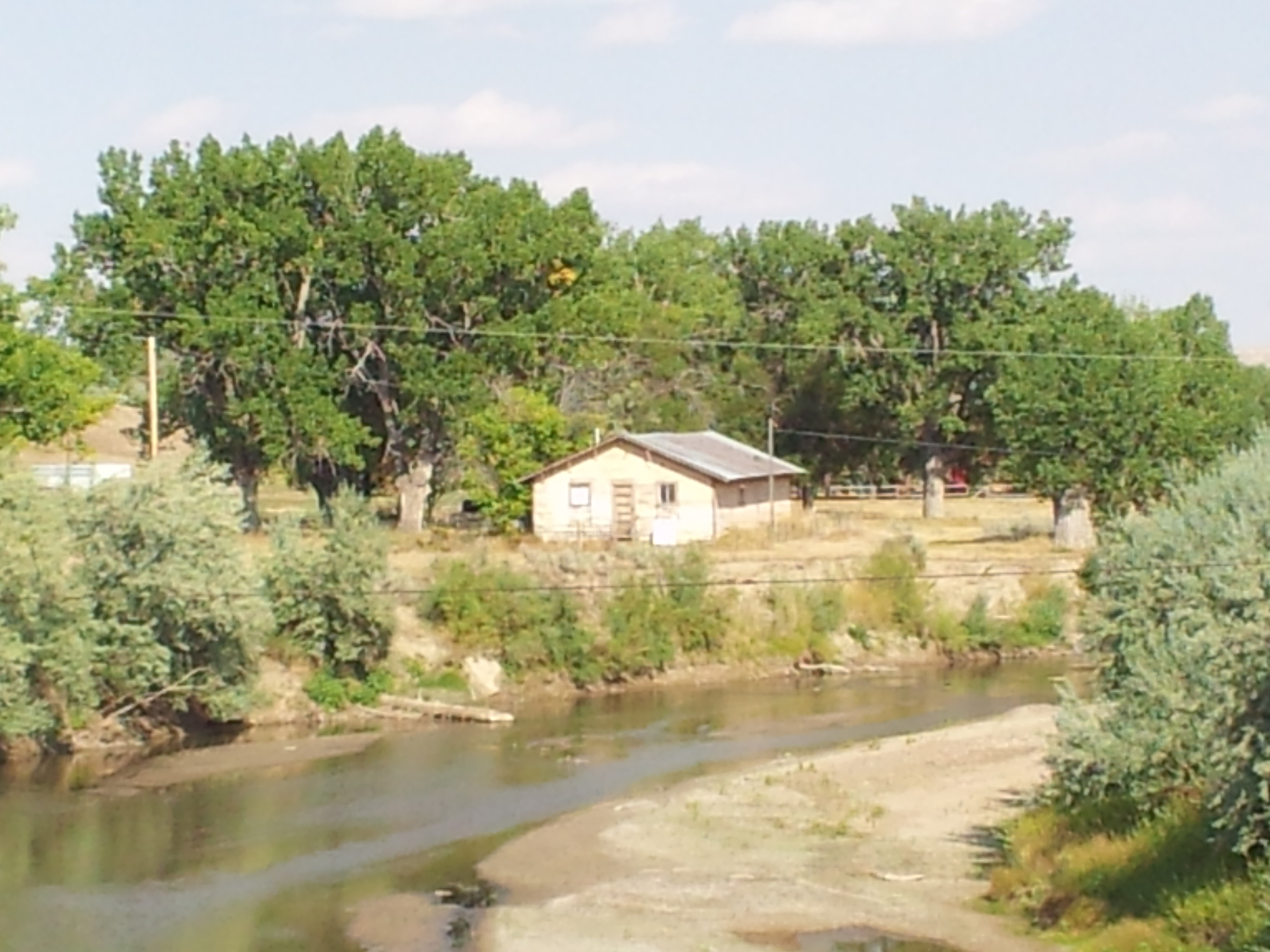

- Location within Wyoming Location within the United States
- Location: Wyoming Highway 192 (Sussex Road) and Powder River, near Kaycee, Wyoming
- Coordinates: 43°41′52″N 106°17′40″W
- Area: 4.8 acres (1.9 ha)
- Built: 1914
- NRHP reference No.: 98001377
- Added to NRHP: November 12, 1998

The Sussex Post Office and Store, also known as Sussex Community Hall, is located on the north bank of the Powder River in southeast Johnson County about twenty miles east of Kaycee, Wyoming. The store was built in 1914, and was listed on the National Register of Historic Places in 1998.

== History ==
The Bozeman Trail crossed the Powder River at several points in the area around Sussex, Wyoming. Because of the river crossing, Fort Reno and Cantonment Reno were established in the 1800s near Sussex. Fort Reno, located eight miles downstream (northeast) from Sussex on the Powder River, was built in 1865 as one in a series of military posts to protect travelers on the Bozeman Trail. The fort was abandoned in 1868 and burned, reportedly by Indians. In 1877, Cantonment Reno, five miles downstream from Sussex, was established as a supply depot for the Powder River Campaign of 1876. In 1878, the cantonment was closed, and the soldiers relocated to Fort McKinney near Buffalo, Wyoming.

After the soldiers left, a few civilians remained across the Power River from the cantonment, and they established a settlement known as Powder River Station-Powder River Crossing. By 1880, this community of 49 people included a stage station, a hotel, a general store, and a post office.

In the early 1880s, Henry Winter ("Hard Winter") Davis, established the Spectacle Ranch near the present site of Sussex. The post office at Powder River Station-Powder River Crossing moved to the Davis ranch in 1893 or 1894. The active freight route along the Bozeman Trail that connected the military outposts between Cheyenne and Buffalo developed into roads, and Sussex became a stop along the way.

Morris Leitner, known as the "Sage of Sussex", came to Sussex around 1900. He built his home at the Sussex river crossing, and became postmaster, and ran a store from his home. Leitner also taught school, served as justice of the peace, notary public, and county assessor. After some years, he was appointed to the State Board of Equalization, and he moved to Cheyenne in 1938. A steel bridge, the EDZ Irigary Bridge, was built over the Powder River at Sussex in 1914. From 1912 to about 1920, Sussex was on the route of the Black and Yellow Trail which went from Chicago to the Black Hills and Yellowstone National Park. In 1914, the same year the bridge was completed, Leitner erected a new building to house the post office, store, and dance hall. This building became known as the Sussex Community Hall.

== Building ==
The Sussex Community Hall is a one-story, wood-framed building that measures 86 feet long and 26 feet wide. It rests on a concrete foundation and has an unfinished basement. The original siding remains, and corrugated sheet metal covers the asphalt-shingled roof. A stove pipe protrudes through the roof on the southeast slope. The long rectangular building is unadorned except for simple knee braces and brackets under the wide overhanging eaves, corner boards, and plain window surrounds.

The building was originally constructed in 1914 as a combination grocery store/post office/dance hall housed in one large room. The store and post office were located at the east end of the building and the dance hall on the west end. In the late 1920s, the store and post office moved to a renovated garage east of the present building, and the entire room became devoted to a dance hall/community center.

The dance hall included a stage on the north wall and a small band stand on the west wall. The stage was often used for school Christmas pageants and "home-talent" plays performed by community members. In the early 1950s, the lean-to on the north side where dinners were served collapsed and the floor needed replacing after many years of hard use. The stage was removed and a partially enclosed kitchen erected from which dinners could be both prepared and served. During this same renovation, the front door and all windows were altered and/or added. The outhouse and vestibule received modifications, wood paneling was placed on the interior walls, and a drop ceiling installed. Although the building was also electrified around this time, it still lacks indoor plumbing today.

== Current status ==
The Sussex Community Hall was an active place for many years, hosting such varied activities as Halloween, Christmas and Thanksgiving suppers, Mother-Daughter banquets; "harvest suppers"; wedding receptions; picnics and barbecues; home-talent plays; school programs, and annual meetings of the Sussex Irrigation Company.

The two decades following World War II brought many changes to the community of Sussex. In 1954–1955, a new bridge was built over Powder River about one hundred yards west of Sussex, and the old steel bridge was moved to a ranch downstream. The Sussex Road (Wyoming Highway 192) was paved in 1956. The dilapidated Sussex Hotel burned down in 1962. A large flood of the Powder River in 1962 destroyed the new Sussex store and post office adjacent to the Sussex Community Hall. The post office was relocated to Kaycee, Wyoming in 1963. Use of the old hall fell off with the advent of better roads, more cars, and television which helped create a different type of social interaction than that type provided by community centers. The Sussex Women's Club bought the building from Maude Leitner in the year of the flood (1962), and continued to operate and maintain it until its sale to the Sussex Ditch Company in 1995.
