= Nihill =

Nihill is a surname. Some notable people with the surname are:

- John Nihill (1850–1908), Irish-born soldier in the U.S. Army
- Julie Nihill (born 1957), Australian actress
- Paul Nihill (1939–2020), British race walker
- Philippa Nihill, bass player for the Underground Lovers
- Torsten Nihill, drummer for Omega Lithium
- Dave Nihill, Irish comedian
