= Lake De Smet =

Lake in Wyoming, United States

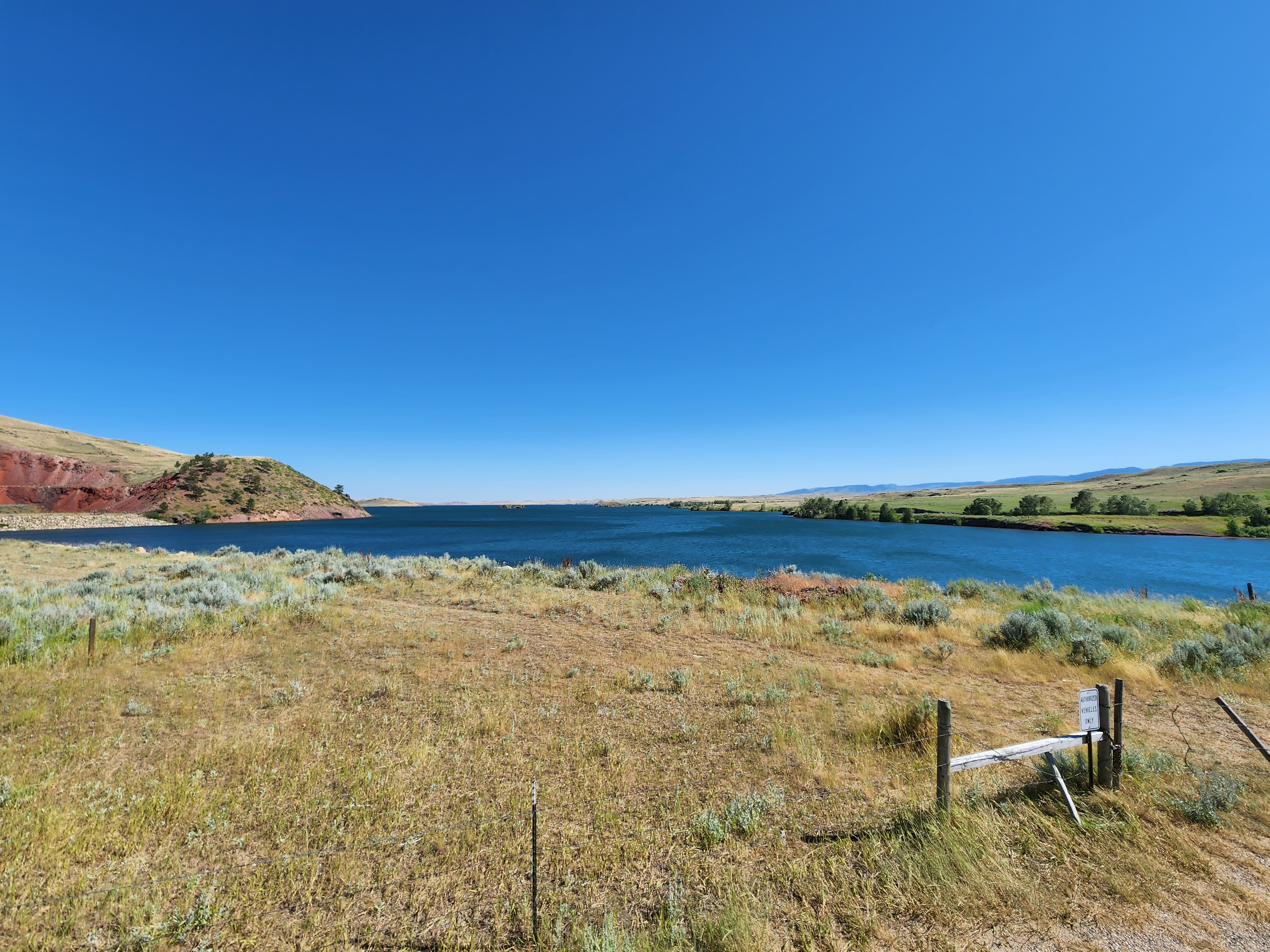
- View from Lower Piney Creek Road

- Location within Wyoming Lake De Smet (the United States)
- Location: Johnson County, Wyoming
- Coordinates: 44°27′58″N 106°44′18″W
- Surface elevation: 4,570 feet (1,390 m)

Lake De Smet is a lake located in Johnson County, Wyoming. It services Johnson County with water for industrial, agricultural, and municipal uses. With a maximum depth of 120 feet, and a capacity of 234,897 acre feet, Johnson County is responsible for 68.27% of its annual maintenance and operation costs, while the state of Wyoming covers the other 31.73%.

First described by Pierre-Jean De Smet, a Jesuit priest, in a letter dated August 24, 1851, it was a highly saline lake capable of housing only limited aquatic life in its early years. Throughout its history, it changed hands multiple times, with its owners including Levi Leiter, Reynolds Mining, and Texaco. In 1865, the Powder River Expedition passed by the lake during its military operations against various Native American people, including the Lakota Sioux, the Cheyenne, and the Arapaho. The Lake Desmet Segment of the Bozeman Trail is located around a mile west to the lake.
