= St. Luke's Episcopal Church (Buffalo, Wyoming) =

Historic church in Wyoming, United States

- U.S. National Register of Historic Places
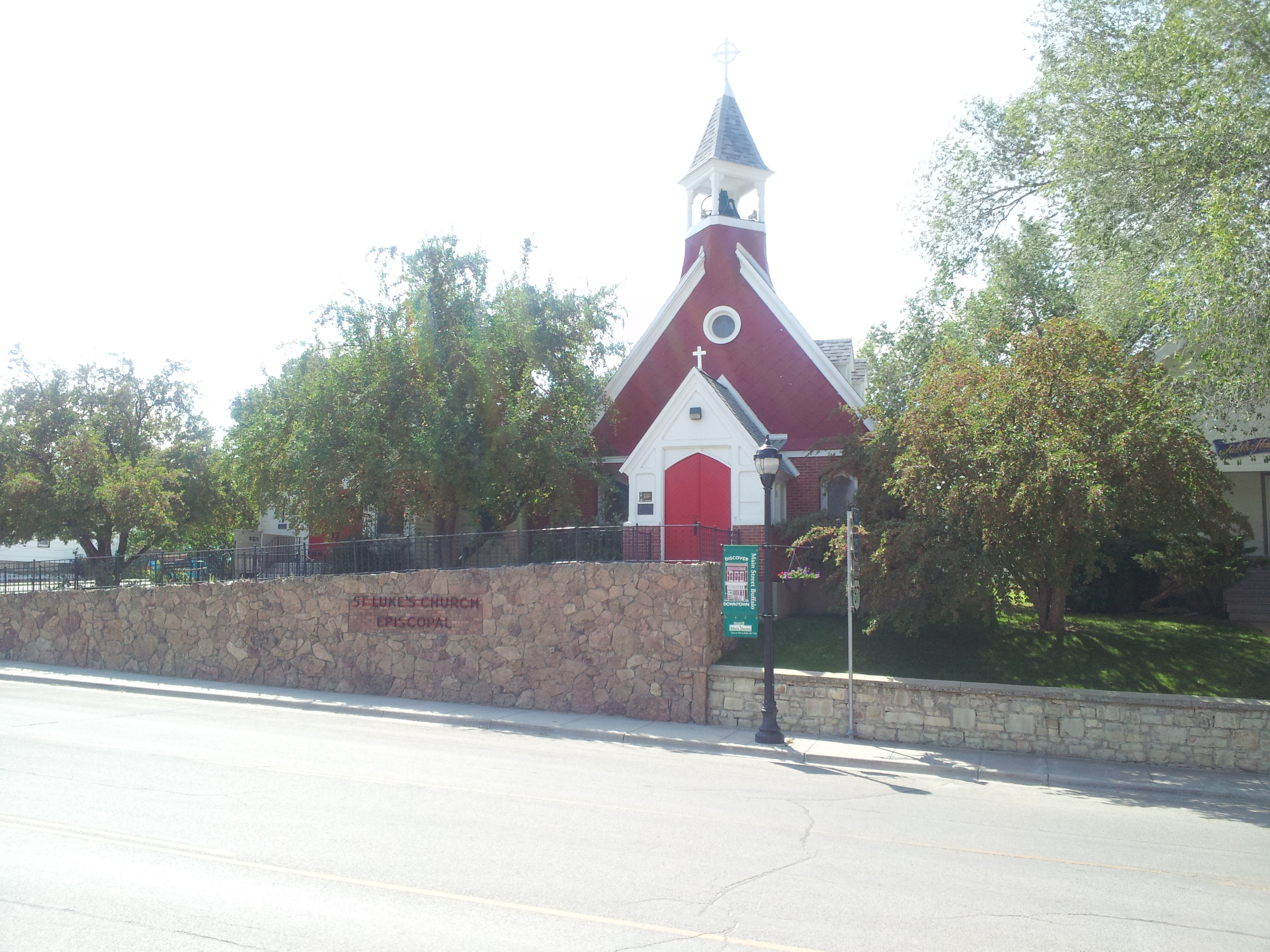

- Location within Wyoming Location within the United States
- Location: 178 S. Main, Buffalo, Wyoming
- Coordinates: 44°20′40″N 106°41′53″W
- Area: 0.3 acres (0.12 ha)
- Built: 1889
- Architect: Hutton, Thomas
- Architectural style: Gothic Revival
- NRHP reference No.: 76001953
- Added to NRHP: November 7, 1976

St. Luke's Episcopal Church is a historic church at 178 South Main Street in Buffalo, Wyoming, United States. It was built in 1889 and added to the National Register of Historic Places in 1976.

== Early days ==
St. Luke's Episcopal Church, as well as several other early Buffalo churches, had its beginning in the Sunday School which was held in the local schoolhouse in 1883. In 1884, Bishop John Spalding organized an Episcopal mission developed into the congregation. The first service was held in a private home in September 1884, and a group of wardens was chosen. Other services were held at the schoolhouse, and at a local hotel. Chaplain G.W. Simpson from Fort McKinney held services every Sunday at three o'clock. The first resident minister, Reverend F.C. Elred, served from 1887 to 1891.

== Church building ==
In 1888, the congregation decided to build a church on Main Street, and acquired several city lots. The deeds were recorded on October 31, 1888. The cornerstone was laid in 1889. A local woman described the new building:

"St. Luke's Church was built of red brick, the bricks made and burned in the brickyards of Curran Brothers. Thomas Hutton, an ardent churchman and artisan, built it. The style of St. Luke's is Gothic. People from far and wide have stopped while passing through to study the architecture. The furniture of the chancel, the altar, and hangings were given by the Vanderbilit family of New York. This is the history of the gift. As you know, the officers of Fort McKinney helped to start St. Luke's. A young man, a Lieutenant Webb, was related to the Vanderbilt family. He knew that he could get the financial aid to buy the chancel furnishings. He wrote to New York with splendid results. The massive beams in the ceiling of the church were hewn in the sawmill of Martin Woodard who had his mill in the forests of the Big Horns. They were brought down from the mountains over steep and rugged roads by 'Yorkie' Waters who had a large freighting outfit."

== History ==
During the Johnson County War, several important funerals took place at St. Luke's. When Deputy Marshall George A. Wellman was murdered by the “Taylor Gang”, known as the “Red Sashes”, the outlaws did not want the lawman to have the honor of a Christian funeral at St. Luke's. The outlaws, however, did not reckon with the courage and determination of The Rev. Charles Duell, members of St. Luke's and the Masons, all of whom carried concealed weapons during the funeral. The funeral took place on May 13, 1892.

In 1897, Dr. H.U. Onderdonk came to St. Luke's Parish as a lay reader. He studied for Holy Orders, and was ordained in 1900. Dr. Onderdonk served not only as physician and a clergyman, but also as a chemist, mathematician, nurse, and editor. The church hall, built in 1925, is named "Onderdonk Hall" in his memory."

On March 19, 1919, St. Luke's Church became a self-supporting regular parish. The church building is basically the same as it was when completed in 1889. Care has been taken to retain its basic design while maintaining it in excellent condition. It was listed on the National Register of Historic Places in 1976. Services are held every Sunday.
