= Powder River Station-Powder River Crossing =

- Powder River Station--Powder River Crossing (48JO134 and 48JO801)
- U.S. National Register of Historic Places
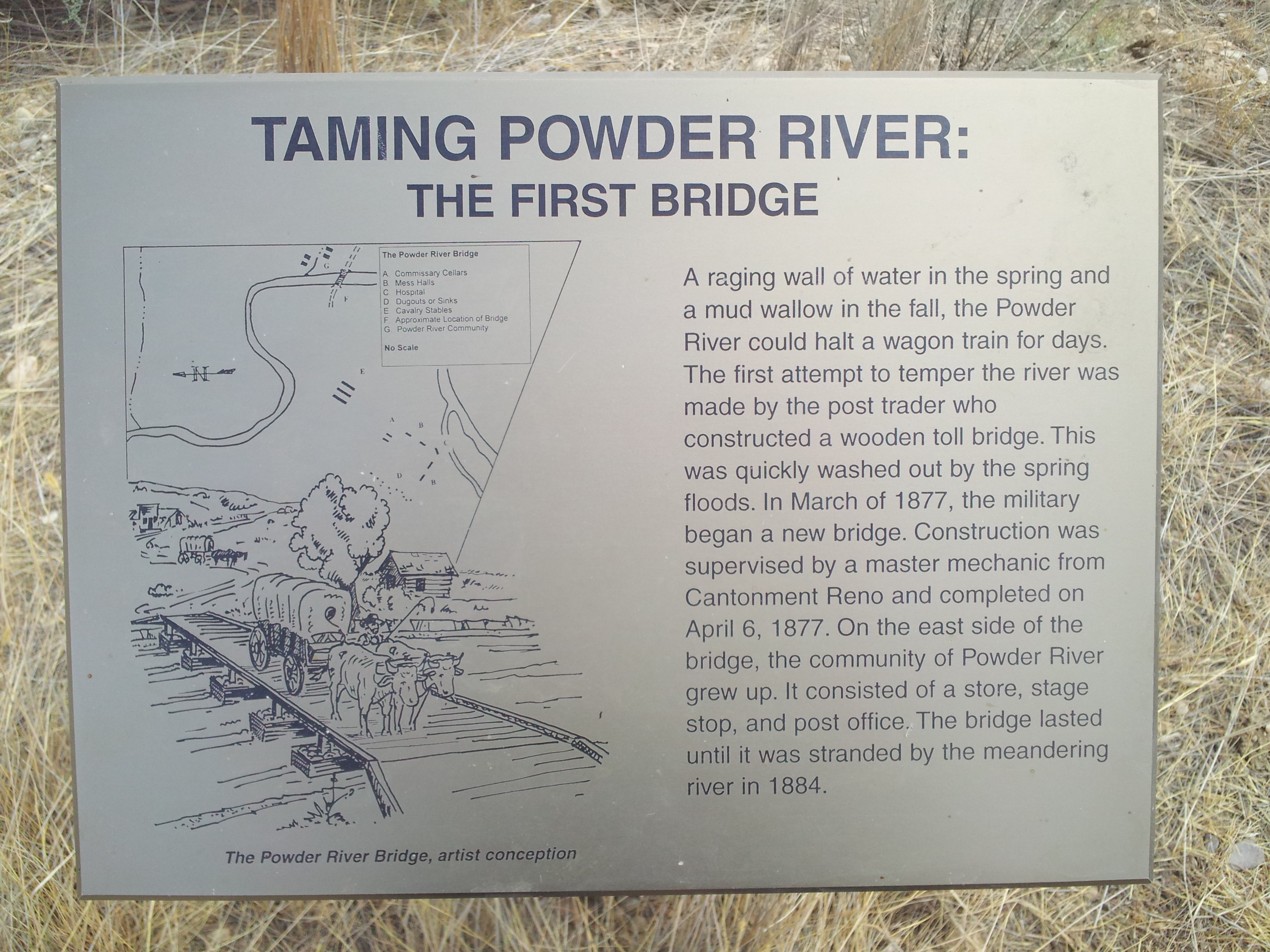
- BLM Sign near Powder River Crossing

- Location within Wyoming Location within the United States
- Location: Johnson County, East of Sussex on east side of Powder River, north side of Dry Fork
- Nearest city: Sussex, Wyoming
- Coordinates: 43°47′22.4052″N 106°14′48.8292″W
- Area: 215 acres (87 ha)
- Built: 1879
- Architectural style: Stage station
- MPS: Bozeman Trail in Wyoming MPS
- NRHP reference No.: 89000810
- Added to NRHP: July 23, 1989

The Powder River Crossing, officially known as Powder River Station-Powder River Crossing (48JO134 and 48JO801), is an abandoned settlement located on the east bank of the Powder River in southeast Johnson County about twenty-four miles east of Kaycee, Wyoming. It developed after a wooden toll bridge was built across the Powder River in 1877, at a site that was originally used as a ford. With crossing secured, a settlement developed here in the late 19th century, incorporating a stage stop on the Bozeman Trail. The site is notable for having well-preserved wagon ruts from the pioneer era.

== Cantonment Reno ==
Powder River Crossing was a civilian settlement that grew up on the Bozeman Trail, across the Powder River from Cantonment Reno. Cantonment Reno was established in late 1876, three miles upstream from the site of Fort Reno, a fort that was established in 1865 and abandoned in 1868 under the terms of the Fort Laramie Treaty of 1868.

By 1878, Cantonment Reno was experiencing a shortage of lumber, forage and water. The army decided to relocate the fort to Fort McKinney, about 45 miles northwest near the present-day site of Buffalo, Wyoming. By the end of 1878, all the soldiers were gone except for a small detail who looked after the abandoned buildings and ran the telegraph station.

== Stage Stop ==
The army built a military road and telegraph line along the Bozeman Trail in 1877 and 1878. Soldiers from Cantonment Reno completed a wooden bridge at the Powder River Crossing on April 6, 1877.

In April 1979, the Patrick Brothers Stage Line began thrice weekly regular service between Fort Fetterman and Etchetah, Montana on the Bozeman Trail. Powder River Crossing was the fifth stage stop after Fort Fetterman. On May 13, 1879, the army allowed the old sutler's store and one of the cavalry stables from Cantonment Reno to be used as a store and eating house at Powder River Crossing. An English traveler stayed at the store on August 30, 1880, and left a description:

"This is a deserted Fort....The log huts, built in a large square, are still standing. Frewen's store is in one of them, and there are two or three bedrooms there, rather rough and ready, one of which I secured....I was very tired towards night, and turned in early-no sheets-only a pair of blankets to get between, but I was soon asleep notwithstanding."

In January 1880, the Rock Creek Stage Company moved another log cavalry stable from the old cantonment to a point east of the Powder River along the Dry Fork. They also built several other buildings including a new stage stop. The stage station was eventually made up of a large, long building (store, saloon, and living quarters in one) along with stables, a blacksmith shop, and numerous old dugout cabins. The amenities included fresh horses, tobacco, whiskey, and prostitutes. From 1882 to 1891, William P. Hathaway ran the store and saloon which was located directly east of the dry gulch at the end of the little patch of timber."

Amanda and Horace Brown ran the stage stop at Powder River Crossing from 1884 until 1887. Her memoirs appeared in the October 1958 issue of Colorado Magazine:

"We made good money, but I sure worked myself down. I cooked for all the way from ten to forty people, did all my washing, cleaned the rooms, and waited on people. We kept the stage people. I always had to be ready for a stage full, and sometimes it was only the drivers. There were all the different people which make up a new country traveling on the road - ranchmen, cowboys, gamblers, horse thieves, and occasionally stage robbers."

According to Brown, a small community grew up around the stage station, and the iron bridge that was built in 1883. There were never more than four families at Powder River Crossing, but the amenities includes a store, a post office, and a saloon. When the Burlington Railroad reached Clearmont, Wyoming in 1892, the stage line was no longer needed.

== Abandonment ==
The post office at Powder River was established on May 22, 1879 with John Livingston as the first postmaster. In 1881, Henry Winter ("Hard Winter") Davis, established the Spectacle Ranch near the present site of Sussex, Wyoming. The post office at Powder River Crossing moved to the Davis ranch on October 18, 1895. The road that ran down the Dry Fork was rerouted to cross the Powder River at Sussex, and it eventually became Wyoming Highway 192. In 1914, a new bridge and post office were built at Sussex (Sussex Post Office and Store), and this spelled the end of Powder River Crossing.

== Present Status ==
The area at Powder River Crossing was never homesteaded, and it is owned by the Wyoming Office of State Lands and Investments, an agency of the State of Wyoming. There is a wide dispersal of wagon ruts from the Bozeman Trail near the mouth of the Dry Fork tributary. Near the ruts, marked by a grove of cottonwood trees, is the former location of the Powder River Station and the eating establishment run by Horace Brown.
