= John Nihill =

United States Army Medal of Honor recipient (1850–1908)

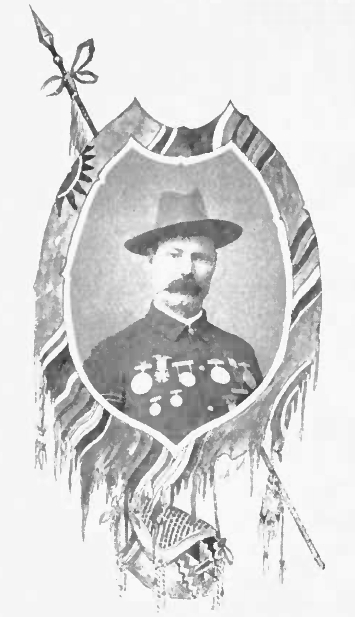
- John Nihill
- Born: May 25, 1850; Nenagh, Ireland
- Died: May 29, 1908 (aged 58); Whitestone, New York, United States
- Burial place: Cypress Hills National Cemetery
- Military career
- Allegiance: United States of America; Union
- Branch: United States Army; Union Army
- Service years: 1868–c. 1895
- Rank: Sergeant
- Unit: 5th U.S. Cavalry
- Conflicts: American Civil War; Indian Wars; Apache Wars; Great Sioux War of 1876–77
- Awards: Medal of Honor; Division of Missouri, silver medal; Department of the East, skirmish medal; Division of the Atlantic, silver medal; Distinguished Marksman Medal; Sharpshooter's Silver Cross; Marksman's Pin

John Nihill (May 25, 1850 – May 29, 1908) was an Irish-born soldier in the U.S. Army who served with the 5th U.S. Cavalry during the Indian Wars. A participant in the Apache Wars, he received the Medal of Honor for bravery when he single-handedly fought off four Apache warriors in the Whetstone Mountains of Arizona on July 13, 1872. At the time of his death, he was the only enlisted man to be admitted as a member of the Military Order of the Loyal Legion of the United States.

A well-known Indian fighter during his lifetime, Nihill was close friends with William F. "Buffalo Bill" Cody and Captain Jack Crawford. He was also considered at one time to be one of the top marksmen in the United States armed services. By 1885, he had won every shooting award offered by the US military and was barred from accepting awards at further competitions.

== Biography ==
=== Early life and military career ===
John Nihill was born in Nenagh, Ireland, on May 25, 1850. He ran away from home at an early age and eventually made his way to the United States. Shortly after his arrival in Brooklyn, New York, he enlisted in the U.S. Army on November 10, 1868, and was assigned to the 5th U.S. Cavalry. He spent the next 15 years of his career with this regiment serving under such officers as William H. Emory, Wesley Merritt and Eugene A. Carr during the Indian Wars against the Plains Indians throughout the American frontier "as far east as Kansas, to Arizona in the west, and south from the Yellowstone Park to the Rio Grande". Two years later, Nihill took part in Carr's Republican River expedition, which included William F. "Buffalo Bill" Cody as a guide and scout, and saw action at the Battle of Summit Springs on July 11, 1869. He also participated in similar campaigns at the Solomon River in Kansas, and at Red Willow and Budwood Creeks in Nebraska between 1869 and 1871. He followed Carr to the Arizona Territory in late-1871 where the 5th Cavalry battled the Apache for the next four years. It was during this time that he became close friends with William Cody and Captain Jack Crawford.

=== Battle of the Whetstone Mountains ===
On July 13, 1872, Nihill was part of an 8-man cavalry detachment under the command of Second Lieutenant William P. Hall sent out from Camp Crittenden to stop an Apache raiding party which had stolen cattle from a local Mexican rancher. They pursued the Apaches 15 miles into a canyon in the Whetstone Mountains. Though they had expected a dozen or so Indians, they instead encountered about 80 Apache braves. His commander hoped to surprise the hostiles, gaining an advantage by firing the first volley, but their presence was detected by the Apache and they charged towards the soldiers. Other Indians pushed boulders from the top of cliffs as high as 800 feet wounding several cavalrymen and horses. After a brief fight, the outnumbered troopers were forced to retreat. Nihill was unaware of this, being engaged in a shooting match with another Apache hiding behind a nearby rock, and became separated from the main group. While fighting his way back to his unit, Nihill assisted Private Michael Glynn and First Sergeant Henry Newman by holding off the Apaches while the wounded troopers could be safely evacuated.

According to an 1895 article by The New York Times, he later found Glynn, whose horse had been killed and was shot in both shoulders. Nihill put Glynn on his own horse and sent him to a forest a few miles away. He told Glynn that he would hold off the Apaches for as long as he could and, if he survived, would rejoin his comrade in the same woods. After Glynn galloped off, Nihill followed behind on foot towards the woods. He was soon spotted by a small group of Apaches, however, and forced to take cover behind a large rock. Nihill killed each Apache that approached him and, after running out of ammunition, kept the others at bay by feigning to reload his gun. He was unaware of how many Apache he faced until they finally retreated. Nihill then proceeded to the woods, where he found Glynn still waiting for him. The wounded soldier was lying on the ground next to the horse, too weak to sit in the saddle, and Nihill strapped him to the mount, then rode the horse back to Camp Crittenden nearly 50 miles away. His commanding officer, Colonel Westley Merritt, recommended Nihill for the Medal of Honor, which he received on December 4, 1874, as did Glynn and Newman. He later received a certificate of merit from Secretary of War Robert Lincoln. He participated in other actions against the Apache including Davidson Canyon in September 1872, Hawk Canyon, Pinal Creek and the Pinal Mountains in March 1874, and Slim Buttes in the Dakota Territory in September 1876.

=== Sharpshooting competitor and later years ===
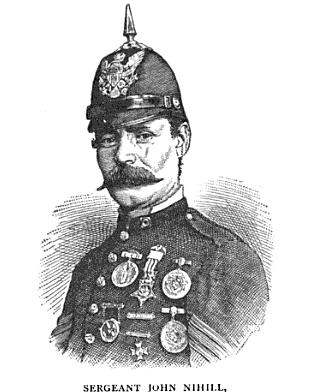
Sketch of Sergeant John Nihill

During the 1880s, Nihill became an accomplished marksman and established himself as one of the top "crack shots" in the United States military. In 1882, Nihill won a spot on the Department of the Platte Rifle Team, as well as a medal with the Division of the Mississippi Rifle Team. This medal was the first one ever awarded to a member of the 5th U.S. Cavalry for marksmanship. He took the Division of the Missouri's silver medal at Fort Leavenworth on September 27, 1882. After his term of enlistment expired the following year at Fort McKinney in Wyoming, Nihill reenlisted with Battery B of the 5th U.S. Artillery at Fort Wadsworth. He continued to win shooting awards during the next few years including those from the Department of the East Skirmish and the first Silver Medal of the Atlantic in 1885. He also won his regiment's battery medal three years in a row from 1884 to 1886. Nihill won so many medals that he was eventually barred from competing for army medals, being permitted to shoot in contests, but not eligible to accept awards. During President Chester A. Arthur's 1885 visit to Yellowstone National Park, Nihill accompanied Authur's party as a hunter and "kept them well supplied with fresh meat". He was placed on the list of distinguished marksmen two years later and, in 1888, won a place on the Army Team defeating the winner of the first prize, Division of the Atlantic, by 17 points.

After four years at Fort Wadsworth, he transferred to the 4th U.S. Cavalry at Fort Myer, Virginia. When his enlistment term ended in 1888, he once again reenlisted and joined Company A of the Battalion of Engineers in Washington, DC. He continued to participate in shooting competitions, often making clean scores at 200 to 1,000 yards, and made 19 consecutive bullseyes in one contest in the fall of 1894. His final shot missed the bullseye by less than half an inch. In March 1895, an illustrated biography of Nihill's life and military career was featured in a Sunday edition of The New York Times. The story was later republished in his native Ireland where it was read by his parents. This was the first they had heard from their son since running away from home nearly 30 years before. His mother wrote a letter to the editor of The New York Times which was later forwarded to Nihill.

Following Nihill's retirement from the military, he returned to New York and lived in Whitestone, Long Island until his death on May 29, 1908, only four days after his 58th birthday. Accompanied by an escort of troops from Fort Totten, he was buried with full military honors at Cypress Hills National Cemetery in Brooklyn, New York.

== Medal of Honor citation ==
Rank and organization: Private, Company F, 5th U.S. Cavalry. Place and date: At Whetstone Mountains, Ariz., 13 July 1872. Entered service at: Brooklyn, N.Y. Born: 1850, Ireland. Date of issue: 4 December 1874.

Citation:

Fought and defeated 4 hostile Apaches located between him and his comrades.

== See also ==
- List of Medal of Honor recipients for the Indian Wars
- Fort McKinney (Wyoming)
