= Lake Desmet Segment, Bozeman Trail =

- U.S. National Register of Historic Places
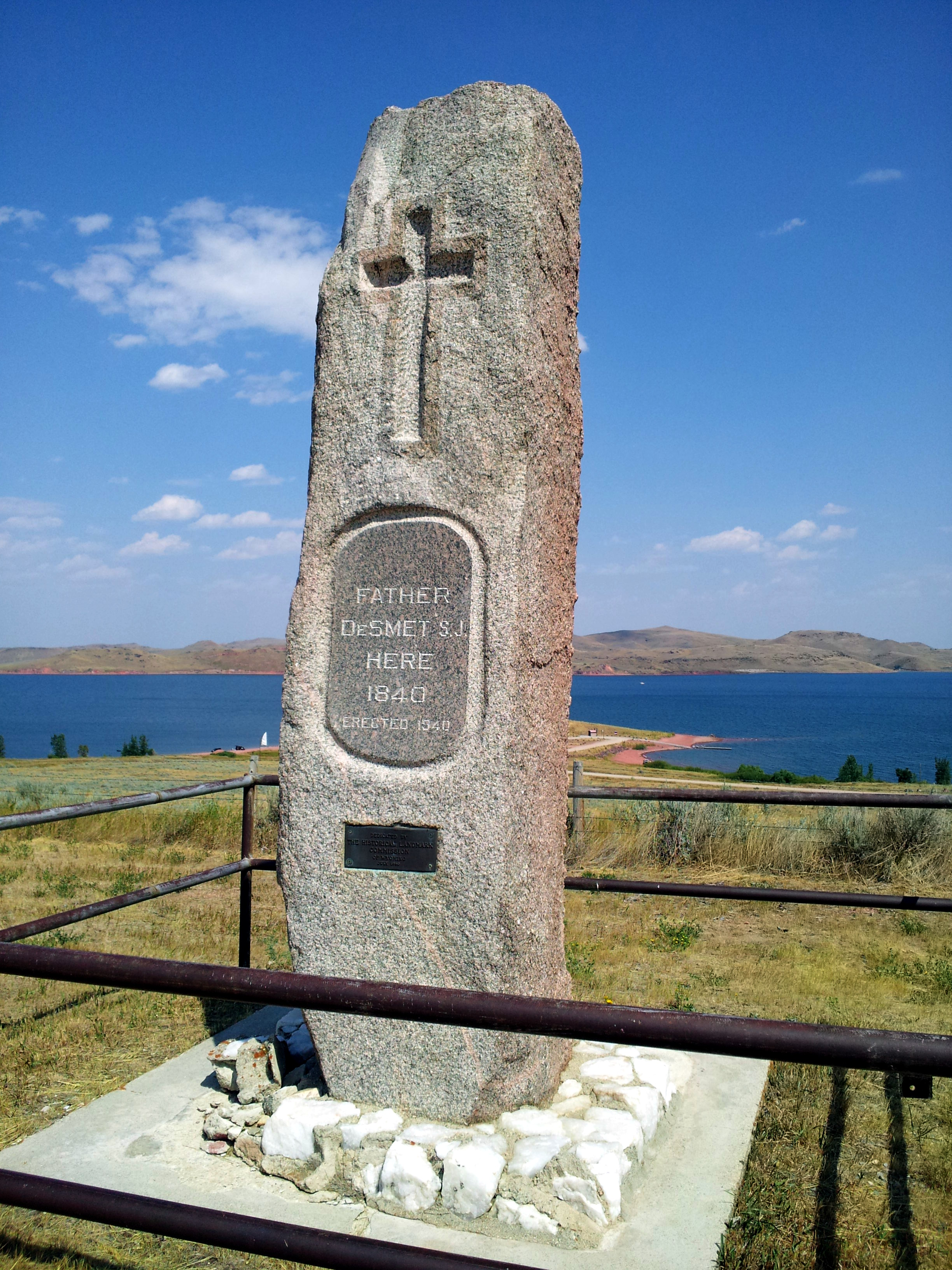
- Nearest city: Buffalo, Wyoming
- Area: 258 acres (104 ha)
- MPS: Bozeman Trail in Wyoming MPS
- NRHP reference No.: 89000814
- Added to NRHP: July 23, 1989

The Lake Desmet Segment is a one-mile long set of trail ruts that are a well-preserved portion of the Bozeman Trail in Johnson County, Wyoming. The ruts are located about a mile west of Lake Desmet on the down slope of the hill overlooking the lake. This portion of the trail is on private property, so permission is required to visit.

== Lake De Smet ==
Lake De Smet occupies a natural undrained basin on the divide between Piney Creek, and one of its tributaries, Boxelder Creek. It is one of several basins in the Buffalo area that were formed by coal seam fires. After the coal deposits burned, the clinker and other sediments collapsed into the space vacated by the burned coal forming a natural basin.

In the early years, Lake De Smet was a highly saline lake capable of supporting only limited types of aquatic life. However, during a period of higher precipitation from 1880 to 1915 the salinity of the lake dropped because of additional runoff from local creeks. In 1917, Levi Leiter a Chicago millionaire built an irrigation ditch from Piney Creek to Lake Desmet, and impounded additional water with a small dam. In 1957, Reynolds Mining bought the lake, replaced the ditch with a tunnel and replaced the dam with a higher dam. In 1976, Texaco bought Lake De Smet from Reynolds Mining and they raised the dam again. The original natural lake was about 1500 acres in size, but the various dams have increased the size of the lake to about 3600 acres today.

== History ==
Lake De Smet was first described by Pierre-Jean De Smet, a Jesuit priest who was a missionary to Native American people. He described the lake in a letter dated August 24, 1851:

"On the 23rd we left Tongue River. For ten hours we marched over mountain and valley, following the course of one of its tributaries, making, however, only about twenty-five miles. On the day following we crossed a chain of lofty mountains to attain the Lower Piney Fork, nearly twenty miles distant. We arrived quite unexpectedly on the borders of a lovely little lake about six miles long, and my traveling companions gave it my name. There our hunters killed several wild ducks."

In 1865, the Powder River Expedition passed Lake Desmet during their military operations against the Sioux Indians. One of the officers, Captain Henry E. Palmer described the lake:

"Seven miles from Clear Fork, we came to a very pretty lake about two miles long and about three-fourths of a mile wide, which Major Bridger (Jim Bridger) told us was De Smet Lake, named after Father De Smet. The Lake is strongly impregnated with alkali, in fact, so strong that an egg or potato will not sink if thrown into the water. Large, red bluffs are to be seen on both sides and underneath the lake is an immense coal vein."

The Bozeman Trail which was active from 1863 to 1868 passed about a mile west of Lake De Smet along the length of the lake. About a half dozen emigrant diaries mention the lake, and some of the travelers mistakenly called it Smith or Smith's Lake.

Over the years, Lake De Smet has been alleged to be inhabited by a sea monster. These legends and recent sightings have persisted to the present day.

Although Father De Smet spelled his name differently, the preferred spelling of the name of the lake is Lake Desmet.
