= Jameson Site =

- U.S. National Register of Historic Places
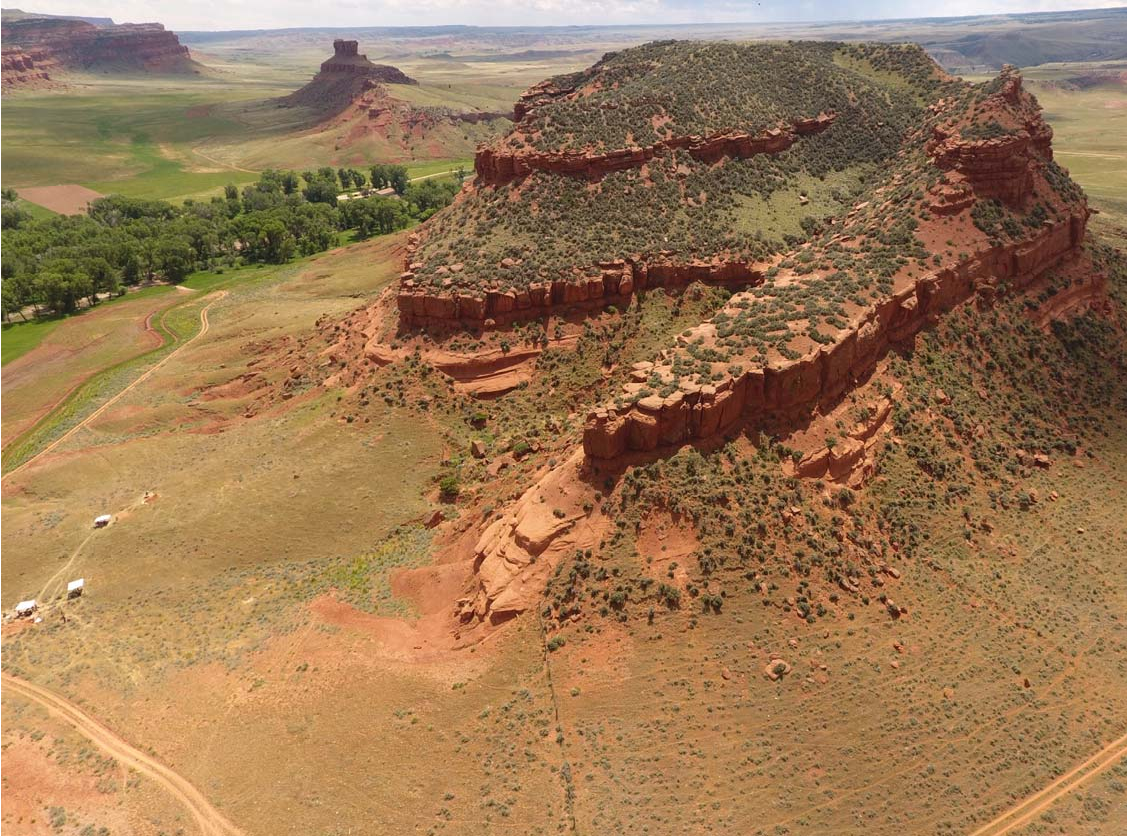
- Nearest city: Barnum, Wyoming
- NRHP reference No.: 100002942
- Added to NRHP: September 13, 2018

The Jameson Site in Johnson County, Wyoming is an archeological site which was listed on the National Register of Historic Places in 2018.

It includes Late Plains Archaic period artifacts.

It is located next to the Castle Rock butte in the Hole in the Wall area. The site was investigated by University of Wyoming master's student John Jameson in 1975, and was further investigated in 2015.
