= Beaver Creek Ranch Headquarters =

- U.S. National Register of Historic Places
- Location within Wyoming Location within the United States
- Location: 2333 Beaver Creek, near Buffalo, Wyoming
- Coordinates: 44.099315°N 106.049834°W
- Area: 10.3 acres (4.2 ha)
- NRHP reference No.: 13001064
- Added to NRHP: January 8, 2014

The Beaver Creek Ranch Headquarters, in the vicinity of Buffalo in the Powder River Basin in Johnson County, Wyoming, was listed on the National Register of Historic Places in 2014. The ranch has been known as Schoonover Ranch, as Harriet Ranch, and as Iberlin Ranch.

The ranch headquarters was then vacant, not in use, and the listing included 10.3 acres (4.2 ha) with eight contributing buildings, one contributing structure, and two non-contributing structures.

Per the NRHP registration, the ranch was deemed notable

as a rare and well-preserved example of a twentieth-century western sheep ranching operation in Wyoming as it evolved in the Powder River Basin. The ranch represents traditional Spanish sheep management practices that developed in Wyoming, rather than the English system utilized in the early Atlantic colonies. In Wyoming, large herds of sheep were grazed by individual herders across the public domain rather than in fenced pastures. Because of its proximity to the Bighorn Mountains, the practice of transhumance was incorporated into yearly sheep management. Flocks were trailed into the mountains during the summer months to take advantage of abundant water and forage. During the remainder of the year, herders and their flocks radiated out from Beaver Creek Ranch headquarters in all directions, grazing freely on the public domain, until the Taylor Grazing Act of 1934 required permits and grazing fees on public lands. After that date, sheep management practices became more orderly, and sheep were required to graze within predetermined boundaries on the public lands surrounding the ranch. The site is also associated with French Basque ethnic influences dating from 1951, when the ranch was acquired by the Harriet family, who were a part of the larger Basque community that developed around Buffalo in the early 1900s.

The ranch was bought by John Iberlin, who was also Basque, in 1994, and the ranch buildings were then not occupied, and were fenced off from grazing cattle.

== Other Beaver Creek Ranches ==
Google Maps shows a Beaver Creek Ranch on Napier Road in Gillette (is this the successor ranch headquarters?), at 44.074770°N 105.905043°W. Note there is at least one other Beaver Creek Ranch in Wyoming, in Weston County.
