= Union Congregational Church and Parsonage =

Historic church in Wyoming, United States

- U.S. National Register of Historic Places
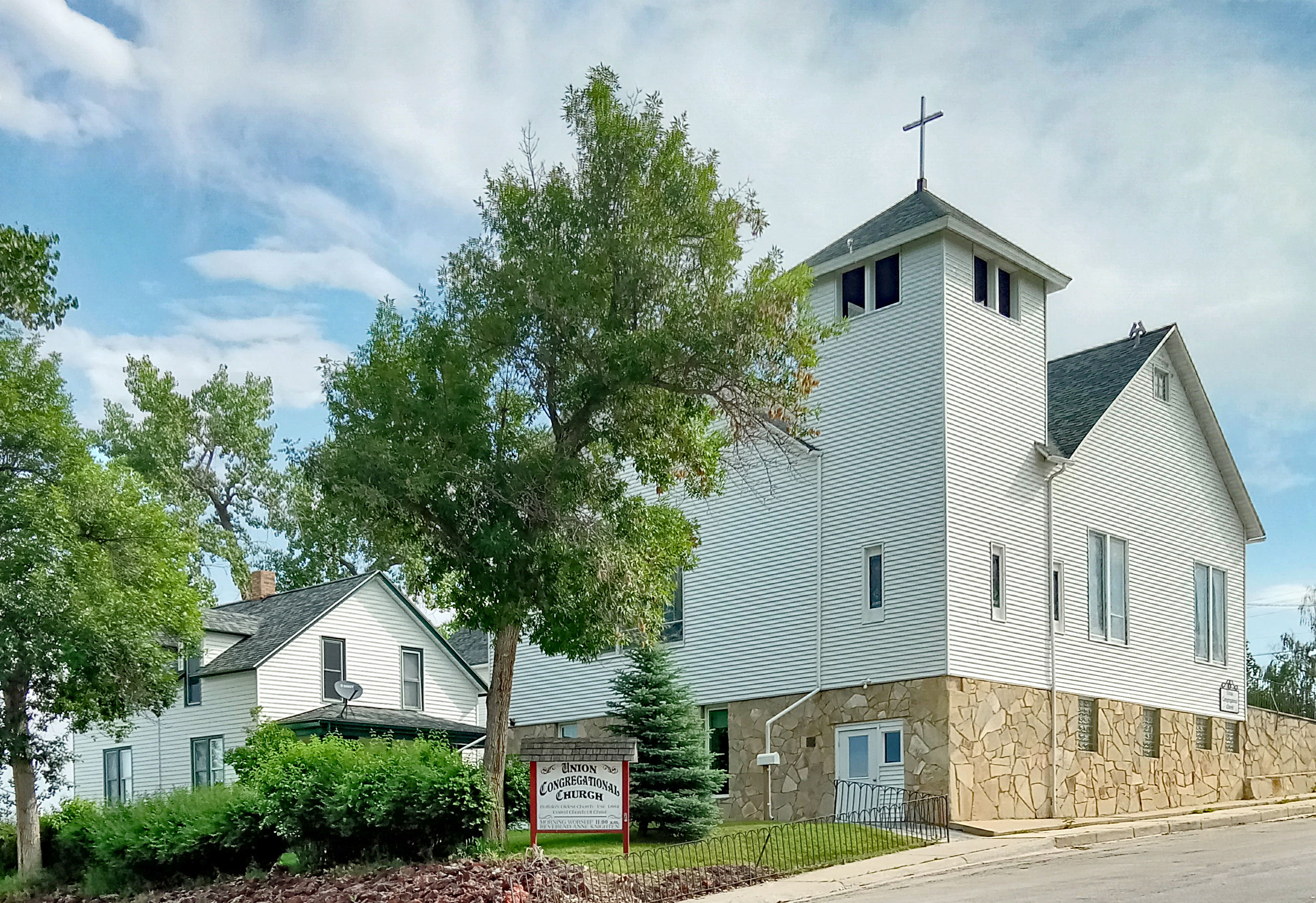
- Union Congregational Church and Parsonage from the southwest

- Location within Wyoming Location within the United States
- Location: 110 Bennett Street, Buffalo, Wyoming
- Coordinates: 44°20′42.5″N 106°41′46.5″W
- Area: less than one acre
- Built: 1886
- NRHP reference No.: 85000248
- Added to NRHP: February 7, 1985

Union Congregational Church and Parsonage, built in 1886, is a historic church in Buffalo, Wyoming, United States. It was the first church built in Buffalo, and one of the first two churches established in the northern part of the Wyoming Territory.

== Early history ==
In December 1883, the Reverend Addison Blanchard, superintendent of missions for the Colorado and Wyoming Congregational Church, visited Buffalo. He spent three weeks preaching, and visiting almost every family in town. He found that there were a few families who wanted to participate in a "union church" on the "simple basis of pure Christianity in which minor differences of opinion and forms should be tolerated...."

In February 1884, Buffalo's first resident pastor, Reverend George C. Rock of Philadelphia, arrived, and he preached during the next eight months. On October 13, 1884, Superintendent Blanchard organized the Union Congregational Church of Buffalo, with ten founding members. The congregation met for services in a log schoolhouse at what is now 138 North Main Street. Soon they purchased some land from Mrs. Juliet Hart and began to plan for their own building.

== Church building ==
The plans for the new church were drawn up by Thomas Hutton in 1885. Hutton was also hired to do the grading, build the foundation, and oversee the construction by the contractor, S. Sherrill. The church was built during the summer and fall of 1886, and was ready for occupancy on December 12, 1886. The cost of the building was $2469.87.

The National Register nomination includes a description of the building:

"Situated on the top of a steep hill, the church was a plain, gable-roofed, rectangular, frame structure about 26 x 29 feet, with the length running north south. The exterior finish was unusually narrow beveled siding (less than three inches weather exposure) which is preserved on the present church. On the south end of the building was an entry hall with a three-sided truncated hip roof. This entry ran the width of the building and was about 10 feet wide. There were two pairs of tall six-paned windows on the west, south, and east sides of the church, a main door on the south in the center of the entry hall/and a small belfry on the south end of the gable roof. The builders added some decoration in the exposed rafters which were carved and pierced and backed by a dentate-carved board, still visible today on the east side of the church.

== Expansion ==
The church building was expanded in 1911 and 1912. A basement was dug on the lower slope of the hill to the west, and the church building was moved onto the new basement. The basement was 14 feet wider than the sanctuary, so it was possible to add another 14 feet to the room above. The gable roof over the addition runs west from the north–south alignment of the original roof. The north–south gable roof was extended to cover the entry hall, and the door to the building was moved to the east end of the entry hall. The two gables formed an angle where a belfry tower was built to a height of about two feet above the roofs. The square tower provides an entry to the basement, and a stairway to the church above. The basement, which opens out to the west, has space for meetings and social activities along with Sunday School classes.

In 1913, the stained glass windows were added to the sanctuary. A fire in 1922 damaged the interior of the first floor, and destroyed the large stained glass window on the west side of the sanctuary. All of the other windows are original. Two other rooms were added north of the sanctuary in 1938 and 1958. In 1974, the exterior of the basement walls were faced with sandstone flagstones from an outcrop about 60 miles (100 km) southwest of Buffalo.

== Parsonage ==
The parsonage, built in 1910, is built on a level with the west side of the basement of the church. It is a frame structure with a gable roof and tall paired windows. There is a shed-like roof on the south side of the parsonage. Originally, it must have looked like a small replica of the church.
