= Cantonment Reno =

- U.S. National Register of Historic Places
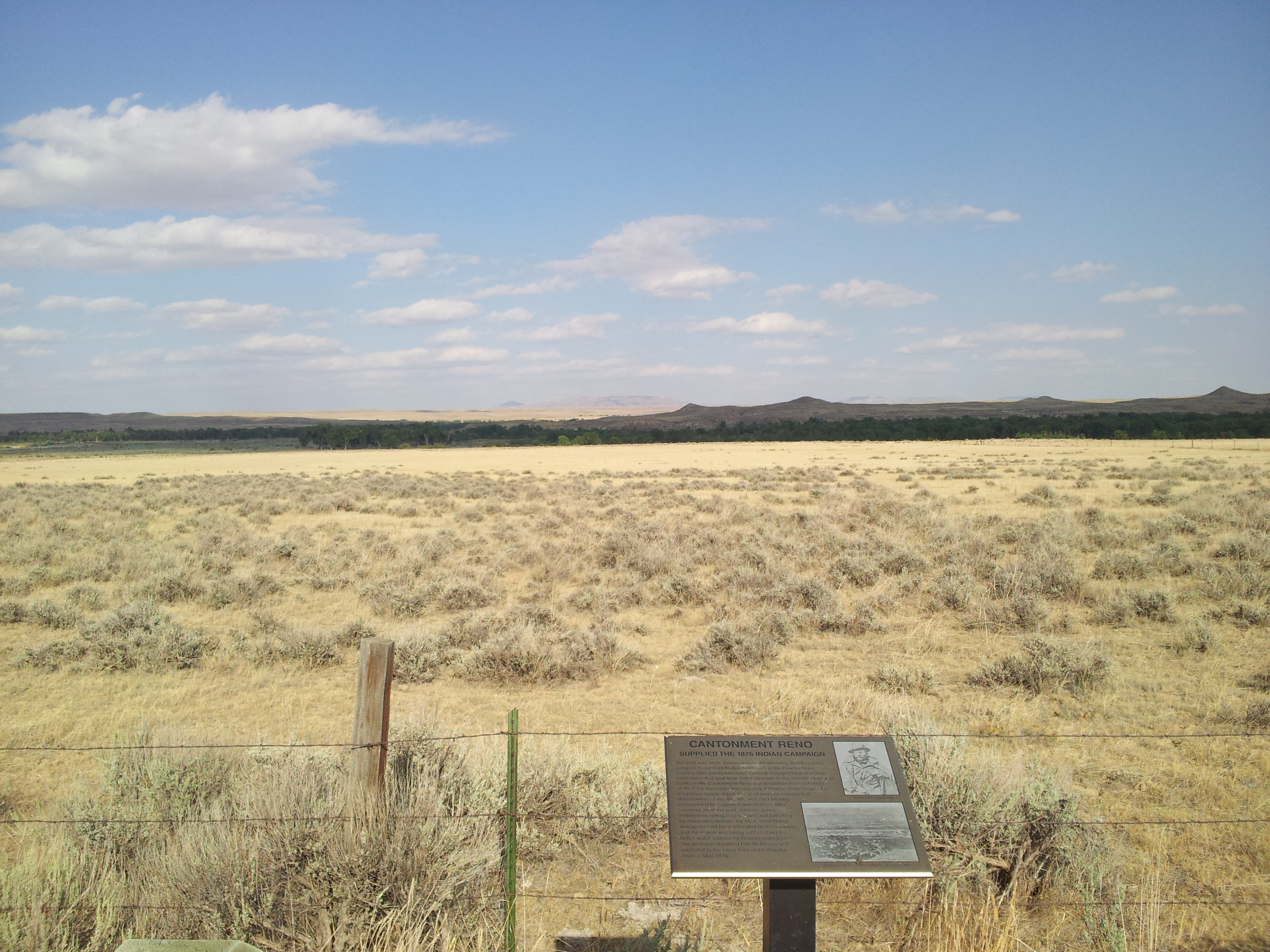
- Site of Cantonment Reno on Sussex Road

- Location within Wyoming Location within the United States
- Location: Johnson County, East of Sussex on west side of Powder River
- Nearest city: Sussex, Wyoming
- Coordinates: 43°47′10.914″N 106°15′16.092″W
- Area: 640 acres (260 ha)
- Built: 1877
- Built by: US Army
- Architectural style: Fort
- NRHP reference No.: 77001382
- Added to NRHP: July 29, 1977

Cantonment Reno also known as Fort McKinney 1 was a US Army post or cantonment located on the Powder River near the old Bozeman Trail crossing. A previous fort near the site (Fort Reno) had been abandoned and burned after the Fort Laramie Treaty of 1868. Cantonment Reno was re-established in late 1876, just upstream of the site of old Fort Reno. Cantonment Reno started as a temporary base of operations for General George Crooks' 1876 Big Horn Expedition,. Crook's Expedition was part of the intensive campaign against the Sioux and Cheyenne in late 1876, following Custer's defeat at the Battle of the Little Bighorn.

== Construction ==
The construction of the cantonment began on October 14, 1876, and work was completed on December 19, 1876. The total cost of materials (doors, windows, hardware and lumber) was $931.91. US Army troops did most of the work, but civilian employees received an additional $170.00 in wages. The structures included a storehouse, two storage cellars, barracks (19 huts), a hospital, a mess room and kitchen, nine officers huts, a shed, a corral, teamster's hut, a blacksmith's shop, and a bakery for a total of forty-two structures. A wooden bridge was built across the river in March and April 1877.

One of the cantonment's surgeons left a description of the hospital: "The hospital at this station is one log hut, 14 x 16 feet, occupied as a ward and dispensary, having a dirt floor and covered with dirt. The height of the roof from the floor inside is 9 feet on one side and 10 feet on the other, giving one foot slope to it; this room has five small windows and one door, and is heated when necessary by one stove."

== Fort McKinney 1 ==
On November 25, 1876, part of Crook's command, under the leadership of Col. Ranald S. Mackenzie, attacked a village of Cheyenne ("Dull Knife's village") on the nearby Red Fork of the Powder River. The army surprised and scattered the Cheyennes driving men, women and children out of their village into subzero temperatures and snow on the open prairie. The battle is known as the Dull Knife Fight or the Battle of Bates Creek. Cantonment Reno provided logistic support for the attack, and rudimentary care for the army wounded from the battle. Lieutenant John A. McKinney was one of the 25 American soldiers killed in the Dull Knife Fight.

In May 1877, elements of the Fifth Cavalry established a camp on Clear Creek, near present-day Buffalo, Wyoming. On June 16, 1877, the officer in charge of the camp named it "Camp McKinney", in honor of the officer who was killed in the Dull Knife Fight. However, since this was only a temporary camp, no one at headquarters recognized the name. However, this camp developed into Fort McKinney (Wyoming) also known as Fort McKinney 2, the fort near Buffalo.

At about the same time, the commander of Cantonment Reno asked his superiors that his Cantonment be renamed "Cantonment or Camp McKinney." This was because mail for Cantonment Reno was being mixed up with mail directed to Fort Reno (Oklahoma). On August 30, 1877, the War Department officially renamed Cantonment Reno as Fort McKinney. This duplication of names has led to endless confusion over the years between Fort McKinney 1 (Cantonment Reno) and Fort McKinney 2, Fort McKinney (Wyoming).

== Abandonment ==
By 1878, Cantonment Reno was experiencing lumber, forage and water shortages. After considerable study a decision was made to relocate the post to the new Fort McKinney, 45 miles northwest, to a site on the Clear Fork of the Powder River. The new site of Fort McKinney was on benchlands just north of the Clear Fork, about two miles west of present-day Buffalo, Wyoming.

By the end of 1878, the Army had vacated Cantonment Reno/Fort McKinney 1. Only a small detail of soldiers remained to take care of the depot and repair the telegraph line. Doors, window sashes, and hardware were stripped from the cantonment to supply the new post on Clear Fork, leaving the hulls of post buildings. On December 10, 1878, Major Verling K. Hart, commander at the new Fort McKinney, recommended that a section of land at the old post be retained as a campground, so the land at Cantonment Reno remains publicly owned.

== Powder River Crossing ==
On May 13, 1879, the commander of Fort McKinney allowed a "Mr. Freron" to open a store and eating house (but not a bar) in the abandoned sutler's store at Cantonment Reno. "Mr. Freron" was Moreton Frewen, an English rancher in the Powder River country. The three-man caretaker detail at the cantonment was withdrawn in late 1879, and civilians took over the telegraph operation. In January 1880, the Rock River Stage Company received permission to move one of the log stables across the Powder River. This was the beginning of the settlement known as Powder River Crossing.

== Current status ==
The Cantonment Reno site is one square mile in size. Its boundary lines are the historic boundary lines of the McKinney Military Reservation, which coincides to some extent with Section 17, T44N, R78W. The site is located on County Road 76, five miles north of the intersection with Wyoming Highway 192, about twenty miles east of Kaycee, Wyoming. Today no structures remain of the cantonment, but shallow depressions in the ground are evidence of their former existence. Removal of structures and artifacts is a part of the history of Cantonment Reno. Scattered widely throughout the site are fragments of metal, wood and glass, reminders of what once could be found at the depot. An instance of wholesale removal of artifacts from this historic site occurred as late as 1962. The site is administered by the Bureau of Land Management.
