= Johnson County Courthouse (Wyoming) =

- U.S. National Register of Historic Places
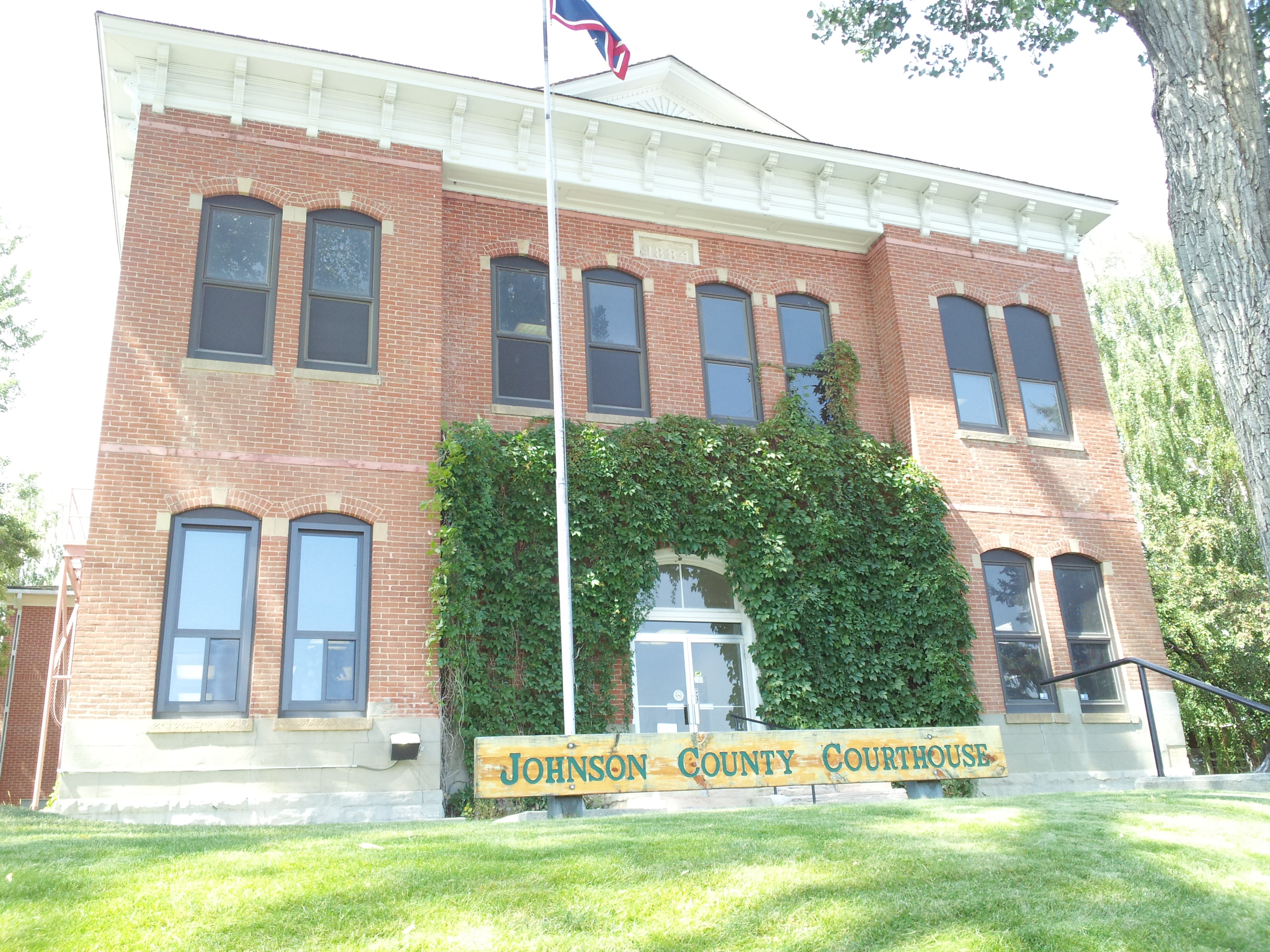
- Johnson County Courthouse

- Location within Wyoming Location within the United States
- Location: Buffalo, Wyoming
- Coordinates: 44°20′52″N 106°41′56″W
- Built: 1884
- Built by: Edward & James Curran
- Architectural style: Italianate
- NRHP reference No.: 76001951
- Added to NRHP: November 7, 1976

The Johnson County Courthouse in Buffalo, Wyoming was built in 1884. The Italianate style building adjoins the former Johnson County Library, which is also listed on the National Register of Historic Places.

== Construction ==
On April 19, 1881, Wyoming Territorial governor John Wesley Hoyt appointed two Johnson County residents as the first county commissioners of Johnson County. They organized the first county election on April 27, 1881. On June 27, 1881, the newly elected commissioners met, and purchased the Lone Star Dance Hall and stables to be used as offices for the county.

By November 1883, it was apparent that the former dance hall was not a secure place for the county's records, and that the condition of the building was such that repairs would not be practical. The commissioners felt that Johnson County needed a new facility for its records, courtrooms, and prisoners. The commissioners requested bids on April 30, 1884, and reviewed the bids on June 8, 1884. The low bid of $81,650 from Edward and James Curran was accepted, and they were awarded the contract.

== Architecture ==
The Johnson County Courthouse is a good example of the Italianate style of architecture. The stilted arch window openings with pronounced keystones and the consoles on cornices are characteristics of this style. Bricks for the courthouse were made from clay soil mined from a location just south of the Buffalo City Park. Kilns at the foot of the Big Horn Mountains provided the lime for the mortar.

The structure has changed little since it was built in 1884, except for the removal of the bell tower. The courthouse is two stories high, built of red brick, and is situated above street level. A border of white was painted under the eaves, and an emblem of the rising sun occupies the space high above main doorway facing east. The door way is recessed.

In the early days, heat was provided by wood and coal stoves. A steam heating system was installed, and at that time the bricks of the foundation were cemented over, and a chimney on the north side was removed. At one time, a hallway led to a door on the south side. However, a vault was needed for storage so the door was closed off and the vault constructed where the hallway had been. The courtroom was remodelled after World War II. More recent remodelling in 1973-1974 included an enclosed counter on the main floor hallway. The jail has been moved to a separate structure. The long twin stairways, one on each end of the main hall, have not been modified. These curving wood stairways with their ornamental stringers are in excellent condition. There is also wood panelling in the main hallway which is distinctive.
