= Jim Gatchell Memorial Museum =

- Carnegie Public Library
- U.S. National Register of Historic Places
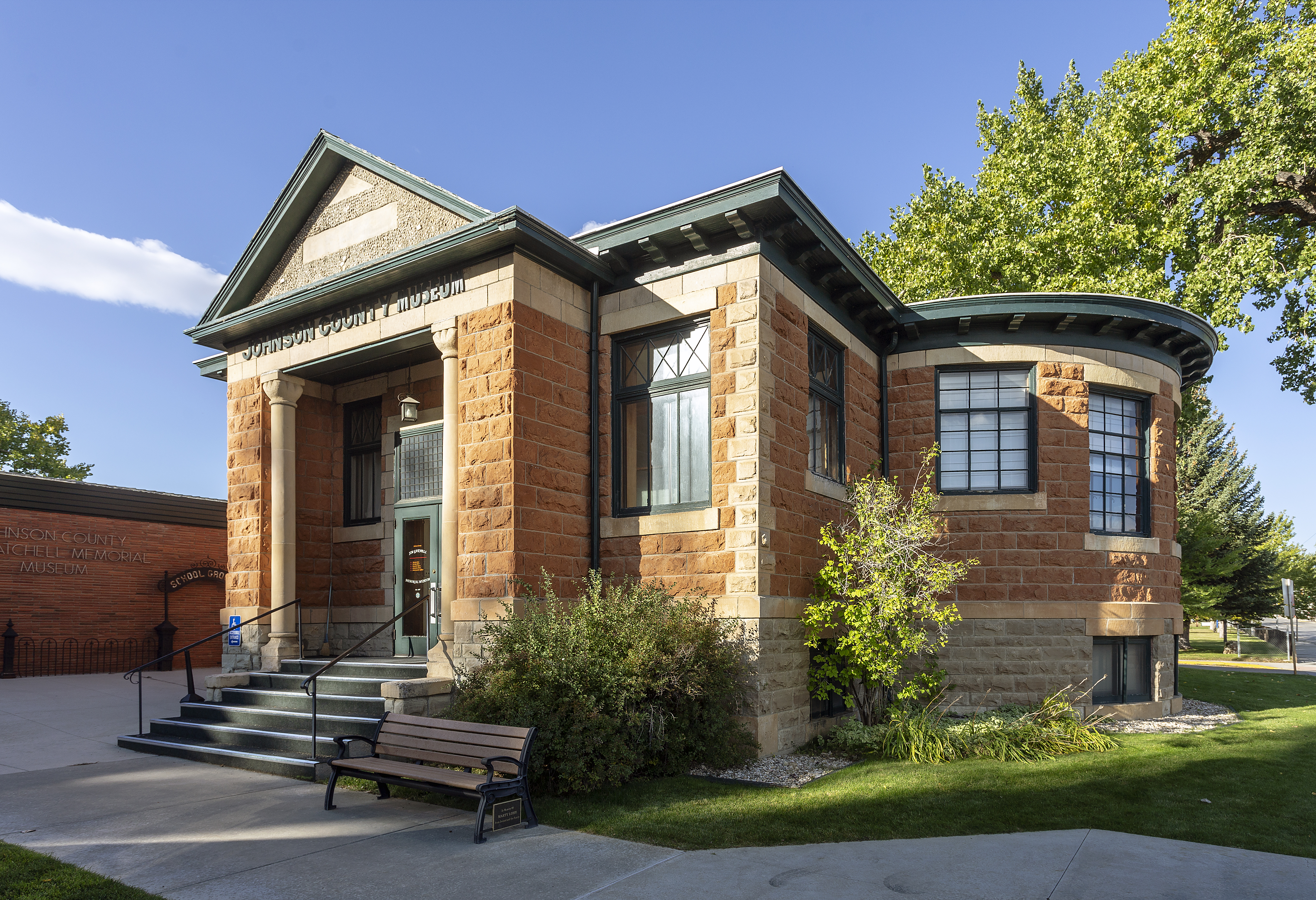

- Location within Wyoming Location within the United States
- Location: Buffalo, Wyoming
- Coordinates: 44°20′53″N 106°41′58″W
- Built: 1909
- Architect: W. M. Butler
- Architectural style: Classical Revival
- NRHP reference No.: 76001949
- Added to NRHP: November 7, 1976

The Jim Gatchell Memorial Museum is an American West museum in Buffalo, Wyoming, housed in a 1909 Carnegie Library building.

== Building history ==
The Carnegie Public Library in Buffalo, Wyoming was built in 1909 adjacent to the Johnson County Courthouse in the Neoclassical style. Andrew Carnegie provided $12,500 to build a library in Buffalo, contingent upon the provision of a site and $1250 a year for maintenance. A portion of the county courthouse grounds was donated as the site. The building consists of a raised main floor and a large basement level. The rough-faced ashlar masonry features contrasting quoins and belt courses. The facade is arranged as a porch with two slender Norman-style columns in antis. A semicircular apse projects from the north side of the building.

== Jim Gatchell Memorial Museum ==
In the late 1980s the Jim Gatchell Memorial Museum acquired and moved into the library. The original museum was founded 1957 and focuses on Johnson County and frontier history. The museum's dioramas feature historic events and life along the Bozeman Trail, including the Wagon Box Fight, the Johnson County War between ranchers in the 1890s, the siege at the TA Ranch and a view of Buffalo's Main Street in 1894. Artifacts include frontier and military weapons, wagons, Native American artifacts, ranching gear, and household and historic items. The grounds include a two-room furnished log cabin.

The Jim Gatchell Memorial Museum is accredited by the American Alliance of Museums.
