= Black and Yellow Trail =

Early automotive trail

The Black and Yellow Trail was the promotional name for the portion of U.S. Route 14 (US 14) nominally linking the Black Hills of South Dakota to Yellowstone National Park. The signed auto trail route was extended by promoters to Chicago in the east. In 1919, it was proposed as a brand for a continuous route from Boston, Massachusetts to Seattle, Washington The headquarters for the promotional association were established in Huron, South Dakota with the aim of diverting traffic from the better-known Yellowstone Trail to the north. The Black and Yellow Trail also included portions of US 16, US 20, and US 41.

Black and Yellow Trail Marker

The Black and Yellow Trail is notable for a 1924 speech by South Dakota state historian Doane Robinson given to the route's organizers, where he first mentioned his proposal to carve figures of historical figures at Mount Rushmore.

== See also ==
- Good Roads Movement
- Lincoln Highway, the first transcontinental auto route
