= Dull Knife Fight =

Part of the Great Sioux War of 1876

- Part of the Great Sioux War of 1876
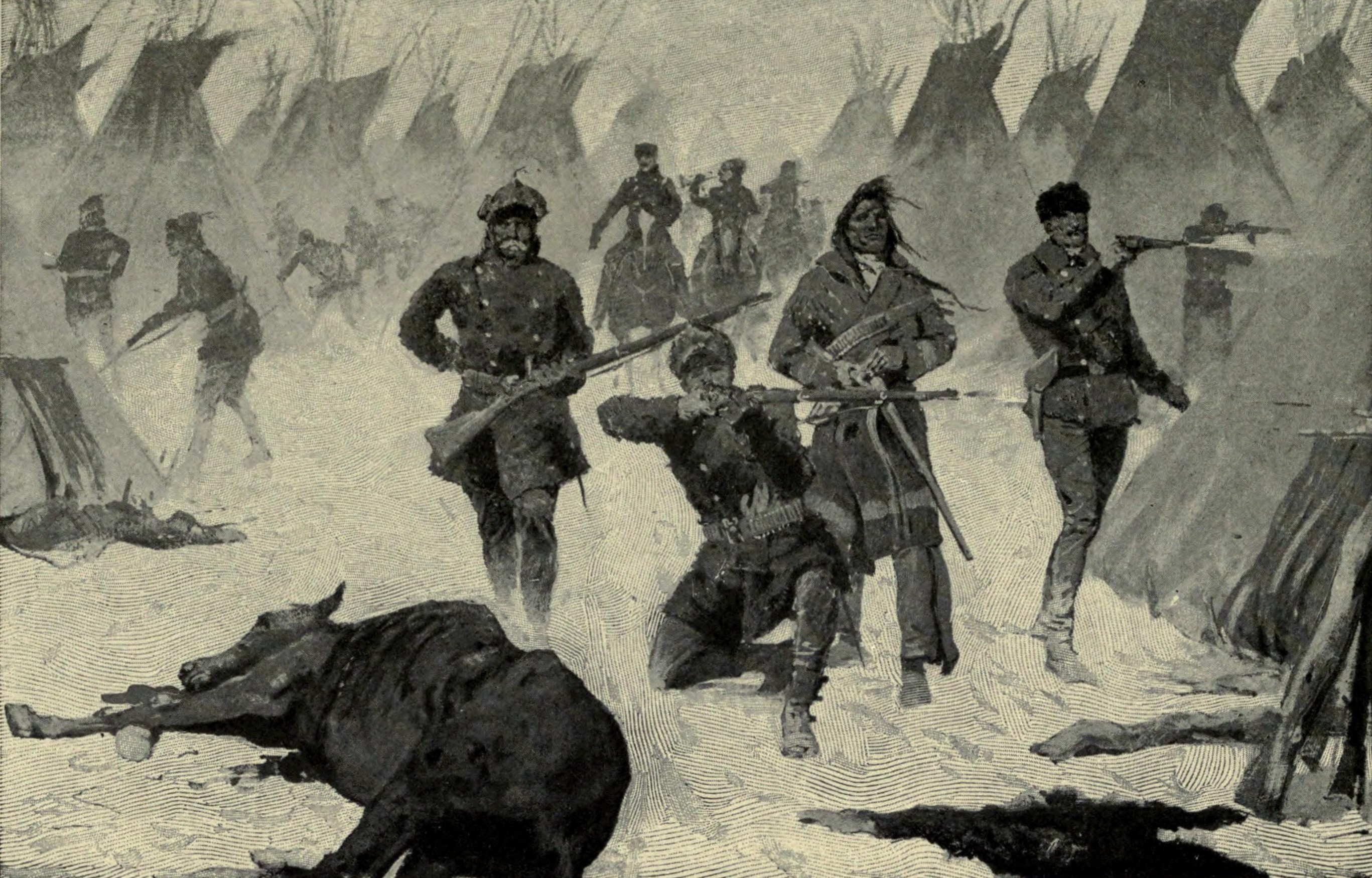
- Mackenzie's men in Dull Knife's village (illustration by F. Remington)
Date	November 25, 1876
Location	Wyoming Territory 43°45′15″N 106°57′01″W
Result	United States victory

Belligerents
Cheyenne	United States

Commanders and leaders
Dull Knife; Little Wolf; Roman Nose; Gray Head; Old Bear	(United States) Ranald S. Mackenzie

Strength
~400	~1,000

Casualties and losses
40 killed Unknown wounded	7 killed 26 wounded

The Dull Knife Fight, or the Battle on the Red Fork, part of the Great Sioux War of 1876, was fought on November 25, 1876, in present-day Johnson County, Wyoming between soldiers and scouts of the United States Army and warriors of the Northern Cheyenne. The battle essentially ended the Northern Cheyennes' ability to continue the fight for their freedom on the Great Plains.

== Background ==
After soldiers from Fort Fetterman in Wyoming Territory under Brigadier General George Crook fought the Northern Cheyenne at the Battle of Powder River, on March 17, 1876, the Battle of Prairie Dog Creek on June 9, 1876, the Battle of the Rosebud on June 17, 1876, and the Battle of Slim Buttes on September 9–10, 1876, General Crook received reinforcements at his Goose Creek, Wyoming supply base and began to move up the old Bozeman Trail towards Crazy Horse. After learning of a village of Cheyennes in October, 1876, Crook sent Colonel Ranald S. Mackenzie into the Southern Powder River Country to locate it.

Colonel Mackenzie departed Camp Robinson, Nebraska with nearly 1,000 soldiers in 11 companies of the 2nd, 3rd, 4th, and 5th United States Cavalry Regiments. He also had a large contingent of 400 Indian scouts, including Pawnee led by Li-heris-oo-li-shar, Shoshone led by O-ho-a-tay, Arapaho led by "Sharp Nose", Sioux led by "Three Bears", Bannocks led by Tup-si-paw, and Cheyenne. The expedition of 1500 officers and men left Fort Fetterman on 14 November 1876, accompanied by four dismounted companies of the 4th Artillery and eleven companies of infantry from the 4th, 9th, 14th and 25th regiments under Colonel Richard I. Dodge, and a medical staff of 6 surgeons. The Indian scouts "scoured" the front, flank and rear up to 40 miles (64 km). The cavalry then pushed forward, ready to fall back on the infantry if necessary. A train of some 168 wagons, 7 ambulances, 219 drivers and attendants, 400 mules and 65 packers in the pack-train supplied the column. They waited out a snow storm at Cantonment Reno until 22 Nov.

== The battle ==
On 23 Nov., a Cheyenne Indian from the Red Cloud Agency informed the soldiers of an "extremely large" Cheyenne village at the source of Crazy Woman Creek, further upstream from the current US camp, in a Bighorn Mountains canyon. Col. Mackenzie was ordered to take the Indian scouts, and all of the cavalry except one company, in search of the village. He led 1000 men, one third of which were Indians.

Eventually on November 25, 1876, Mackenzie found the camp of Dull Knife and Little Wolf on the Red Fork of the Powder River. The Cheyenne warriors were having a celebration because of a recent victory over a Shoshone village.

Mackenzie waited until dawn, then attacked and drove the warriors from the village. Some were forced to leave their clothes, blankets and buffalo robes behind and flee into the frozen countryside. Dull Knife began to offer stiff resistance, and the fighting continued. The Pawnee warriors accompanying the soldiers fought with exceptional ability against the Cheyenne. Second Lieutenant John A. McKinney, of the 4th United States Cavalry Regiment, and five enlisted men were Killed in action. Chief Dull Knife's Cheyenne warriors finally retreated, abandoning their village. The Cheyenne village of 200 lodges and all its contents were entirely destroyed, and the soldiers captured about 700 "head of stock".

== Aftermath ==
Dull Knife lost 3 sons in the fight. "From the desperate cold of the night immediately following they suffered as much. Eleven babies froze to death in the arms of famished mothers..." Finally, the US soldiers recovered articles from the Battle of the Little Bighorn.

Dull Knife's followers were left in the freezing November weather without sufficient clothing, and many suffered from frostbite. In the days that followed, some of the women and children froze to death. Hungry and freezing, many survivors surrendered at Camp Robinson, Nebraska by April 1877. Those who surrendered were exiled to the Southern Cheyenne reservation in Indian Territory. After a year of reservation life in which they were decimated by disease and hunger, many—including Dull Knife and his followers—escaped in what became known as the Northern Cheyenne Exodus.

Other survivors never surrendered. A large number of Dull Knife's band traveled north along the Bighorn Mountains, eventually reaching the upper Tongue River regions. Some joined Chief Crazy Horse's Oglala Sioux camp on Beaver Creek, and on January 8, 1877, would fight alongside Crazy Horse and Two Moon at the Battle of Wolf Mountain on the banks of the Tongue River, in Montana Territory.

The Dull Knife Fight ended the Northern Cheyennes' resistance to the United States for all practical purposes. General Crook telegrammed the War Department, "This will be a terrible blow to the hostiles, as those Cheyennes were not only their bravest warriors but have been the head and front of most all the raids and deviltry committed in this country." There were a few more skirmishes, but by 1884 the Northern Cheyenne people were confined to the Northern Cheyenne Indian Reservation.

== Order of battle ==
Native Americans, Chief's Dull Knife, and Little Coyote (Little Wolf). About 400 warriors.

Native Americans	Tribe	Leaders
Native Americans	Northern Cheyenne	Dull Knife; Little Coyote (Little Wolf)

United States Army Expedition from Camp Robinson, Nebraska, October–November, 1876, Late Major General, Colonel Ranald S. Mackenzie, commanding.

Expedition	Regiment	Companies and Others
Colonel Ranald S. Mackenzie, 4th Cavalry, commanding.	2nd Cavalry Captain James "Teddy" Egan, Lt. Allison	Company K, 2nd United States Cavalry Regiment: Captain James 'Teddy' Egan
Colonel Ranald S. Mackenzie, 4th Cavalry, commanding.	3rd Cavalry Russell, Wessells	Company H, 3rd United States Cavalry Regiment: Company K, 3rd United States Cavalry Regiment:
Colonel Ranald S. Mackenzie, 4th Cavalry, commanding.	4th Cavalry Second Lieutenant John A. McKinney†, Davis, Hemphill	Company B, 4th United States Cavalry Regiment: Company D, 4th United States Cavalry Regiment: Company E, 4th United States Cavalry Regiment: Company F, 4th United States Cavalry Regiment: Company I, 4th United States Cavalry Regiment: Company M, 4th United States Cavalry Regiment:
Colonel Ranald S. Mackenzie, 4th Cavalry, commanding.	5th Cavalry Maj. G.A. Gordon, Capt. John M. Hamilton, Capt. A.B. Taylor, Lt. Wheeler	Company H, 5th United States Cavalry Regiment: Company L, 5th United States Cavalry Regiment:
Colonel Ranald S. Mackenzie, 4th Cavalry, commanding.	Indian Scouts and Guides Major Frank North, Lts. W.P. Clark, W.S. Schuyler, and H. Delaney	Pawnee, Bannocks; Shoshone, Arapaho; Lakota Sioux; Cheyenne

== Dull Knife battlefield ==
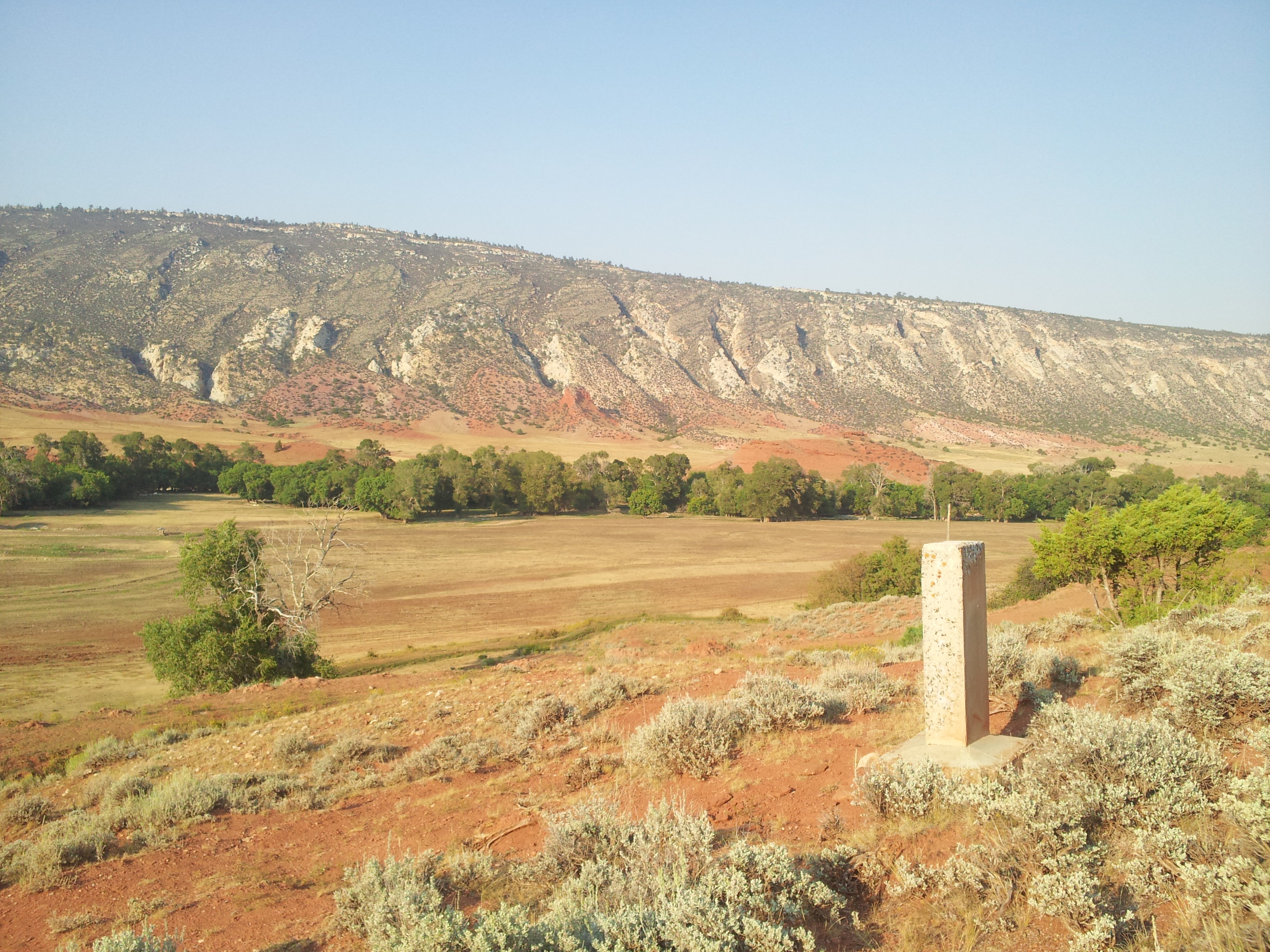
Dull Knife Battlefield

The Dull Knife Battlefield is located east of the Bighorn Mountains in Johnson County, Wyoming near the present day town of Kaycee, Wyoming. The battlefield is on private land and tours are available only by special arrangement. The location is now the site of a cattle ranch.
