= Fort McKinney (Wyoming) =

- U.S. National Register of Historic Places
- U.S. Historic district
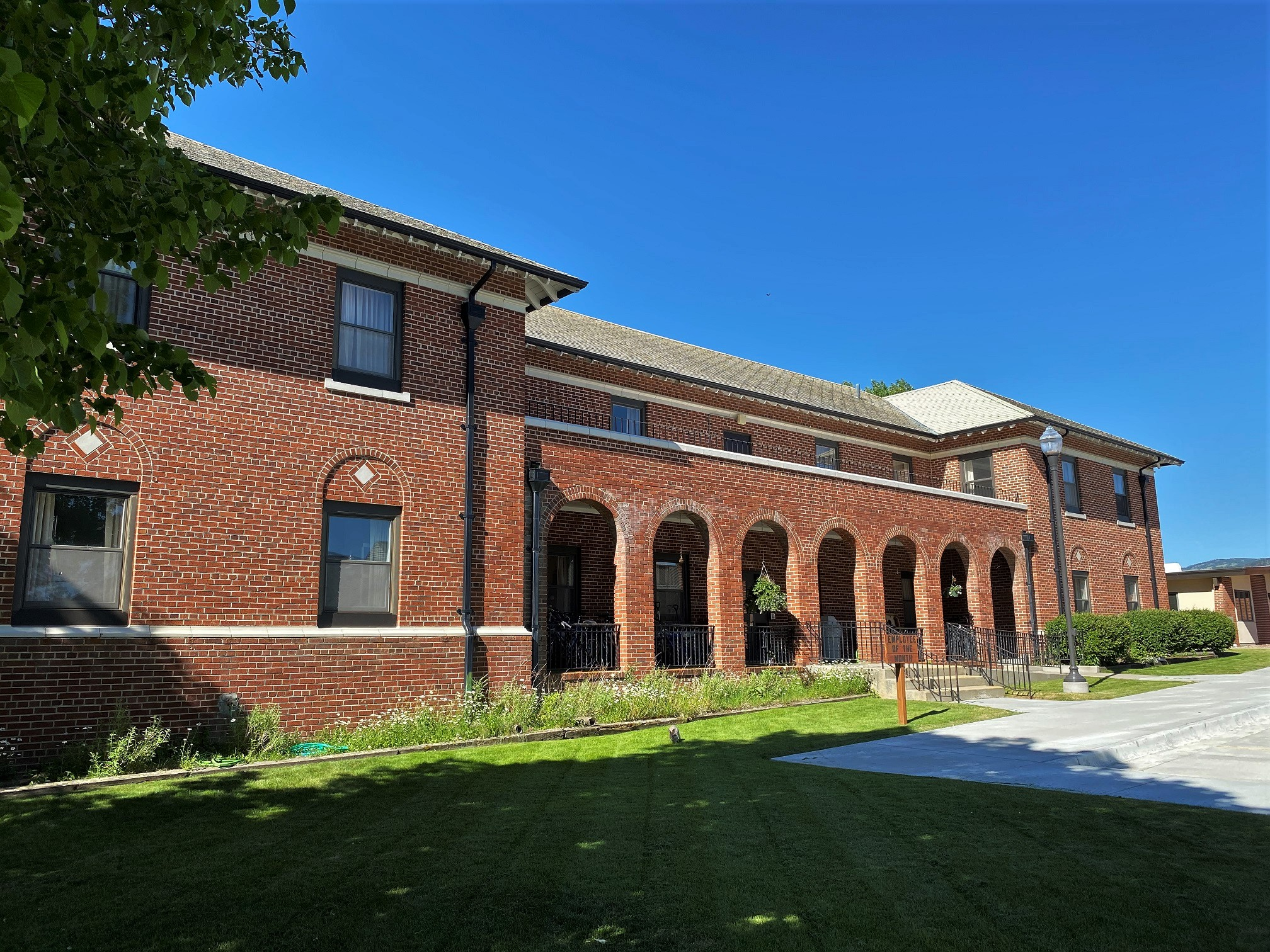
- Nearest city: Buffalo, Wyoming
- Area: 800 acres (320 ha)
- Built: 1878
- NRHP reference No.: 76001950
- Added to NRHP: July 30, 1976

Fort McKinney (1877–1894) was a military post located in North Eastern Wyoming, near the Powder River.

== History summary ==
Fort McKinney was named after Second Lieutenant John McKinney, of the 4th United States Cavalry Regiment, who was Killed in action in the Dull Knife Fight on November 25, 1876, at the Red Fork of the Powder River in Wyoming Territory. The Fort was created in 1877 as part of the intensive reaction to the defeat of Lieutenant Colonel George A. Custer and the 7th Cavalry Regiment at the Battle of the Little Bighorn in June, 1876, and was soon outmoded as the Plains Indian Wars came to an end. McKinney was located first on the Powder River in Wyoming, then moved to the Clear Fork of the Powder River, near present-day Buffalo, Wyoming. The Companies stationed at Fort McKinney throughout its history were of the 6th United States Cavalry Regiment, and the 9th United States Cavalry Regiment, the 9th Cavalry being one of only four completely African-American United States army regiments during the Indian Wars Period, informally called "Buffalo Soldiers". Various Companies of the 6th Cavalry stationed at the Fort took part in Wyoming's "Johnson County War". Fort McKinney was closed in 1894, and the land and remaining buildings transferred to the State of Wyoming, who made the site the Wyoming Soldiers and Sailors Home starting in 1903.

== The first Fort McKinney, on the Powder River (1877-1878) ==
The name Fort McKinney was first given to a military post previously named Cantonment Reno, located on the Powder River near the old Bozeman Trail crossing.

Near this site on the Bozeman Trail Fort Connor (renamed Fort Reno) had been constructed in 1865, but was abandoned after the 1868 Treaty of Fort Laramie. The tribes promptly burned the fort.

Cantonment Reno had been re-established in late 1876, about 3 miles from the site of old Fort Reno. In just 3 months 42 buildings were erected at the Cantonment, including multiple storehouses, living quarters and a hospital. It started as a temporary base of operations for General George Crook's 1876 Big Horn Expedition which had been launched in the fall of 1876 as part of the intensive campaign against the Sioux and Cheyenne following General George A. Custer's defeat at the Battle of the Little Bighorn on June 25, 1876.

On November 25, 1876, part of Crook's command, under the leadership of Col. Ranald S. Mackenzie, attacked a village of Cheyenne (sometimes referred to as "Dull Knife's village") on the nearby Red Fork of the Powder River in the Dull Knife Fight. The army surprised and scattered the Cheyennes driving men, women and children out of their village into subzero temperatures and snow on the open prairie. Cantonment Reno provided logistic support for the attack, and rudimentary care for the army wounded after the battle.

Second Lieutenant John A. McKinney died in the battle on the Red Fork, and in January 1877, Cantonment Reno was renamed Fort McKinney in his honor.

== The second Fort McKinney, on the Clear Fork of the Powder River, near present-day Buffalo Wyoming (1878-1894) ==
By 1878, the first site of Fort McKinney, on the Powder River was experiencing lumber, forage and water shortages. After considerable study a decision was made to relocate Fort McKinney 45 miles northwest, to a site on the Clear Fork of the Powder River. The new site of Fort McKinney was on benchlands just north of the Clear Fork, and only a few miles from where the stream issues from the Big Horn Mountains. The site is located two miles west of present-day Buffalo, Wyoming.

Construction at the new site of Fort McKinney started in 1878 by two companies of the 9th Infantry, commanded by Captain Pollock. The new fort, at peak of development, had buildings to house seven companies of troops, officer's quarters, a warehouse, administrative offices, bakery, dairy, laundress quarters, a hospital, and auxiliary structures.

== Changing role after 1878 ==
When built on the Clear Fork of the Powder in 1878 the purpose of the Fort was to provide support and supplies to army campaigns aimed at driving Sioux and Cheyenne Plains Indian groups out of their buffalo hunting grounds located in the Powder River country between the Black Hills and the Big Horn Mountains.

These lands in the Powder River Basin had been ceded to the Sioux in the Fort Laramie Treaty of 1868 as a hunting preserve to supplement the Sioux reservations lands in the southwest quarter of the Dakota Territory. Since the 1860s, several groups of Indians, most notably Sitting Bull's band of Sioux had lived year-round in this vast hunting preserve and never gone to the reservations in the Dakota Territory.

When gold was discovered on the Sioux Reservation in the Black Hills area in 1874 this caused a rush of miners into the Black Hills to Deadwood, Lead and other sites. The United States demanded that the Sioux cede back the Black Hills area, and the refusal by the Sioux resulted in the Great Sioux War of 1876, during which the Sioux defeated General George A. Custer at the Battle of the Little Bighorn on June 25, 1876.

The United States Army used this defeat as a provocation to launch a massive campaign starting in the fall of 1876 to prevent the Sioux and Cheyenne from continuing their old nomadic way of life in the Powder River Country, and to force these Indian groups out of their vast hunting preserve and onto the reservations along the Missouri River.

By the end of 1878 these intensive military campaigns had driven the Sioux and Cheyenne Indian bands who had lived in the Powder River country to move onto the reservations or, in the case of Sitting Bull, to flee to Canada. This brought a swift end to active campaigning against hostile Indian groups in the Powder River Basin and surrounding areas.

The end of active Indian war campaigns on the northern plains caused the fort to shift its role to keeping Shoshoni, Arapahoe and Crow tribes, who had reservations in the general area, from resuming intermittent strife with other groups seen as tribal enemies. Another role was to keep bands of these tribes from becoming embroiled with settlers.

Tribal Indian groups quickly became dependent on government rationing on the reservations and thus became tied to their reservation areas. As this occurred, the Fort's role shifted again to providing security and support to civilians living in the vicinity. The comforting presence of Fort McKinney was a major impetus to the founding of the nearby community of Buffalo, Wyoming in 1879.

With the Indians removed from the scene, between 1878 and 1882 "hide hunters" had swiftly killed off the vast herds of buffalo that had roamed in the Powder River country, shipping their hides east where they were primarily used for industrial belting.

I this same period, the vast but now empty grasslands along the Powder River attracted businessmen who started the Wyoming cattle industry, utilizing the transcontinental Union Pacific railroad that ran through the southern half of Wyoming to ship their cattle to market. The presence of the fort encouraged the growing cattle industry in the sparsely settled Powder River grasslands.

Fort McKinney troops built and maintained the first telegraph line in the region. Fort McKinney troops guarded the Rock Creek Stage Line, which provided mail, passenger and express service from Rock Creek (near present-day Rock River, Wyoming) to Terry's Landing (near present-day Custer, Montana) on the Yellowstone in Montana Territory. This stage route extended over 200 miles across mostly empty country, and Fort McKinney's location near the midpoint of the line helped prevent trouble along the line.

In the 1880s and 1890s units of the 6th Cavalry were assigned to the Fort, as well as units of the black 9th Cavalry. The fort was a duty station for soldiers who had gained military fame in other venues, including Sgt. John Nihill and Charles B. Gatewood. Lt. Gatewood is recalled for his interaction with Geronimo. Sgt. Nihill is recalled for his heroics in Arizona, and for his skill as a marksman with a rifle, which he developed and then displayed over a period of years, including a stint at Ft. McKinney in 1882 and 1883.

== Involvement in the Johnson County War ==
On April 13, 1892, troops of the 6th Cavalry at the fort received orders by telegraph from President Benjamin Harrison to intervene in Wyoming's Johnson County War. The troops were ordered to take into custody about 40 persons, consisting mostly of Texas gunmen with a few Wyoming stockmen mixed in. They had become besieged at the TA ranch, south of Buffalo, by irate citizens of Buffalo and Johnson County. The stockmen, acting outside the law, had hired the gunman to undertake an "invasion" of Johnson County intent on killing a list of men they believed to be cattle thieves. The citizens had risen, armed themselves and surrounded the "invaders" and were carrying forward plans to burn them out of the ranch buildings where they had taken refuge when the cavalry arrived in the nick of time.

Lt. Charles B. Gatewood was a United States cavalry officer who had gained fame in 1886 when he took a small contingent of soldiers, scouts and interpreters and located the Apache war leader Geronimo at a remote location in Mexico, and then personally convinced Geronimo to make his final surrender to General Nelson Miles at Skeleton Canyon, Arizona on September 4, 1886. In September 1891 Lt. Gatewood was assigned to the 6th Cavalry, then stationed at Fort McKinney, Wyoming. He had rejoined his unit after a convalescence for rheumatism. After the events of April 1892, on May 18, 1892, cowboys from a local ranch set fire to the Post Exchange at Fort McKinney and planted a bomb in the form of gunpowder in a barracks stove. Gatewood was responding to the fire and was injured by a bomb blast in a barracks; his left arm was shattered, rendering him too disabled to serve in the Cavalry. He was discharged in November 1892, and died a year later of stomach cancer.

The large stockmen of Wyoming, who held political control of the state, demanded that their United States Senator arrange to send black troops to Wyoming to "prevent any sympathetic relations that might develop between small ranchers and white troops". Soon after, The Ninth Cavalry of "Buffalo Soldiers" was ordered to Fort McKinney to replace the Sixth Cavalry.

== Closure in 1894, transfer to state of Wyoming, becoming the Wyoming Soldiers and Sailors Home in 1903 ==
In 1894 the fort was closed. Some of the buildings were disposed of, and the remainder, along with a large tract of land was turned over by the U.S. government to the state of Wyoming. Following the transfer most of the rest of the buildings were changed or dismantled. In 1903 Wyoming established the Wyoming Soldiers and Sailors Home at the site. The old fort hospital building, moved from its original location, is today the visitors' house of the home. The only other remaining structures at the site are a mule and cavalry stable, now used as a garage, the dairy, and some foundations.

== Visiting ==
The site of the first Ft. McKinney, aka Cantonment Reno, is located in Johnson County, Wyoming. The site is in an open prairie environment on the Powder river, near the old Bozeman Trail crossing of the Powder River. No buildings or significant ruins remain from the active period in 1876–77. It may be visited year-round as weather permits.

The site of the second Fort McKinney on Clear Fork of the Powder, is commemorated by a highway interpretive sign located about two miles west of Buffalo, Wyo., on U.S. Highway 16.

== See also ==
- Cantonment Reno
- Fort Reno (Wyoming)
- Bozeman Trail
- Johnson County War
- Battle of the Little Bighorn
- Charles B. Gatewood
- George Crook
- Buffalo, Wyoming
- John Nihill

== Note ==
The original Fort Reno built in 1865 on the Bozeman Trail was named for General Jesse L. Reno, a civil war general killed in September 1862 while commanding an army corps at Fox's Gap at the Battle of South Mountain, Maryland. Neither the original Fort Reno, nor Cantonment Reno had any connection with Major Marcus Reno, an officer at the Battle of the Little Bighorn.
