= Sussex, Wyoming =

- Unincorporated community
- Location within Wyoming Location within the United States
- Coordinates: 43°41′54″N 106°17′42″W
- Country: United States
- State: Wyoming
- County: Johnson
- Elevation: 4,383 ft (1,336 m)
- Time zone: UTC-7 (Mountain (MST))
  - Summer (DST): UTC-6 (MDT)
- Area code: 307
- GNIS feature ID: 1597516

Sussex is an unincorporated community in Johnson County, Wyoming, United States. Sussex is located on Wyoming Highway 192, 17.25 miles (27.76 km) east of Kaycee.
