= List of highways numbered 333 =

Route 333, or Highway 333, may refer to:

== Australia ==
- Holdsworth Road

== Canada ==
- Newfoundland and Labrador Route 333
- Nova Scotia Route 333
- Prince Edward Island Route 333
- Quebec Route 333

== Costa Rica ==
- National Route 333

== Israel ==
- Israel National Highway 333

== Japan ==
- Japan National Route 333

== United States ==
- Arkansas Highway 333
- County Road 333 (Liberty County, Florida)
- Georgia State Route 333 (former)
- Georgia State Route 333
- Iowa Highway 333
- Kentucky Route 333
- Louisiana Highway 333
- Maryland Route 333
- Minnesota State Highway 333
- Mississippi Highway 333
- New Mexico State Road 333
- New York:
  - New York State Route 333 (former)
  - County Route 333 (Erie County, New York)
  - County Route 333 (Steuben County, New York)
- Ohio State Route 333 (disambiguation)
- Pennsylvania Route 333
- South Carolina Highway 333
- Tennessee State Route 333
- Texas:
  - Texas State Highway 333 (former)
  - Texas State Highway Loop 333 (former)
  - Farm to Market Road 333
- Virginia State Route 333
- Wyoming Highway 333 (former)

Other areas:

- Puerto Rico Highway 333
- U.S. Virgin Islands Highway 333

Preceded by 332	Lists of highways 333	Succeeded by 334
