= List of highways numbered 338 =

Route 338, or Highway 338, may refer to:

== Canada ==
- Manitoba Provincial Road 338
- Prince Edward Island Route 338
- Quebec Route 338

== Hungary ==
- Main road 338 (Hungary)

== Japan ==
- Japan National Route 338

== Thailand ==
- Highway 338 (Thailand)

== United Kingdom ==
- A338 road, Bournemouth, Dorset to Besselsleigh

== United States ==
- Georgia State Route 338
- Kentucky Route 338
- Maryland Route 338 (former)
- Nevada State Route 338
- New Mexico State Road 338
- New York:
  - New York State Route 338 (disambiguation)
  - County Route 338 (Erie County, New York)
  - County Route 338 (Saratoga County, New York)
  - County Route 338 (Wayne County, New York)
- Ohio State Route 338 (former)
  - Ohio State Route 338J (former)
- Pennsylvania Route 338
- Puerto Rico Highway 338
- Tennessee State Route 338
- Texas:
  - Texas State Highway 338
  - Texas State Highway Loop 338
- Virginia State Route 338
- Wyoming Highway 338

Preceded by 337	Lists of highways 338	Succeeded by 339
