= List of highways numbered 337 =

The following highways are numbered 337:

== Canada ==
- Nova Scotia Route 337
- Prince Edward Island Route 337
- Quebec Route 337

== Japan ==
- Japan National Route 337

== United Kingdom ==
- A337 road, Cadnam to Christchurch, Dorset

== United States ==
- Arkansas Highway 337
- Connecticut Route 337
- Florida:
  - County Road 337 (Alachua County, Florida)
  - County Road 337 (Levy County, Florida)
- Georgia State Route 337
- Indiana State Road 337
- Louisiana Highway 337
  - Louisiana Highway 337-1
- Maryland Route 337
- New York:
  - New York State Route 337 (disambiguation)
  - County Route 337 (Erie County, New York)
- Puerto Rico Highway 337
- Texas:
  - Texas State Highway 337
  - Texas State Highway Loop 337
  - Ranch to Market Road 337
- Virginia State Route 337
  - Virginia State Route 337 Alternate (Portsmouth)
- Wyoming Highway 337

Preceded by 336	Lists of highways 337	Succeeded by 338
