= Wyoming Highway 332 =

State highway in Wyoming, United States

Wyoming Highway 332
- WYO 332 highlighted in red

Route information
- Maintained by WYDOT
- Length: 5.44 mi (8.75 km)

Major junctions
- South end: US 87 / WYO 335 south of Sheridan
- North end: I-90 BL / US 14 / US 87 in Sheridan

Location
- Country: United States
- State: Wyoming
- Counties: Sheridan

Highway system
- Wyoming State Highway System; Interstate; US; State
← WYO 331	→ WYO 333

Wyoming Highway 332 (WYO 332) is a 5.44-mile (8.75 km) north-south state highway in central Sheridan County, Wyoming United States, that connects U.S. Route 87 (US 87) and Wyoming Highway 335 (WYO 335), south of Sheridan, with Interstate 90 Business Loop I-90 BL)/U.S. Route 14 (US 14)/US 87 (South Main Street) in Sheridan.

== Route description ==
WYO 335 begins its southern end just south of Sheridan at an intersection with US 87 and the northern terminus of WYO 335. WYO 332 heads north, named Big Horn Avenue, and roughly parallels US 87 on its way into Sheridan. Passing east of the Sheridan County Airport, WYO 332 intersects the western terminus of Wyoming Highway 334 (E. Brundage Ln.) at 3.8 miles before intersecting the eastern terminus of Wyoming Highway 333 (Airport Rd.) at just over 4 miles which provides access to the airport. One mile north, WYO 332 turns east for one block onto W. College Avenue and then turns north onto S. Main Street to finish its routing. Highway 332 reaches its northern terminus at an intersection with I-90 BL/US 14/US 87.

== Major intersections ==
The entire route is in Sheridan County.

Location	mi	km	Destinations	Notes
	0.00	0.00	US 87 / WYO 335	Northern terminus WYO 335
Sheridan	3.82	6.15	WYO 334	Western terminus of WYO 334
Sheridan	4.07	6.55	WYO 333	Eastern terminus of WYO 333
Sheridan	5.44	8.75	I-90 BL / US 14 / US 87	
1.000 mi = 1.609 km; 1.000 km = 0.621 mi

== See also ==
- List of state highways in Wyoming
