= List of highways numbered 339 =

The following highways are numbered 339:

== Canada ==
- Prince Edward Island Route 339
- Quebec Route 339
- Saskatchewan Highway 339

== India ==
- National Highway 339 (India)

== Ireland ==
- R339 regional road

== Japan ==
- Japan National Route 339

== United Kingdom ==
- A339 road, Alton, Hampshire to Newbury, Berkshire

== United States ==
- Georgia State Route 339
- Louisiana Highway 339
- Nevada State Route 339
- New York:
  - New York State Route 339 (former)
    - New York State Route 339 (former)
  - County Route 339 (Saratoga County, New York)
- Ohio State Route 339
- Oregon Route 339
- Pennsylvania Route 339
- Texas State Highway 339
- Virginia State Route 339
- Washington State Route 339
- Wyoming Highway 339

Territories

- Puerto Rico Highway 339

Preceded by 338	Lists of highways 339	Succeeded by 340
