= Tongue Butte =

Mountain in Wyoming, United States

Coordinates: 44°46′4.97″N 107°17′24.43″W

Tongue Butte is a summit in Sheridan County, Wyoming, in the United States. With an elevation of 7,946 feet (2,422 m), Tongue Butte is the 885th tallest mountain in Wyoming.
