= List of highways numbered 334 =

The following highways are numbered 334:

== Australia ==
- Boort-Mitiamo Rd
- Echuca-Mitiamo Rd

== Canada ==
- Manitoba Provincial Road 334
- Newfoundland and Labrador Route 334
- Nova Scotia Route 334
- Prince Edward Island Route 334
- Saskatchewan Highway 334

== Costa Rica ==
- National Route 334

== India ==
- National Highway 334 (India)

== Japan ==
- Japan National Route 334

== United States ==
- Connecticut Route 334
- Georgia State Route 334
- Indiana State Road 334 (former)
- Maryland Route 334
- New York:
  - New York State Route 334
  - County Route 334 (Erie County, New York)
  - County Route 334 (Wayne County, New York)
- Ohio State Route 334
- Oregon Route 334
- Puerto Rico Highway 334
- Tennessee State Route 334
- Texas:
  - Texas State Highway 334
  - Texas State Highway Loop 334 (former)
- Virginia State Route 334
- Wyoming Highway 334

Preceded by 333	Lists of highways 334	Succeeded by 335
