= Wyoming Highway 333 =

Former state highway in Wyoming, United States

Wyoming Highway 333
- Airport Road
- WYO 333 highlighted in red

Route information
- Maintained by WYDOT
- Length: 0.75 mi (1,210 m)
- Existed: ?–c. 2013

Major junctions
- West end: Sheridan County Airport in Sheridan
- East end: WYO 332 in Sheridan

Location
- Country: United States
- State: Wyoming
- Counties: Sheridan

Highway system
- Wyoming State Highway System; Interstate; US; State
← WYO 332	→ WYO 334

Wyoming Highway 333 (WYO 333) was a Wyoming state highway known as Airport Road. WYO 333 served as a connector between Wyoming Highway 332 and the Sheridan County Airport. Mileposts for Route 333 increased from east to west as the route entered the airport. In total it was only 0.75 miles (1.21 km) long.

== Route description ==
WYO 333 traveled north from the Sheridan County Airport and turned due east before coming to its terminus with WYO 332 at a t-intersection.

== Major intersections ==
The entire route was in Sheridan, Sheridan County.

mi	km	Destinations	Notes
0.00	0.00	Sheridan County Airport	Western Terminus of WYO 333
0.75	1.21	WYO 332	Eastern Terminus of WYO 333
1.000 mi = 1.609 km; 1.000 km = 0.621 mi
