= List of highways numbered 336 =

The following highways are numbered 336:

== Canada ==
- Manitoba Provincial Road 336
- Nova Scotia Route 336
- Prince Edward Island Route 336

== Costa Rica ==
- National Route 336

== India ==
- National Highway 336 (India)

== Italy ==
- State road 336

== Japan ==
- Japan National Route 336

== United States ==
- Arkansas Highway 336
- Florida:
  - County Road 336 (Levy County, Florida)
  - County Road 336 (Marion County, Florida)
- Georgia State Route 336 (former)
- Illinois Route 336
- Louisiana Highway 336
  - Louisiana Highway 336-1
  - Louisiana Highway 336-2
- Maryland Route 336
- Minnesota State Highway 336
- New York:
  - New York State Route 336
  - County Route 336 (Erie County, New York)
- Puerto Rico Highway 336
- South Carolina Highway 336
- Tennessee State Route 336
- Texas:
  - Texas State Highway 336
  - Texas State Highway Loop 336
- Virginia State Route 336
- Wyoming Highway 336

Preceded by 335	Lists of highways 336	Succeeded by 337
