= List of highways numbered 341 =

The following highways are numbered 341:

== Canada ==
- Manitoba Provincial Road 341
- Newfoundland and Labrador Route 341
- Nova Scotia Route 341
- Prince Edward Island Route 341
- Quebec Route 341

== India ==
- National Highway 341

== Japan ==
- Japan National Route 341

== United Kingdom ==
- A341 road, Merley to Bournemouth, Dorset

== United States ==
- U.S. Route 341
- Arkansas Highway 341
- Connecticut Route 341
- Georgia State Route 341
- Indiana State Road 341
- Louisiana Highway 341
- Maryland Route 341
- Nevada State Route 341
- New York:
  - New York State Route 341 (former)
    - New York State Route 341 (former)
  - County Route 341 (Erie County, New York)
- Pennsylvania Route 341
- Puerto Rico Highway 341
- Tennessee State Route 341
- Texas State Highway 341
- Virginia State Route 341
- Wisconsin Highway 341
- Wyoming Highway 341

Preceded by 340	Lists of highways 341	Succeeded by 342
