= Wyarno, Wyoming =

Unincorporated community in Sheridan County, Wyoming, United States

- Unincorporated community
- Location within the state of Wyoming Wyarno, Wyoming (the United States)
- Coordinates: 44°48′48″N 106°46′26″W
- Country: United States
- State: Wyoming
- County: Sheridan
- Elevation: 3,783 ft (1,153 m)
- Time zone: UTC-7 (Mountain (MST))
  - Summer (DST): UTC-6 (MDT)
- ZIP codes: 82845
- GNIS feature ID: 1597548

Wyarno is an unincorporated community in central Sheridan County, Wyoming, United States. It lies along Wyoming Highway 336, approximately 10 miles (16 km) east of the city of Sheridan, the county seat of Sheridan County. Although Wyarno is unincorporated, it has a post office, with the ZIP code of 82845. Public education in the community of Wyarno is provided by Sheridan County School District #2.

== Geography ==
Wyarno lies on the high plains about 12.5 miles (20.1 km) south of Montana, in the small Dutch Creek valley. The town is about 25 miles (40 km) east of the Big Horn Mountains and Bighorn National Forest. There are few populated places to the east of Wyarno. South of town about 25 miles (40 km) is Ucross, Wyoming, at the intersection of U.S. Route 14 and U.S. Route 16. Wyarno's elevation is 3,786 feet (1,154 m). The BNSF Railway line between Sheridan and Gillette passes by town.

=== Climate ===
Sheridan Field Station is a weather station near Wyarno. Sheridan Field Station has a cold semi-arid climate (Köppen BSk).

Climate data for Sheridan Field Station, Wyoming, 1991–2020 normals, 1920-2020 extremes: 3750ft (1143m)
Month	Jan	Feb	Mar	Apr	May	Jun	Jul	Aug	Sep	Oct	Nov	Dec	Year
Record high °F (°C)	70 (21)	74 (23)	80 (27)	88 (31)	96 (36)	106 (41)	109 (43)	105 (41)	104 (40)	95 (35)	80 (27)	78 (26)	109 (43)
Mean maximum °F (°C)	55.9 (13.3)	57.0 (13.9)	71.2 (21.8)	80.3 (26.8)	86.2 (30.1)	94.6 (34.8)	101.8 (38.8)	100.4 (38.0)	95.8 (35.4)	83.6 (28.7)	69.5 (20.8)	56.3 (13.5)	103.0 (39.4)
Mean daily maximum °F (°C)	33.7 (0.9)	36.5 (2.5)	47.5 (8.6)	56.0 (13.3)	65.3 (18.5)	76.1 (24.5)	87.2 (30.7)	86.4 (30.2)	75.1 (23.9)	58.9 (14.9)	44.9 (7.2)	34.5 (1.4)	58.5 (14.7)
Daily mean °F (°C)	21.9 (−5.6)	24.7 (−4.1)	34.8 (1.6)	43.2 (6.2)	52.6 (11.4)	62.3 (16.8)	71.1 (21.7)	69.0 (20.6)	58.6 (14.8)	44.9 (7.2)	32.2 (0.1)	23.0 (−5.0)	44.9 (7.1)
Mean daily minimum °F (°C)	10.1 (−12.2)	12.8 (−10.7)	22.1 (−5.5)	30.4 (−0.9)	39.8 (4.3)	48.6 (9.2)	55.0 (12.8)	51.7 (10.9)	42.1 (5.6)	30.9 (−0.6)	19.6 (−6.9)	11.5 (−11.4)	31.2 (−0.4)
Mean minimum °F (°C)	−16.5 (−26.9)	−12.7 (−24.8)	−0.7 (−18.2)	13.8 (−10.1)	23.6 (−4.7)	34.2 (1.2)	43.0 (6.1)	39.1 (3.9)	28.5 (−1.9)	12.3 (−10.9)	−4.7 (−20.4)	−12.2 (−24.6)	−23.3 (−30.7)
Record low °F (°C)	−40 (−40)	−38 (−39)	−24 (−31)	−14 (−26)	7 (−14)	28 (−2)	28 (−2)	29 (−2)	4 (−16)	−18 (−28)	−26 (−32)	−44 (−42)	−44 (−42)
Average precipitation inches (mm)	0.52 (13)	0.41 (10)	0.71 (18)	1.41 (36)	2.91 (74)	2.30 (58)	1.09 (28)	0.73 (19)	1.43 (36)	1.48 (38)	0.46 (12)	0.43 (11)	13.88 (353)
Average snowfall inches (cm)	7.80 (19.8)	4.20 (10.7)	4.50 (11.4)	5.30 (13.5)	0.60 (1.5)	0.00 (0.00)	0.00 (0.00)	0.00 (0.00)	0.10 (0.25)	2.40 (6.1)	3.10 (7.9)	5.20 (13.2)	33.2 (84.35)
Source 1: NOAA
Source 2: XMACIS (temp records & monthly max/mins)

Climate data for Wyarno, Wyoming
Month	Jan	Feb	Mar	Apr	May	Jun	Jul	Aug	Sep	Oct	Nov	Dec	Year
Record high °F (°C)	70 (21)	80 (27)	80 (27)	88 (31)	96 (36)	106 (41)	109 (43)	105 (41)	104 (40)	92 (33)	80 (27)	78 (26)	109 (43)
Mean daily maximum °F (°C)	32.3 (0.2)	36.7 (2.6)	44.9 (7.2)	57.2 (14.0)	67.3 (19.6)	76.6 (24.8)	87.7 (30.9)	86.8 (30.4)	74.8 (23.8)	61.8 (16.6)	45.4 (7.4)	35.5 (1.9)	58.9 (14.9)
Daily mean °F (°C)	19.3 (−7.1)	23.7 (−4.6)	32.2 (0.1)	43.4 (6.3)	53.3 (11.8)	62.1 (16.7)	70.6 (21.4)	68.8 (20.4)	57.7 (14.3)	46.1 (7.8)	32 (0)	22.5 (−5.3)	44.3 (6.8)
Mean daily minimum °F (°C)	6.2 (−14.3)	10.7 (−11.8)	19.5 (−6.9)	29.7 (−1.3)	39.3 (4.1)	47.6 (8.7)	53.4 (11.9)	50.9 (10.5)	40.6 (4.8)	30.4 (−0.9)	18.6 (−7.4)	9.6 (−12.4)	29.7 (−1.3)
Record low °F (°C)	−40 (−40)	−38 (−39)	−24 (−31)	−14 (−26)	13 (−11)	28 (−2)	32 (0)	29 (−2)	4 (−16)	−18 (−28)	−26 (−32)	−44 (−42)	−44 (−42)
Average precipitation inches (mm)	0.5 (13)	0.5 (13)	0.9 (23)	1.8 (46)	2.6 (66)	2.7 (69)	1.2 (30)	0.9 (23)	1.4 (36)	1.3 (33)	0.7 (18)	0.5 (13)	14.9 (380)
Average snowfall inches (cm)	7.3 (19)	6.6 (17)	9 (23)	5.1 (13)	0.8 (2.0)	0.1 (0.25)	0.0 (0.0)	0.0 (0.0)	0.3 (0.76)	2.1 (5.3)	5.3 (13)	6.4 (16)	43 (110)
Average precipitation days (≥ 0.01 in.)	5	5	7	9	10	10	6	5	6	7	5	5	80
Average snowy days (≥ 0.1 in.)	2.7	2.6	2.4	1.3	0.3	0.0	0.0	0.0	0.0	0.5	1.5	2.9	14.2
Source: weatherbase.com
