= List of highways numbered 340 =

The following highways are numbered 340:

== Canada ==
- Manitoba Provincial Road 340
- New Brunswick Route 340
- Newfoundland and Labrador Route 340
- Nova Scotia Route 340
- Prince Edward Island Route 340
- Quebec Route 340
- Saskatchewan Highway 340

== India ==
- National Highway 340 (India)

== Japan ==
- Japan National Route 340

== Norway ==
- Fv340

== United Kingdom ==
- A340 road, Basingstoke, Hampshire to Pangbourne, Berkshire

== United States ==
- U.S. Route 340
- Arkansas Highway 340
- Colorado State Highway 340
- Georgia State Route 340 (former)
- Hawaii Route 340
- Indiana State Road 340
- Missouri Route 340
- Nevada State Route 340
- New York State Route 340
- Ohio State Route 340
- Pennsylvania Route 340
- Texas:
  - Texas State Highway 340 (former)
  - Texas State Highway Loop 340
- Wyoming Highway 340

Preceded by 339	Lists of highways 340	Succeeded by 341
