= Wyoming Highway 331 =

State highway in Sheridan County, Wyoming, United States

Wyoming Highway 331
- WYO 331 highlighted in red

Route information
- Maintained by WYDOT
- Length: 9.92 mi (15.96 km)

Major junctions
- West end: CR 53 in Beckton
- East end: I-90 BL / US 14 Bus. / US 87 in Sheridan

Location
- Country: United States
- State: Wyoming
- Counties: Sheridan

Highway system
- Wyoming State Highway System; Interstate; US; State
| ← WYO 330 | → WYO 332 |

Wyoming Highway 331 (WYO 331) is a 9.92-mile (15.96 km) east-west state highway in central Sheridan County, Wyoming, United States. It connects Sheridan County Route 53 (CR 53) in Beckton with Interstate 90 Business / U.S. Route 14 Business / U.S. Route 87 (I-90 BL / US 14 Bus. / US 87) in Sheridan.

== Route description ==
WYO 331 begins at the north end of CR 53 (Big Goose Canyon Road) on the north bank of Big Goose Creek in the unincorporated community of Beckton. From its western terminus, WYO 331 heads briefly north on Big Goose Canyon Road before turning to head east-northeast, roughly paralleling the course of the Big Goose Creek. After heading east-northeast for roughly 8 miles (13 km), WYO 331 reaches the outer limits of the city (and county seat) of Sheridan and becomes West Louks Street. After continuing northeast for about 1.2 miles (1.9 km) into Sheridan, it turns due east along West Louks Street. Approximately 0.8 miles (1.3 km) farther, it reaches its eastern terminus at I-90 BL / US 14 / US 87 (Main Street) in downtown Sheridan. (East Louks Street continues east from the eastern terminus.)

== Major intersections ==
The entire route is in Sheridan County.

| Location | mi | km | Destinations | Notes |
|---|---|---|---|---|
| Beckton | 0.00 | 0.00 | CR 53 south (Big Goose Canyon Road) | Continuation south from western terminus |
| Beckton | 0.00 | 0.00 | Big Goose Creek and western terminus | |
| Sheridan | 9.92 | 15.96 | I-90 BL east / US 14 Bus. east / US 87 south (N Main St) – Ranchester, Billings (Montana) I-90 BL west / US 14 Bus. west / US 87 north (S Main St) – Buffalo, Gillette, Casper | Eastern terminus |
| Sheridan | 9.92 | 15.96 | E Loucks St east | Continuation east from eastern terminus |
1.000 mi = 1.609 km; 1.000 km = 0.621 mi: Route transition

== See also ==
- List of state highways in Wyoming
