= Business routes of Interstate 90 =

Interstate 90 Business

Location
- Country: United States

Highway system
- Interstate Highway System; Main; Auxiliary; Suffixed; Business; Future

Interstate 90 Business may refer to several business routes of the Interstate Highway System that connects Interstate 90 with the central business district of various cities bypassed by I-90. Each business route can be either a business loop or a business spur, depending on whether both ends connect to I-90. The business route in each community is considered a unique route. In many cases, these routes are a former section of a U.S. Route.

== Washington ==
=== Cle Elum loop ===
Interstate 90 Business
- Location: Cle Elum, Washington

Interstate 90 Business was a former business loop through Cle Elum that connected with I-90 from an eastbound only flyover interchange on Old US 10 at eastbound Exit 84. It ran along 1st Street going through Cle Elum and continued east on where SR 903 is currently located. It then went south back to I-90 along where SR 10 and SR 970 currently run together at exit 85. It was the westernmost business route along I-90 until it was decommissioned in the 1990s.

Major intersections
The entire route is in Kittitas County.

Location	mi	km	Destinations	Notes
Cle Elum	0.0	0.0	I-90 – Seattle	Western terminus
	0.8	1.3	SR 903 (1st St.)	Western terminus of SR 903 concurrency
	2.8	4.5	SR 10 / SR 903 / SR 970	Eastern terminus of SR 903 concurrency; northern terminus of SR 10/SR 970 concurrency
	3.1	5.0	I-90 / SR 10 / SR 970	Eastern terminus; southern terminus of SR 10/SR 970 concurrency
1.000 mi = 1.609 km; 1.000 km = 0.621 mi: Concurrency terminus

=== Ellensburg loop ===
Interstate 90 Business
- Location: Ellensburg, Washington

Interstate 90 Business is a business loop of Interstate 90 in Ellensburg. It starts at a semi-trumpet interchange at exit 106 on I-90 at U.S. Route 97 then passes through a roundabout and continues along West University Way entering downtown. Then, the route heads south as North Main Street and becomes South Main Street after intersecting West First Avenue. Then, the route becomes Canyon Drive after intersecting West Mountain View Avenue, and heads southeast to its southern terminus at a folded-diamond interchange with I-90/US 97 at exit 109.

Major intersections
The entire route is in Kittitas County.

Location	mi	km	Destinations	Notes
Ellensburg	0.0	0.0	I-90 / US 97 (W University Way)	Western terminus; western terminus of US 97 concurrency
	0.5	0.80	US 97	Eastern terminus of US 97 concurrency
	5.2	8.4	I-90 / US 97 – Seattle	Eastern terminus
1.000 mi = 1.609 km; 1.000 km = 0.621 mi: Concurrency terminus

=== Moses Lake loop ===
Interstate 90 Business
- Location: Moses Lake, Washington

Interstate 90 Business is a business loop of Interstate 90 in Moses Lake. It runs from a diamond interchange at exit 176 on I-90 at Washington Route 171 then continues along West Broadway Avenue to South Division Street where it becomes East Broadway Avenue. After South Balsam Street, the street name changes again to South Pioneer Way, only for Route 171 to make a left turn onto a new segment of East Broadway Avenue, while I-90 BL curves from northeast to south-southeast. After East Hill Avenue, the road curves more directly southeast, and later intersects Washington Route 17, which joins the route in a concurrency until finally reaching I-90 at exit 179, which is a diamond interchange with a south to east loop ramp.

=== Ritzville spur ===
Interstate 90 Business
- Historic U.S. Route 10
- Location: Ritzville, Washington

Interstate 90 Business is a business spur (incomplete loop) of Interstate 90 in Ritzville, Washington, running through the city along the former alignment of U.S. Route 10, only connecting to I-90 at its west end. The business route is also signed with highway shields commemorating historic US 10. Historic US 10 continues east of the Ritzville city line for another 9 miles (15 km) before terminating at Interstate 90.

=== Spokane loop ===
Interstate 90 Business
- Location: Spokane, Washington
- Existed: 2000

Interstate 90 Business was a business loop of Interstate 90 in Spokane, running through the city from west to east. The route began near Spokane International Airport at exit 276, a parclo interchange on Grove Road where it briefly ran northwest, then turned northeastbound along South Geiger Boulevard. Beyond the airport property, I-90 BL ran beneath US 2 with no access, and then turned onto an eastbound only wye interchange with West Sunset Boulevard, which merged as a one-way pair with 3rd Avenue eastbound and 2nd Avenue westbound. At Scott Street, the route left 3rd and 2nd Avenue moved northeast to Sprague Way, then merged onto the bidirectional Sprague Avenue beneath State Route 290 at Pines Road. The business route continued east onto Sprague Avenue until it reached Spokane Valley, terminating at exit 285, which coincidentally is the western terminus of I-90 BL in Spokane Valley.

=== Spokane Valley loop ===
Interstate 90 Business
- Location: Spokane Valley, Washington
- Length: 8.21 mi (13.21 km)
- Existed: May 2013–present

Interstate 90 Business is a business loop of Interstate 90 in Spokane Valley, running through the city from west to east. From its western terminus at exit 285, the route travels eastbound along Appleway Boulevard and westbound Sprague Avenue. The two streets merge onto the bidirectional Sprague Avenue at University Road and intersect State Route 27 at Pines Road. The business route continues northeast onto Appleway Avenue and turns north onto Barker Road in Greenacres, terminating at exit 293.

The business route designation was proposed by businesses and the city government in 2012, along with $60,000 (equivalent to $120,000 in 2024) to fund the installation of signs along Sprague Avenue. The designation was approved by AASHTO in May 2013, and its 18 signs were installed by the city by the end of the year. Sprague Avenue had previously been part of U.S. Route 10, the transcontinental predecessor to I-90, and reached its present width of 62 feet (19 m) in 1949.

== Idaho ==
=== Post Falls loop ===
Interstate 90 Business
- Location: Post Falls, Idaho
- Length: 5.560 mi (8.948 km)

Interstate 90 Business is a business loop of Interstate 90 in Post Falls. The route links I-90, which bypasses downtown Post Falls to the south, and downtown Post Falls, and terminates at I-90 at each end. It begins at I-90 exit 2 in Post Falls. It goes north to Seltice Way. The business loop turns east and follows Seltice Way through downtown. Seltice Way goes under I-90 at exit 6. This interchange is the eastern terminus of I-90 Business (Post Falls). Seltice Way continues east to an intersection with I-90 Business (Coeur d'Alene) at Northwest Blvd.

I-90 Business is a segment of former U.S. Route 10 (US 10) and I-90 alignment through Idaho. US 10 was designated in 1927. US 10 and I-90 entered Idaho on Seltice Way at the Washington-Idaho state border. The highways followed Seltice Way and Northwest Boulevard into Coeur d'Alene. The highways followed Sherman Avenue east through downtown town Coeur d'Alene. Then, the highway turned south and followed Lake Coeur d'Alene Drive and Yellowstone Trail along the shore of Lake Coeur d'Alene to the Coeur d'Alene National Forest. The highway moved to the present I-90 route after the freeway and Veterans Memorial Centennial Bridge was completed in the early 1990s.

=== Coeur d'Alene loop ===
Interstate 90 Business
- Location: Coeur d'Alene, Idaho
- Length: 3.834 mi (6.170 km)

Interstate 90 Business is a business loop of Interstate 90 in Coeur d'Alene. The route links I-90, which bypasses downtown Coeur d'Alene to the north, and downtown Coeur d'Alene. As its Business Loop designation implies, I-90 Business terminates at I-90 at each end. It begins at I-90 exit 11 in Coeur d'Alene. It goes southeast on Northwest Boulevard. I-90 Business intersects Seltice Way (former US 10 & I-90) just south of the freeway. I-90 Business intersects U.S. Route 95 at a diamond interchange just north of the Spokane River. The business loop continues southeast past North Idaho College turns east on Sherman Avenue near a city park, beach, marina, and the Lake Coeur d'Alene Resort. Sherman Avenue carries the I-90 Business through downtown and out to an interchange with I-90 at exit 15. This interchange is the eastern terminus of I-90 Business.

I-90 Business is a segment of former U.S. Route 10 (US 10) and I-90 alignment through Idaho. US 10 was designated in 1927. US 10 and I-90 entered Idaho on Seltice Way at the Washington-Idaho state border. The highways followed Seltice Way and Northwest Boulevard into Coeur d'Alene. The highways followed Sherman Avenue east through downtown town Coeur d'Alene. Then, the highway turned south and followed Lake Coeur d'Alene Drive and Yellowstone Trail along the shore of Lake Coeur d'Alene to the Coeur d'Alene National Forest. The highway moved to the present I-90 route after the freeway and Veterans Memorial Centennial Bridge was completed in the early 1990s.

=== Kellogg loop ===
Interstate 90 Business
- Location: Kellogg, Idaho
- Existed: 2006

Interstate 90 Business was a 1.4-mile (2.3 km) business loop of Interstate 90 in Kellogg. It ran from a diamond interchange at exit 49 north along Bunker Avenue until the intersection with West Cameron Avenue (Old Highway 10), where it turned south onto Division Street and joined its parent route at the eastbound on-ramp for Exit 51 (a diamond interchange with no westbound on-ramp), finally coming to an end.

=== Osburn spur ===
Interstate 90 Business
- Location: Osburn, Idaho
- Length: 1.639 mi (2.638 km)

Interstate 90 Business is 1.6-mile (2.6 km) business spur of Interstate 90 in Osburn. It runs south from a diamond interchange at exit 57 along North Third Street to East Mullan Avenue (former US 10). Originally, the route was part of a loop leading from North Third Street along East Mullan Avenue to Silver Valley Road to Markwell Avenue in Silverton.

=== Silverton spur ===
Interstate 90 Business
- Location: Silverton, Idaho
- Length: 0.119 mi (192 m)

Interstate 90 Business is a 0.12-mile (0.19 km) business spur of Interstate 90 in Silverton. It runs south from a diamond interchange at exit 60 along Markwell Avenue to Silver Valley Road (former US 10), although most of the "business" is located north of that interchange. Originally, the route was part of a loop leading from west from Markwell Avenue along Silver Valley Road into Osburn, where it led to East Mullan Avenue, then turned right onto North Third Street finally ending at exit 58 in Osburn.

=== Wallace loop ===
Interstate 90 Business
- Location: Wallace, Idaho
- Length: 1.243 mi (2.000 km)
- Existed: 1991–present

Interstate 90 Business (also signed as The Harry F. Magnuson Way) is a business loop of Interstate 90 in Wallace. The route links I-90, which goes north of the city, and downtown Wallace. As its Business Loop designation implies, I-90 Business terminates at I-90 at each end. This section of Interstate 90 Business contains what was the last traffic light on a coast-to-coast Interstate highway. It begins at I-90 exit 61 in Wallace. It goes southeast on former U.S. Route 10 and the initial route of I-90. I-90 was rerouted to the freeway in 1991. I-90 Business follows the main road through Wallace. Locally, the route is known as Front Street, 5th Street, and Bank Street. I-90 Business intersects State Highway 4 at an at-grade intersection. This intersection is also the I-90 interchange with Highway 4. I-90 Business terminates at this interchange signed as exit 62.

I-90 Business is a segment of former U.S. Route 10 (US 10) and the original I-90 alignment through Idaho. US 10 was designated in 1927. US 10 became co-signed with I-90 in the 1960s. Eventually, I-90 replaced US 10 in Idaho. When the I-90 freeway opened in 1991, the US 10 alignment became I-90 Business. The intersection of Bank Street (US 10, I-90) and Seventh Street was the last traffic light located on a coast-to-coast Interstate highway. It was one of the last, if not the last, removed from a primary Interstate highway. It is the only traffic signal in Wallace and was put into flash mode when the new I-90 viaduct opened.

I-90 Business passes through the Wallace Historic District. In 1979, several blocks of downtown Wallace were listed on the National Register of Historic Places as a historic district. City leaders organized the effort to recognize the historic district to prevent the Federal Highway Administration (FHWA) and Idaho Department of Transportation (IDOT) from condemning and demolishing the city's core to build an at-grade freeway. The FHWA and IDOT designed and built an elevated viaduct to finish the interstate freeway.

=== Mullan loop ===
Interstate 90 Business
- Location: Mullan, Idaho
- Length: 1.0 mi (1.6 km)

Interstate 90 Business is a one-mile (1.6 km) business loop of Interstate 90 in Mullan. It runs from an eastbound only flyunder interchange at exit 68 where it immediately crosses a bridge over the South Fork of the Coeur d'Alene River and runs along River Street, running northeast and parallel to the Trail of the Coeur d'Alenes. After the intersection of 3rd Avenue curves from northeast to east as it runs over a second bridge over the South Fork of the Coeur d'Alene River. The road crosses over the river a third time after the intersection with Copper Street. After the intersection with Eighth Avenue, the route makes a reverse curve to the left and becomes Friday Avenue, where it passes by a small connecting road to Earle Street in front of a high school football field. While Friday Avenue continues east towards national and local parkland, as well as some mining areas, BL 90 turns south onto Atlas Road and crosses the last bridge over the Coeur d'Alene South Fork to end at a diamond interchange for exit 69.

== Montana ==
=== Alberton loop ===
Interstate 90 Business
- Location: Alberton, Montana
- Length: 2.5337 mi (4.0776 km)

Interstate 90 Business is a business loop of Interstate 90 in Alberton. It runs from a diamond interchange at exit 75 on I-90 at Railroad Avenue, then to Adams Street, and finally to another diamond interchange with Petty Creek Road (S-507) at exit 77.

=== Missoula loop ===
Interstate 90 Business
- Location: Missoula, Montana
- Length: 4.8200 mi (7.7570 km)

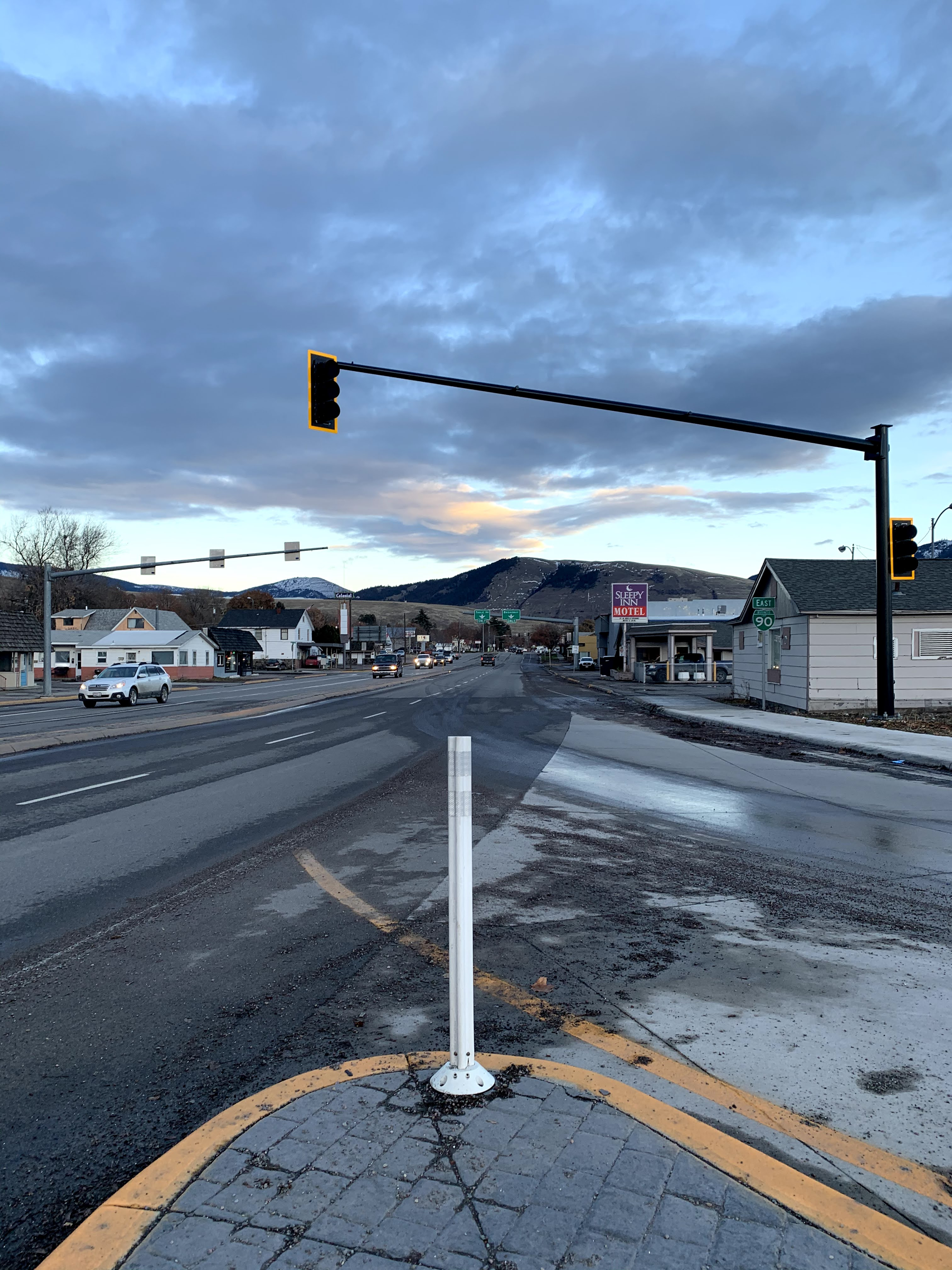
I-90 Business in Missoula

Interstate 90 Business is a business loop of Interstate 90 in Missoula. The business route begins at a diamond interchange with I-90/MT 200 at exit 101 (Reserve Street), which is also the eastern terminus of the overlap with U.S. Route 93. As it crosses over a railroad bridge, it immediately leaves US 93 at an interchange with West Broadway Street, and turns southeast. I-90 BL briefly parallels the south side of the former Northern Pacific Railway line but turns away at the intersection with Railroad Street West, still remaining in a relative southeast trajectory. The road briefly turns straight east before the intersection with North Russell Street, but returns southeast at Toole Street. Between Hawthorne and McCormick Streets, it runs directly along the north bank of the Clark Fork River before reaching the Heart of Missoula. At Higgins Avenue, West Broadway Street becomes East Broadway Street, and at Madison Street, the route is joined by another concurrency with U.S. Route 12. I-90 BL/US 12 run along East Broadway Street together for three blocks until it reaches Van Buren Street, where they both turn north, and run under a bridge for that same NP line it encountered under Reserve Street, and I-90 BL finally ends at a diamond interchange with I-90/MT 200 at exit 105, while US 12 continues east along an overlap with I-90 until it reaches exit 174 in Garrison.

Major intersections

The entire route is in Missoula, Missoula County.

mi	km	Destinations	Notes
0.0000	0.0000	I-90 / US 93 north / MT 200 – Coeur d'Alene, Butte	I-90 exit 101; I-90 BL western terminus; western end of US 93 concurrency; continues as Grant Creek Road
1.0248	1.6493	US 93 south / West Broadway	Eastern end US 93 concurrency
3.8243	6.1546	Orange Street (US 93 Bus.)	
4.0479	6.5145	Higgens Avenue (US 12 Bus. west)	Western end of US 12 Bus. concurrency
4.4146	7.1046	Madison Street (US 12 west) / US 12 Bus. ends	US 12 Bus. eastern terminus; eastern end of US 12 Bus. concurrency; western end of US 12 concurrency
4.8200	7.7570	I-90 / US 12 east / MT 200 – Coeur d'Alene, Butte	I-90 exit 105; I-90 BL eastern terminus; eastern end of US 12 concurrency; continues as Van Buren Street
1.000 mi = 1.609 km; 1.000 km = 0.621 mi: Concurrency terminus

=== Deer Lodge loop ===
Interstate 90 Business
- Location: Deer Lodge, Montana
- Length: 3.0450 mi (4.9005 km)

Interstate 90 Business is a business loop of Interstate 90 in Deer Lodge. It runs from a diamond interchange at exit 184 on I-90 at "North Interchange" and Sam Beck Road to Main Street and a flyover interchange at exit 187. That exit has no westbound entrance ramps.

=== Butte loop ===
Interstate 90 Business
- Location: Butte, Montana
- Length: 5.2606 mi (8.4661 km)

Interstate 90 Business is a business loop of Interstate 90 in Butte. It runs from a flyover interchange at exit 124 on the Interstate 15/90 concurrency at Interstate 115, to a partial cloverleaf interchange with I-15/90 at exit 127. Besides I-115, I-90 BL is also fully concurrent with Interstate 15 Business (I-15 BL) and partially concurrent with Montana Highway 2 (MT 2).

Interstate 90 Business begins at the interchange with exit 124 on I-15/I-90 along I-115 and I-15 BL. After the interchange with South Excelsior Avenue, I-115 ends at an intersection with a local road named Clark Street and I-15/90 BL continues along West Iron Street, as a four-lane divided highway. At the intersection of Montana Street, I-15/90 BL make a left turn, while West Iron Street continues east onto a disjointed intersection as a local two-lane street. The route run along Montana Street until the intersection with West Park Street, which is a local two-lane street and the official terminus of MT 2, which follows I-15/90 BL as an unsigned concurrency. At Main Street, West Park Street becomes East Park Street. Two and a half blocks after this it intersects Arizona Street and Avenue and turns south onto Arizona Avenue, which makes a sharp turn to the southeast at Curtis Street. Just before the intersection with East Platinum Street, the routes veer off to the right onto Utah Avenue. Four blocks south of there, it crosses a Great Northern Railroad line, one block west of the former GN Depot.

Utah Avenue ends at East Front Street across from a former Northern Pacific Railroad depot and I-15/90 BL makes a left turn there. At the intersection with Atlantic Street, East Front Street then curves to the southeast to run under a bridge beneath the former Northern Pacific Railroad line becoming Harrison Avenue. The westbound route has a sign above the bridge for the welcoming motorists to the Butte National Historic Landmark District, but both sides have signs for the former Burlington Northern Railroad. The first notable site along the way is the Greyhound Bus station and Greyhound Package Express office, right next to the tracks and across from the Butte Civics Center. Other sites along the way include the former Harrison Avenue Theater, and the NRHP-listed Socialist Hall. At Massachusetts Avenue, the routes turn straight south, and then ends at a partial cloverleaf with I-15/90, while Harrison Avenue continues as MT 2.

Major intersections

The entire route is in Butte, Silver Bow County.

mi	km	Exit	Destinations	Notes
0.0000	0.0000	–	I-15 south / I-90 west / I-115 begins – Idaho Falls, Missoula	I-15 exit 124; I-115/I-15 BL southern terminus; I-90 BL western terminus; western end of I-115 concurrency; northbound (eastbound) exit and southbound (westbound) entrance
1.1975	1.9272	1	I-115 ends / Excelsior Avenue	I-115 northern terminus; eastern end of I-115 concurrency; becomes Iron Street
1.7359	2.7937		Montana Street / Iron Street	Unsigned I-15 BL/I-90 BL alternate to I-15/I-90 (exit 126); I-15 BL/I-90 BL follow Montana Street
2.3322	3.7533		Park Street / Montana Street / MT 2 begins	Western end of MT 2 concurrency (unsigned); I-15 BL/I-90 BL follow Park Street
5.2606	8.4661		I-15 / I-90 MT 2 east (Harrison Avenue)	I-15 exit 127; I-15 BL northern terminus; I-90 BL eastern terminus; MT 2 becomes signed and continues
1.000 mi = 1.609 km; 1.000 km = 0.621 mi: Concurrency terminus; Incomplete access

=== Bozeman loop ===
Interstate 90 Business
- Location: Bozeman, Montana
- Length: 1.8151 mi (2.9211 km)

Interstate 90 Business is a business loop of Interstate 90 in Bozeman. It runs from a diamond interchange at exit 306 on I-90 at North Seventh Street to an oddly-designed trumpet interchange with US 191 at exit 309. US 191 joins a concurrency with I-90 east of that point.

=== Livingston loop ===
Interstate 90 Business
- Location: Livingston, Montana
- Length: 4.0717 mi (6.5528 km)

Interstate 90 Business is a business loop of Interstate 90 in Livingston. It runs from a diamond interchange at exit 330 on I-90 at old Highway 10 West to a pair of right-on/right-off interchange with US 89 at exit 337. US 89 joins a concurrency with I-90 east of that point.

=== Big Timber loop ===
Interstate 90 Business
- Location: Big Timber, Montana
- Length: 3.5861 mi (5.7713 km)

Interstate 90 Business is a business loop of Interstate 90 in Big Timber. It runs from a diamond interchange at exit 367 on I-90 at the east end of an overlap with US 191. I-90 BL/US 191 run northeast into downtown Big Timber along West First Avenue. At McLeod Street (S-298) West First Avenue becomes East First Avenue. Then after the intersection with Bramble Street, US 191 continues northeast, while I-90 BL curves southeast onto Big Timber Loop Road (Old U.S. 10). After leaving the heart of the city, it passes by the River Rocks Campground on the foot of a bridge over the Boulder River, then the Overland Golf Course. Winding northeast around a former segment of the road still used by local farmers, I-90 BL finally turns south and ends at a diamond interchange with I-90 at exit 370. Old US 10 continues as a local road east of that point.

=== Laurel loop ===
Interstate 90 Business
- Location: Laurel, Montana

Interstate 90 Business is a business loop of Interstate 90 in Laurel. It runs from an eastbound only flyunder interchange at exit 433 on I-90 at old Highway 10 West to a diamond interchange south of Old US 10 at exit 437.

=== Billings loop ===
Interstate 90 Business
- Location: Billings, Montana
- Length: 6.2963 mi (10.1329 km)

Interstate 90 Business is a business loop of Interstate 90 in Billings. It runs from a trumpet interchange at eastbound exit 446 and runs along Laurel Road, Montana Avenue and First Avenue North, in a one way pair between Division Street and 18th Street. East of 18th Street it continues until it reaches US 87, then runs southeast to a diamond interchange at exit 452.

Major intersections

The entire route is in Yellowstone County.

Location	mi	km	Destinations	Notes
Billings	0.0000– 0.1705	0.0000– 0.2744	I-90 / US 212 – Butte, Sheridan	I-90 exit 446; I-90 BL western terminus
Billings	0.0000– 0.1705	0.0000– 0.2744	King Avenue West (S-532 west) / South Frontage Road	Former S-305
Billings	1.5654	2.5193	First Avenue South (Truck Route)	Eastbound exit and westbound entrance; to State Avenue and 6th Street West
Billings	2.3163	3.7277	Central Avenue to Underpass	Westbound exit and eastbound entrance; to 6th Street West
Billings	3.6104	5.8104	MT 3 (North 27th Street)	
Billings	5.0497	8.1267	US 87 north (Main Street)	Western end of US 87 concurrency
Lockwood	6.2963	10.1329	I-90 / US 87 south / US 212 to I-94 – Butte, Sheridan	I-90 exit 452; I-90 BL eastern terminus; eastern end of US 87 concurrency; continues as Old US 87
1.000 mi = 1.609 km; 1.000 km = 0.621 mi: Concurrency terminus; Incomplete access

=== Hardin loop ===
Interstate 90 Business
- Location: Hardin, Montana
- Length: 2.6722 mi (4.3005 km)

Interstate 90 Business is a business loop of Interstate 90 in Hardin. It runs from a diamond interchange at exit 495 on I-90 at North Crawford Avenue in a two block concurrency with Montana Highway 47 then makes a left turn onto 14th Street West, only to curve south again onto Center Street until it reaches "Old US 87," and makes another left torn to go east. The route runs straight east for under two blocks, then runs northeast along the north side of a railroad line. BL 90 ends at another diamond interchange with I-90 at exit 497.

== Wyoming ==
=== Sheridan loop ===
Interstate 90 Business
- Location: Sheridan, Wyoming
- Length: 4.526 mi (7.284 km)

U.S. Highway 14 Business
- Location: Sheridan, Wyoming
- Length: 4.526 mi (7.284 km)

U.S. Highway 87 Business
- Location: Sheridan, Wyoming
- Length: 4.247 mi (6.835 km)

Interstate 90 Business is a business loop of Interstate 90 in Sheridan. It runs from an incomplete flyunder interchange at exit 20 on I-90 to a diamond interchange with US 14 at exit 25. The route also carries US 14 Business and US 87 Business, as well as a portion of mainline U.S. 87.

BL 90/US 14 Bus./US 87 Bus. begins at exit 20 at I-90 and runs south along Main Street. Along the way it serves as the eastern terminus of WY 337 at Fort Road, intersects the shared termini of WY 330 and WY 336 (both at 5th Street), serves as the eastern terminus of WY 331 further downtown, then leaves Main Street at the northern terminus of WY 332 and branches off to the southeast onto Coffeen Avenue. The road curves south again after a bridge over Little Goose Creek. US 87 Bus. ends at US 87 and WY 334, but US 14 Bus. follows BL 90 and US 87 along East Brundage Lane to I-90 at exit 25.

Major intersections

The entire route is in Sheridan, Sheridan County.

mi	km	Destinations	Notes
0.000	0.000	WYO 338 north (Decker Road) I-90 / US 14 / US 87 – Billings, Buffalo US 14 Bus. begins / US 87 Bus. begins	I-90 exit 20; I-90 BL / US 14 Bus. western terminus; US 87 Bus. northern terminus; western end of US 14 Bus. / US 87 Bus. concurrency; roadway continues as WYO 338
1.683	2.709	WYO 330 west / WYO 336 east (5th Street)	
2.470	3.975	WYO 332 south (South Main Street)	
4.247	6.835	WYO 334 south (East Brundage Lane) US 87 Bus. ends / US 87 south (Coffeen Avenue)	US 87 Bus. southern terminus; eastern end of US 87 Bus. concurrency; western end of US 87 concurrency
4.526	7.284	I-90 / US 14 west / US 87 north – Billings, Buffalo US 14 Bus. ends / US 14 east – Ucross	I-90 exit 20; I-90 BL / US 14 Bus. eastern terminus; eastern end of US 87 concurrency; roadway continues as US 14
1.000 mi = 1.609 km; 1.000 km = 0.621 mi: Concurrency terminus

=== Buffalo loop ===
Interstate 90 Business
- Location: Buffalo, Wyoming
- Length: 3.773 mi (6.072 km)

Interstate 90 Business is a business loop of Interstate 90 in Buffalo. It runs from a half-diamond interchange at exit 56A south along North Main Street along with BL 25 and US 87 Bus. until it reaches US 16 (East Hart Street), and turns left to go east. Right after Bypass Road, which is incorrectly marked by Google Maps as being part of WY 196, BL 90/US 16 passes under Interstate 25 at exit 299 and continues to run straight east until it curves to the northeast at the intersection of TW Road. BL 90 ends at a full diamond interchange at exit 58 on I-90, but US 16 continues to run east towards Ucross.

Major intersections

The entire route is in Johnson County.

Location	mi	km	Destinations	Notes
	0.000	0.000	I-25 BL begins / US 87 Bus. begins / I-90 west / US 87 north – Sheridan	I-90 exit 56A; I-90 BL western terminus; I-25 BL / US 87 Bus. northern terminus; western end of I-25 BL / US 87 Bus. concurrency; westbound entrance and eastbound exit
Buffalo	1.651	2.657	I-25 BL south / US 16 west / US 87 Bus. south (North Main Street)	Eastern end of I-25 BL / US 87 Bus. concurrency; western end of US 16 concurrency
Buffalo	2.246	3.615	I-25 / US 87 – Sheridan, Casper	I-25 exit 299
	3.773	6.072	I-90 – Sheridan, Gillette US 16 east – Ucross	I-90 exit 58; I-90 BL eastern terminus; eastern end of US 16 concurrency; roadway continues as US 16
1.000 mi = 1.609 km; 1.000 km = 0.621 mi: Concurrency terminus; Incomplete access

=== Gillette loop ===
Interstate 90 Business
- Location: Gillette, Wyoming
- Length: 4.967 mi (7.994 km)

Interstate 90 Business is a business loop of Interstate 90 in Gillette. It runs from diamond interchanges at exit 124 and at exit 128. The route also carries the north end of WY 50 and US 14/16. A State of Wyoming "Port of Entry" can be found at the east end of the business loop.

Major intersections

The entire route is in Gillette, Campbell County.

mi	km	Destinations	Notes
0.000	0.000	WYO 50 south (Skyline Drive) I-90 – Buffalo, Moorcroft	I-90 exit 124; I-90 BL western terminus; western end of WYO 50 concurrency; roadway continues as WYO 50
1.844	2.968	WYO 50 ends / US 14 east / US 16 west / WYO 59 north	WYO 50 northern terminus; east end of WYO 50 concurrency; west end of US 14 / US 16 / WYO 59 concurrency
3.645	5.866	WYO 59 south to I-90 – Douglas	East end of WYO 59 concurrency
4.967	7.994	I-90 / US 14 east / US 16 east – Buffalo, Moorcroft WYO 51 east	I-90 exit 128; I-90 BL eastern terminus; eastern end of US 14 / US 16 concurrency; roadway continues as WYO 51
1.000 mi = 1.609 km; 1.000 km = 0.621 mi: Concurrency terminus

=== Moorcroft loop ===
Interstate 90 Business
- Location: Crook County, Wyoming
- Length: 1.648 mi (2.652 km)

Interstate 90 Business is a business loop of Interstate 90 in Crook County. It runs from diamond interchanges at exit 153 and at exit 154. The route also carries the concurrency with US 14 until it reaches Yellowstone Avenue and US 16 until it reaches the Cenex/Coffee Cup Fuel Stop. The western edge of the business loop also serves as the eastern terminus of Wyoming Highway 51.

Major intersections

The entire route is in Crook County.

Location	mi	km	Destinations	Notes
	0.000	0.000	I-90 east – Moorcroft, I‑90 BL I-90 west / US 14 west / US 16 west – Gillette, Buffalo, Sheridan	Western terminus; diamond interchange; I-90 exit 153; western end of US 14 & US 16 concurrency
Moorcroft	0.137	0.220	WYO 51 west – Rozet, Gillette	Eastern end of WYO 51
Moorcroft	1.205	1.939	US 14 east – Pine Haven, Devils Tower Jct	Eastern end of US 14 concurrency
Moorcroft	1.403	2.258	US 16 east – Upton, Newcastle	Eastern end of US 16 concurrency
Moorcroft	1.648	2.652	I-90 east – Sundance, Rapid City SD I-90 west – I‑90 BL	Eastern terminus; diamond interchange; I-90 exit 154
1.000 mi = 1.609 km; 1.000 km = 0.621 mi: Concurrency terminus

=== Sundance loop ===
Interstate 90 Business
- Location: Sundance, Wyoming
- Length: 3.411 mi (5.489 km)

Interstate 90 Business is a 3.411-mile (5.489 km) business loop of Interstate 90 in Sundance. It begins at a diamond interchange at exit 185 on a segment of I-90 that briefly curves to the north-northeast. The business loop overlaps US 14 (West Street) and immediately intersects with the northern terminus of WY 116. The routes curve to towards the northeast passing over Sundance Creek directly east of WY 116, and later run beneath I-90 again, but with no interchange. After passing under the interstate, I-90 BL/US 14 makes another curve at a more northerly angle where it crosses Sundance Creek a second time, then takes a sharp curve from West Street to East Cleveland Street which runs less than several blocks through downtown Sundance until reaching the intersection with Sixth Street and the northern terminus of Wyoming Highway 585.

Two blocks after WY 585, the routes intersect with Eighth Street, whose southeast corner contains Sundance High School followed by Washington Park, which includes the Crook County Fairgrounds. Main Street within Sundance ends across the street from these fairgrounds. The developed area begins to diminish somewhat after this, though it doesn't disappear entirely. Across from a truck stop, BL 90 and US 14 make a sharp right turn while the old US 14 continues east as a frontage road along the north side of I-90, and BL 90 finally ends at another diamond interchange at exit 189, while US 14 joins the interstate in an overlap. A "Port of Entry" can be found at the east end of the Business Loop on the south side of exit 189, along with a small rest area.

Major intersections

The entire route is in Sundance, Crook County.

mi	km	Destinations	Notes
0.000	0.000	US 14 west – Devils Tower I-90 – Moorcroft, Spearfish	I-90 exit 185; I-90 BL western terminus; western end of US 14 concurrency; roadway continues as US 14
0.191	0.307	WYO 116 west – Upton	
1.651	2.657	WYO 585 south (6th Street) – Newcastle	
3.411	5.489	I-90 / US 14 east – Moorcroft, Spearfish	I-90 exit 189; I-90 BL eastern terminus; eastern end of US 14 concurrency
1.000 mi = 1.609 km; 1.000 km = 0.621 mi: Concurrency terminus

== South Dakota ==
=== Spearfish loop ===
Interstate 90 Business
- Location: Spearfish, South Dakota

Interstate 90 Business is a business loop of Interstate 90 in Spearfish. It runs from diamond interchanges at exit 10 and at exit 14. The route includes streets such as North Avenue, North Main Street, East Colorado Boulevard, and North 27th Street. It also carries part of US 14A along East Colorado Boulevard into exit 14.

=== Sturgis loop ===
Interstate 90 Business
- Location: Sturgis, South Dakota

Interstate 90 Business is a business loop of Interstate 90 in Sturgis. It runs from a diamond interchange at exit 30 at the east end of U.S. Route 14A The route includes streets such as Lazelle Street (SD 34/79) and Junction Boulevard at another diamond interchange at exit 32.

=== Rapid City loop ===
Interstate 90 Business
- Location: Rapid City, South Dakota

Interstate 90 Business is a business loop of Interstate 90 in Rapid City. It runs from a diamond interchange at exit 52 (Peaceful Pines Road) in Black Hawk, then runs along the southeast side of I-90 on SD 231 (Sturgis Road), gradually moving away from that side of the interstate. Just before the intersection with Merritt Road, BL 90/SD 231 crosses the Meade-Pennington County Line. Within the Rapid City Limits, the concurrency with SD 231 ends at the intersection with West Chicago Street, and then it curves east onto West Main Street before it intersects SD 44 (Mountain View Road). In Downtown Rapid City, the route becomes a one-way pair which includes a brief two block overlap with US 16 until the intersections with East Street, where they turn north and intersect SD 44 a second time. Curving to the east at a railroad track, the road's name is changed to East North Street, then curves to the northeast at the intersection of North Campbell Street and finally terminates at a SPUI interchange with I-90 at exit 60. North of that interchange, East North Road becomes Tish Boulevard, a street within an unfinished industrial development leading to a city firehouse before becoming a dead end at a private one-lane dirt road.

=== Wall loop ===
Interstate 90 Business
- Location: Wall, South Dakota

Interstate 90 Business is a business loop of Interstate 90 in Wall. It begins at a diamond interchange at exit 109 at Airport Road (signed as West 4th Avenue). Less than one block after the interchange, BL 90 veers off to the right onto South Boulevard (former US 14 and 16), running southeast, while Airport Road turns into West Fourth Avenue after a landing strip and heads towards the famous Wall Drug Store and other local tourist attractions. South Boulevard passes a local high school before becoming a divided highway and crossing the former Chicago and Northwestern Railway line. East of that line, the route is diverted onto two bi-directional frontage roads that once flanked the former US 14/16. At Glen Street BL 90 turns south at the corner of a museum dedicated to the Battle of Wounded Knee, ending one block later at exit 110, which is also shared by the western terminus of South Dakota Highway 240.

=== Kadoka loop ===
Interstate 90 Business
- Location: Kadoka, South Dakota
- Existed: 1964–present

Interstate 90 Business is a business loop of Interstate 90 in Kadoka. It runs from a diamond interchange at exit 150 at the end of the overlap with South Dakota Highway 73, then makes a left turn onto South Dakota Highway 248. The road runs east for one block, then turns northeast away from Maple Street (Old Highway 16), as it runs along the northern edge of the city. After a second intersection with Old Highway 16, BL 90/SD 248 continues the same trajectory, albeit with less developed surroundings. Just as SD 248 starts to curve to the east, BL 90 leaves the overlap turning north onto South Creek Road and finally terminates at a diamond interchange with I-90 at exit 152. Only the Badlands Truckstop can be found north of the exit 152 interchange.

The Kadoka loop was approved by the South Dakota State Highway Commission in July 1974.

=== Former Belvidere spur ===
Interstate 90 Business
- Location: Belvidere, South Dakota

Interstate 90 Business is a former business spur of Interstate 90 in Belvidere. It ran from a diamond interchanges at exit 163 at the west end of an overlap with South Dakota Highway 63. The route overlapped southbound SD 63 for 1.1 miles (1.8 km), but partially due to the fact that the community served by the route has a population that is consistently in the double digits, it was decommissioned in 2009.

=== Murdo loop ===
Interstate 90 Business
- Location: Murdo, South Dakota
- Existed: 1964–present

Interstate 90 Business is a business loop of Interstate 90 in Murdo. It runs from a diamond interchange at exit 191, then follows Fifth Avenue (South Dakota Highway 248), passing by sites such as the Pioneer Auto Museum. At a blinker-light intersection with Kennedy Avenue, BL 90 leave its concurrency with SD 248 and turns south and turns south onto Willow Street before ending at another diamond interchange with exit 192 on I-90, which is also shared with the western terminus of a concurrency with U.S. Route 83.

The Murdo loop was approved by the South Dakota State Highway Commission in July 1974.

=== Former Vivian loop ===
Interstate 90 Business
- Location: Vivian, South Dakota

Interstate 90 Business is a former business loop of Interstate 90 in Vivian. The route began at a diamond interchange at exit 212, at the east end of the overlap with US 83, and northern terminus of South Dakota Highway 53. It ran north, overlapping US 83 until the nearby intersection with South Dakota Highway 248, then turned east overlapping that route until it reached 293rd Avenue. From there, it ran south until finally terminating at I-90 at exit 214, another diamond interchange.

=== Presho loop ===
Interstate 90 Business
- Location: Presho, South Dakota

Interstate 90 Business is a business loop of Interstate 90 in Presho. It runs from a diamond interchange at exit 225 and at exit 226. The route includes streets such as 305th Avenue, then turns east onto South Dakota Highway 248, and finally turns south onto Willow Street before ending at another diamond interchange with exit 226 on I-90, at the northern terminus of U.S. Route 183.

=== Oacoma–Chamberlain loop ===
Interstate 90 Business
- Location: Oacoma–Chamberlain, South Dakota

Interstate 90 Business is a business loop of Interstate 90 between Oacoma and Chamberlain, South Dakota. It runs from diamond interchanges at exit 260 in Oacoma and at exit 265 in Chamberlin along a former segment of U.S. Route 16, and includes the Chamberlain Bridge over the Missouri River. Within Chamberlain, it is also overlapped by South Dakota Highway 50.

=== White Lake spur ===
Interstate 90 Business
- Location: White Lake, South Dakota

Interstate 90 Business is a 0.5-mile (0.80 km) business spur of Interstate 90 in White Lake. It runs from a diamond interchanges at exit 296 north along 374th Street (South Main Street) until the intersection with Aurora CR 34 (Old Highway 16).

=== Former Plankinton loop ===
Interstate 90 Business
- Location: Plankinton, South Dakota

Interstate 90 Business was a 2.6 miles (4.2 km) business loop of Interstate 90 in Plankinton. It ran from a diamond interchange at exit 308 north along Aurora CR 35 (386th Avenue/South Main Street) until the intersection with Aurora CR 34 (Old Highway 16). Unlike in White Lake, however, this business route turned right along Old Highway 16 and followed it until the intersection of US 281, where it turned south, overlapping that route until another diamond interchange with I-90 at exit 310, where it finally terminated.

=== Mitchell loop ===
Interstate 90 Business
- Location: Mitchell, South Dakota

Interstate 90 Business is a business loop of Interstate 90 in Mitchell. It runs from a diamond interchange at exit 330 and includes a concurrency with South Dakota Highway 37 along Ohlman Street, then turns right onto West Havens Avenue. West Havens Avenue becomes East Havens Street at Main Street, and then turns south at the intersection with South Burr Street while East Havens Street becomes South Dakota Highway 38. The road curves from south to southeast and becomes a divided highway with frontage roads from the intersection with Kay Street. One block after the frontage roads end, BL 90 not only ends at exit 332, but is replaced by SD 37 which is also the eastern terminus of an overlap with I-90.

=== Sioux Falls spur ===
Interstate 90 Downtown
- Location: Sioux Falls, South Dakota

Interstate 90 Downtown (formerly Interstate 90 Business) is a locally maintained business spur of Interstate 90 in Sioux Falls. It runs south from a SPUI interchange at exit 399 and it overlapped by South Dakota Highway 115 on Cliff Avenue, East Benson Road and North Minnesota Avenue until it reaches 10th Street and 11th Street, terminating at BS 29 and BL 229, both of which overlap South Dakota Highway 42. BL 229 continues south along SD 115 to I-229 at exit 3.

== Minnesota ==
=== Worthington loop ===
Interstate 90 Business
- Location: Worthington, Minnesota

Interstate 90 Business is a 3.2-mile (5.1 km) business loop of Interstate 90 in Worthington. It runs from exit 42 on CSAH 25 (Diagonal Road) then turns left onto CSAH 35 (Oxford Street) to head east. At Humiston Avenue BL 90 is joined by a concurrency with southbound US 59. BL 90 and US 59 continue to run east until they reach a traffic circle where US 59 turns south and BL 90/Oxford Street turn northeast along Minnesota State Highway 60. BL 90 ends at exit 45 on US 90, but MN 60 continues toward cities such as Windom, St. James, Mankato, and Wabasha.

=== Fairmont loop ===
Interstate 90 Business
- Location: Fairmont, Minnesota

Interstate 90 Business is a 6.1-mile (9.8 km) business loop of Interstate 90 in Fairmont. It runs from a diamond interchange at exit 99 on I-90 at CSAH 39 to a folded diamond interchange with Minnesota Trunk Highway 15 at exit 102.

Business Loop 90 begins on Interstate 90 at exit 99, the interchange with CSAH 39 (North Bixby Road) and runs south, where it passes through farmland as it encounters the eastern terminus of CSAH 130, and is renamed 190th Avenue. The surroundings become slightly more industrial, as it passes the Martin County Fair just before crossing a former Milwaukee Road railroad line, and then makes a left turn at CSAH 26. While making this transition, the street name for CSAH 26 changes from 120th Street to Lake Avenue. I-90 BL runs directly east until it curves to the southeast, where it briefly runs parallel to the ex-Milwaukee Road Line and both the routes and track cross bridges between George Lake and Sisseton Lake. Immediately after passing by the Martin County Courthouse, Lake Avenue ends across from the intersection of First Street and North and South Main Streets. BL-40/CSAH 26 runs south along South Main Street for one block before turning east again onto East Blue Earth Avenue where they remain overlapped until BL-40 makes a left turn onto Minnesota Trunk Highway 15, and runs north. BL-40/MN 15 cross the old Milwaukee Road line for the last time and then another one that branches off from this line further west in the city. Between the two crossings frontage roads start to parallel the road until the intersection with Margaret Street (CSAH 132). North of the bridge over Center Creek, Business Loop 90 ends at exit 102 on I-90, while Trunk Highway 15 continues north through New Ulm, Hutchinson, and the St. Cloud Area.

=== Austin loop ===
Interstate 90 Business
- Location: Austin, Minnesota

Interstate 90 Business is a 4.2-mile (6.8 km) business loop of Interstate 90 in Austin. It runs from a diamond interchange at exit 175 on I-90 at CSAH 46 (Oakland Avenue West), and runs directly east with Minnesota Trunk Highway 105. Most of this segment of the road is flanked by local service roads, except at the bridge over Turtle Creek. After the intersection with 14th Street Northwest (former US 218), the road becomes a one-way pair, and MN 105 turns south onto 12th Street Southwest. Meanwhile, eastbound BL 90 runs along First Avenue Southwest, while westbound BL 90 remains along Oakland Avenue West. At Main Street, First Avenue Southwest and Oakland Avenue West both become First Avenue Southeast and Oakland Avenue East, and the one way pair ends at Fourth Street Southeast, and eastbound BL 90 turns left (north) to rejoin its Oakland Avenue counterpart. BL 90 crosses a bridge over Cedar River where Oakland Avenue East becomes Oakland Place Southeast. After the intersection with 10th Street Northeast it runs beneath a 14-foot (4.3 m) railroad bridge, then curves to the northeast to cross another bridge over Dobbins Creek and run along the east side of East Side Lake. Interstate Business Loop 90 ends at exit 180A on I-90/US 218, the latter of which leaves its concurrency with I-90 at exit 180B.
