= Bighorn Airways =

Airline of the United States

IATA	ICAO	Call sign
-	BHR	BIGHORN AIR
- Founded: 1947
- Hubs: Sheridan County Airport
- Fleet size: 19
- Headquarters: Sheridan, Wyoming, United States
- Website: www.bighornairways.com

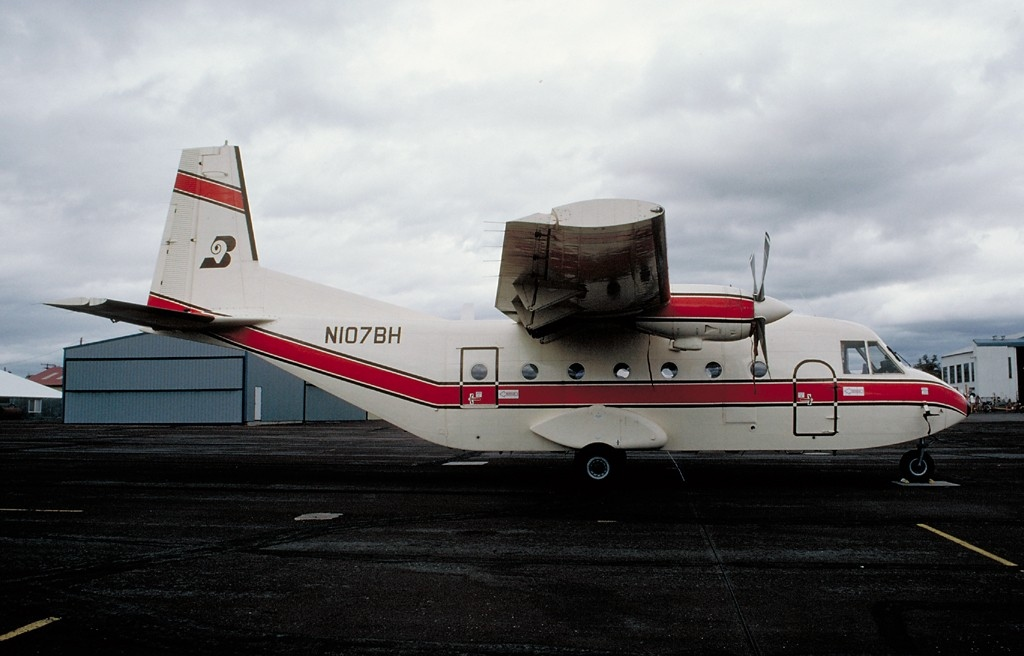
A Bighorn Airways CASA C-212-CC

Bighorn Airways is an American charter company based in Sheridan, Wyoming, United States. It operates domestic charter passenger and cargo services, including contract services. Its main base is Sheridan County Airport.

== History ==
The company was established and started operations in 1947. It is owned by Robert and Christopher Eisele. Bighorn Airways In July 2023, Bighorn Airways entered a purchase agreement to be acquired by Bridger Aerospace.

== Fleet ==
The Bighorn Airways fleet consists of the following aircraft (as of August 2021): Bighorn Airways

- 4 CASA C-212-200 Aviocar
- 5 Dornier 228-200 (as of August 2025)
- 3 De Havilland Canada DHC-8-100 (as of August 2025)
- 2 De Havilland Canada DHC-8-Q200 (as of August 2025)
- 2 Cessna 340
- 1 Cessna CitationJet
- 1 Cessna 180
- 1 Piper PA-18 Supercub
