= Wyoming Highway 330 =

State highway in Wyoming, United States

Wyoming Highway 330
- West Fifth Street
- WYO 330 highlighted in red

Route information
- Maintained by WYDOT
- Length: 3.30 mi (5.31 km)

Major junctions
- West end: CR 74 west of Sheridan
- East end: I-90 BL / US 14 / US 87 / WYO 336 in Sheridan

Location
- Country: United States
- State: Wyoming
- Counties: Sheridan

Highway system
- Wyoming State Highway System; Interstate; US; State
← WYO 322	→ WYO 331

Wyoming Highway 330 (WYO 330) is a fairly short 3.30-mile (5.31 km) east-west state highway in central Sheridan County, Wyoming, United States, that serves the northwestern part of Sheridan.

== Route description ==
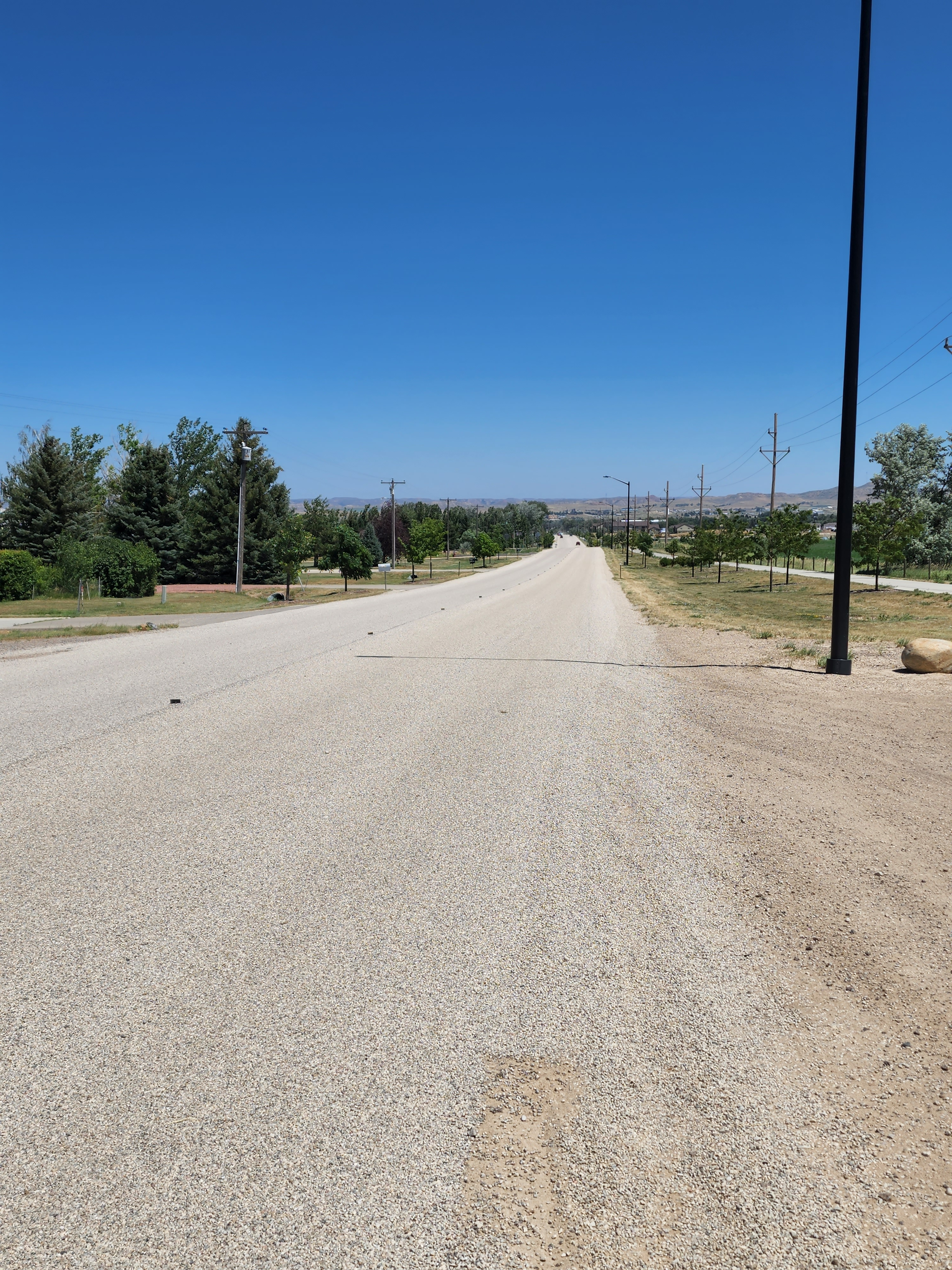
View eastbound from its western terminus

WYO 330 starts its western end just west of Sheridan at Sheridan County Route 74 (Soldier Creek Road). WYO 330 heads east into Sheridan changing to West Fifth Street, and passes north of the Sheridan Country Club and Rotary Park before passing south of Sheridan Memorial Hospital half-way through its route. WYO 330 crosses Big Goose Creek before ending at an intersection with I-90 Business/US 14 Business/US 87 Business (N. Main Street) and the western terminus of Wyoming Highway 336 (E. Fifth Street).

== History ==
WYO 330 was originally designated in Sweetwater and Carbon counties on the routing of present-day WYO 789 between Creston Junction and Baggs before the multi-state US 789 was implemented (and subsequently retracted).

== Major intersections ==
The entire route is in Sheridan County.

Location	mi	km	Destinations	Notes
	0.00	0.00	CR 74 west (Soldier Creek Road)	Western terminus
Sheridan	3.30	5.31	I-90 BL / US 14 / US 87 north I-90 BL / US 14 / US 87 south	Eastern terminus
Sheridan	3.30	5.31	WYO 336 east	Continuation east beyond eastern terminus
1.000 mi = 1.609 km; 1.000 km = 0.621 mi

== See also ==
- List of state highways in Wyoming
