= List of highways numbered 343 =

The following highways are numbered 343:

== Australia ==
- Local Bendigo Highway

== Canada ==
- Manitoba Provincial Road 343
- Newfoundland and Labrador Route 343
- Prince Edward Island Route 343
- Quebec Route 343
- Saskatchewan Highway 343

== Japan ==
- Japan National Route 343

== Nigeria ==
- A343 highway (Nigeria)

== United States ==
- Connecticut Route 343
- County Road 343 (Levy County, Florida)
- Georgia State Route 343 (former)
- Louisiana Highway 343
- Maryland Route 343
- M-343 (Michigan highway)
- New York:
  - New York State Route 343
  - County Route 343 (Erie County, New York)
- North Carolina Highway 343
- Ohio State Route 343
- Pennsylvania Route 343
- Puerto Rico Highway 343
- Tennessee State Route 343
- Texas:
  - Texas State Highway 343 (former)
  - Texas State Highway Loop 343
- Virginia State Route 343
- Wyoming Highway 343

Preceded by 342	Lists of highways 343	Succeeded by 344
