= Wyoming Highway 335 =

State highway in Wyoming, United States

Wyoming Highway 335
- WYO 335 highlighted in red

Route information
- Maintained by WYDOT
- Length: 9.71 mi (15.63 km)

Major junctions
- South end: CR 26 southwest of Big Horn
- North end: US 87 / WYO 332 south of Sheridan

Location
- Country: United States
- State: Wyoming
- Counties: Sheridan

Highway system
- Wyoming State Highway System; Interstate; US; State
← WYO 334	→ WYO 336

Wyoming Highway 335 (WYO 335) is a 9.71-mile-long (15.63 km) roughly north–south Wyoming State Road located in central Sheridan County south of the city of Sheridan.

== Route description ==
Wyoming Highway 335 begins its southern end at Sheridan County Route 26 (Red Grade Road) near the Bighorn National Forest and southwest of the unincorporated community and census-designated place (CDP) of Big Horn. Highway 335 heads east for just over 3 miles before turning due north for another 2.4 miles where WYO 335 has an intersection with Sheridan County Route 87 (Beaver Creek Road) as it curves back east to serve the community of Big Horn. After passing through Big Horn WYO 335 turns, again back north toward Sheridan as it passes the Powder Horn Golf Club. One last time, 335 gently curves northeast and ends at U.S. Route 87 and the southern terminus of Wyoming Highway 332 (Big Horn Avenue) after 9.71 miles south of Sheridan.

== Major intersections ==
The entire route is in Sheridan County.

Location	mi	km	Destinations	Notes
	0.00	0.00	CR 26 (Red Grade Road)	Continuation beyond southern terminus
	9.71	15.63	US 87 / WYO 332	Southern terminus WYO 332
1.000 mi = 1.609 km; 1.000 km = 0.621 mi

== See also ==
- List of state highways in Wyoming
- List of highways numbered 335\
