= List of highways numbered 342 =

The following highways are numbered 342:

== Australia ==
- Lockington Road

== Canada ==
- Manitoba Provincial Road 342
- Newfoundland and Labrador Route 342
- Prince Edward Island Route 342
- Quebec Route 342
- Saskatchewan Highway 342

== Japan ==
- Japan National Route 342

== Nigeria ==
- A342 highway (Nigeria)

== United Kingdom ==
- A342 road, Chippenham, Wiltshire to Andover, Hampshire

== United States ==
- Arkansas Highway 342
- Florida:
  - County Road 342 (Gilchrist County, Florida)
  - County Road 342 (Leon County, Florida)
- Georgia State Route 342 (former)
- Indiana State Road 342
- Louisiana Highway 342
- Maryland Route 342
- Nevada State Route 342
- New York:
  - New York State Route 342
    - New York State Route 342 (former)
- Ohio State Route 342
- Puerto Rico Highway 342
- Tennessee State Route 342
- Texas:
  - Texas State Highway 342
  - Texas State Highway Spur 342
- Virginia State Route 342
- Wyoming Highway 342

Preceded by 341	Lists of highways 342	Succeeded by 343
