= Wyoming Highway 334 =

State highway in Wyoming, United States

== Route Attractions ==
Wyoming Highway 334 connects with the South Park Recreation Area bordering the Little Goose Creek. The road also contains commercial enterprises such as franchise of The Home Depot, and borders a shopping center containing a Great Clips and a Jimmy John's.

Wyoming Highway 334
- East Brundage Lane
- WYO 334 highlighted in red

Route information
- Maintained by WYDOT
- Length: 0.74 mi (1,190 m)

Major junctions
- South end: WYO 332 in Sheridan
- North end: I-90 BL / US 14 Bus. / US 87 Bus. in Sheridan

Location
- Country: United States
- State: Wyoming
- Counties: Sheridan

Highway system
- Wyoming State Highway System; Interstate; US; State
← WYO 333	→ WYO 335

== Route description ==
Wyoming Highway 334 begins its western end at Wyoming Highway 332 (Big Horn Avenue) and travels east for just under eight-tenths of a mile to end at an intersection with I-90 BUS/US 14 BUS/US 87 BUS. Exit 25 of Interstate 90 can be reached by continuing east along I-90 BUS/US 14 BUS/US 87 BUS another 0.3-mile (0.5 km).

The roadway itself continues west of WYO 332 as Sheridan County Route 34 to connect to Wyoming Highway 333 (Airport Road) and the Sheridan County Airport.

== Major intersections ==
The entire route is in Sheridan, Sheridan County.

mi	km	Destinations	Notes
0.00	0.00	WYO 332	Western terminus of WYO 334
0.74	1.19	I-90 BL / US 14 Bus. / US 87 Bus.	Eastern terminus of WYO 334
1.000 mi = 1.609 km; 1.000 km = 0.621 mi
