= List of highways numbered 335 =

The following highways are numbered 335:

== Canada ==
- New Brunswick Route 335
- Newfoundland and Labrador Route 335
- Nova Scotia Route 335
- Quebec Route 335
- Prince Edward Island Route 335
- Saskatchewan Highway 335

== Costa Rica ==
- National Route 335

== India ==
- National Highway 335 (India)

== Japan ==
- Japan National Route 335

== United States ==
- Interstate 335
- County Road 335 (Levy County, Florida)
- Arkansas Highway 335
- Georgia State Route 335
- Indiana State Road 335
- Kentucky Route 335
- Maryland Route 335
- New York:
  - New York State Route 335
  - County Route 335 (Erie County, New York)
- Ohio State Route 335
- Oregon Route 335
- Puerto Rico Highway 335
- Tennessee State Route 335
- Texas:
  - Texas State Highway 335
  - Texas State Highway Loop 335
- Virginia State Route 335
- Wyoming Highway 335

Preceded by 334	Lists of highways 335	Succeeded by 336
