= New York State Route 338 =

New York State Route 338 may refer to:

- New York State Route 338 (1930s) in Allegany and Steuben Counties, from Whitesville southeast to Pennsylvania
- New York State Route 338 (1940s–1980) in Saratoga County
- New York State Route 338 (1980–1996) in Washington County
