= New York State Route 337 (disambiguation) =

New York State Route 337 is a north–south state highway in Schenectady County, New York, United States, that was established in 1980.

New York State Route 337 may also refer to:

- New York State Route 337 (1930–1933) in Onondaga County
- New York State Route 337 (1935–1972) in Lewis County
