= Wyoming Highway 337 =

State highway in Sheridan County, Wyoming, United States

Wyoming Highway 337
- Fort Road
- WYO 337 highlighted in red

Route information
- Maintained by WYDOT
- Length: 1.54 mi (2.48 km)

Major junctions
- West end: Sheridan Veterans Administration Medical Center northwest of Sheridan
- East end: I-90 BL / US 14 / US 87 in Sheridan

Location
- Country: United States
- State: Wyoming
- Counties: Sheridan

Highway system
- Wyoming State Highway System; Interstate; US; State
← WYO 336	→ WYO 338

Wyoming Highway 337 (WYO 337), also known as Fort Road, is a 1.54-mile (2.48 km) east-west state highway in Sheridan County, Wyoming, United States, that connects the Sheridan Veterans Administration Medical Center (northwest of Sheridan) with Interstate 90 Business Loop/U.S. Route 14/U.S. Route 87 (I-90 BL/US 14/US 87, North Main Street) in Sheridan.

== Route description ==
WYO 337 serves the Sheridan VA Medical Center, which is located at the site of the former Fort Mackenzie.

WYO 337 begins at the southeast corner of the VA Hospital Campus at the intersection of Freedom Lane/Army Lane and Navy Lane. (Freedom lane heads west along the southern edge of campus and Army Layne heads north along the east edge of campus, while Navy Lane continues northwest through the main part of campus.) From its western terminus, WYO 337 heads southeast for about 0.7 miles (1.1 km) before turning easterly. After continuing easterly for approximately one-half mile (0.80 km) and connecting with the southern end of Industrial Road along the way, WYO 337 enters the city limits of Sheridan. Very shortly after entering the city, WYO 337 connect with the north end of Dana Avenue (Sheridan County Road 80) and then crosses over Big Goose Creek. The highway then connects with the north end of Frackelton Street (which runs about four blocks south to end at Thorne-Rider Park). After connecting with the north end of Val Vista Street, WYO 337 reaches its eastern terminus at North Main Street (I-90 Bus/US 14/US 87) at T intersection, roughly 0.4 miles (0.64 km) after entering Sheridan. (From WYO 337's eastern terminus I-90 BL/US 14/US 87 heads north toward an interchange with Interstate 90 and Wyoming Highway 338, and then on to Ranchester and Billings, Montana. I-90 BL/US 14/US 87 heads south, through Sheridan, toward Banner, Ucross, and Buffalo.)

== Major intersections ==
The entire route is in Sheridan County.

Location	mi	km	Destinations	Notes
	0.00	0.00	Navy Lane (northwest)	Continuation north beyond western terminus
	0.00	0.00	Freedom Lane (west)/Army Lane (north)	Western terminus
Sheridan	1.54	2.48	I-90 BL / US 14 / US 87 north – I-90 & WYO 338, Ranchester, Billings (Montana) I-90 BL / US 14 / US 87 south – Banner, Ucross, Buffalo	Eastern terminus; T intersection
1.000 mi = 1.609 km; 1.000 km = 0.621 mi

== See also ==
- List of state highways in Wyoming
