= Ohio State Route 333 =

State Route 333

Route information
- Maintained by ODOT

Location
- Country: United States
- State: Ohio

Highway system
- Ohio State Highway System; Interstate; US; State; Scenic
| ← SR 332 | → SR 334 |

In Ohio, State Route 333 may refer to:

- Ohio State Route 333 (1930s), now part of SR 152
- Ohio State Route 333 (1946–1962), Holland Sylvania Road north of US 20
