= Wyoming Highway 339 =

State highway in Wyoming, United States

Wyoming Highway 339
- Jensick Connector
- WYO 339 highlighted in red

Route information
- Maintained by WYDOT
- Length: 1.02 mi (1.64 km)

Major junctions
- West end: I-90 / US 14 / US 87 northwest of Sheridan
- East end: WYO 338 north of Sheridan

Location
- Country: United States
- State: Wyoming
- Counties: Sheridan

Highway system
- Wyoming State Highway System; Interstate; US; State
← WYO 338	→ WYO 340

Wyoming Highway 339 (WYO 339) is a short 1.02-mile-long (1.64 km) east-west Wyoming State Road located in north-central Sheridan County.

== Route description ==
Wyoming Highway 339 begins its western end at Interstate 90/US 14/US 87 (exit 16) and travels east just over 1 mile to end at Wyoming Highway 338 (Decker Road). WYO 338 travels south to serve Sheridan as well as north to the Montana State Line and Decker, Montana.

The Wyoming Port of Entry is located on the west side of the I-90/WYO 339 (Dietz) interchange and is the only two-state combination Port in Wyoming that issues both Wyoming and Montana permits.

== History ==
The length of Highway 339 between Wyoming Highway 338 and Interstate 90 is the original routing of US 14/US 87 route prior to the construction of Interstate 90.

== Major intersections ==
The entire route is in Sheridan County.

Location	mi	km	Destinations	Notes
	0.00	0.00	I-90 / US 14 / US 87 – Sheridan, Hardin	Exit 16 on I-90
	1.02	1.64	WYO 338	
1.000 mi = 1.609 km; 1.000 km = 0.621 mi
