= Wyoming Highway 336 =

State highway in Sheridan County, Wyoming, United States

Wyoming Highway 336
- WYO 336 highlighted in red

Route information
- Maintained by WYDOT
- Length: 11.52 mi (18.54 km)

Major junctions
- West end: I-90 BL / US 14 Bus. / US 87 Bus. / WYO 330 in Sheridan
- I-90 / US 14 / US 87 east of Sheridan
- East end: CR 42 in Wyarno

Location
- Country: United States
- State: Wyoming
- Counties: Sheridan

Highway system
- Wyoming State Highway System; Interstate; US; State
| ← WYO 335 | → WYO 337 |

Wyoming Highway 336 (WYO 336) is a 11.52-mile (18.54 km) east-west state highway in central Sheridan County, Wyoming, United States, that connects Interstate Business 90 / U.S. Route 14 Business / U.S. Route 87 Business (I-90 BL / US 14 Bus. / US 87 Bus.) in Sheridan with County Road 42 (CR 42) in Wyarno.

== Route description ==
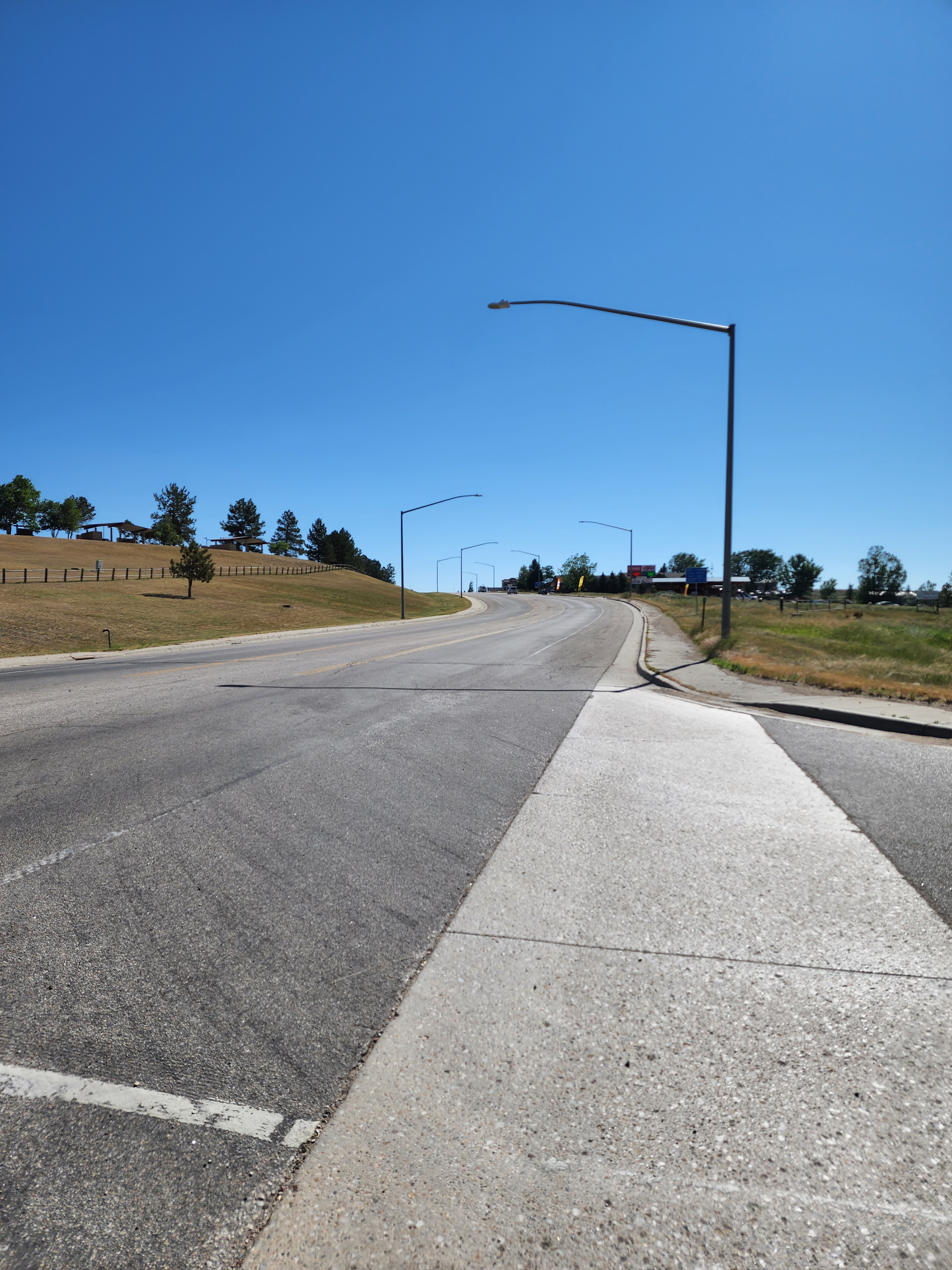
Eastbound WY 336 from just east of I-90 / US 14 / US 87, July 2022

WYO 336 begins at an intersection with the concurrent business routes of I-90, US 14, and US 87 (North Main Street) and the eastern end of Wyoming Highway 330 (West Fifth Street) in Sheridan. From its western terminus WYO 336 heads east along East Fifth Street to leave the city limits of Sheridan, before jogging slightly to the south.

Just under one mile (1.6 km) from its western terminus, WYO 336 connects with Interstate 90 / U.S. Route 14 / U.S. Route 87 (I-90 exit 23) at a diamond interchange. Just over one mile (1.6 km) from the interchange, WYO 336 becomes Wyarno Road and begins gradually turning to the north as part of a long northern arc for the remainder of its route. Approximately 10.2 miles (16.4 km) along its course, WYO 336 arrives at the unincorporated community of Wyarno. On the eastern edge of Wyarno, WYO 336 reaches its eastern Terminus at CR 42 (Ulm Road).

== Major intersections ==
The entire route is in Sheridan County.

| Location | mi | km | Destinations | Notes |
|---|---|---|---|---|
| Sheridan | 0.00 | 0.00 | WYO 330 west | Continuation beyond western terminus; eastern end of WYO 330 |
| Sheridan | 0.00 | 0.00 | I-90 BL east / US 14 Bus. south / US 87 Bus. east (N Main St) – I-90 / US 14 / US 87, Buffalo, Gillette, Casper I-90 BL west / US 14 Bus. north / US 87 Bus. west (N Main St) – I-90 / US 14 / US 87, Ranchester, Billings (Montana) | Western terminus |
| | 0.97 | 1.56 | I-90 east / US 14 south / US 87 east – Buffalo, Gillette, Casper I-90 west / US 14 north / US 87 west – Ranchester, Billings (Montana) | Exit 23 on I-90; diamond interchange |
| Wyarno | 11.52 | 18.54 | CR 42 (Ulm Road) – Ulm | Continuation east beyond eastern terminus |
1.000 mi = 1.609 km; 1.000 km = 0.621 mi trans

== See also ==
- List of state highways in Wyoming
