= Wyoming Highway 338 =

State highway in Wyoming, United States

Wyoming Highway 338
- Decker Road
- WYO 338 highlighted in red

Route information
- Maintained by WYDOT
- Length: 15.03 mi (24.19 km)

Major junctions
- South end: I-90 / I-90 BL / US 14 Bus. / US 87 Bus. in Sheridan
- North end: S-314 at Montana state line

Location
- Country: United States
- State: Wyoming
- Counties: Sheridan

Highway system
- Wyoming State Highway System; Interstate; US; State
← WYO 337	→ WYO 339

Wyoming Highway 338 (WYO 338) is a 15.03-mile-long (24.19 km) north-south Wyoming State Road located in north-central Sheridan County.

== Route description ==
Wyoming Highway 338 begins its southern end in Sheridan at I-90 BUS/US 14 BUS/US 87 BUS (N. Main Street) and exit 20 of Interstate 90, which also carries US 14 and US 87 at this point. Named Decker Road for the Montana community it reaches, WYO 338 travels north along I-90, paralleling it to the east. At approximately 4.2 miles, WYO 338 intersects the eastern terminus of WYO 339 (Jensick Connector) which links Highway 338 with exit 16 of I-90. Past 339, WYO 338 curves due east before turning back north on which it will stay to complete its routing. At 15.03 miles, Wyoming Highway 338 reaches its northern terminus at Montana Secondary Highway 314 at the Montana State Line.

== History ==
The length of Wyoming Highway 338 between its southern terminus and Wyoming Highway 339 is the original routing of US 14/US 87 prior to the construction of Interstate 90.

The highway's southern terminus at I-90 was relocated to a new interchange that opened in August 2017 after a year of construction. It cost $46.4 million to construct and replaced a trumpet interchange that required traffic to loop under I-90.

== Major intersections ==
The entire route is in Sheridan County.

Location	mi	km	Destinations	Notes
Sheridan	0.00	0.00	I-90 / I-90 BL / US 14 Bus. / US 87 Bus.	Exit 20 on I-90
	4.16	6.69	WYO 339 to I-90	Eastern terminus of WYO 339; to Exit 16 on I-90
	15.03	24.19	S-314	Continuation beyond Montana state line
1.000 mi = 1.609 km; 1.000 km = 0.621 mi
