= Sheridan County Airport =

Airport in Wyoming, United States

- IATA: SHR; ICAO: KSHR; FAA LID: SHR

Summary
- Airport type: Public
- Owner: Sheridan County
- Serves: Sheridan, Wyoming
- Elevation AMSL: 4,021 ft (1,226 m)
- Coordinates: 44°46′09″N 106°58′49″W
- Website: SheridanCountyAirport.com

Map
- Location within Wyoming Location within the United States

Runways
Direction	Length		Surface
Direction	ft	m	Surface
15/33	8,301	2,530	Asphalt
6/24	5,039	1,536	Asphalt

Statistics (2018)
- Aircraft operations: 28,656
- Based aircraft: 77
- Source: Federal Aviation Administration

Sheridan County Airport (IATA: SHR, ICAO: KSHR, FAA LID: SHR) is located in Sheridan County, Wyoming, approxiametly two miles southwest of the city of Sheridan, Wyoming. It serves both commercial and general aviation, as well as military aircraft.

Sheridan once again has scheduled passenger airline service with nonstop flights to Denver (DEN). Air service had been subsidized by the federal Essential Air Service program until February 2007, when Big Sky Airlines began providing subsidy free service The Big Sky service was suspended in January 2008 when this air carrier went out of business. Great Lakes Airlines was the only other carrier at Sheridan, but it abruptly ceased all flights on March 31, 2015. Many Sheridan residents were confused regarding the lack of replacement service, believing that service to Sheridan was still subsidized under Essential Air Service. Federal law had been changed in 2012 so that once Sheridan County had left the EAS program, it could not re-enter it and commercial air service to Sheridan is not funded by EAS anymore.

Federal Aviation Administration records say the airport had 17,710 passenger boardings (enplanements) in calendar year 2008, 14,181 in 2009 and 14,146 in 2010. The National Plan of Integrated Airport Systems for 2011–2015 categorized it as a primary commercial service airport (more than 10,000 enplanements per year).

== Facilities ==
Sheridan County Airport covers 1,550 acres (627 ha) at an elevation of 4,021 feet (1,226 m). It has two asphalt runways: 15/33 is 8,301 by 100 feet (2,530 x 30 m) and 6/24 is 5,039 by 75 feet (1,536 x 23 m).

In 2018 the airport had 28,656 aircraft operations, average 79 per day: 95% general aviation, 5% air taxi, and <1% military. 97 aircraft were then based at this airport: 78% single-engine, 19% multi-engine, 1% jet, and 2% helicopter.

Bighorn Airways offers airplane and helicopter charter service and an aircraft repair and installation center.

== Airline and destination ==
Airlines	Destinations
United Express	Denver

SkyWest Airlines, operating as United Express, replaced Key Lime Air service to Denver on January 12, 2020 when the company took over the subsidized air service contract for both Riverton and Sheridan.

== Statistics ==
Busiest domestic routes from SHR (May 2025 – April 2026)
Rank	Airport	Passengers	Carrier
1	Denver, Colorado	31,330	United Express

== Historical airline service ==
Sheridan first received airline service in 1931 when Wyoming Air Service began a route from Denver to Billings, Montana via Cheyenne, Casper, and Sheridan. The carrier changed its name to Inland Airlines in 1938 and was bought by Western Airlines in 1944. Aircraft operated by Western to the airport included Douglas DC-3s and DC-6Bs followed by Lockheed L-188 Electras and Boeing 737-200s, an example being Denver-Cheyenne-Casper-Sheridan-Billings-Great Falls with some Electras continuing to Calgary. In 1966 Western Electras flew Los Angeles-San Diego-Phoenix-Denver-Cheyenne-Casper-Sheridan-Billings. Western was the only airline to operate mainline jets to Sheridan; it dropped Sheridan in 1980. Aspen Airways (United Express) flew BAe 146-100s Sheridan to United Airlines hub in Denver at times in the late 1980s.

One of Western's Boeing 737s that was bound for Sheridan landed at Buffalo instead by mistake on July 31, 1979, while flying Western Airlines flight 44.

Commuter and regional airlines served Sheridan after Western, with flights primarily to Denver, many via Gillette, Wyoming.

- Trans-America Airways in 1976 and 1977 Denver-Cheyenne-Douglas-Casper-Sheridan with Cessna 402s.
- Big Sky Airlines in 1980 Billings-Sheridan-Casper with Cessna 402s and Swearingen Metroliners.
- Air US 1977-1984 Handley Page Jetstreams and Grumman Gulfstream Is.
- Pioneer Airlines in 1981, Beechcraft 99s.
- Frontier Commuter flying for the original Frontier Airlines (1950-1986) October, 1983 to January, 1985; Convair 580s.
- Aspen Airways 1984 to March 1990, Convair 580s and British Aerospace BAe 146-100s. Aspen became a United Express affiliate in September, 1986.
- Pioneer Airlines returned to Sheridan operating Continental Commuter service for Continental Airlines April, 1985 to May 1986; Swearingen Metroliners.
- Continental Express, operated by Rocky Mountain Airways April, 1990 to mid-1991: Beechcraft 1900s and ATR-42s.
- Continental Express operated by Britt Airways mid-1991 to March, 1994: Beechcraft 1900s and ATR-42s.
- Continental Connection operated by GP Express Airlines March, 1994 to January, 1995: Beechcraft 1900s.
- United Express, operated by Mesa Airlines, April, 1990 to May, 1998: Beechcraft 1900s, Embraer EMB-120 Brasilias, and de Havilland Canada DHC-8 Dash 8s.
- United Express, operated by Air Wisconsin June to October 1998: Dornier 328s.
- United Express, operated by Great Lakes Airlines, October 1998 to April 2005: Beechcraft 1900s and Embraer EMB-120 Brasilias. Great Lakes lost their designation as a United Express affiliate in February, 2002 but continued to operate an indirect code-share with United Airlines.
- Big Sky Airlines returned to Sheridan late 2005 to January 2008: Beechcraft 1900D nonstops to Denver and a single flight to Billings.
- Great Lakes Airlines resumed service in May 2007 operating as an independent air carrier flying Beechcraft 1900Ds and Embraer EMB-120 Brasilias. Great Lakes dropped Sheridan in spring 2015 and the airport had no airline service for the next several months.
- Key Lime Air (Denver Air Connection) then began flights to Denver and Riverton in November 2015 using Fairchild Dornier 328JETs. Denver Air Connection began a code-share service with United Airlines in 2018 then ended service to Sheridan in January 2020.
- United Express, operated by SkyWest Airlines, then began service on January 12, 2020 with two daily nonstop flights to Denver using Bombardier CRJ100/200 regional jets.

== See also ==
- List of airports in Wyoming

== Other sources ==
- Essential Air Service documents (Docket OST-1998-3506) from the U.S. Department of Transportation:
  - Order 2005-1-7 (January 10, 2005): selecting Big Sky Transportation Co., d/b/a/ Big Sky Airlines (Big Sky) to provide essential air service with 19-passenger Fairchild Metro III/23 aircraft at Sheridan, Wyoming, for two years. And also directing Great Lakes Aviation, Ltd., to show cause regarding the subsidy rate on an annual basis, for its provision of service from November 1, 2004, until Big Sky Airlines inaugurates essential air service at Sheridan.
  - Order 2006-10-19 (October 31, 2006): vacating Order 2006-10-11, which requested proposals from carriers interested in providing essential air service (EAS) at Sheridan, Wyoming, for a new two-year period, beginning February 1, 2007, with or without subsidy. Beginning February 1, 2007, the Department will rely on Big Sky Transportation Co., d/b/a Big Sky Airlines to provide subsidy-free EAS at Sheridan.
  - Notice (December 19, 2007): of Big Sky Transportation Co. d/b/a Big Sky Airlines of the termination of its unsubsidized scheduled service at Sheridan, Wyoming, effective on January 7, 2008.
  - Order 2007-12-27 (December 27, 2007): allowing Big Sky Transportation Co., d/b/a Big Sky Airlines, to suspend its unsubsidized scheduled air services at Sheridan, Wyoming, and Trenton, New Jersey, as of January 7, 2008.
