= Sheridan County, Wyoming =

County in Wyoming, United States

- County
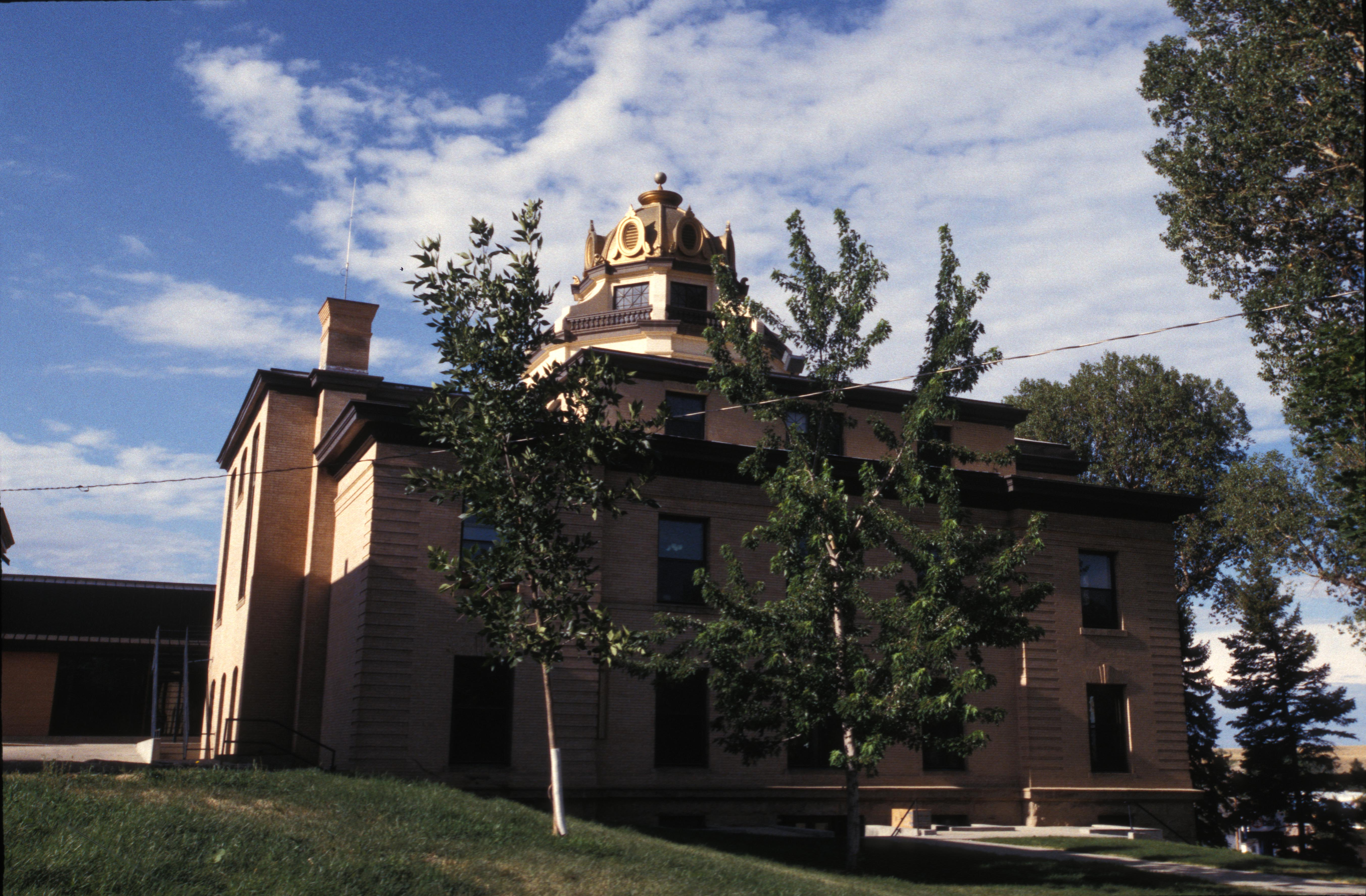
- Sheridan County Courthouse

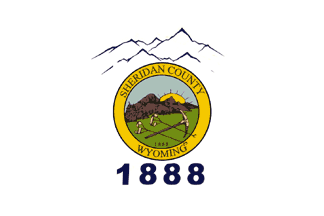
- Flag

- Location within the U.S. state of Wyoming
- Coordinates: 44°47′N 106°53′W
- Country: United States
- State: Wyoming
- Founded: March 9, 1888
- Named for: Philip Sheridan
- Seat: Sheridan
- Largest city: Sheridan

Area
  - Total: 2,527 sq mi (6,540 km^{2})
  - Land: 2,524 sq mi (6,540 km^{2})
  - Water: 3.1 sq mi (8.0 km^{2}) 0.1%

Population (2020)
  - Total: 30,921
  - Estimate (2025): 33,241 ▲
  - Density: 12.25/sq mi (4.730/km^{2})
- Time zone: UTC−7 (Mountain)
  - Summer (DST): UTC−6 (MDT)
- Congressional district: At-large
- Website: www.sheridancountywy.gov

Sheridan County is a county in the U.S. state of Wyoming. As of the 2020 United States census, the population was 30,921. The county seat is Sheridan. Its northern boundary abuts the Montana state border. Sheridan County comprises the Sheridan, WY Micropolitan Statistical Area.

== History ==
Sheridan County was created by the legislature of the Wyoming Territory on March 9, 1888. The county was formed from a portion of Johnson County. Sheridan County was named for Philip Sheridan, a general in the American Civil War and controversial Indian fighter.

A portion of Sheridan County was annexed in 1897 to create Big Horn County. Sheridan County boundary lines were also slightly altered in 1911, and again in 1929, after which it has retained its boundary lines to the present time.

== Geography ==
According to the U.S. Census Bureau, the county has a total area of 2,527 square miles (6,540 km^{2}), of which 2,524 square miles (6,540 km^{2}) is land and 3.1 square miles (8.0 km^{2}) (0.1%) is water.

=== Adjacent counties ===
- Big Horn County, Montana – north
- Powder River County, Montana – northeast
- Campbell County – east
- Johnson County – south
- Big Horn County – west

=== Major highways ===
- Interstate 90
- I-90 BL
- U.S. Highway 14
- U.S. Highway 16
- U.S. Highway 87
- Wyoming Highway 330
- Wyoming Highway 331
- Wyoming Highway 332
- Wyoming Highway 334
- Wyoming Highway 335
- Wyoming Highway 336
- Wyoming Highway 337
- Wyoming Highway 338
- Wyoming Highway 339
- Wyoming Highway 341
- Wyoming Highway 342
- Wyoming Highway 343
- Wyoming Highway 345

=== Transit ===
- Goose Creek Transit
- Jefferson Lines

=== National protected area ===
- Bighorn National Forest (part)

== Demographics ==
Historical population
Census	Pop.	Note	%±
1890	1,972		—
1900	5,122		159.7%
1910	16,324		218.7%
1920	18,182		11.4%
1930	16,875		−7.2%
1940	19,255		14.1%
1950	20,185		4.8%
1960	18,989		−5.9%
1970	17,852		−6.0%
1980	25,048		40.3%
1990	23,562		−5.9%
2000	26,560		12.7%
2010	29,116		9.6%
2020	30,921		6.2%
2025 (est.)	33,241	▲	7.5%
US Decennial Census; 1870–2000 2010–2020

=== 2020 census ===
As of the 2020 census, the county had a population of 30,921. Of the residents, 21.4% were under the age of 18 and 22.5% were 65 years of age or older; the median age was 43.1 years. For every 100 females there were 99.0 males, and for every 100 females age 18 and over there were 96.8 males.

Sheridan County, Wyoming – Racial and ethnic composition Note: the US Census treats Hispanic/Latino as an ethnic category. This table excludes Latinos from the racial categories and assigns them to a separate category. Hispanics/Latinos may be of any race.
Race / Ethnicity (NH = Non-Hispanic)	Pop 2000	Pop 2010	Pop 2020	% 2000	% 2010	% 2020
White alone (NH)	25,122	27,119	27,509	94.59%	93.14%	88.97%
Black or African American alone (NH)	44	94	110	0.17%	0.32%	0.36%
Native American or Alaska Native alone (NH)	306	324	324	1.15%	1.11%	1.05%
Asian alone (NH)	101	192	180	0.38%	0.66%	0.58%
Pacific Islander alone (NH)	33	14	17	0.12%	0.05%	0.05%
Other race alone (NH)	31	8	126	0.12%	0.03%	0.41%
Mixed race or Multiracial (NH)	277	352	1,239	1.04%	1.21%	4.01%
Hispanic or Latino (any race)	646	1,013	1,416	2.43%	3.48%	4.58%
Total	26,560	29,116	30,921	100.00%	100.00%	100.00%

The racial makeup of the county was 90.6% White, 0.4% Black or African American, 1.2% American Indian and Alaska Native, 0.6% Asian, 1.5% from some other race, and 5.7% from two or more races. Hispanic or Latino residents of any race comprised 4.6% of the population.

There were 13,349 households in the county, of which 25.4% had children under the age of 18 living with them and 24.4% had a female householder with no spouse or partner present. About 32.8% of all households were made up of individuals and 14.6% had someone living alone who was 65 years of age or older.

There were 14,884 housing units, of which 10.3% were vacant. Among occupied housing units, 69.9% were owner-occupied and 30.1% were renter-occupied. The homeowner vacancy rate was 1.2% and the rental vacancy rate was 6.9%.

=== 2010 census ===
As of the 2010 United States census, there were 29,116 people, 12,360 households, and 7,701 families in the county. The population density was 11.5 people per square mile (4.4 people/km^{2}). There were 13,939 housing units at an average density of 5.5 units per square mile (2.1 units/km^{2}). The racial makeup of the county was 95.4% white, 1.2% American Indian, 0.7% Asian, 0.4% black or African American, 0.1% Pacific islander, 0.7% from other races, and 1.5% from two or more races. Those of Hispanic or Latino origin made up 3.5% of the population. In terms of ancestry, 31.5% were German, 16.3% were Irish, 11.8% were English, 7.5% were American, 6.2% were Norwegian, and 5.1% were Polish.

Of the 12,360 households, 27.5% had children under the age of 18 living with them, 49.8% were married couples living together, 8.4% had a female householder with no husband present, 37.7% were non-families, and 30.9% of all households were made up of individuals. The average household size was 2.27 and the average family size was 2.84. The median age was 41.9 years.

The median income for a household in the county was $48,141 and the median income for a family was $61,959. Males had a median income of $45,035 versus $30,780 for females. The per capita income for the county was $26,756. About 5.2% of families and 8.5% of the population were below the poverty line, including 8.1% of those under age 18 and 7.2% of those age 65 or over.

=== 2000 census ===
As of the 2000 United States census, of 2000, there were 26,560 people, 11,167 households, and 7,079 families in the county. The population density was 10 people per square mile (3.9 people/km^{2}). There were 12,577 housing units at an average density of 5 units per square mile (1.9 units/km^{2}). The racial makeup of the county was 95.88% White, 0.18% Black or African American, 1.27% Native American, 0.38% Asian, 0.12% Pacific Islander, 0.82% from other races, and 1.34% from two or more races. 2.43% of the population were Hispanic or Latino of any race. 24.8% were of German, 12.3% English, 10.3% Irish, 7.1% American, 6.0% Norwegian and 5.1% Polish ancestry.

There were 11,167 households, out of which 28.40% had children under the age of 18 living with them, 52.00% were married couples living together, 8.20% had a female householder with no husband present, and 36.60% were non-families. 30.90% of all households were made up of individuals, and 12.50% had someone living alone who was 65 years of age or older. The average household size was 2.31 and the average family size was 2.90.

The county population contained 24.10% under the age of 18, 8.00% from 18 to 24, 25.30% from 25 to 44, 27.10% from 45 to 64, and 15.50% who were 65 years of age or older. The median age was 41 years. For every 100 females there were 95.90 males. For every 100 females age 18 and over, there were 94.00 males.

The median income for a household in the county was $34,538, and the median income for a family was $42,669. Males had a median income of $31,381 versus $20,354 for females. The per capita income for the county was $19,407. About 8.60% of families and 10.70% of the population were below the poverty line, including 14.40% of those under age 18 and 6.40% of those age 65 or over.

== Communities ==
=== City ===
- Sheridan (county seat)

=== Towns ===
- Clearmont
- Dayton
- Ranchester

=== Census-designated places ===
- Arvada
- Big Horn
- Parkman
- Powder Horn
- Story

=== Unincorporated communities ===
- Acme
- Banner
- Beckton
- Burgess Junction
- Kleenburn
- Leiter
- Monarch
- Ucross
- Ulm
- Wolf
- Wyarno

== Government and infrastructure ==
The Wyoming Department of Family Services Juvenile Services Division operates the Wyoming Girls' School, located near Sheridan. The facility was operated by the Wyoming Board of Charities and Reform until that agency was dissolved as a result of a state constitutional amendment passed in November 1990.

Sheridan County voters have been reliably Republican for decades. In only one national election since 1948 has the county selected the Democratic Party candidate (as of 2024) which was 1964 when Lyndon Johnson defeated Barry Goldwater by 2.8 percent. In 2024 Donald Trump received 73.3 percent of the vote; the best ever result for a Republican.

United States presidential election results for Sheridan County, Wyoming
Year	Republican		Democratic		Third party(ies)	
Year	No.	%	No.	%	No.	%
1892	509	46.36%	0	0.00%	589	53.64%
1896	877	44.03%	1,104	55.42%	11	0.55%
1900	1,018	49.80%	985	48.19%	41	2.01%
1904	1,905	59.49%	1,068	33.35%	229	7.15%
1908	2,158	54.99%	1,539	39.22%	227	5.78%
1912	862	20.29%	1,649	38.82%	1,737	40.89%
1916	1,914	37.92%	2,906	57.57%	228	4.52%
1920	2,645	60.43%	1,192	27.23%	540	12.34%
1924	2,530	42.76%	1,115	18.84%	2,272	38.40%
1928	3,616	57.86%	2,563	41.01%	71	1.14%
1932	2,738	38.34%	4,260	59.65%	144	2.02%
1936	2,726	35.49%	4,731	61.60%	223	2.90%
1940	3,814	46.13%	4,439	53.69%	15	0.18%
1944	3,802	49.61%	3,862	50.39%	0	0.00%
1948	3,698	48.65%	3,852	50.68%	51	0.67%
1952	6,522	67.55%	3,124	32.36%	9	0.09%
1956	5,546	63.38%	3,204	36.62%	0	0.00%
1960	5,690	60.05%	3,786	39.95%	0	0.00%
1964	4,491	48.61%	4,747	51.39%	0	0.00%
1968	5,163	61.22%	2,659	31.53%	612	7.26%
1972	6,432	69.03%	2,874	30.84%	12	0.13%
1976	5,382	62.21%	3,206	37.06%	64	0.74%
1980	5,649	58.56%	3,034	31.45%	963	9.98%
1984	7,460	66.14%	3,648	32.34%	171	1.52%
1988	5,980	55.48%	4,655	43.19%	143	1.33%
1992	4,303	37.21%	4,139	35.79%	3,123	27.00%
1996	5,892	48.91%	4,594	38.14%	1,560	12.95%
2000	8,424	68.85%	3,330	27.21%	482	3.94%
2004	9,689	69.06%	4,066	28.98%	274	1.95%
2008	10,177	67.93%	4,458	29.76%	346	2.31%
2012	10,267	71.69%	3,618	25.26%	437	3.05%
2016	10,266	70.75%	2,927	20.17%	1,317	9.08%
2020	11,843	72.09%	4,043	24.61%	542	3.30%
2024	12,041	73.31%	3,920	23.87%	464	2.82%

== See also ==
- National Register of Historic Places listings in Sheridan County, Wyoming
- Wyoming
  - List of cities and towns in Wyoming
  - List of counties in Wyoming
  - Wyoming statistical areas
