= Mayoral elections in Gillette, Wyoming =

Mayoral elections in Gillette, Wyoming are held every four years, coinciding with the United States midterm election. Gillette is Wyoming's third-largest city by population.

== General election summaries ==
Year	Winners			Runners-up			Write-in		Total
Year	Candidate	Vote	%	Candidate	Vote	%	Vote	%	Total	Maj.	%
2022	Shay Lundvall	4,168	52.12	Nathan McLeland	3,783	47.31	46	0.58	7,997	+385	+4.81
2018	Louise Carter-King	4,688	57.35	Jarik Dudley	3,441	42.09	46	0.56	8,175	+1,247	+15.25
2014	Louise Carter-King	3,301	51.80	Kevin J. McGrath	3,048	47.83	24	0.38	6,373	+253	+3.97
2010	Tom Murphy	3,961	61.51	Everett Boss	2,400	37.27	79	1.23	6,440	+1,561	+24.24
2006	Duane Evenson	3,116	49.93	Mike McInerney	3102	49.70	23	0.37	6,241	+14	+0.22
2002	Duane Evenson	3,589	64.63	Brooks Worman	1,964	35.37	—	—	5,553	+1,625	+29.26
1998	Frank W. Latta	4,169	100.00	—	—	—	—	—	4,169	+4,169	+100.00
1994	Frank W. Latta	3,572	54.83	Edd Collins	2,943	45.17	—	—	6,515	+629	+9.65
1990	Edd Collins	3,136	62.98	Roy Shambaugh	1,843	37.02	—	—	4,979	+1,293	+25.97
1986	Herb Carter	3,129	62.11	Hug Bennett	1,909	37.89	—	—	5,038	+1,220	+24.22
1982	Herb Carter	?	?	Vincent White	?	?	—	—	?	?	?
1978	Mike Enzi	Unopp.	100.00	—	—	—	—	—	?	?	?
1974	Mike Enzi	1,704	75.70	James T. McManamen	547	24.30	—	—	2,251	+1,157	+51.40
1970	Cliff Davis	1,245	70.06	Kelly Swenson	532	29.94	—	—	1,777	+713	+40.12

== 2026 ==
The incumbent mayor is Shay Lundvall since 2023. Lundvall announced his bid for re-election on January 17, 2026.

== 2022 ==
2022 Gillette, Wyoming mayoral election
- November 8 (general); August 16 (primary)
Candidate	Shay Lundvall	Nathan McLeland	Jarik Dudley
General	4,168; 52.12%	3,783; 47.31%	Eliminated
Primary	3,210; 42.18%	3,029; 39.80%	1,345; 17.67%
- General election results by precinct Lundvall: 50–60% 60–70% McLeleand: 50–60%
Mayor before election
Eric Hanson
Elected mayor
Shay Lundvall

In January 2022, incumbent mayor Louise Carter-King resigned. Nathan McLeland served as acting mayor for a month before Eric Hanson was elected mayor by the city council to serve the remainder of King's term. Hanson did not run for a full term.

=== Candidates ===
- Shay Lundvall, city councillor (2017–2023)
- Nathan McLeland, city councillor (2019–present) and acting mayor (2022)

==== Eliminated in primary ====
- Jarik Dudley

=== Primary election ===
2022 Cheyenne, Wyoming mayoral primary election
Party	Candidate	Votes	%
Nonpartisan	Shay Lundvall	3,210	42.18
Nonpartisan	Nathan McLeland	3,029	39.80
Nonpartisan	Jarik Dudley	1,345	17.67
Write-in		26	0.34
Valid ballots		7,610	95.35
Invalid or blank votes		371	4.65
Total votes		7,981	100.00

=== General election ===
2022 Cheyenne, Wyoming mayoral general election
Party	Candidate	Votes	%
Nonpartisan	Shay Lundvall	4,168	52.12
Nonpartisan	Nathan McLeland	3,783	47.31
Write-in		46	0.58
Total votes		7,997	100.00

== See also ==
- Elections in Wyoming
- Political party strength in Wyoming
- Government of Wyoming
