= Interstate 90 in Wyoming =

Highway in Wyoming

Interstate 90
- I-90 highlighted in red

Route information
- Maintained by WYDOT
- Length: 208.80 mi (336.03 km)
- NHS: Entire route

Major junctions
- West end: I-90 / US 87 at Montana state line
- US 14 in Ranchester; US 14 / US 87 / I-90 BL / US 14 Bus. in Sheridan; US 87 near Banner; I-25 / US 87 in Buffalo; US 16 / I-90 BL in Buffalo; US 14 / US 16 / I-90 BL in Gillette; US 14 / US 16 in Moorcroft; US 14 / I-90 BL in Sundance
- East end: I-90 / US 14 at South Dakota state line

Location
- Country: United States
- State: Wyoming
- Counties: Sheridan, Johnson, Campbell, Crook

Highway system
- Interstate Highway System; Main; Auxiliary; Suffixed; Business; Future; Wyoming State Highway System; Interstate; US; State
← US 89	→ WYO 90

Interstate 90 (I-90) in the US state of Wyoming traverses the northeastern corner of the state, passing through the cities and communities of Sheridan, Buffalo, and Gillette.

== Route description ==
I-90 enters Wyoming from Montana and heads south concurrent with US Highway 87 (US 87) through hilly grasslands. It curves to the southeast and meets an interchange that serves the small community of Parkman. Continuing southeast, the highway intersects US 14 at a diamond interchange. US 14 joins I-90 and US 87, and the three routes curve east. After the freeway bends back to the southeast, it intersects the eastern end of Wyoming Highway 345 (WYO 345), then crosses the BNSF Railway (formerly the Chicago, Burlington and Quincy Railroad) and the Tongue River. The highway serves as the western terminus of WYO 339 and then passes over WYO 338 without an intersection just before it crosses Goose Creek. Just south of Goose Creek, US 14 and US 87 split off to the south of I-90 via a trumpet interchange. This road is also signed as a I-90 Business (I-90 Bus.).

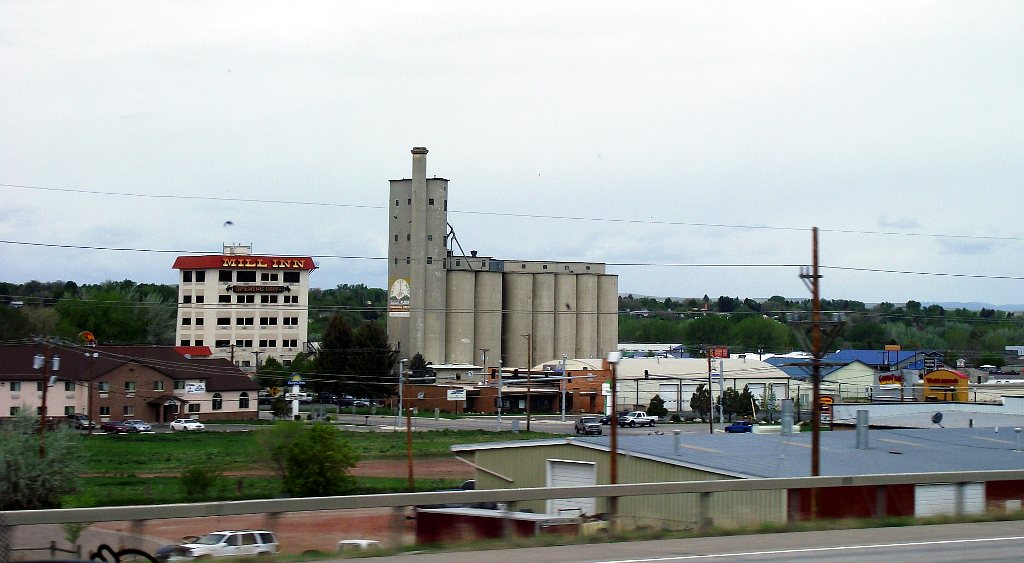
View of south Sheridan from I-90

The freeway turns due south and skirts around the eastern edge of Sheridan. It intersects WYO 336, then crosses over the BNSF Railway again, before intersecting US 14 farther south. South of Sheridan, I-90 continues to travel south roughly parallel to US 87. The highway intersects WYO 342 and Prairie Dog Creek Road at diamond interchanges before US 87 merges back into and becomes concurrent with I-90. The highway runs southwest of Lake Desmet. Here, it meets Lake Ridge Road, which leads to the lake.

Southeast of Lake Desmet, I-90/US 87 comes to a diamond interchange with Rock Creek Road. It then intersects US 87 Bus. and I-25 Bus. at an incomplete diamond interchange; only traffic heading southbound can exit, and traffic from the business loops can only access I-90 northbound. Just southeast of this interchange, I-90 meets the northern terminus of I-25. US 87 follows I-25 southbound toward Buffalo, while I-90 bends to the southeast and intersects US 16 at a diamond interchange.

Southeast of Buffalo, I-90 continues in a general southeasterly direction through hilly grasslands. The highway intersects several minor farm roads, then curves to the northeast toward Gillette. Just west of the city, the freeway turns due east. Within Gillette, I-90 comes to a diamond interchange with WYO 50 and its own business loop, then dips to the southeast and meets another diamond interchange, this one with WYO 59. I-90 then has one last exit in Gillette: a partial cloverleaf interchange with US 14, US 16, and WYO 51. The first two of those routes become concurrent with I-90 and follow it east.

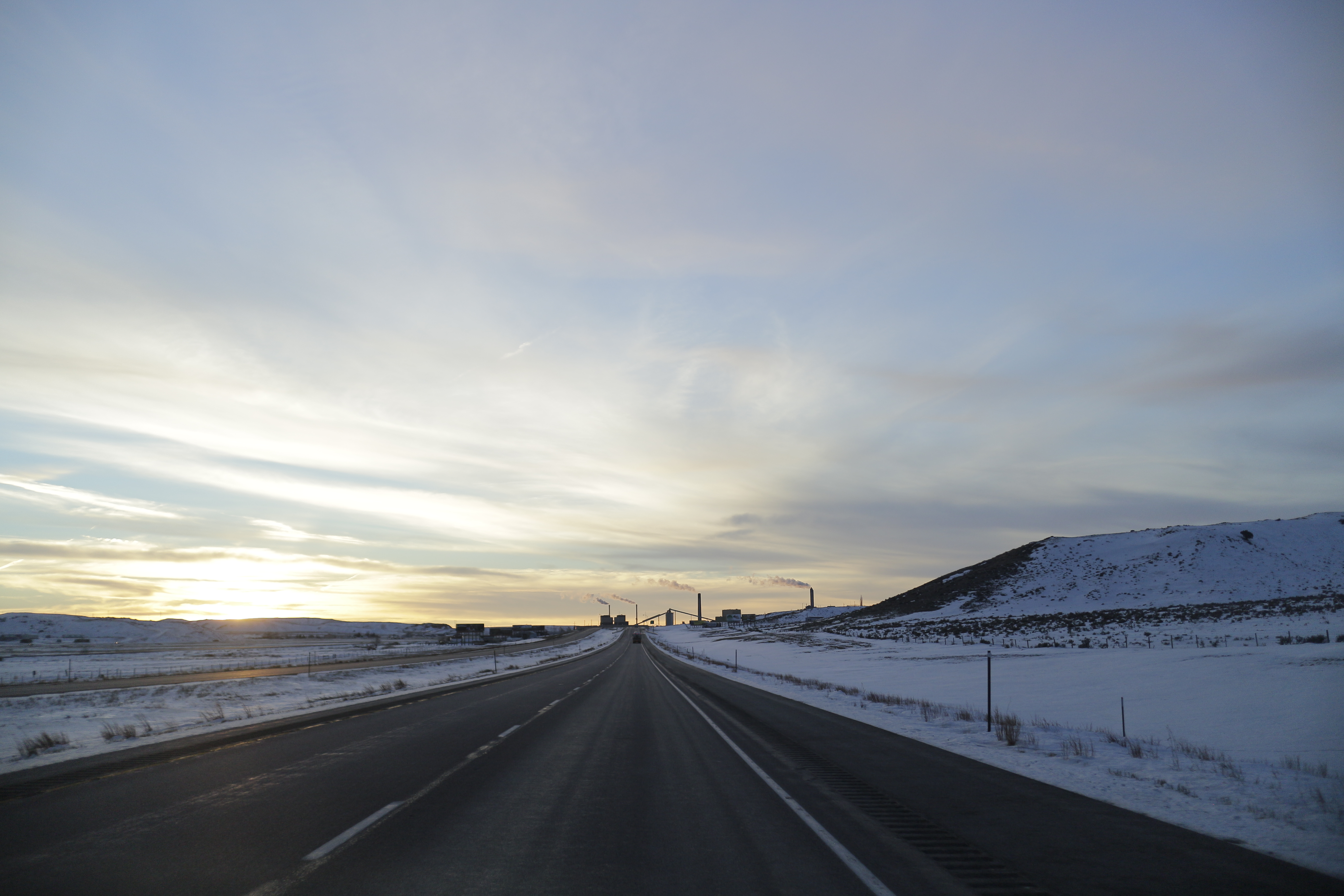
I-90 westbound between Rozet and Wyodak

The freeway crosses the BNSF Railway and then turns to the east. It meets a diamond interchange with Garner Lake Road, then leaves Gillette and intersects American Road before crossing the BNSF Railway again. The highway travels east, parallel to WYO 51 and then meets Adon Road, then curves to the southeast toward Moorcroft. I-90 has two exits in Moorcroft; at the first exit, US 14 and US 16 leave I-90, and I-90's business loop begins. The highway passes over US 14 with no access and then meets its second exit in the city: the eastern terminus of its business loop. East of this exit, I-90 leaves the city.

East of Moorcroft, I-90 intersects several more minor rural roads while it bends to the northeast toward Sundance. As it nears Sundance, it shares a diamond interchange with US 14 and I-90 Bus. The route then curves to the east and enters the city, intersecting WYO 585 at a diamond interchange. I-90 then meets US 14 and the eastern terminus of I-90 Bus.; the former becomes concurrent with I-90, and the two routes head northeast, leaving Sundance. Northeast of Sundance, I-90/US 14 parallels the former alignment of the latter. The highway intersects Sundance-Moskee Road, then bends north and meets WYO 111. I-90/US 14 then has one last exit, with Sand Creek Road, before crossing into South Dakota.

=== Transit ===
Jefferson Lines provides intercity bus service along the length of I-90 in Wyoming serving Gillette, Buffalo, and Sheridan along the route.

== History ==
During early planning of I-90, the town of Clearmont (on US 14) filed suit against the Wyoming Highway Commission for an alleged violation of a 1955 state law that required approval from voters for the construction of a bypass. The town sought an injunction to halt construction and reroute I-90 towards the town, which was 29 miles (47 km) north of the planned alignment, arguing it would be a straighter route between Sheridan and Gillette. Clearmont had previously been selected for a rerouting of US 14 and US 16 in 1957, which was seen as a precursor to a later Interstate Highway; the straighter route was also supported by business groups in Sheridan. The injunction was denied by a state district judge in 1959 and was appealed to the Wyoming Supreme Court, which ruled in favor of the state highway commission in December 1960.

Construction of I-90 in northwestern Wyoming began during the appeals process, with 58 miles (93 km) under active contracts for grading and site preparation by December 1960. The first section to open in Wyoming ran 6.9 miles (11.1 km) north of Sheridan and was completed in 1961. The bypass of Sheridan, one of the first major sections of the freeway, was opened to traffic on July 28, 1962. The longest stretch, 65 miles (105 km) between Buffalo and Gillette, was dedicated on October 14, 1962, and cost $18.4 million to construct. It was initially a two-lane limited-access road that was later widened to four lanes. The final link in the 20-mile (32 km) section between Sheridan and Buffalo was opened in December 1968.

The final Wyoming section of I-90 was opened to traffic on October 10, 1985, following four years of construction on 10 miles (16 km) between the Montana state border and Ranchester. It was also the final section of the Interstate Highway System to be completed in the state. The Ranchester section, which had been completed for three months but delayed to coincide with work across the border in Montana, was dedicated by the governors of Montana and Wyoming in a joint ceremony.

== Exit list ==
County	Location	mi	km	Exit	Destinations	Notes
Sheridan		0.00	0.00		I-90 west / US 87 north – Hardin	Continuation into Montana
Sheridan		1.79	2.88	1	Parkman	
Sheridan	Ranchester	9.88	15.90	9	US 14 west – Greybull, Lovell, Ranchester, Dayton, Yellowstone National Park, Grand Teton National Park	West end of US 14 overlap
Sheridan		14.62	23.53	14	WYO 345 – Acme	
Sheridan		16.34	26.30	16	WYO 339 – Decker	
Sheridan	Sheridan	20.92	33.67	20	I-90 BL east / US 14 Bus. east / US 87 Bus. south (North Main Street) / WYO 338 north (Decker Road)	
Sheridan	Sheridan	23.15	37.26	23	WYO 336 (Fifth Street)	
Sheridan	Sheridan	25.40	40.88	25	I-90 BL west / US 14 east / US 14 Bus. west / US 87 south – Sheridan, Big Horn, Ucross	East end of US 14 / US 87 overlap
Sheridan		32.98	53.08	33	WYO 342 (Meade Creek Road) – Big Horn, Banner, Story	
Sheridan		37.16	59.80	37	Prairie Dog Creek Road	
Johnson		44.69	71.92	44	Piney Creek Road (US 87 north)	West end of US 87 overlap
Johnson		47.71	76.78	47	Shell Creek Road	
Johnson		51.36	82.66	51	Lake De Smet	
Johnson		53.83	86.63	53	Rock Creek Road	
Johnson	Buffalo	56.36	90.70	56A	I-25 BL south / I-90 BL east / US 87 Bus. south – Buffalo	Eastbound exit and westbound entrance
Johnson	Buffalo	56.85	91.49	56B	I-25 south / US 87 south – Casper	East end of US 87 overlap; I-25 to 90 east exit 300; northern terminus of I-25
Johnson	Buffalo	58.65	94.39	58	I-90 BL west / US 16 – Buffalo, Ucross	
Johnson		65.98	106.18	65	Red Hills Road, Tipperary Road	
Johnson		69.64	112.07	69	Dry Creek Road	
Johnson		73.01	117.50	73	Crazy Woman Creek Road	
Johnson		77.91	125.38	77	Schoonover Road	
Johnson		82.83	133.30	82	Indian Creek Road	
Johnson		88.67	142.70	88	Powder River Road	
Johnson		91.49	147.24	91	Dead Horse Creek Road	
Campbell		102.52	164.99	102	Barber Creek Road	
Campbell		106.14	170.82	106	Kingsbury Road	
Campbell		113.97	183.42	113	Wild Horse Creek Road	
Campbell		116.24	187.07	116	Force Road	
Campbell	Gillette	124.26	199.98	124	I-90 BL east / WYO 50 to US 14 west / US 16 west – Gillette	
Campbell	Gillette	126.39	203.40	126	WYO 59 – Douglas	
Campbell	Gillette	128.09	206.14	128	I-90 BL west / US 14 west / US 16 west / WYO 51 east – Gillette	West end of US 14/US 16 overlap
Campbell		129.10	207.77	129	Garner Lake Road	
Campbell	Wyodak	132.99	214.03	132	Wyodak Road	
Campbell		141.24	227.30	141	Rozet	
Crook	Moorcroft	153.41	246.89	153	I-90 BL east / US 14 east / US 16 east – Moorcroft, Newcastle	East end of US 14/US 16 overlap
Crook	Moorcroft	154.77	249.08	154	I-90 BL west to US 14 / US 16 – Moorcroft	
Crook		160.66	258.56	160	Wind Creek Road	
Crook		165.68	266.64	165	Pine Ridge Road – Pine Haven	
Crook		172.09	276.95	172	Inyan Kara Road	
Crook		178.92	287.94	178	Coal Divide Road	
Crook		185.73	298.90	185	I-90 BL east / US 14 to WYO 116 – Sundance	
Crook	Sundance	187.53	301.80	187	WYO 585 – Sundance, Newcastle	
Crook	Sundance	189.00	304.17	189	I-90 BL west / US 14 west – Sundance	West end of US 14 overlap
Crook		191.92	308.87	191	CR 207 (Moskee Road)	
Crook		199.31	320.76	199	WYO 111 – Aladdin	
Crook	Beulah	205.90	331.36	205	Beulah	
Crook		208.80	336.03		I-90 east / US 14 east – Sturgis	Continuation into South Dakota
1.000 mi = 1.609 km; 1.000 km = 0.621 mi: Concurrency terminus; Incomplete access

== Business routes ==
Business routes are present in Sheridan (also carries US 14 Bus. and US 87 Bus.), Buffalo, Gillette, and Sundance (also part of US 14).

Interstate 90
Previous state: Montana	Wyoming	Next state: South Dakota
