= Wyoming Highway 345 =

State highway in Wyoming, United States

Wyoming Highway 345
- WYO 345 highlighted in red

Route information
- Maintained by WYDOT
- Length: 19.27 mi (31.01 km)
- Existed: 1985–present

Major junctions
- West end: S-451 at Montana state line
- East end: I-90 / US 14 / US 87 in Acme

Location
- Country: United States
- State: Wyoming
- Counties: Sheridan

Highway system
- Wyoming State Highway System; Interstate; US; State
← WYO 344	→ WYO 346

Wyoming Highway 345 (WYO 345) is a 19.27-mile-long (31.01 km) east–west Wyoming State Road located in northern Sheridan County.

== Route description ==
Wyoming Highway 345 begins its western end (or northern end at this point) at Montana Secondary Highway 451 at the Montana State Line, approximately 3 miles north of Parkman, Wyoming. For its entire length, WYO 345 parallels the Burlington Northern Santa Fe Railway and to some extent Interstate 90/US Route 87, which lies north of it. Highway 345 travels through the census-designated place (CDP) of Parkman at about 3 miles, as it turns gently southeast. Shortly after, the northern terminus of Wyoming Highway 343, which links to US 14 at Dayton, is met at just under 6 miles. Highway 345 continues eastward toward Ranchester which it reaches nearing 12 miles and US 14 which provides access to exit 9 of Interstate 90. Past Ranchester WYO 345 now closely parallels the interstate in its last stretch. Highway 345 meets Interstate 90/US Route 87/US Route 14 at Milepost 19.27, at the "Acme Interchange," its eastern terminus. The roadway continues east as Acme Road past the interchange to Acme.

== History ==
The entire length of Wyoming Highway 345 was originally designated as US Route 87. This section of US 87 was the last to be decommissioned in favor of the I-90 routing. In March 1985, when I-90 was completed, the Interstate Highway System in Wyoming was completed. At the same time, US 87 was rerouted to Interstate 90 and as a result the former routing through Ranchester became WYO 345.

== Major intersections ==
The entire route is in Sheridan County.

Location	mi	km	Destinations	Notes
	0.00	0.00	S-451 north	Continuation beyond Montana state line
Parkman	5.81	9.35	WYO 343 south	
Ranchester	12.80	20.60	US 14 to I-90 / US 87	To exit 9 on I-90
	19.27	31.01	I-90 / US 14 / US 87	Exit 14 on I-90
1.000 mi = 1.609 km; 1.000 km = 0.621 mi
