= Wyodak, Wyoming =

Wyodak
- Unincorporated community
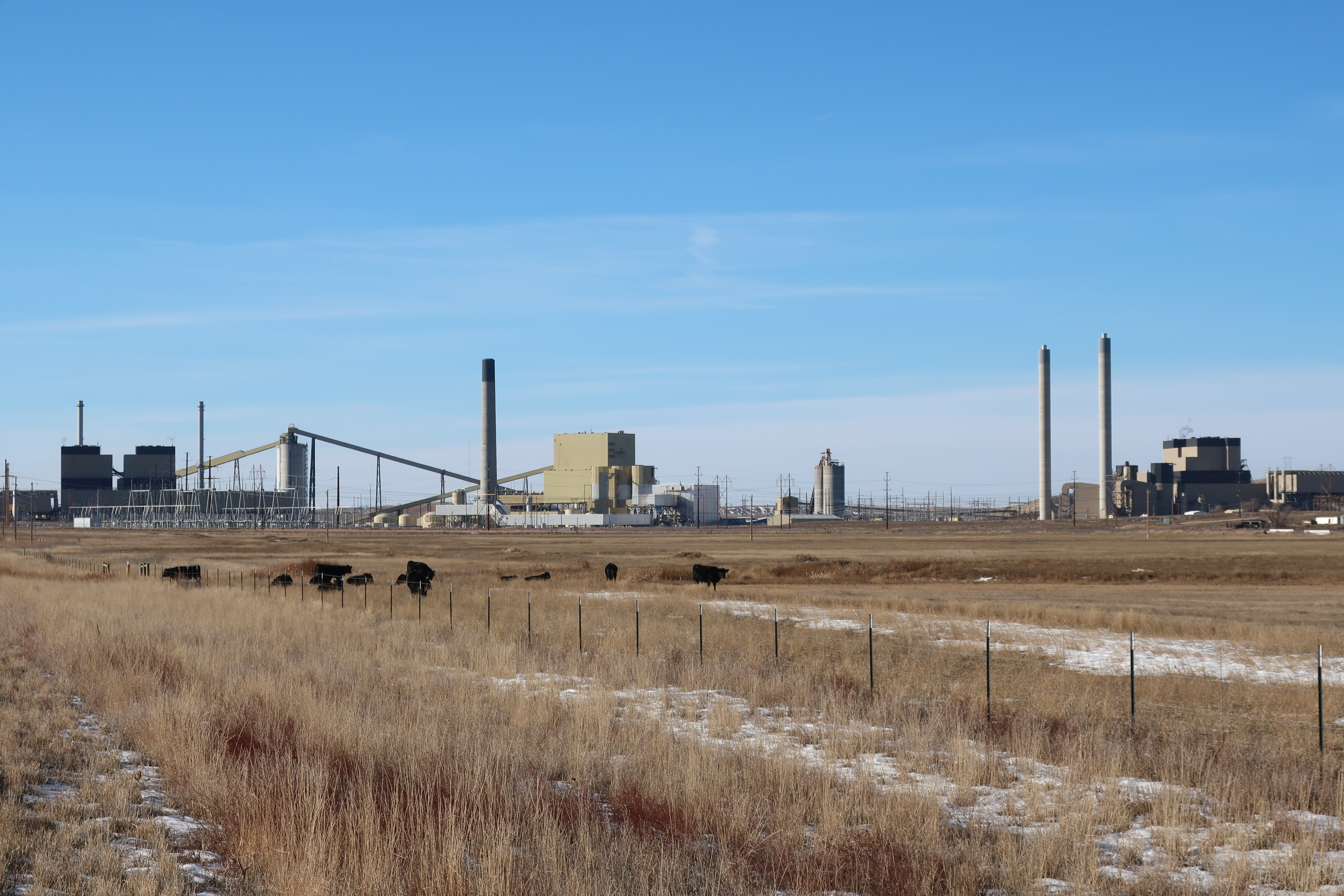
- Wyodak, as seen from Wyoming Highway 51, December 2017

- Location within the state of Wyoming Wyodak (the United States)
- Coordinates: 44°17′29″N 105°22′47″W
- Country: United States
- State: Wyoming
- County: Campbell
- Elevation: 4,423 ft (1,348 m)
- Time zone: UTC-7 (Mountain (MST))
  - Summer (DST): UTC-6 (MDT)
- ZIP codes: 82718
- Area code: 307
- GNIS feature ID: 1596649

Wyodak is an unincorporated community in east-central Campbell County, Wyoming, United States.

== History ==
Wyodak began around 1925 and was established to house employees of the Wyodak Coal Company. In the 1960s, the company planned to mine the area, leading to the houses being gradually moved.

== Transportation ==
The following highways pass through Wyodak:

- I-90 (Interstate 90)
- US 14 (U.S. Route 14)
- US 16 (U.S. Route 16)
- WYO 59 (Wyoming Highway 59)
