= Wyoming Highway 343 =

State highway in Wyoming, United States

Wyoming Highway 343
- Dayton-Ohlman Road
- WYO 343 highlighted in red

Route information
- Maintained by WYDOT
- Length: 5.24 mi (8.43 km)

Major junctions
- South end: US 14 north of Dayton
- North end: WYO 345 in Parkman

Location
- Country: United States
- State: Wyoming
- Counties: Sheridan

Highway system
- Wyoming State Highway System; Interstate; US; State
← WYO 342	→ WYO 344

Wyoming Highway 343 (WYO 343) is a 5.24-mile-long (8.43 km) north-south Wyoming State Road in northern Sheridan County that connects U.S. Route 14 (US 14) and WYO 345.

== Route description ==
Wyoming Highway 343 begins its southern end at U.S. Route 14 at Dayton and from there travels northwest. At approximately 4 miles into the route, Highway 343 gently curves northeast as it meets Sheridan County Route 118 (Columbus Creek Road). Shortly thereafter, WYO 343 turns due north. Highway 343 ends after 5.24 miles at Wyoming Highway 345 (former US 87) southeast of Parkman.

== Major intersections ==
The entire route is in Sheridan County.

Location	mi	km	Destinations	Notes
	0.00	0.00	US 14 north – Ranchester, Sheridan US 14 south – Dayton, Greybull, Lovell	Southern terminus; T intersection
Parkman	5.24	8.43	WYO 345 east – Ranchester WYO 345 west – Wyola (Montana)	Northern terminus; T intersection
1.000 mi = 1.609 km; 1.000 km = 0.621 mi

== See also ==
- List of state highways in Wyoming
