= Savageton, Wyoming =

- Unincorporated community
- Location within Wyoming
- Coordinates: 43°51′57″N 105°47′15″W
- Country: United States
- State: Wyoming
- County: Campbell
- Elevation: 5,115 ft (1,559 m)
- Time zone: UTC-7 (Mountain (MST))
  - Summer (DST): UTC-6 (MDT)
- Area code: 307
- GNIS feature ID: 1597490

Savageton is an unincorporated community in Campbell County, Wyoming, United States. Savageton is located on Wyoming Highway 50, 32 miles (51 km) south-southwest of Gillette.
