= Sheridan County School District Number 1 =

School district in Wyoming, United States

Sheridan County School District #1 is a public school district based in Ranchester, Wyoming, United States.

== Geography ==
Sheridan County School District #1 serves the western portion of Sheridan County, including the following communities:

- Incorporated places
  - Town of Dayton
  - Town of Ranchester
- Census-designated places (Note: All census-designated places are unincorporated.)
  - Big Horn
  - Parkman

== Schools ==
=== Secondary schools ===
- Grades 9-12
  - Tongue River High School
- Grades 6-12
  - Big Horn Middle/High School
- Grades 6-8
  - Tongue River Middle School

=== Elementary schools ===
- Grades K-5
  - Big Horn Elementary School
  - Tongue River Elementary School
- Grades K-4
  - Slack Elementary School

== Student demographics ==
The following figures are as of October 1, 2009.

- Total District Enrollment: 923
- Student enrollment by gender
  - Male: 464 (50.27%)
  - Female: 459 (49.73%)
- Student enrollment by ethnicity
  - American Indian or Alaska Native: 43 (4.66%)
  - Black or African American: 1 (0.11%)
  - Hispanic or Latino: 41 (4.44%)
  - Native Hawaiian or Other Pacific Islander: 2 (0.22%)
  - Two or More Races: 9 (0.98%)
  - White: 827 (89.60%)

== See also ==
- List of school districts in Wyoming
