= Wyoming Highway 51 =

State highway in Wyoming, United States

Wyoming Highway 51
- Rozet Road
- WYO 51 highlighted in red

Route information
- Maintained by WYDOT
- Length: 24.79 mi (39.90 km)

Major junctions
- West end: I-90 / US 14 / US 16 / I-90 BL in Gillette
- East end: US 14 / US 16 / I-90 BL in Moorcroft

Location
- Country: United States
- State: Wyoming
- Counties: Campbell, Crook

Highway system
- Wyoming State Highway System; Interstate; US; State
← WYO 50	→ WYO 59

Wyoming Highway 51 (WYO 51) is a 24.79-mile (39.90 km) long east–west Wyoming state highway located in Campbell and Crook Counties, between Gillette and Moorcroft.

== Route description ==
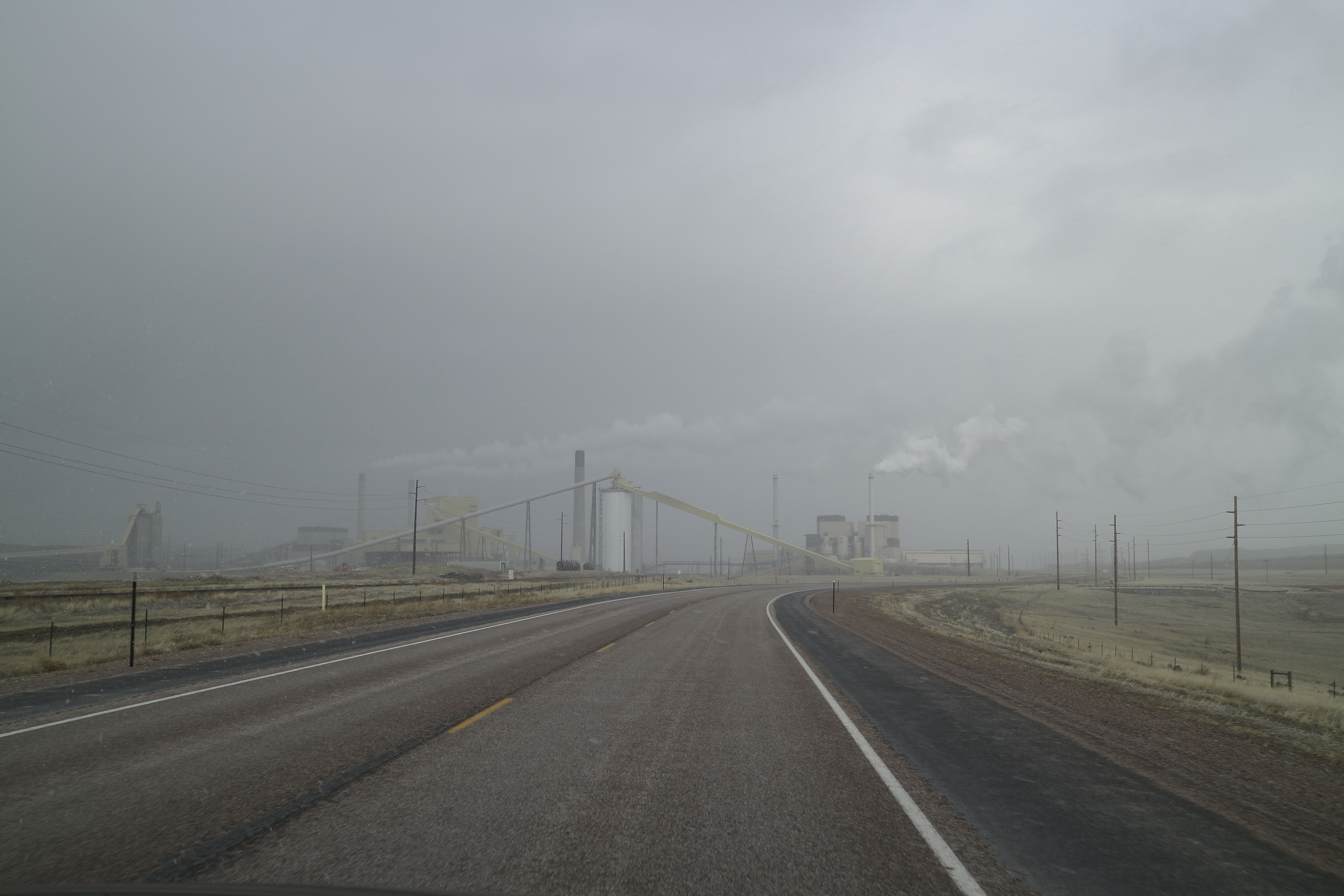
Wyoming Highway 51 eastbound near Wyodak power plant

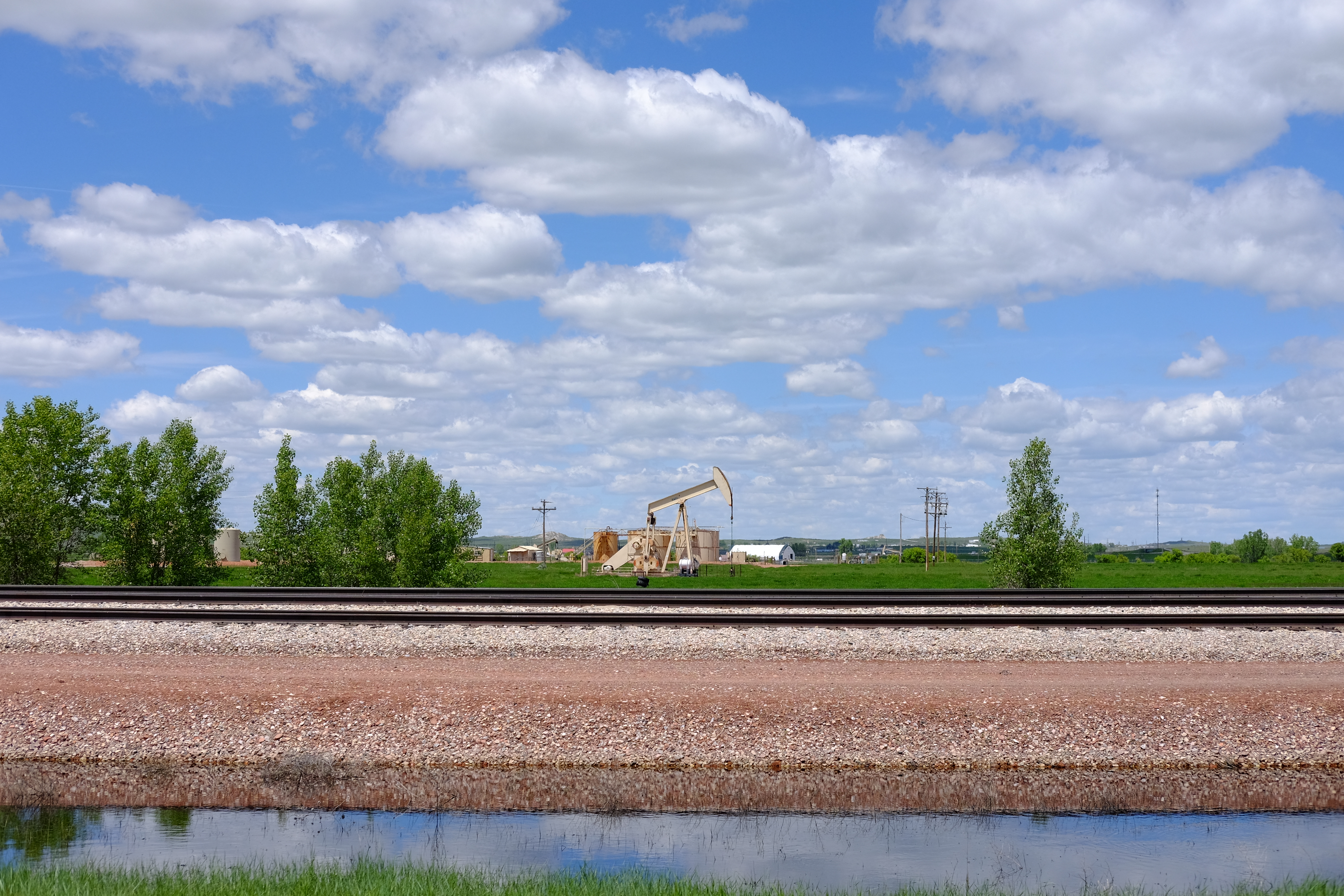
View from Wyoming Highway 51 in Rozet

Wyoming Highway 51 travels from the eastern outskirts of Gillette at an interchange with I-90/US 14/US 16 (Exit 128) and the eastern terminus of I-90 BUS east to the town of Moorcroft. Highway 51 travels east, passing through the communities of Wyodak and Rozet, south of the Campbell County fairgrounds , coal mines, and south of Wyodak power plant. Wyoming 51 is the old alignment for US 14/US 16; and for most of its length closely parallels Interstate 90 which carries US 14/US 16. WYO 51 comes to an end at just under 25 miles at US 14/US 16/I-90 BUS.

WYO 51 is signed as a secondary state highway, but not marked from the Interstate 90 interchanges like most secondary state highway frontage roads.

== History ==
Wyoming Highway 51 is the original alignment of US Route 14 and US Route 16. With the construction of Interstate 90, US 14 and US 16 were realigned onto that highway.

== Major intersections ==
County	Location	mi	km	Destinations	Notes
Campbell	Gillette	0.00	0.00	I-90 / US 14 / US 16 / I-90 BL west	Western terminus; eastern terminus of I-90 Bus.; exit 128 on I-90
Campbell	Gillette	0.81	1.30	Garner Lake Road to I-90	
Campbell	Wyodak	3.78	6.08	Wyodak Road to I-90	
Campbell	Rozet	13.12	21.11	Adon Road to I-90	
Crook	Moorcroft	24.79	39.90	US 14 / US 16 / I-90 BL to I-90	Eastern terminus
1.000 mi = 1.609 km; 1.000 km = 0.621 mi
