= Wyoming Highway 342 =

State highway in Wyoming, United States

Wyoming Highway 342
- Meade Creek Road
- WYO 342 highlighted in red

Route information
- Maintained by WYDOT
- Length: 1.14 mi (1.83 km)

Major junctions
- West end: US 87 / WYO 344 east of Big Horn
- East end: I-90 east of Big Horn

Location
- Country: United States
- State: Wyoming
- Counties: Sheridan

Highway system
- Wyoming State Highway System; Interstate; US; State
← WYO 341	→ WYO 343

Wyoming Highway 342 (WYO 342) is a 1.14-mile-long (1.83 km) east-west Wyoming State Road in south-central Sheridan County.

== Route description ==
Wyoming Highway 342 begins its western end at U.S. Route 87 (unsigned WYO 344) and heads east for 1.14 miles and ends at Interstate 90 (exit 33). Meade Creek Road itself continues another 3.7 miles to end at U.S. Route 14 northeast of here.

== Major intersections ==
The entire route is in Sheridan County.

Location	mi	km	Destinations	Notes
	0.00	0.00	US 87 / WYO 344	
	1.14	1.83	I-90	Exit 33 on I-90
1.000 mi = 1.609 km; 1.000 km = 0.621 mi
