= Wyoming Highway 50 =

State highway in Wyoming, United States

Wyoming Highway 50
- Skyline Drive
- WYO 50 highlighted in red

Route information
- Maintained by WYDOT
- Length: 51.48 mi (82.85 km)

Major junctions
- South end: WYO 387 in Pine Tree Junction
- I-90 / I-90 BL in Gillette
- North end: US 14 / US 16 / I-90 BL / WYO 59 in Gillette

Location
- Country: United States
- State: Wyoming
- Counties: Campbell

Highway system
- Wyoming State Highway System; Interstate; US; State
← WYO 37	→ WYO 51

Wyoming Highway 50 (WYO 50) is a 51.48-mile-long (82.85 km) north–south Wyoming state highway located in the southwestern and central part of Campbell County that travels from Wyoming Highway 387 at Pine Tree Junction north to Interstate 90, US 14/US 16/WYO 59 in Gillette.

== Route description ==
Wyoming Highway 50 starts at Wyoming Highway 387 in an area called Pine Tree Junction, located in southwestern Campbell County. WYO 50 heads due north, named 4J Road, and passes through the community of Savageton. Eighteen miles north of Savageton, Highway 50 turns and runs southwest to northeast until it reaches Gillette. Southwest of Gillette, at approximately 49 miles, WYO 50 changes names to Skyline Drive, as 4J Road, the old routing of WYO 50 into Gillette turns east. Highway 50 continues north-northeast into Gillette, intersecting Interstate 90 (Exit 124) and the south end of I-90 Business. I-90 BUS runs concurrent with WYO 50 for a short distance until WYO 50's northern terminus at a "T" intersection with US 14/US 16/WYO 59. I-90 BUS continues east from here overlapping US 14/US 16/ WYO 59.

== History ==
Wyoming Highway 50 originally had a different routing into the city of Gillette. According to a 1980 Wyoming state map, WYO 50 was formerly routed along 4J Road into Gillette. Sometime between 1980 and 1993, WYO 50 was moved from 4J Road to Skyline Drive, which provides easier access to Interstate 90.

== Major intersections ==
The entire route is in Campbell County.

Location	mi	km	Destinations	Notes
Pine Tree Junction	0.00	0.00	WYO 387	Southern terminus
Gillette	51.29	82.54	I-90 / I-90 BL begins – Buffalo, Moorcroft	Exit 124 on I-90; southern terminus of concurrency with I-90 Bus.
Gillette	51.48	82.85	US 14 / US 16 / I-90 BL east / WYO 59 – Gillette	Northern terminus; northern terminus of concurrency with I-90 Bus.
1.000 mi = 1.609 km; 1.000 km = 0.621 mi: Concurrency terminus
