= Wyoming Highway 59 =

State highway in Wyoming, United States

Wyoming Highway 59
- WYO 59 highlighted in red

Route information
- Maintained by WYDOT
- Length: 171.97 mi (276.76 km)
- Existed: 1945–present

Major junctions
- South end: I-25 / I-25 BL / US 20 Bus. / US 26 Bus. / US 87 Bus. / WYO 94 in Douglas
- I-90 in Gillette; US 14 / US 16 in Gillette
- North end: MT 59 on the Montana state line

Location
- Country: United States
- State: Wyoming
- Counties: Converse, Campbell

Highway system
- Wyoming State Highway System; Interstate; US; State
← WYO 51	→ WYO 70
← US 185	→ US 189
← WYO 377	→ WYO 390

Wyoming Highway 59 (WYO 59) is a 171.72-mile-long (276.36 km) north–south state highway that runs from Douglas to the Montana–Wyoming state line, where the roadway continues as Montana Highway 59 (MT 59).

== Route description ==
=== Douglas ===
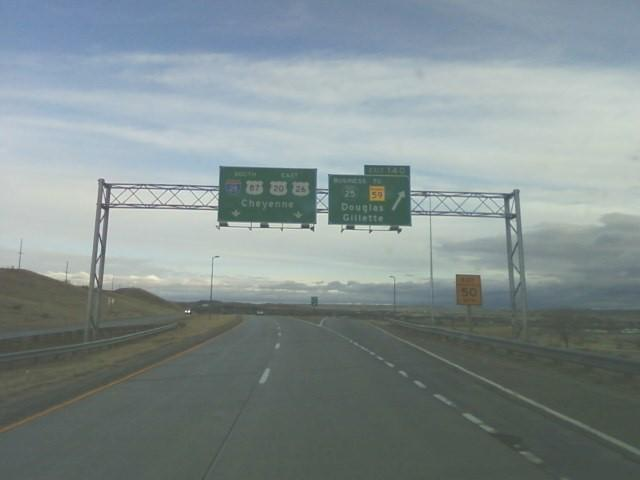
Interstate 25 (exit 140), I-25 Bl to WYO 59

WYO 59 begins its southern end at an intersection with I-25 BL/US 20 Bus./US 26 Bus./US 87 Bus (W. Yellowstone Highway), the northern terminus of WYO 94 (Esterbrook Road), and exit 140 on I-25 in Douglas. WYO 59 then intersects WYO 93 just 0.07 miles (0.11 km) north of its start. Past WYO 93, WYO 59 travels around the northwest side of Douglas and acts as a bypass. At 3.89 miles (6.26 km) there is a junction with WYO 59C, a spur of WYO 59 and the former routing of WYO 59 through Douglas.

=== Douglas to Gillette ===
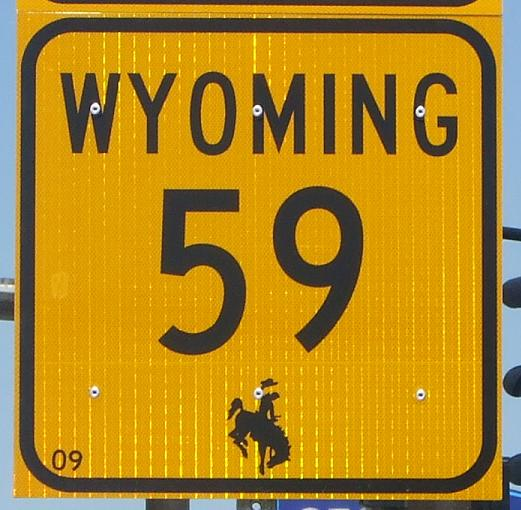
WYO 59 marker

WYO 59 along its route between Gillette and Douglas to some is one of the most desolate or barren place in the country. At approximately 38.5 miles (62.0 km) or halfway to Wright, WYO 59 passes through Bill, an unincorporated community in Converse County. Bill consists of a hotel and diner for Union Pacific Railroad employees who take mandatory rests in the town Between Bill and Wright, WYO 59 leaves Converse County and enters Campbell County.

At 74.07 miles (119.20 km), WYO 59 intersects WYO 450 just south of Wright. WYO 450 heads east from here to Newcastle. Approximately 2.7 miles (4.3 km) north of the WYO 450 intersection, WYO 59 intersects WYO 387 in Wright. WYO 387 travels west to Midwest and Edgerton. Wright is a town in Campbell County where settlement began in the 1970s, with the creation of the Black Thunder Coal Mine, the largest mine in the Powder River Basin and most productive mine in the United States. The town itself was incorporated in 1985. Established as a mining town, the majority of people living in Wright are employed by the various mines that surround it.

From Wright to Gillette there are no intersections with major highways and the landscape consists of buttes covered with short grasses. At 113 miles (182 km) into its route, WYO 59 enters Gillette as South Douglas Highway.

=== Gillette ===
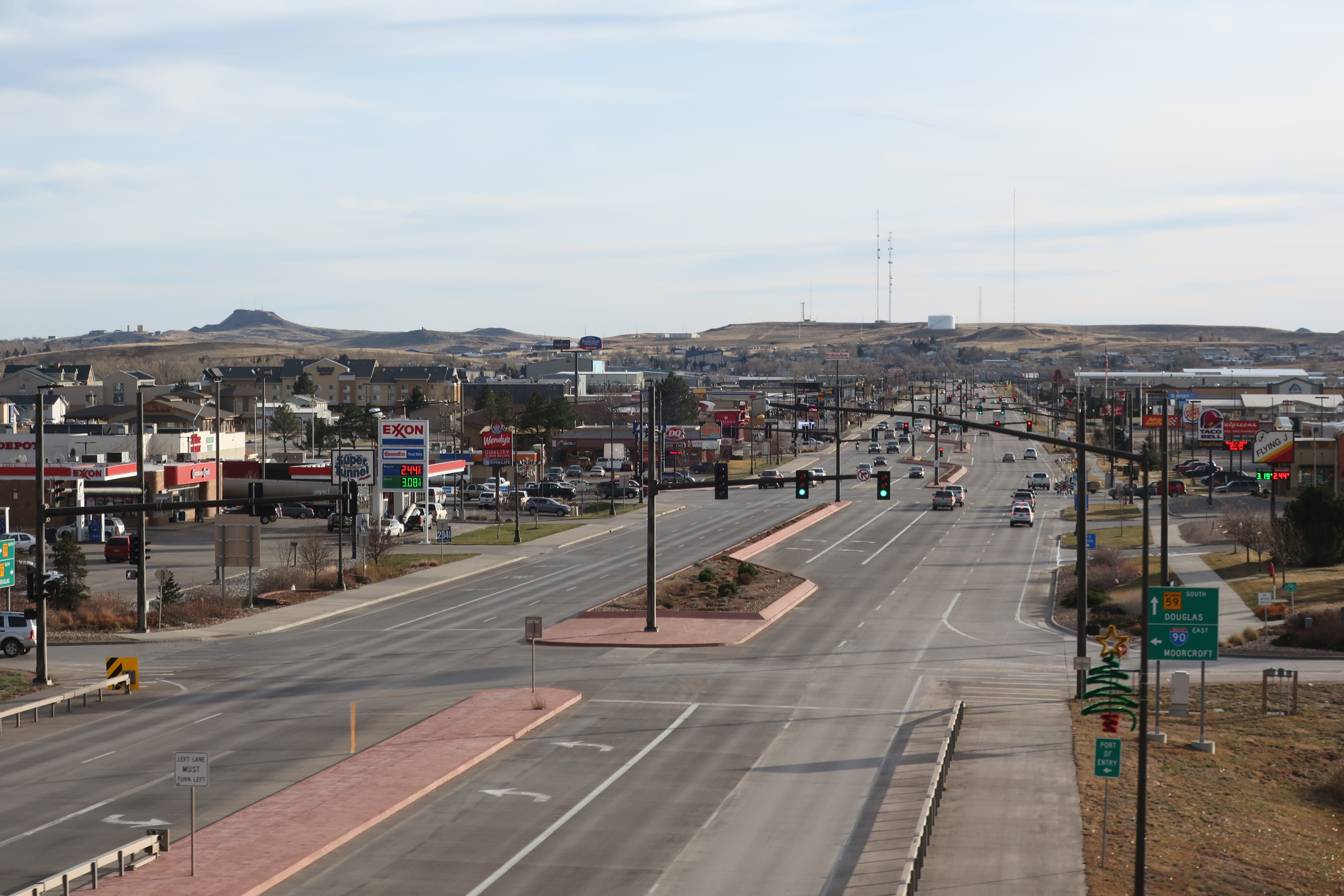
Wyoming Highway 59 seen from I-90 in Gillette

Gillette is a city and county seat of Campbell County. It is a small city centrally located in an area that is vital to the development of vast quantities of American coal, oil, and coal bed methane gas, as a result, the city calls itself the "Energy Capital of the Nation".

At about 113.8 miles (183.1 km), WYO 59 intersects I-90 (exit 126) and then enters downtown and intersects US 14/US 16/I-90 BL at a "T" intersection at 114.76 miles (184.69 km). WYO 59 turns west onto 2nd Street and runs concurrently with US 14/USv16/I-90 BL. Around 118 miles (190 km), WYO 59 begins to turn north and intersects WYO 50 (Skyline Drive). WYO 50 used to be routed down 4J Road into Gillette. Sometime between 1980 and 1993, WYO 50 was transferred to Skyline Drive, which provides easier access to I-90. At the intersection with WYO 50, I-90 BL turns west to run concurrently with WYO 50 to I-90. WYO 59 continues north concurrently with US 14/US 16 out of Gillette.

WYO 59 is also known as the South Douglas Highway in the Gillette area.

=== Gillette to Montana ===
A few miles north of Gillette, WYO 59 ends its concurrency with US 14/US 16 at a three-way intersection east of Rawhide Elementary School. WYO 59 turns east onto its own routing north, and US 14/US 16 continues north on its routing west.

At approximately 145.75 miles (234.56 km), WYO 59 passes through Weston. Weston is an unincorporated community in northern Campbell County, along the upper Little Powder River on the southeastern edge of the Thunder Basin National Grassland.

For the rest of the way through Campbell County, WYO 59 parallels Little Powder River that lies to the highway's east all the way to the state line. WYO 59 ends at the Montana-Wyoming state line. The highway continues north as MT 59 until its junction with MT 200 at Jordan, Montana.

Wyoming Highway 59 follows State Control Number P-43 for its entire length.

== History ==
The north–south route between Douglas and Gillette was originally numbered WYO 387 in the 1930s and was not paved. By 1948, it had been renumbered to Highway 59 and fully paved. The highway designation was extended north to the Montana border in 1967 over an existing road. Highway 59 carried significant truck traffic from oil fields, which caused noticeable damage on rural sections as well as congestion in Douglas.

As oil and coal extraction in the Powder River Basin increased in the early 2010s, WYDOT drafted plans to add additional passing lanes and install rumble strips on WYO 59. From 2005 to 2014, the highway was the site of collisions that killed 24 people—including eight in 2014 alone. The increase in fatal collisions prompted the state government to accelerate $21.2 million in funding for safety improvements at the expense of projects in other regions. The Casper Star-Tribune editorial board called WYO 59 the "highway of death" as well as the Powder River Basin's "central corridor" and supported funding the improvements. The Wyoming Highway Patrol also increased their staffing assignments along the corridor. The Teton County Commissioners voted in 2015 to ask that the state divert $30 million in funding earmarked for expansion of US 89 in the area to safety improvements on WYO 59.

On November 4, 2016, a new section of WYO 59 was opened to the north of the Eagle Butte Mine, north of Gillette. The northern section of the old WYO 59 was closed and later demolished to make room for the mine's expansion.

== Major intersections ==
County	Location	mi	km	Destinations	Notes
Converse	Douglas	0.00	0.00	I-25 BL / US 20 Bus. / US 26 Bus. / US 87 Bus. (Yellowstone Highway) / WYO 94 south to I-25 – Esterbrook, Casper, Cheyenne	Southern terminus; northern terminus of WYO 94; exit 140 on I-25 / US 20 / US 26 / US 87
Converse	Douglas	0.07	0.11	WYO 93 west – Fort Fetterman	Eastern terminus of WYO 93
Converse		3.89	6.26	4th Street (WYO 59C south) - Douglas	
Campbell		74.07	119.20	WYO 450 east – Newcastle	Western terminus of WYO 450
Campbell	Reno Junction	76.74	123.50	WYO 387 west – Wright, Midwest	Eastern terminus of WYO 387
Campbell	Gillette	113.82	183.18	I-90 – Buffalo, Moorcroft	Exit 126 on I-90
Campbell	Gillette	114.76	184.69	I-90 BL east / US 14 east / US 16 east to I-90	South terminus of concurrency with I-90 Bus. / US 14 / US 16
Campbell	Gillette	115.78	186.33	I-90 BL west / WYO 50 south to I-90 – Buffalo, Sheridan, Moorcroft	north terminus of concurrency with I-90 Bus.
Campbell		119.57	192.43	US 14 west / US 16 west – Sheridan	Northern terminus of concurrency with US 14 / US 16
Campbell		171.97	276.76	MT 59 north – Broadus	Montana state line
1.000 mi = 1.609 km; 1.000 km = 0.621 mi: Concurrency terminus

== Wyoming Highway 59 Connector ==
Wyoming Highway 59 Connector
- Location: Douglas
- Length: 0.45 mi (720 m)

Wyoming Highway 59 Connector is a 0.45-mile (0.7 km) long connector route of WYO 59 in Douglas. WYO 59C is the original alignment of Wyoming Highway 59 through Douglas. The route begins at WYO 59 and heads south 0.45 of a mile to meet WYO 59 (Fourth St.)
