= Louise Carter-King =

Former mayor of Gillette, Wyoming

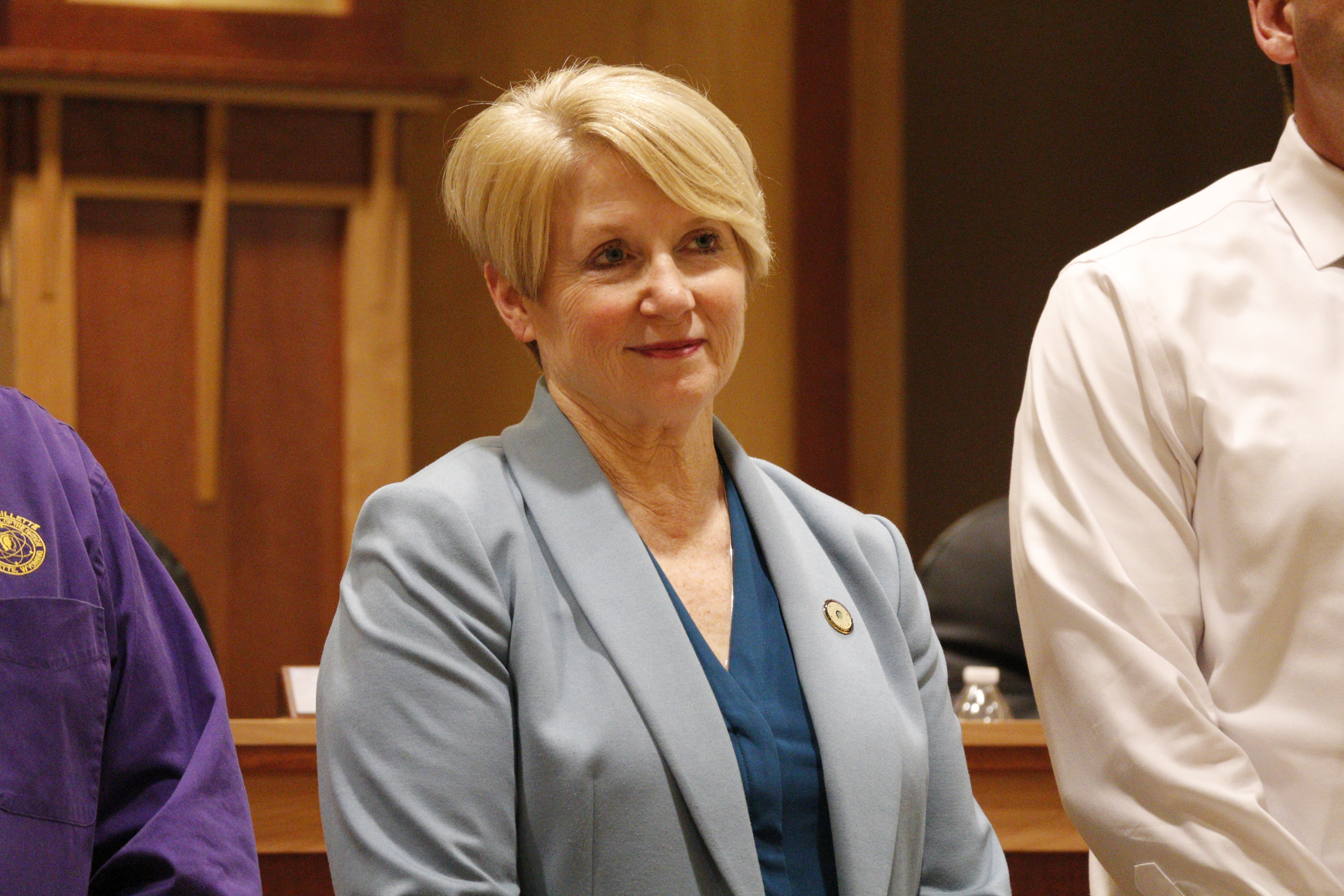
Carter-King at a 2018 ceremony for a veteran police officer

Louise Carter-King was the first female mayor of Gillette, Wyoming. Carter is frequently interviewed in international U.S. press because Gillete is a center of the coal industry in Wyoming.

== Family ==
Carter-King's's father, Herb Carter, was one of the previous mayors of the city. Her husband works in the coal industry.

== Positions ==
Carter-King resigned January 7, 2022. She stepped down over 500 "disparaging and disrespectful" texts and emails, ending an embattled and highly controversial two terms as mayor, starting in 2014. Ironically the mayor was instrumental in causing the resignation of Councilman Shay Lundvall over comments liked on a local citizens Facebook posts. Councilman Lundvall was reelected to the council with strong public support after his forced resignation.

=== Arts ===
Carter-King is supportive of the local arts industry.

=== Coal industry ===
Gillete is very dependent on coal mining and is a boom town at the center of the Wyoming fossil fuel industry. Carter-King has expressed opinions throughout her career about the coal industry.

After a 2017 policy change by president Trump loosening regulations on coal, Carter-King was mildly optimistic about how that would effect the local economy, while noting other trends causing the closure of coal companies.

The predicted return never came—a convergence of energy market changes favoring non-coal fossil fuels and reducing the viability of coal. After the 2020 elections, she expressed interest in talking with the Biden administration about how to recover jobs in Gillete due to the failing local coal industry. Carter-King acknowledges the larger forces that reversed the opportunities they were hoping for during the Trump administration.

=== Muslim rights ===
When anti-Muslim protestors attempted to prevent creation of a mosque in Gillete in 2016, Carter King supported rule of law and condemning discrimination.

== Controversies ==
After the city council rebuked a counselor for public sexist actions in June 2020, local community groups protested Carter-Kings administration. Carter-King resigned January 7, 2021[3]. She stepped down over 500 "disparaging and disrespectful" texts and emails, ending an embattled and highly controversial two terms as a mayor.
