= Rozet, Wyoming =

- Unincorporated community
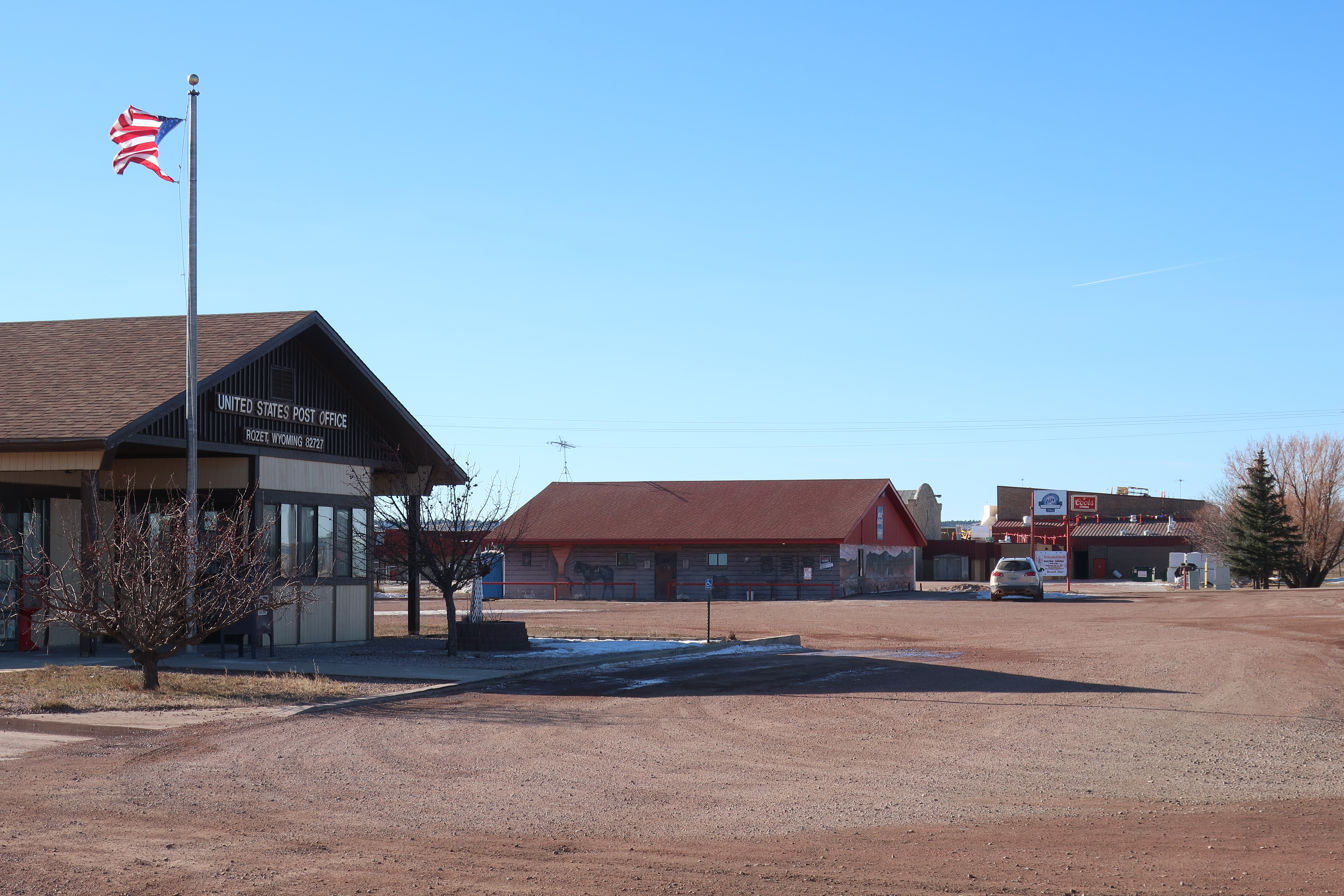
- United States Post Office and school in Rozet

- Location within the state of Wyoming Rozet (the United States)
- Coordinates: 44°16′41″N 105°12′22″W
- Country: United States
- State: Wyoming
- County: Campbell
- Time zone: UTC-7 (Mountain (MST))
  - Summer (DST): UTC-6 (MDT)
- ZIP code: 82727
- GNIS feature ID: 1597482

Rozet is an unincorporated community in Campbell County, Wyoming, United States. Founded in the 1890s, it was likely named for local populations of wild roses.

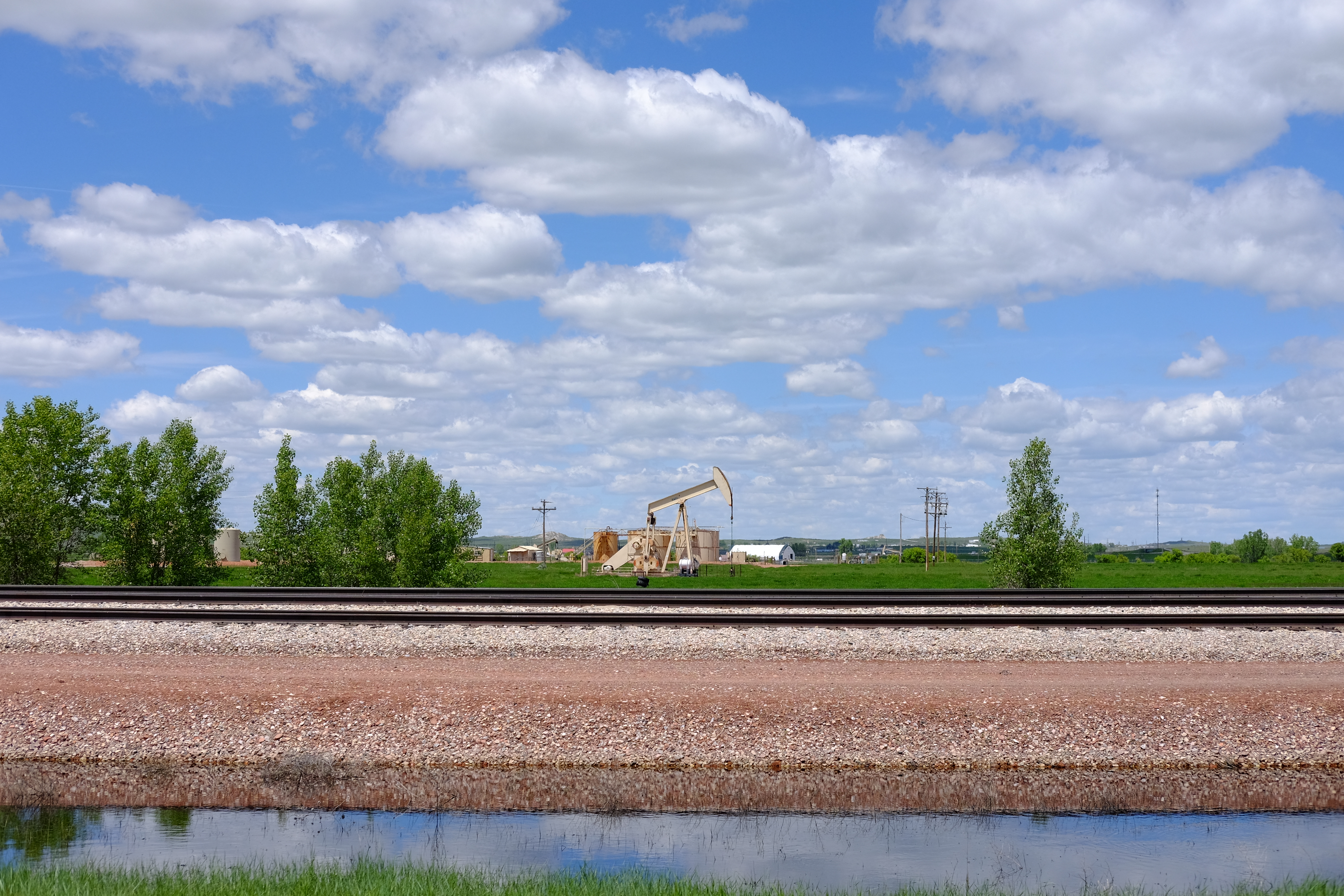
View from Wyoming Highway 51 in Rozet

Public education in the community of Rozet is provided by Campbell County School District #1.

Until 2020 BNSF operated a maintenance shop at nearby Donkey Creek. Several hundred surplus locomotives remained parked at Rozet.
