= Gillette, Wyoming =

City in Wyoming, United States

- City
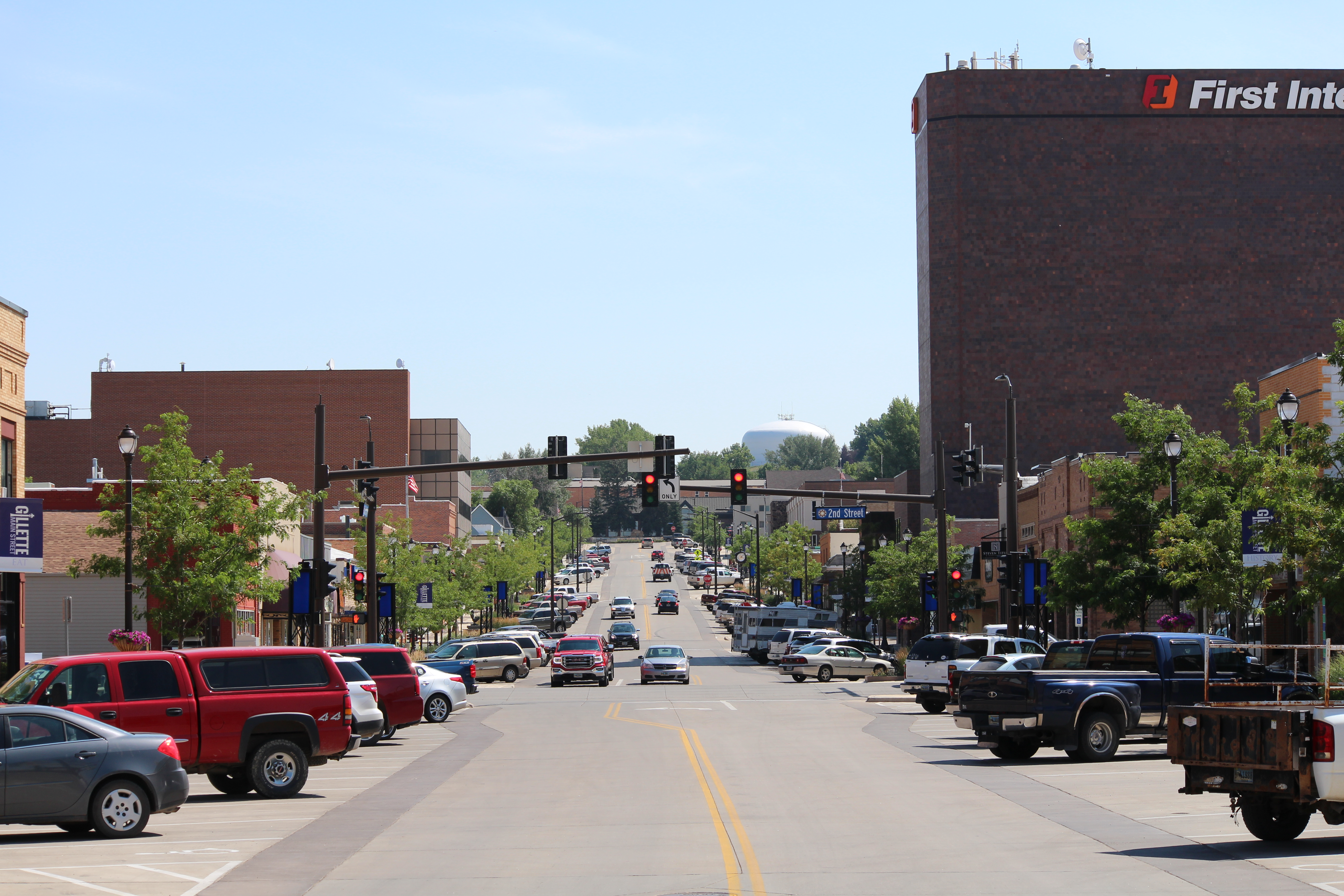
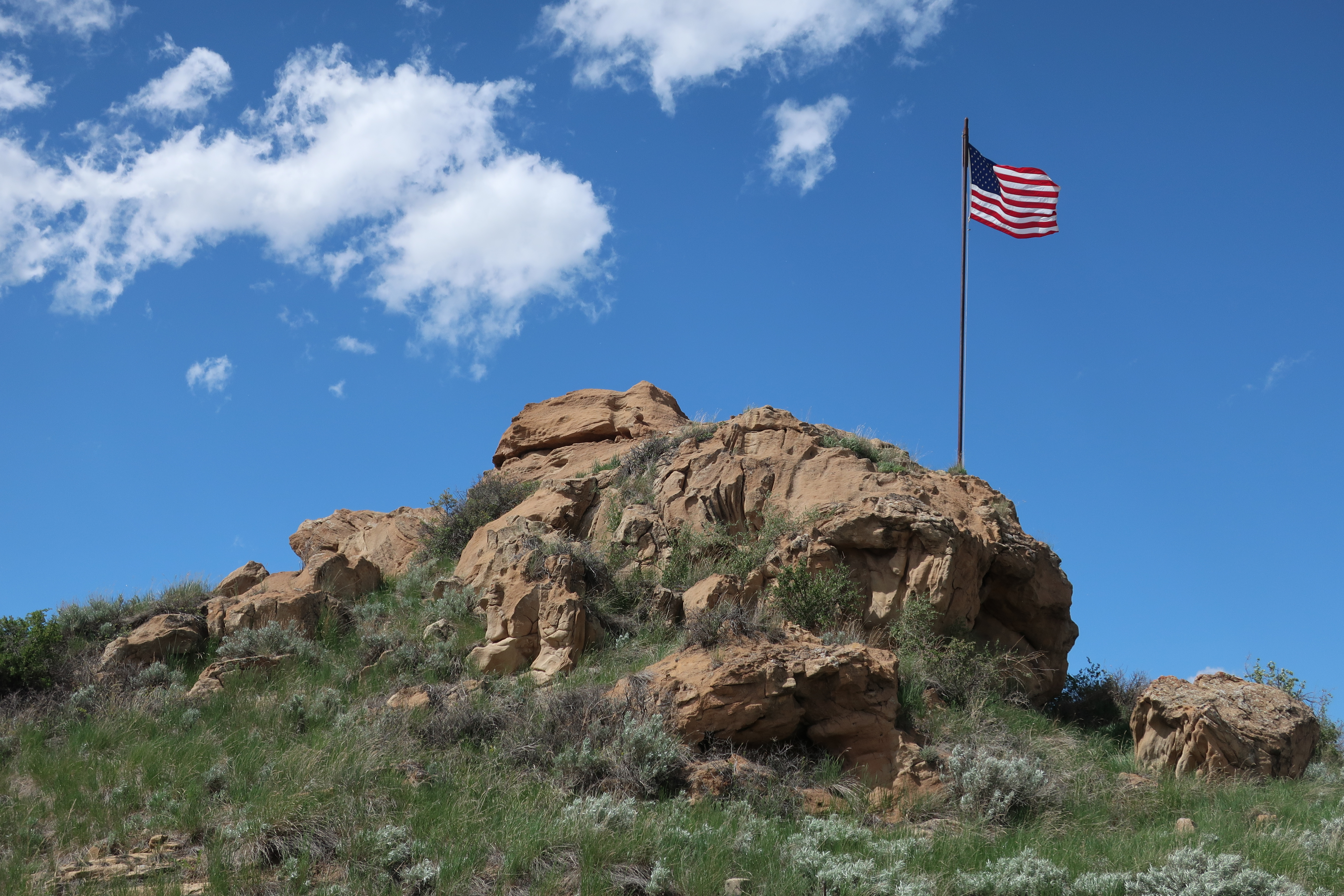
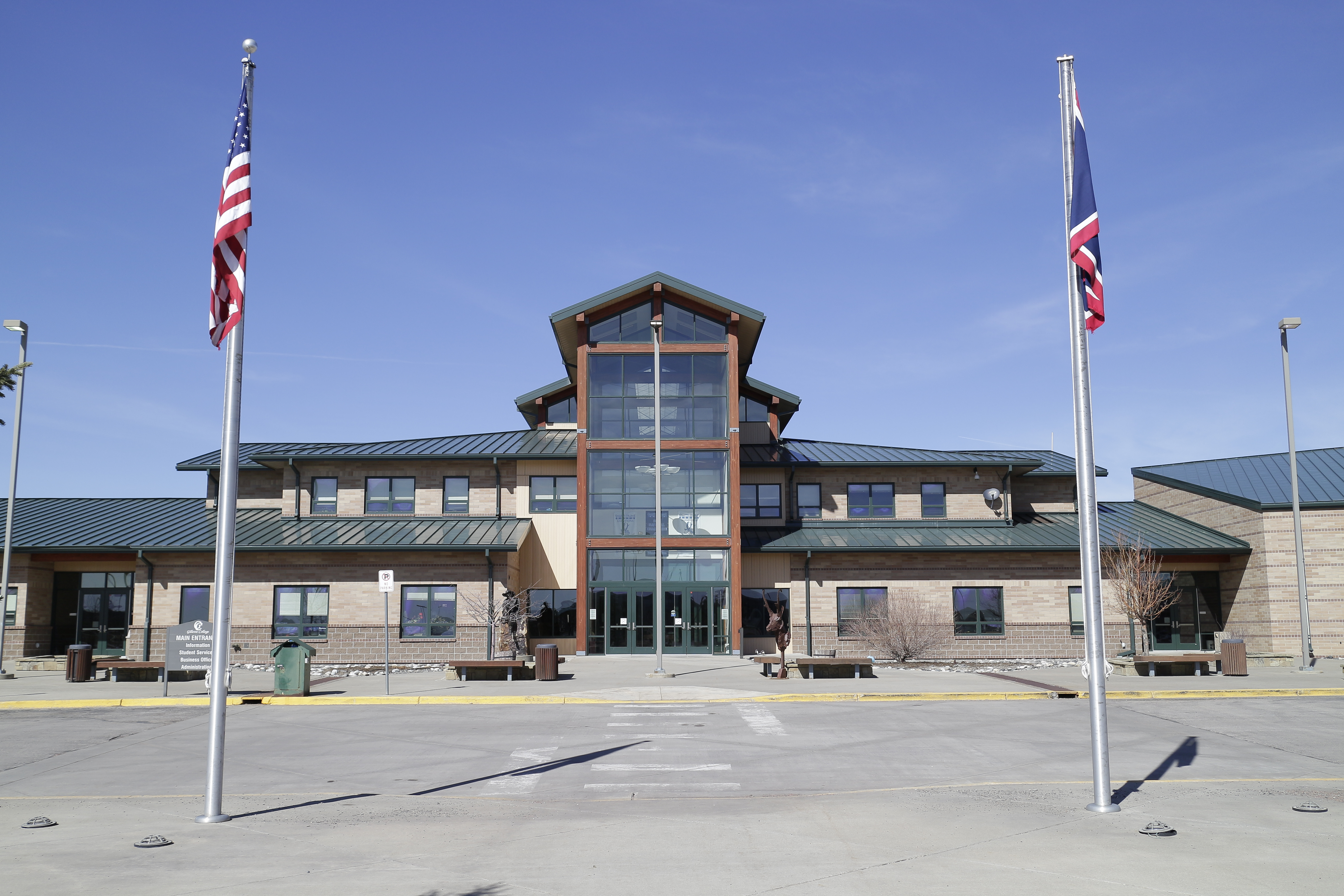
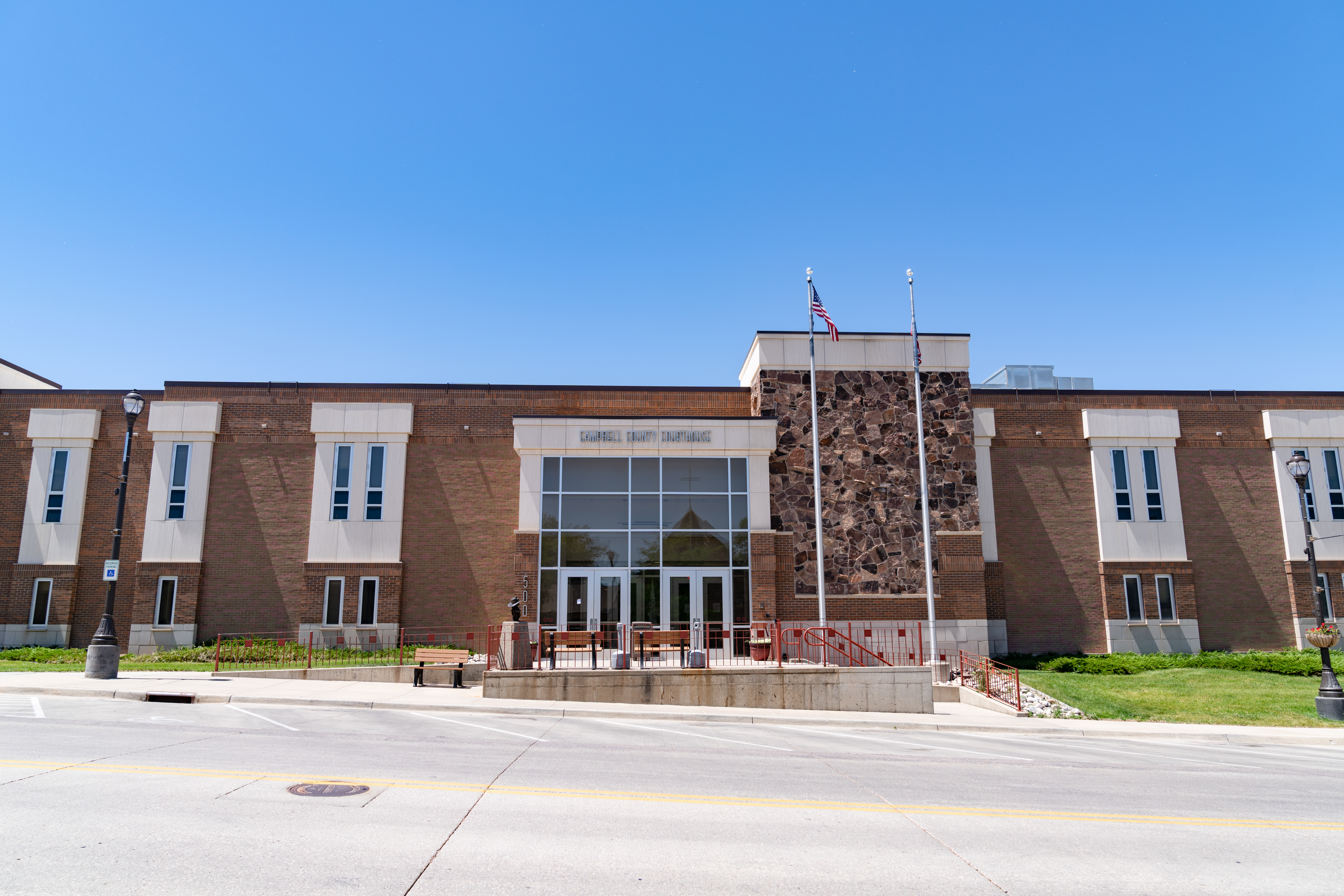
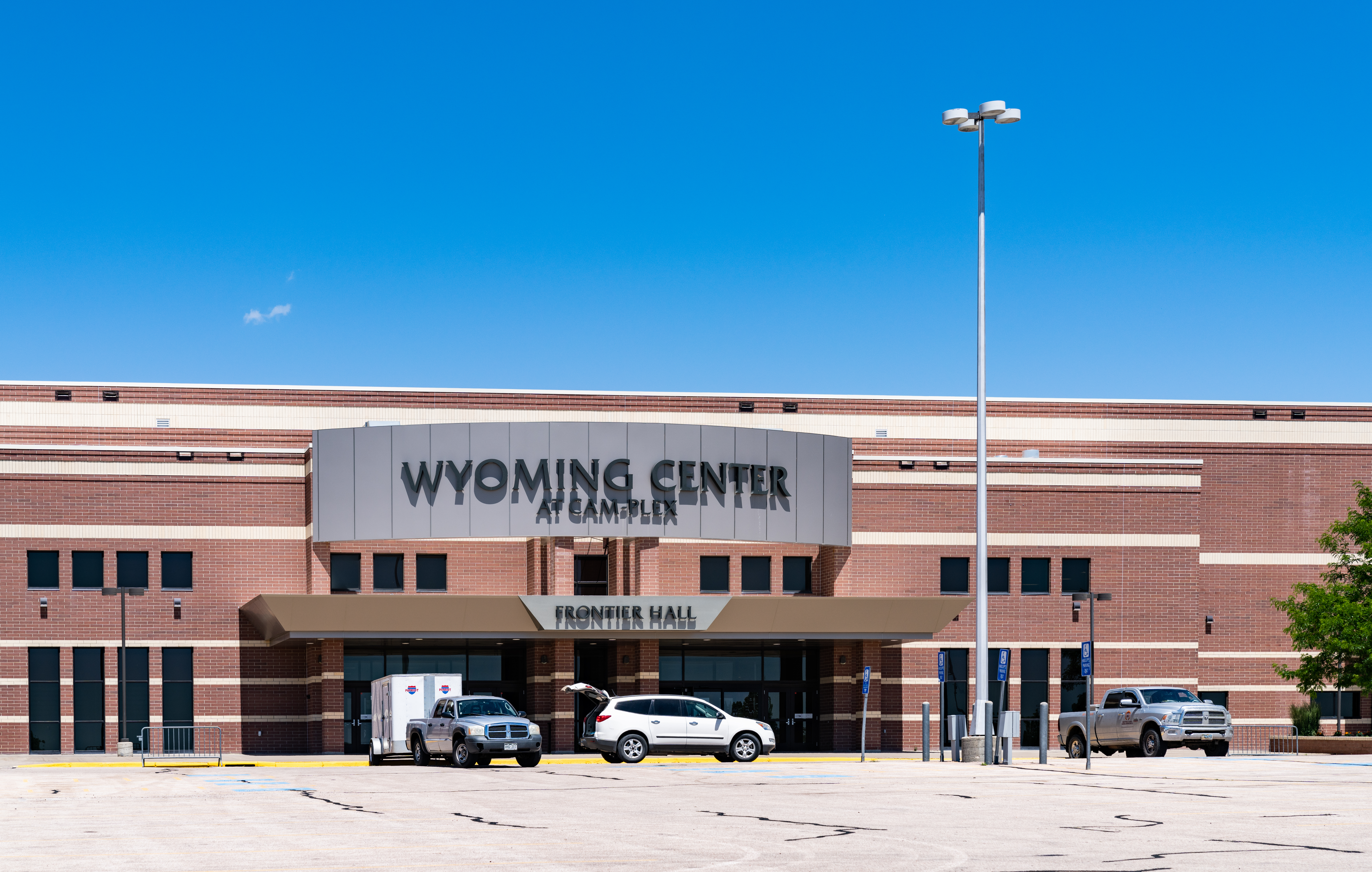
- Downtown Gillette The Rockpile Gillette College Campbell County Courthouse Wyoming Center at the CAM-PLEX

- Flag Seal
- Motto: "Energy Capital of the World"
- Location of Gillette in Campbell County, Wyoming
- Coordinates: 44°14′48″N 105°29′50″W
- Country: United States
- State: Wyoming
- County: Campbell

Government
  - Type: Mayor–Council
  - Body: Gillette City Council
  - Mayor: Shay Lundvall

Area
  - Total: 23.17 sq mi (60.01 km^{2})
  - Land: 23.13 sq mi (59.91 km^{2})
  - Water: 0.039 sq mi (0.10 km^{2})
- Elevation: 4,554 ft (1,388 m)

Population (2020)
  - Total: 33,403
  - Density: 1,384.7/sq mi (534.63/km^{2})
- Time zone: UTC−7 (Mountain (MST))
  - Summer (DST): UTC−6 (MDT)
- ZIP code: 82716-82718
- Area code: 307, exchanges 670, 682, 685-688
- FIPS code: 56-31855
- GNIS feature ID: 2410589
- Website: gillettewy.gov

Gillette (/dʒɪˈlɛt/, jih-LET) is a city in and the county seat of Campbell County, Wyoming, United States. The town was founded in 1891 as a major railway town on the Chicago, Burlington and Quincy Railroad.

The population was estimated at 33,496, as of July 1, 2023, making it the third-most populous city in Wyoming after Cheyenne and Casper. Gillette's population had increased 48% in the ten years after the 2000 census, which counted 19,646 residents, after a boom in its local fossil fuel industries.

Gillette is centrally located in an area devoted to the development of vast quantities of coal, oil, and coalbed methane gas. The city calls itself the "Energy Capital of the Nation", because Wyoming provides nearly 35% of the nation's coal. However, a decline in coal use in the U.S. in the first quarter of the 21st century has affected the state economy. Some local officials are seeking other industries or employment opportunities. As a major economic hub for the county, the city is also a regional center for media, education, health, and arts.

== History ==
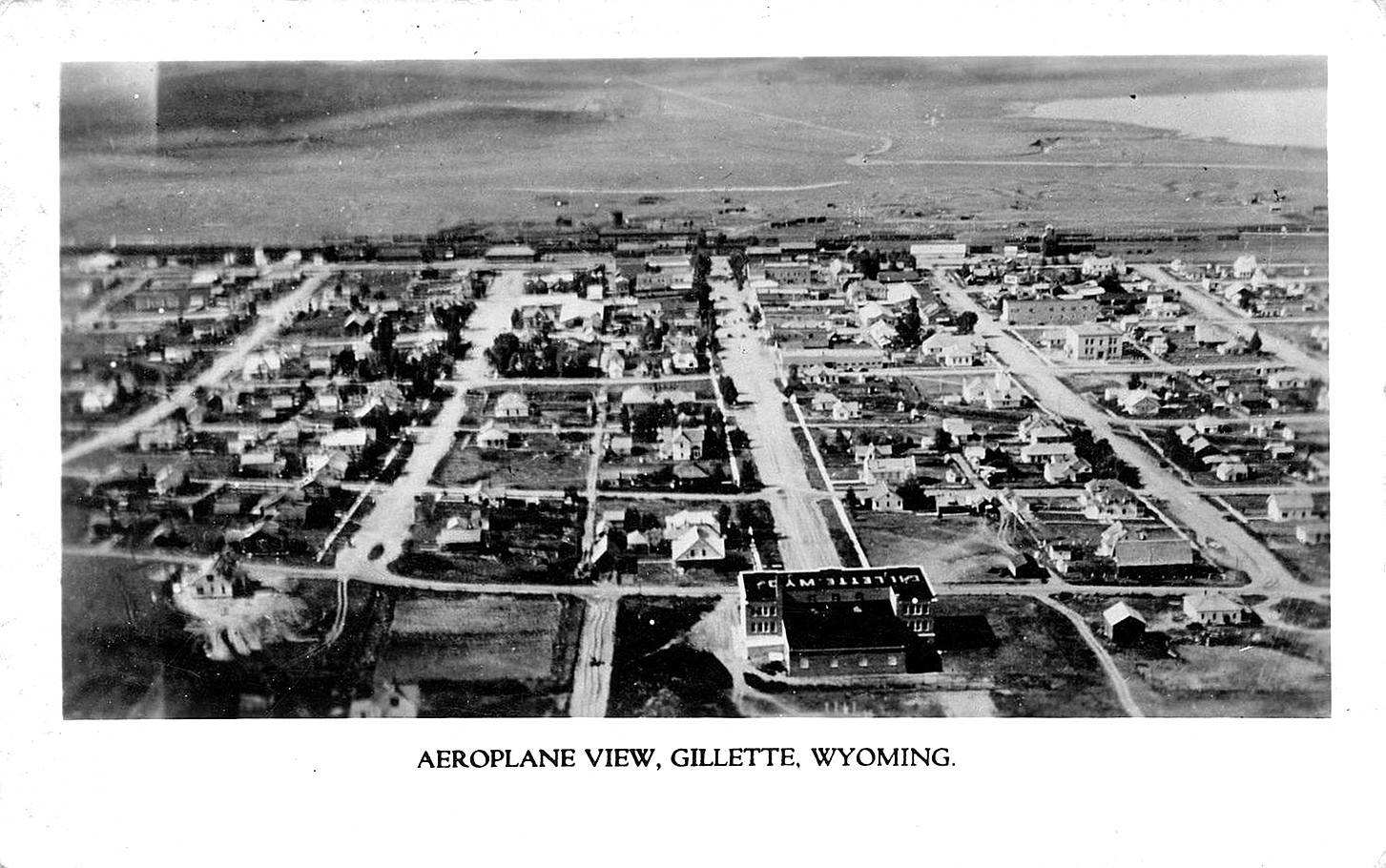
Postcard with an aerial view of Gillette around 1930

Before its founding, Gillette started as Donkey Town, named after Donkey Creek. The settlement moved and was called Rocky Pile, after Rocky Draw.

Gillette was founded in 1891 with the coming of the Chicago, Burlington & Quincy Railroad and incorporated on January 6, 1892, less than two years after Wyoming became a state. Chicago, Burlington & Quincy Railroad changed the name of the terminus to Gillette, after Edward Gillette, a surveyor for the company.

In November 1895, a fire destroyed most of the town. Only two saloons, two stores, and a restaurant survived. A group of families from Mathews County, Virginia, and Gloucester County, Virginia, settled in the town between 1895 and 1905, all of whom were members of the Episcopal Church. They established an Episcopal congregation, and the church continues to the present.

During this same era, a group of immigrants from County Antrim, Ireland (in what has since become Northern Ireland) also settled in Gillette. They were Presbyterians of Scottish descent; this population was referred to as "Scots-Irish" in the United States. This was not a term used in Ireland.

Norwegian immigrants arrived in the town during the same era, all of whom were Lutheran. There were also a small group of settlers from rural New England, these were old stock "Yankee" New Englanders who were members of the Congregational church.

In 1974, U.S. psychologist ElDean Kohrs used the town as the basic example of what he called the Gillette syndrome This is the social disruption that can occur in a community due to rapid population growth. During the 1960s, Gillette's population had doubled from 3,580 to 7,194 because of growth in the energy industry. Kohrs proposed that this fast increase caused increased crime, high costs of living, and weakened social and community bonds. Some of Kohrs's claims about the energy industry's influence have been disputed, since similar increases in divorce rates, welfare usage, and crime were also seen in other rapidly growing areas of the country, where the catalysts were different..

Rapid growth has taken place in the 21st century. Gillette annexed the census-designated place Antelope Valley-Crestview on January 1, 2018. Antelope Valley-Crestview's population was 1,658 at the 2010 census and it had an area of 4.9 mi^{2} (12.7 km^{²}).

== Geography ==
Gillette is situated between the Bighorn Mountains to the west and the Black Hills to the east, in the Powder River Basin.

According to the United States Census Bureau, the city has an area of 19.00 square miles (49.21 km^{2}), of which 18.97 square miles (49.13 km^{2}) are land and 0.03 square miles (0.08 km^{2}) is water.

Few trees were in Gillette when it was founded. The native trees, box elder and cottonwood, were found along creeks. The oldest surviving non-native trees were planted in the 1940s. The earliest were almost exclusively elm, cottonwood, white poplar, green ash, Colorado blue spruce, and ponderosa pine. In the 1960s, crab apples, honey locust, catalpa, European mountain-ash, and other evergreens were planted. Nurseries started to sell trees in the 1970s, which further increased tree diversity.

=== Skyline ===
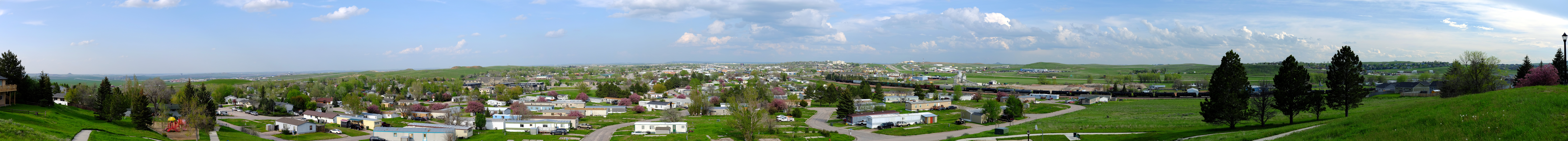
Gillette seen from Overlook Park showing much of the city north of Interstate 90
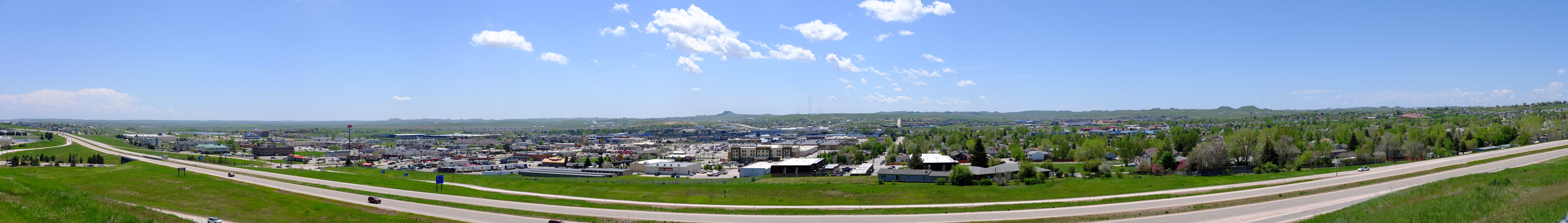
View from Mount Pisgah Cemetery showing the city south of Interstate 90

=== Climate ===
Gillette has a borderline humid continental (Köppen: Dfa) and cool semi-arid (Köppen: BSk) climate characterised by hot summers with pleasant mornings, and generally very cold, though very variable, winters. The city lies in USDA plant hardiness zone 5a (−20 to −15 °F; −29 to −26 °C).

Climate data for Gillette 4SE, Wyoming (1991–2020 normals, extremes 1902–present)
Month	Jan	Feb	Mar	Apr	May	Jun	Jul	Aug	Sep	Oct	Nov	Dec	Year
Record high °F (°C)	67 (19)	70 (21)	82 (28)	91 (33)	95 (35)	107 (42)	110 (43)	106 (41)	102 (39)	98 (37)	81 (27)	72 (22)	110 (43)
Mean maximum °F (°C)	53.4 (11.9)	55.3 (12.9)	68.8 (20.4)	76.9 (24.9)	84.2 (29.0)	92.4 (33.6)	98.0 (36.7)	96.0 (35.6)	91.9 (33.3)	80.2 (26.8)	66.2 (19.0)	53.8 (12.1)	99.0 (37.2)
Mean daily maximum °F (°C)	36.2 (2.3)	37.6 (3.1)	48.7 (9.3)	56.4 (13.6)	65.9 (18.8)	77.0 (25.0)	86.4 (30.2)	85.4 (29.7)	75.3 (24.1)	59.2 (15.1)	46.2 (7.9)	35.8 (2.1)	59.2 (15.1)
Daily mean °F (°C)	26.0 (−3.3)	27.2 (−2.7)	36.7 (2.6)	44.1 (6.7)	53.4 (11.9)	63.6 (17.6)	71.7 (22.1)	70.6 (21.4)	60.8 (16.0)	46.8 (8.2)	35.2 (1.8)	25.9 (−3.4)	46.8 (8.2)
Mean daily minimum °F (°C)	15.8 (−9.0)	16.8 (−8.4)	24.8 (−4.0)	31.7 (−0.2)	41.0 (5.0)	50.2 (10.1)	57.0 (13.9)	55.7 (13.2)	46.4 (8.0)	34.4 (1.3)	24.1 (−4.4)	16.1 (−8.8)	34.5 (1.4)
Mean minimum °F (°C)	−9.9 (−23.3)	−7.2 (−21.8)	2.3 (−16.5)	14.0 (−10.0)	26.2 (−3.2)	37.0 (2.8)	46.7 (8.2)	43.1 (6.2)	30.6 (−0.8)	14.7 (−9.6)	−0.2 (−17.9)	−7.6 (−22.0)	−17.7 (−27.6)
Record low °F (°C)	−36 (−38)	−40 (−40)	−23 (−31)	−12 (−24)	11 (−12)	28 (−2)	35 (2)	31 (−1)	10 (−12)	−12 (−24)	−26 (−32)	−37 (−38)	−40 (−40)
Average precipitation inches (mm)	0.59 (15)	0.78 (20)	1.13 (29)	2.13 (54)	3.27 (83)	2.54 (65)	1.68 (43)	1.38 (35)	1.25 (32)	1.57 (40)	0.63 (16)	0.64 (16)	17.59 (447)
Average snowfall inches (cm)	8.2 (21)	9.0 (23)	8.6 (22)	9.4 (24)	1.3 (3.3)	0.1 (0.25)	0.0 (0.0)	0.0 (0.0)	0.5 (1.3)	4.4 (11)	5.8 (15)	8.4 (21)	55.7 (141)
Average precipitation days (≥ 0.01 in)	7.5	7.9	7.9	10.9	12.5	10.4	8.4	6.4	6.2	8.4	6.2	6.9	99.6
Average snowy days (≥ 0.1 in)	6.5	6.3	5.1	3.9	0.6	0.1	0.0	0.0	0.3	2.4	3.9	6.1	35.2
Source: NOAA

== Demographics ==
Historical population
Census	Pop.	Note	%±
1900	151		—
1910	448		196.7%
1920	1,157		158.3%
1930	1,340		15.8%
1940	2,177		62.5%
1950	2,191		0.6%
1960	3,580		63.4%
1970	7,194		100.9%
1980	12,134		68.7%
1990	17,635		45.3%
2000	19,646		11.4%
2010	29,087		48.1%
2020	33,403		14.8%

=== Racial and ethnic composition ===
Racial makeup	2020	2010	2000
White	85.3%	92.2%	95.5%
Black or African American	0.6%	0.4%	0.2%
American Indian and Alaska Native	1.5%	1.2%	1.0%
Asian	0.9%	0.7%	0.4%
Native Hawaiian and Other Pacific Islander	0.1%	0.0%	0.1%
Other race	4.8%	3.2%	1.3%
Two or more races	6.8%	2.2%	1.5%
Hispanic or Latino (of any race)	10.3%	9.5%	3.9%

=== 2020 census ===
As of the 2020 census, Gillette had a population of 33,403. The median age was 33.1 years. 28.9% of residents were under the age of 18 and 10.3% of residents were 65 years of age or older. For every 100 females there were 101.5 males, and for every 100 females age 18 and over there were 102.1 males age 18 and over.

97.8% of residents lived in urban areas, while 2.2% lived in rural areas.

There were 12,751 households in Gillette, of which 37.7% had children under the age of 18 living in them. Of all households, 47.2% were married-couple households, 21.3% were households with a male householder and no spouse or partner present, and 21.9% were households with a female householder and no spouse or partner present. About 26.7% of all households were made up of individuals and 7.5% had someone living alone who was 65 years of age or older.

There were 14,089 housing units, of which 9.5% were vacant. The homeowner vacancy rate was 2.3% and the rental vacancy rate was 13.1%.

Racial composition as of the 2020 census
Race	Number	Percent
White	28,487	85.3%
Black or African American	215	0.6%
American Indian and Alaska Native	515	1.5%
Asian	288	0.9%
Native Hawaiian and Other Pacific Islander	20	0.1%
Some other race	1,616	4.8%
Two or more races	2,262	6.8%
Hispanic or Latino (of any race)	3,449	10.3%

=== 2010 census ===
As of the census of 2010, 29,087 people, 10,975 households, and 7,299 families resided in the city. The population density was 1,533.3 inhabitants per square mile (592.0/km^{2}). The 12,153 housing units averaged 640.6 per square mile (247.3/km^{2}). The racial makeup of the city was 92.2% White, 0.4% African American, 1.2% Native American, 0.7% Asian, 3.2% from other races, and 2.2% from two or more races. Hispanics or Latinos of any race were 9.5% of the population.

Of the 10,975 households, 38.9% had children under the age of 18 living with them, 49.2% were married couples living together, 10.3% had a female householder with no husband present, 7.0% had a male householder with no wife present, and 33.5% were not families. About 24.3% of all households were made up of individuals, and 4.7% had someone living alone who was 65 years of age or older. The average household size was 2.61 and the average family size was 3.09.

The median age in the city was 30.6 years. 28% of residents were under the age of 18; 10.9% were 18 to 24; 30.6% were 25 to 44; 24.8% were 45 to 64; and 5.8% were 65 years of age or older. The gender makeup of the city was 52.3% male and 47.7% female.

=== 2000 census ===
As of 2000, the median income for a household in the city was $69,581, and for a family was $78,377. Males had a median income of $41,131 versus $22,717 for females. The per capita income for the city was $19,749. About 5.7% of families and 7.9% of the population were below the poverty line, including 6.2% of those under age 18 and 14.1% of those age 65 or over.

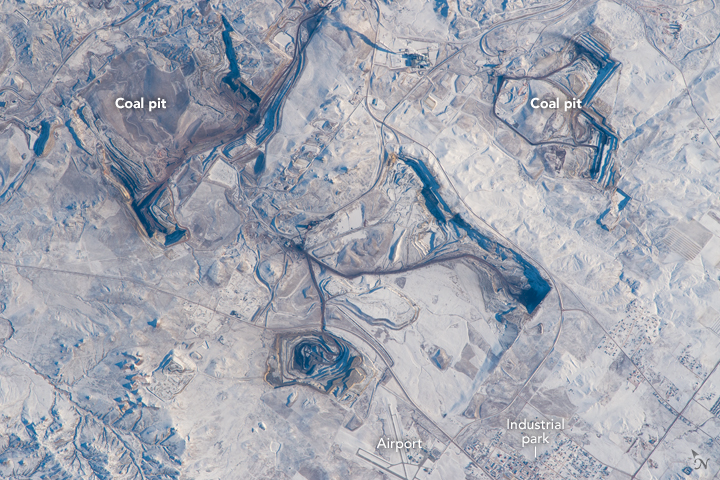
Coal mines near Gillette, from ISS, 2015

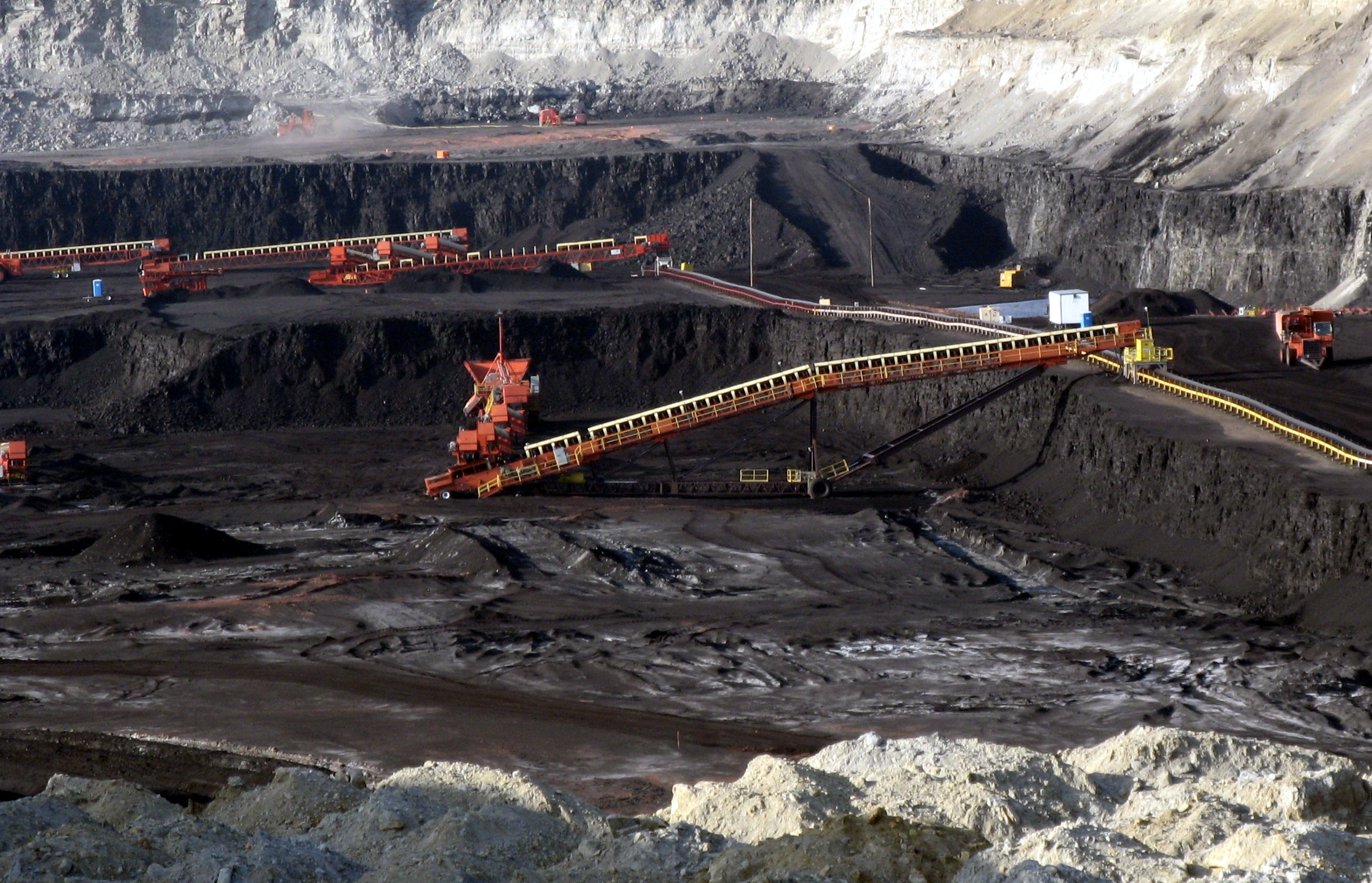
A large surface coal mine near Gillette

== Arts and culture ==
The volunteer board called the Mayor's Art Council runs the Avenues of Art program. The program pays artists to display sculptures for sale. Each year newly selected works are shown at the Donkey Creek Festival, where visitors can meet the artists. 113 sculptures are currently on display through the Avenues of Art program and 289 have been shown since 2004. Participating artists have included Jane DeDecker, Gary Lee Price, and Benjamin Victor. This program was dissolved by the Gillette City Council on January 16, 2024.

A second program, Sculpture Walk, is operated by the Sculpture Committee. Started in 2018, it pays artists to display their sculptures for sale at Mount Pisgah Cemetery.

The city chose to increase investment in the arts program during the Great Recession and mayor Louise Carter-King describes the investment as a quality of life one.

=== Annual cultural events ===
A free multi-day event, Donkey Creek Festival is held in every June at the Gillette College. It includes the Avenues of Arts reception, concert, car and motorcycle show, disc golf tournament, and 5K run and walk. There are art and food vendors and alcohol is available at a beer garden. The festival has grown significantly since starting in 2006. Initially a jazz concert, it evolved into a multi-day music festival that ran for approximately 16 years, from 2006 to 2022 it was held annually in June at Gillette College. It was suspended in 2022 due to a lack of funding and board members - it was brought back as a one day event starting in 2024 and is now held at Big Lost Meadery in downtown Gillette.

The Gillette chapter of PFLAG hosts an annual pride event to support the local LGBTQ community. Previous years have included a potluck, picnic, and bowling. In 2019, PFLAG held the Pride Drag Show at AVA Community Art Center as part of its pride event.

=== Tourism ===
In 2021, 7,338 people visited the Gillette Convention and Visitors Bureau. While hunters always use the center, most visitors asked about coal mine tours and museums. Of the 569 visitors in 2018 who identified where they were from, 473 were from 46 states and 96 were from 23 other countries.

== Sports ==
=== Wyoming Center at the CAM-PLEX ===
The Wyoming Center at the CAM-PLEX is a 9,000 seat event center located just outside of Gillette. Ground was broken in 2006 and it was completed in 2008.

It hosts both sporting and community events. The center can be divided into 3 rooms by using moveable soundproof walls; which retract if more space is needed for a certain event. More walls can further divide the center into 9 rooms.

The Frontier and Equality Halls (located in the west and middle parts of the center, respectively) are used for various purposes; while the Spirit Hall (located on the east side) is used for ice skating and hockey. As stated before, it can be taken down should an event need more space.

The center currently hosts the National High School Finals Rodeo, amateur wrestling, and are hosts for the Wyoming Cavalry, of American Indoor Football. The Cavalry use the Equality Hall of the CAM-PLEX for their home games. The seating capacity is 4,000 for Cavalry games. It once hosted the Gillette Mustangs, formerly of Champions Indoor Football.

Wyoming Center at the CAM-PLEX
- Location within Wyoming Location within the United States
- Location: 1635 Reata Dr, Gillette, WY 82718
- Owner: City of Gillette
- Operator: CAM-PLEX Events Center
- Capacity: 9,000 (4,000 for Mustangs games)

Construction
- Groundbreaking: 2006
- Opened: 2008
- Cost: $42 million
- Architect: Schutz Foss Architects

Tenants
- Gillette/Wyoming Mustangs (CIF) (2021–2023); Wyoming Cavalry (AIF) (2026-beyond)

Website
- www.cam-plex.com/business/cam-plex-wyoming-center

=== Other facilities ===
The Campbell County Recreation Center is a 190,000-ft^{2} facility that was established April 2010. This facility includes a 42-ft climbing wall resembling the Devils Tower National Monument. Also, an 81,000-ft^{2} field house that contains basketball courts, a six-lane track, swimming and diving facilities, and five indoor tennis courts.

The Campbell County Ice Arena contains an ice rink for ice hockey and ice skating plus an area for curling.

The Energy Capital Sports Complex site has four fast-pitch softball fields that can be converted for Little League baseball. The fields use Slitfilm synthetic turf with sand-rubber infill. A 28,000-ft^{2} protected spectator viewing area has a grass play area. A 2.4-mi recreation trail runs around the complex. Since the grand opening in 2015, the complex has hosted many tournaments, including the Razor City Showcase softball tournament and the 2016 Wyoming ASA State softball tournament.

== Government ==
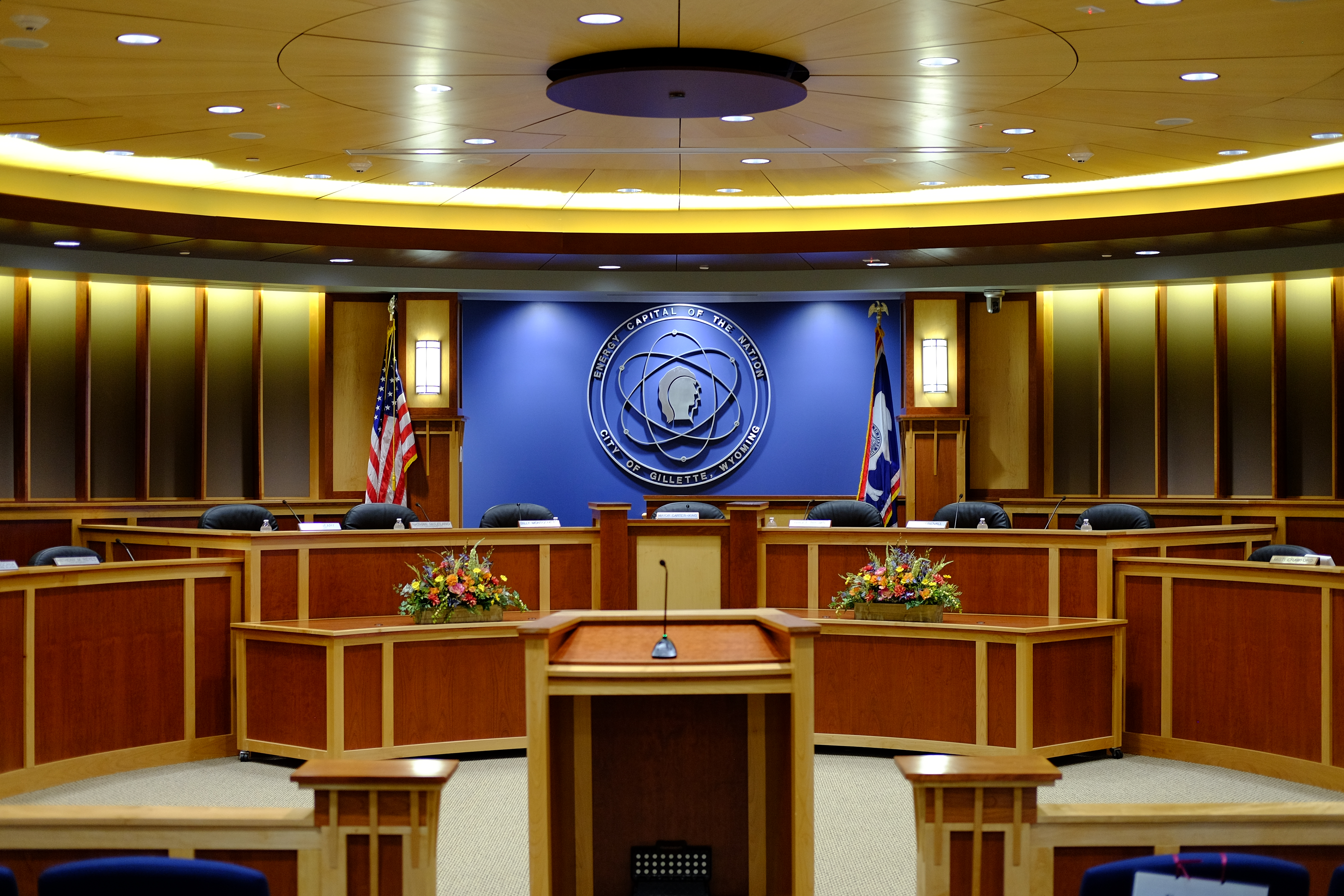
City Council chamber at City Hall

Gillette is governed by an elected mayor and a city council of six members. Gillette is split into three wards, each represented by two council members. The mayor and council members serve four-year terms.

Under the mayor and city council, the city government consists of the city attorney, municipal court, and city administration. The city administration consists of several departments and their divisions. The departments are Human Resources, Finance, Police, Development Services, Public Works, and Utilities.

The city council holds regular sessions on first and third Tuesday of every month in the Council Chambers at City Hall. The council also holds agenda review meetings and meetings before regular sessions. All meetings are open to the public except executive sessions. The council members are Gregory Schreurs and Tricia Simonson for Ward 1, Tim Carsrud and Billy Montgomery for Ward 2, Nathan McLeland and Shay Lundvall for Ward 3.

The sale and production of liquor is regulated by the city. The number of licenses is capped by population by state law and due to scarcity have been sold privately for as much as $300,000.

== Education ==
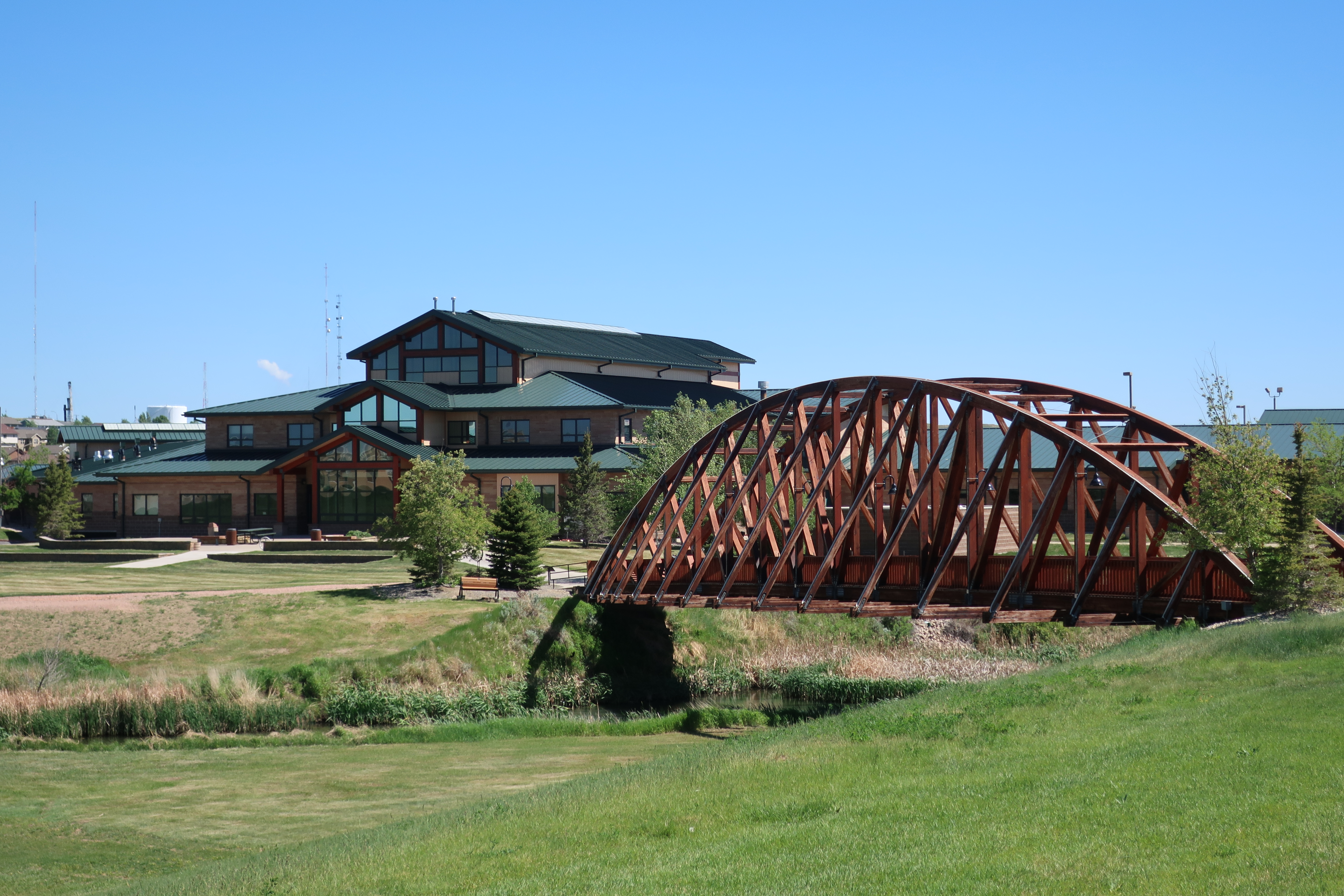
Gillette College main building and bridge over Donkey Creek

Public education in Gillette is provided by Campbell County School District Number 1. It is home to Campbell County High School and Thunder Basin High School. Gillette College, a two-year college, is part of the Northern Wyoming Community College District.

Gillette has a public library, a branch of the Campbell County Public Library System.

== Media ==
Gillette has one newspaper, the Gillette News Record, published by Ann Kennedy Turner. It was originally two papers, the Gillette News and the Campbell County Record. The News-Record became a daily on July 14, 1975.

Over the air digital television stations available in Gillette include KOPA-CD on RF Channel 9 (ABC). Wyoming Public Television (PBS) is available on K26NL-D, channel 26. CBS programming from Casper, Wyoming can be seen on channel 16, K16AE-D. NBC programming from Rapid City, South Dakota is available on channel 22, K22AD-D. Gillette also receives a moderate signal from KHSD-TV (Fox) on channel 5, and a weak signal from KQME (MeTV) on channel 11 and KSGW-TV ABC on channel 12.

Gillette Public Access Television is Gillette's only TV station. It is a traditional PEG cable-access station operated by the city. It can be viewed on Charter Communications Cable channels 189 (Education), 190 (Public Access) and 192 (Government).

== Infrastructure ==
=== Healthcare ===
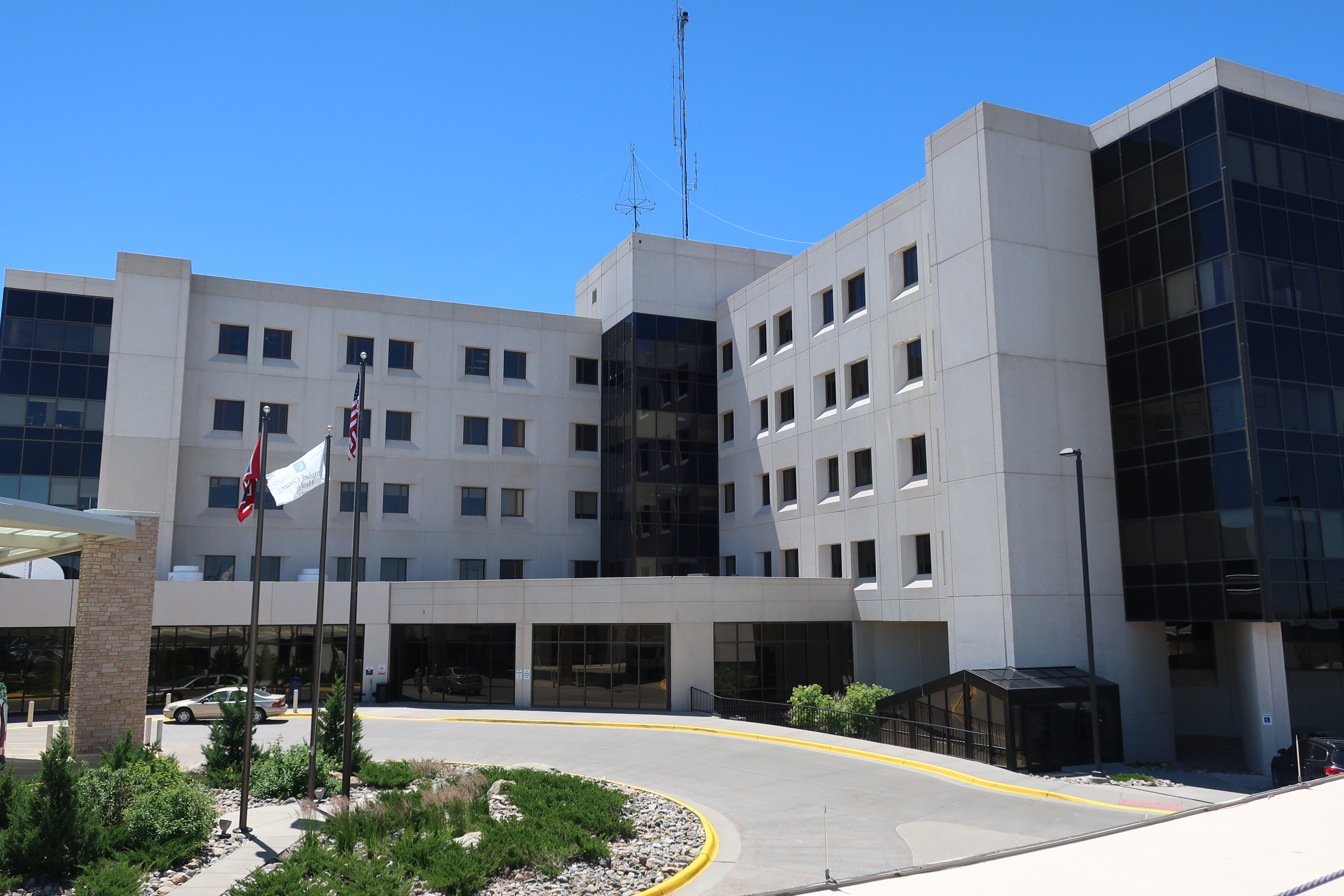
Campbell County Memorial Hospital

Campbell County Memorial Hospital in Gillette is part of Campbell County Health. The hospital has 90 beds for acute care and is certified as an area trauma hospital.

=== Police ===
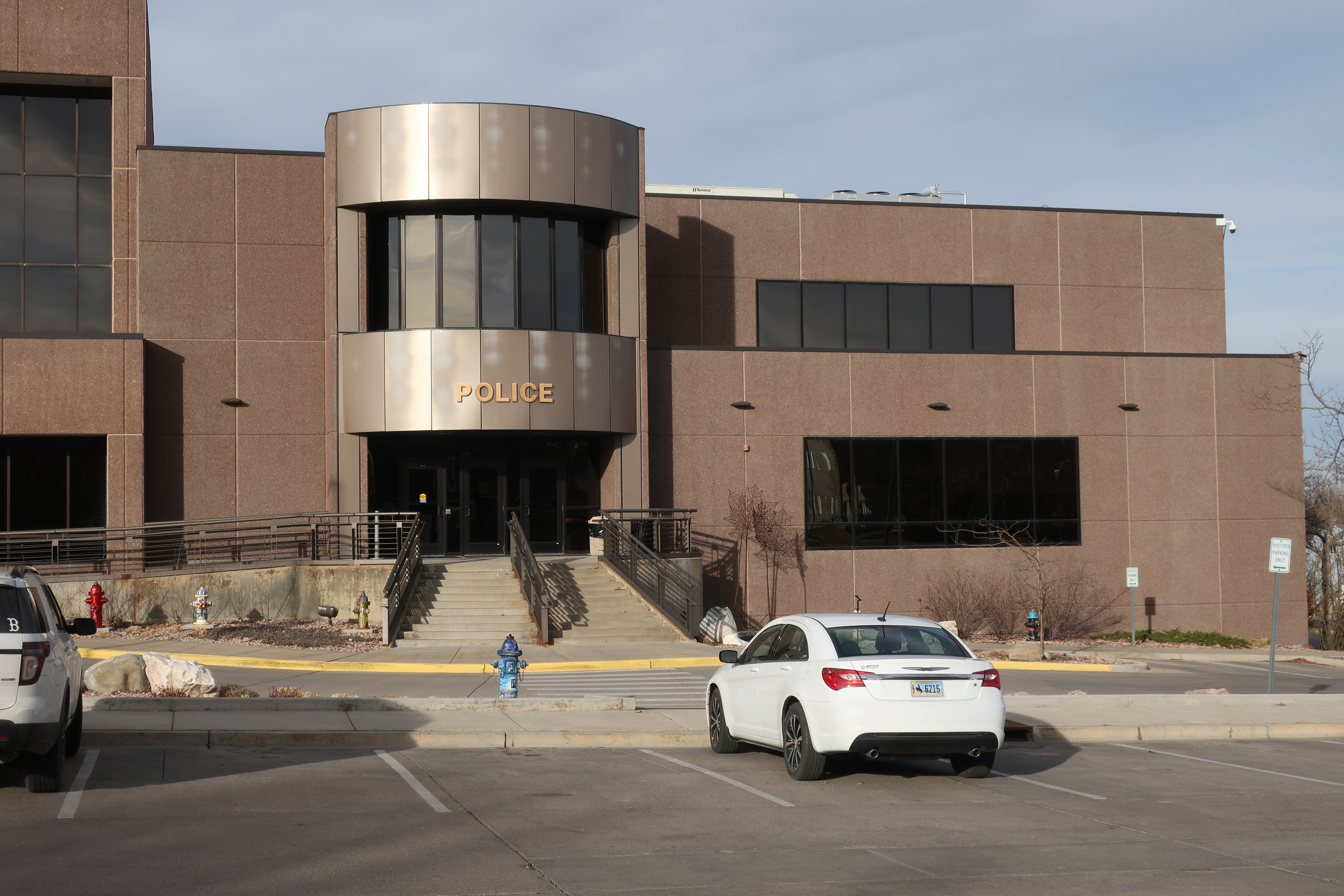
Gillette Police Department

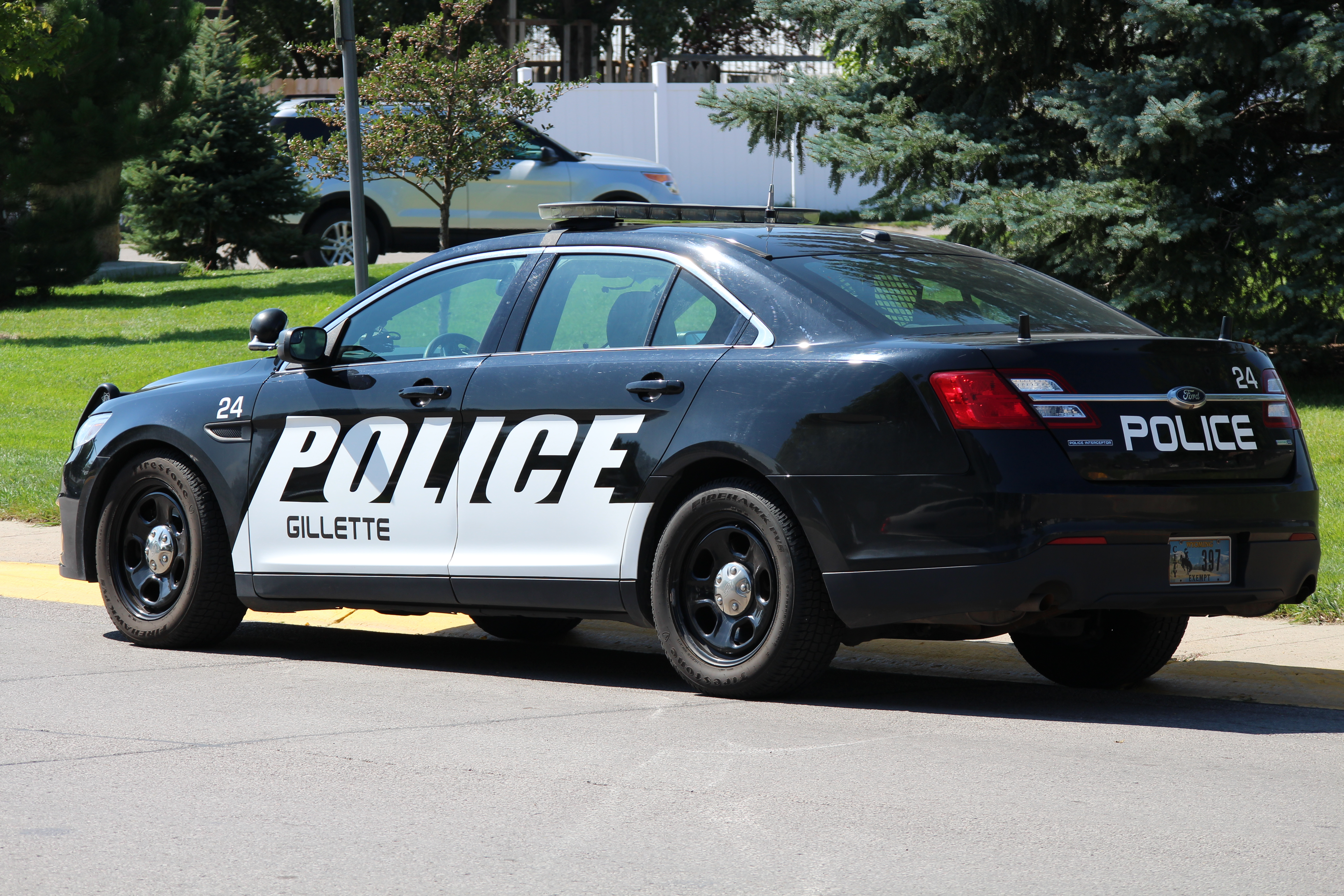
Black version of patrol car

The Gillette Police Department consists of several divisions including Administration, Animal Control, Communications Center, Detectives Division which includes school resource officers (SRO), Evidence, Patrol Division, Records, and Victim Services. Police headquarters are located in City Hall, but the Animal Control division is located at the Animal Shelter on 950 W Warlow Dr. It consists of one Animal Control Supervisor, three Animal Control Officers, and two Animal Shelter Assistants. In addition to enforcing animal-related ordinances Animal Control sells pet licenses and acts as an animal shelter both housing pets and providing adoption services.

=== Military ===
At Gillette is a Wyoming National Guard armory. The A Battery, 2nd Battalion, 300th Field Artillery of the Wyoming National Guard are based in Casper, Gillette, and Lander. Also, the High Mobility Artillery Rocket System unit is based in Gillette. In recent years, soldiers from the 2nd Battalion, 300th Field Artillery have been deployed for Operation Iraqi Freedom, Operation Enduring Freedom, and Operation Freedom's Sentinel.

=== Transportation ===
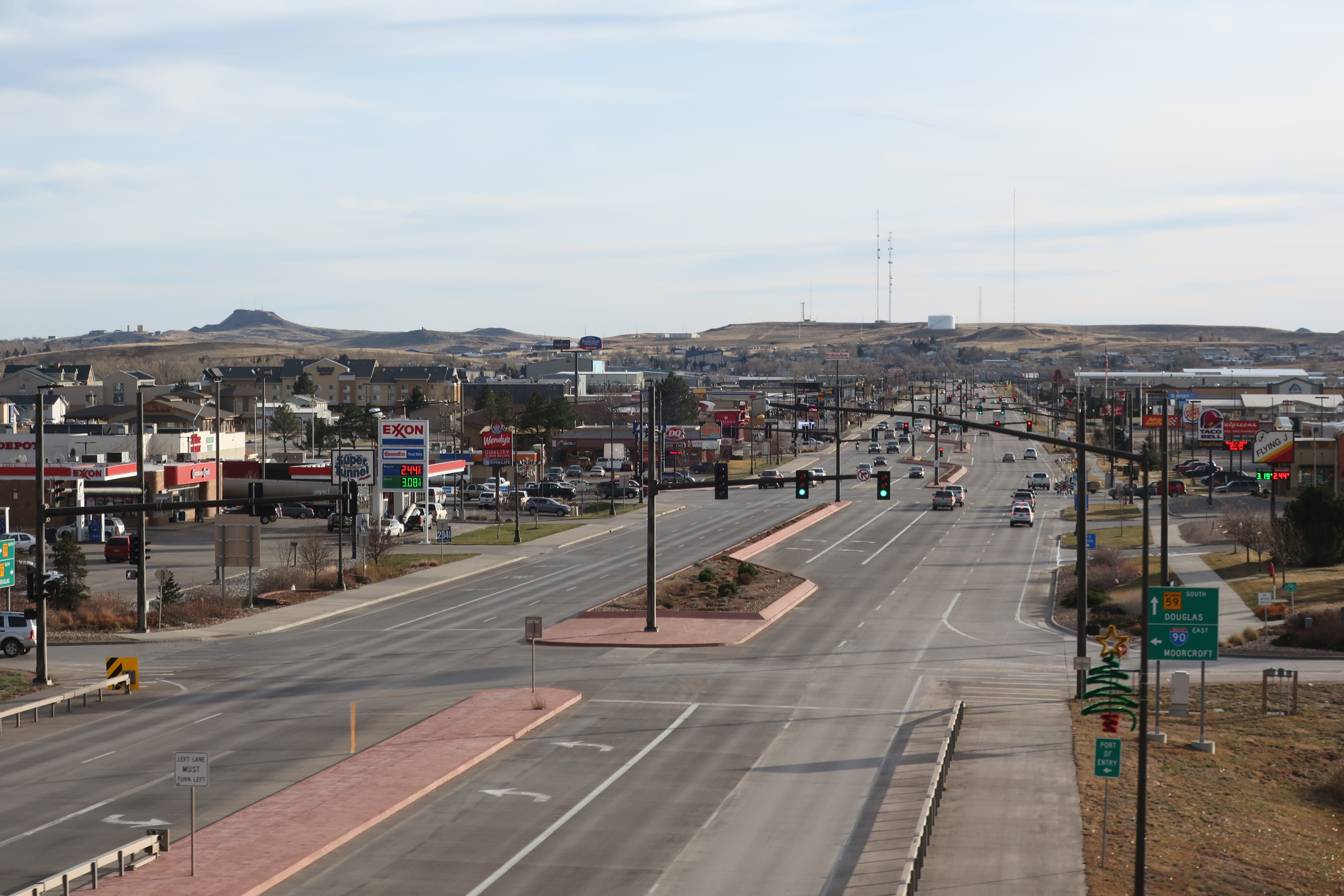
Wyoming Highway 59 seen from Interstate 90 in Gillette

Northeast Wyoming Regional Airport (GCC) is served by United Airlines operated by SkyWest Airlines. SkyWest currently operates six flights daily in and out of Gillette to Denver.

Intercity bus service to the city is provided by Jefferson Lines.

==== Highways ====
- I-90
- I-90 BL
- US 14
- US 16
- WYO 50 (Skyline Drive)
- WYO 51
- WYO 59 (South – Douglas Highway)

== Notable people ==
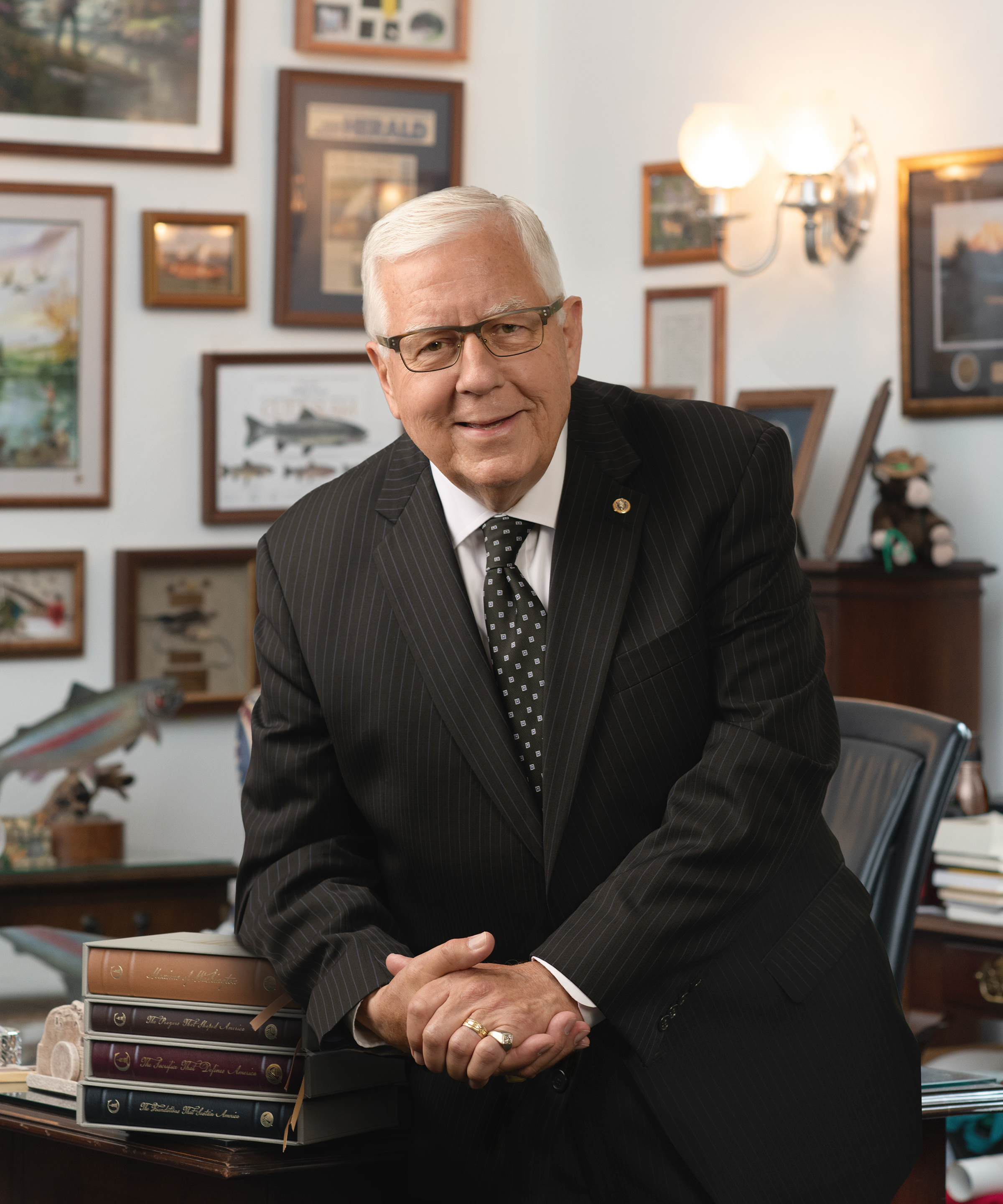
Mike Enzi was mayor of Gillette before serving in the Wyoming State Senate. He was a United States senator from Wyoming.

- Jacob M. Appel (born 1973), author, poet, bioethicist, physician, lawyer, social critic
- Wade Brorby (born 1934), Gillette attorney, 1961–1988, United States federal appellate judge, 1988–
- John Chick (born 1982), professional football player, 2006–2017
- Alicia Craig (born 1982), distance runner
- Mike Enzi (1944–2021), Mayor of Gillette, 1975–1982, Wyoming State Senator, 1993–1997, and United States Senator from Wyoming, 1997–2021
- Joe Clifford Faust (born 1957), author
- Bob Harris (1915–1989), professional baseball player, 1938–42
- Burke Jackson (born 1949), Wyoming rancher, member of the Wyoming House of Representatives, 2004–06
- Mark Klaassen (born 1973), United States Attorney for the District of Wyoming
- Tom Lubnau (born 1958), Gillette attorney, member of the Wyoming House of Representatives, 2005–2015, and Speaker of the Wyoming House of Representatives, 2013–2015
- Weston Ochse (born 1965), author
- Clint Oldenburg (born 1983), professional football player, 2007–2012
- John C. Ostlund (1927–2004), member of the Wyoming Senate
- Sue Wallis (1957–2014), poet, member of the Wyoming House of Representatives, 2007–2014
- Ryun Williams (born 1969), women's basketball head coach, Colorado State
- Sundance Wicks (born 1980), men's basketball head coach, University of Wyoming

== In popular culture ==
In David Breskin's bildungsroman The Real Life Diary of a Boomtown Girl, Randi Bruce Harper is raised by parents in the Wyoming "oil-field service business"; as an adult, she drives a Wabco haul truck "down in the pit" while living with her husband in Gillette. Randi is a member of the first all-female blasting team, the "Boom-Boom Girls".

The Manticore facility is set in Gillette in the cyberpunk TV show Dark Angel and the books based on the show.

Marcus Sakey, in his Brilliance trilogy, lists Gillette as one of the three entrances (along with Rawlins and Shoshoni) to the New Canaan Holdfast, a large portion of Wyoming land owned by "abnorms".

In an interview with HorrorHound magazine, actor and musician Bill Moseley of the band Cornbugs said he was the great-grandson of Edward Gillette and named their studio album Donkey Town in honor of Chicago, Burlington & Quincy Railroad's decision to change the name of Donkey Town to Gillette as a reward for Edward Gillette's surveying work.

On December 5, 1998, Cheryl Trover, a math teacher at Campbell County High School, kidnapped and tied up her children, shot her husband John Trover with a .22-caliber pistol, and stabbed him to death with a hunting knife. She had stolen the gun from her lover of four years, John Riley, the principal at the same school. She then set fire to her pickup truck and lied to police about who committed her crimes. Once police suspected her, she killed herself with a .270 rifle at a friend's house. The events were dramatized in the crime story TV shows Redrum and Murderous Affairs.

The Drive-By Truckers' song "21st Century USA", from their 2020 album The Unraveling, is about a layover the band had in Gillette. It describes the bleak landscape of small US towns, and the hardships of living there.

== Sister cities ==
After the mayor of Gillette visited a coal conference in China, a delegation from Yulin, Shaanxi, came to Gillette. These meetings eventually led the two communities to become sister cities in 2012.
