= Parkman, Wyoming =

- CDP
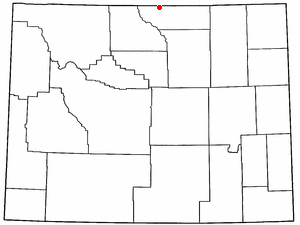
- Location of Parkman, Wyoming
- Coordinates: 44°56′56″N 107°18′28″W
- Country: United States
- State: Wyoming
- County: Sheridan

Area
  - Total: 9.6 sq mi (25 km^{2})
  - Land: 9.6 sq mi (25 km^{2})
  - Water: 0.02 sq mi (0.052 km^{2})
- Elevation: 4,347 ft (1,325 m)

Population (2020)
  - Total: 180
  - Density: 19/sq mi (7.2/km^{2})
- Time zone: UTC-7 (Mountain (MST))
  - Summer (DST): UTC-6 (MDT)
- ZIP code: 82838
- Area code: 307
- FIPS code: 56-59985
- GNIS feature ID: 2409032

Parkman is a census-designated place (CDP) in Sheridan County, Wyoming, United States. The population was 180 at the 2020 census.

== Geography ==
According to the United States Census Bureau, the CDP has a total area of 9.6 square miles (24.9 km^{2}), of which 9.6 square miles (24.8 km^{2}) is land and 0.02 square mile (0.05 km^{2}) (0.20%) is water.

== History ==
The Crow people called the place Awaasúuachiikaxiia, "house that leans," because "the original bar in Parkman had a roof that had one side longer than the other."

== Demographics ==
As of the census of 2000, there were 137 people, 52 households, and 39 families residing in the CDP. The population density was 12.3 people per square mile (4.8/km^{2}). There were 55 housing units at an average density of 4.9/sq mi (1.9/km^{2}). The racial makeup of the CDP was 94.89% White, 1.46% Native American, 2.92% from other races, and 0.73% from two or more races. Hispanic or Latino of any race were 2.92% of the population.

There were 52 households, out of which 34.6% had children under the age of 18 living with them, 61.5% were married couples living together, 11.5% had a female householder with no husband present, and 25.0% were non-families. 21.2% of all households were made up of individuals, and 5.8% had someone living alone who was 65 years of age or older. The average household size was 2.63 and the average family size was 2.90.

In the CDP, the population was spread out, with 24.8% under the age of 18, 7.3% from 18 to 24, 23.4% from 25 to 44, 34.3% from 45 to 64, and 10.2% who were 65 years of age or older. The median age was 42 years. For every 100 females, there were 73.4 males. For every 100 females age 18 and over, there were 77.6 males.

The median income for a household in the CDP was $31,750, and the median income for a family was $39,167. Males had a median income of $23,750 versus $22,917 for females. The per capita income for the CDP was $14,075. There were 4.5% of families and 9.4% of the population living below the poverty line, including 20.7% of under eighteens and none of those over 64.

== Education ==
Public education in the community of Parkman is provided by Sheridan County School District #1. Some students in the area attend class at a tiny one room school house named the Slack School. Others attend school in nearby Ranchester, at either Tongue River Elementary, Middle, or High School.

== Tourism ==
Parkman Daze is a one-day annual summer event featuring a parade, chuckwagon feed, live music, and a poker-style horse race.

== See also ==
- List of municipalities in Wyoming
