= U.S. Route 14 in Wyoming =

Section of U.S. Numbered Highway in Wyoming, United States

U.S. Highway 14
- US 14 highlighted in red and US 14A in blue

Route information
- Maintained by WYDOT
- Length: 400.283 mi (644.193 km)
- Existed: 1936–present

Major junctions
- West end: US 16 / US 20 at Yellowstone National Park
- US 14A in Cody; US 310 in Greybull; US 16 / US 20 in Greybull; US 14A near Dayton; I-90 / US 87 in Ranchester; I-90 / US 87 in Sheridan; US 16 near Clearmont; I-90 in Gillette; I-90 / US 16 in Moorcroft; I-90 in Sundance
- East end: I-90 / US 14 at the South Dakota state line in Beulah

Location
- Country: United States
- State: Wyoming
- Counties: Park, Big Horn, Sheridan, Campbell, Crook

Highway system
- United States Numbered Highway System; List; Special; Divided; Wyoming State Highway System; Interstate; US; State
← WYO 13	→ US 14A

U.S. Highway 14 (US 14) in the U.S. state of Wyoming runs east to west across the northern part of the state. The road connects South Dakota on the east with Yellowstone National Park on the west. It is mostly a two-lane surface road, except for several sections that it shares with Interstate 90 (I-90). The total length is about 400.3 miles (644.2 km).

== Route description ==
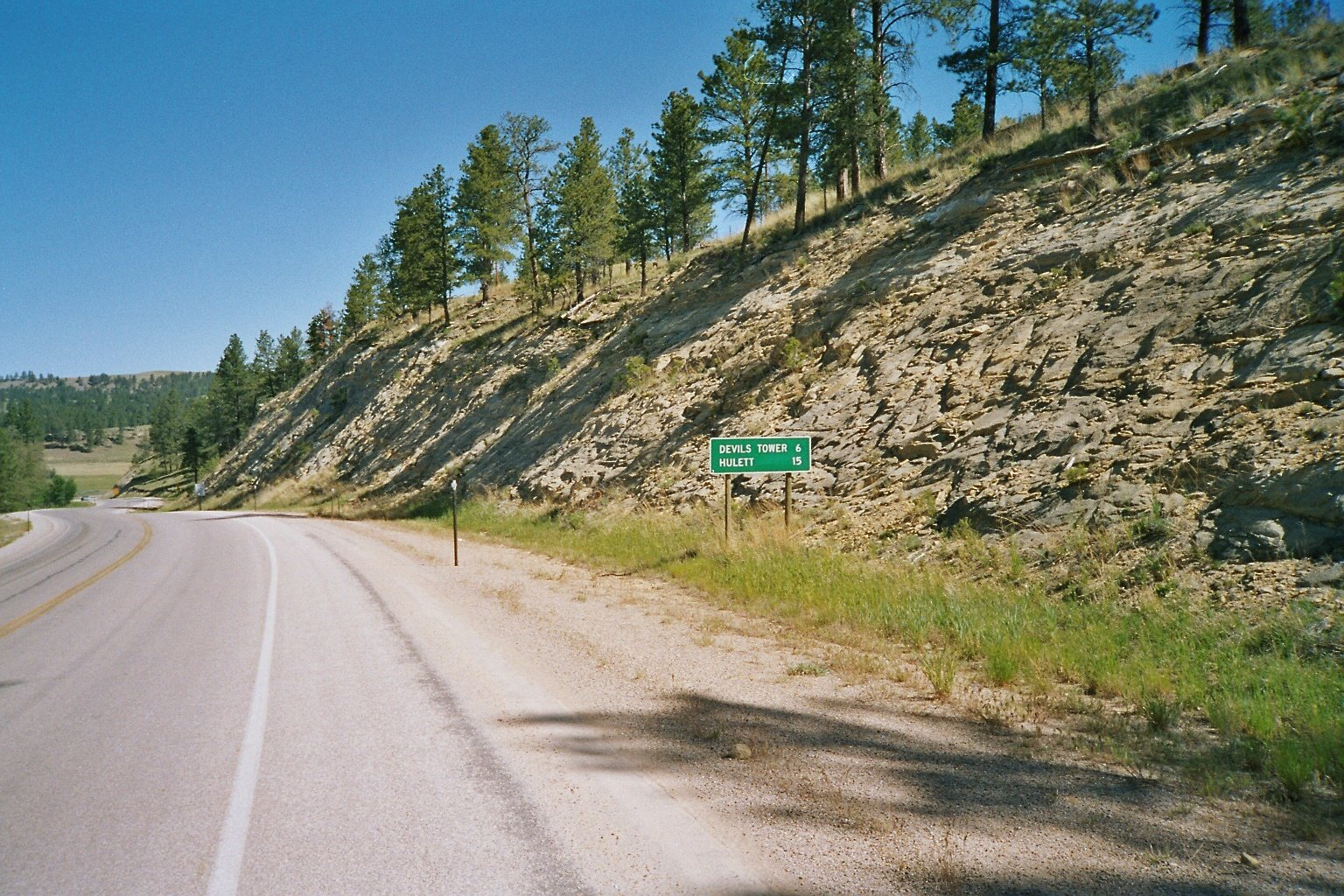
US 14 north toward Devils Tower

While the official western terminus of the road is at the eastern gate of Yellowstone National Park, some commercially produced maps show US 14 within the park itself starting at a junction with US 89 and US 287 at West Thumb and following the northern shore of Yellowstone Lake. From the park, US 14 is cosigned with US 16 and US 20. The roads lead east out of the Absaroka Range and down the Shoshone River valley to Cody. Here, US 14A splits north toward Powell, while US 14/US 16/US 20 continues east across the Bighorn Basin to Greybull. At Greybull, US 16 and US 20 go south, while US 14 travels east to Shell, and the western slope of the Bighorn Mountains. The road ascends a winding path through steep Shell Canyon and rejoins US 14A at the top of the range at Burgess Junction. The road is designated as Bighorn Scenic Byway between Shell and Dayton on the eastern side of the mountain range. On the east side of the Bighorn Mountains, the road merges with I-90 and travels southeast to Sheridan. From Sheridan, the road continues east, rejoining with US 16 near Clearmont. The road travels across the Powder River Country to Gillette where it joins again with I-90 to Moorcroft. From here, it diverges north from I-90 briefly to junction with Wyoming Highway 24 (WYO 24) with access to Devils Tower National Monument. US 14 turns south and rejoins I-90 which it follows to the eastern border of Wyoming and South Dakota.

== History ==
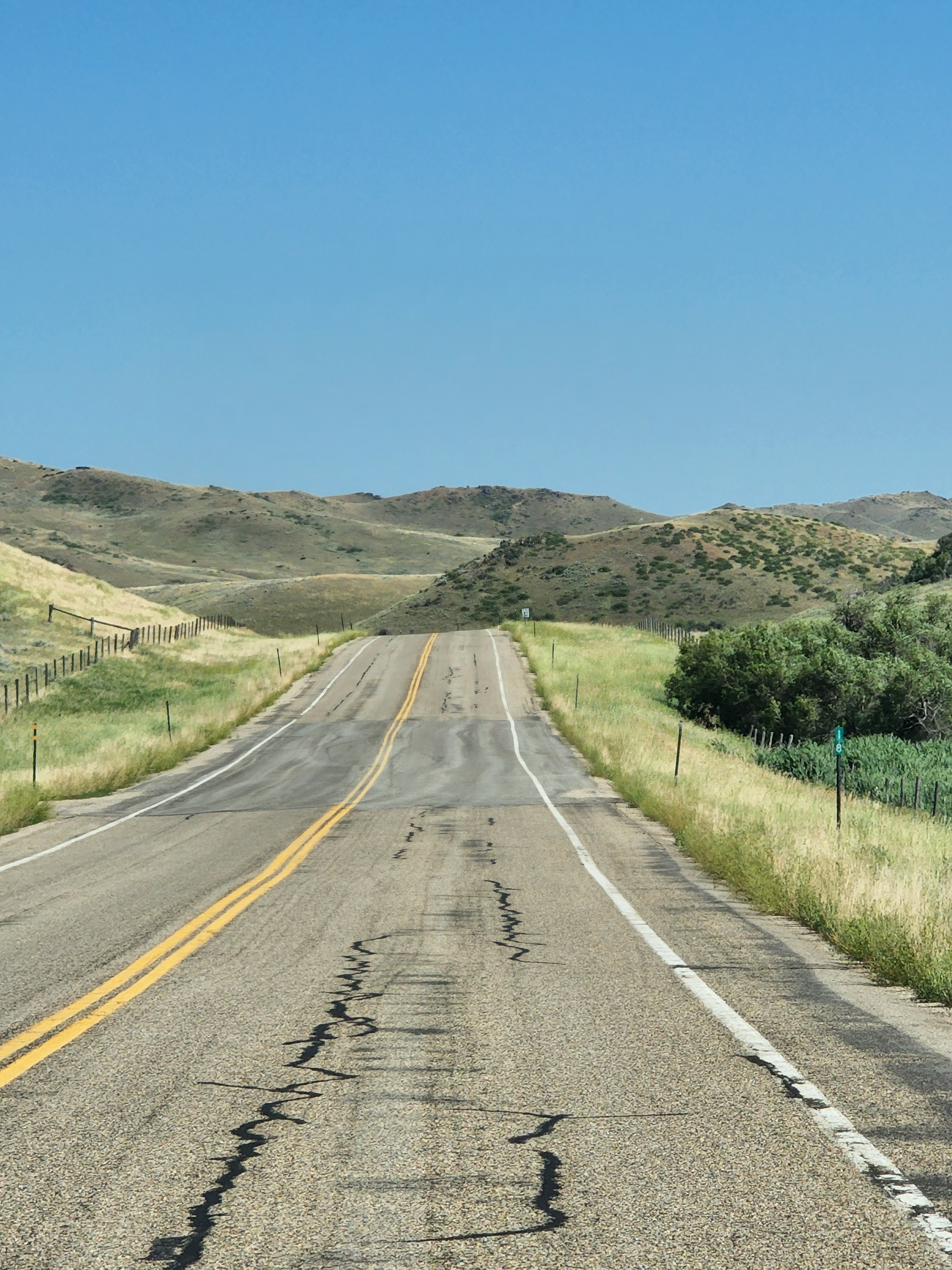
US 14 eastbound in Sheridan County

US 14 was originally planned to stop in Wall, South Dakota. In 1936, the road was extended to the Wyoming border, US 16 was rerouted through Newcastle, and the old US 16 was redesignated as US 14. Prior to 1940, US 14 followed the route currently serviced by US 14A through Lovell and Powell. In 1940, the highway took over WYO 520 between Burgess Junction and Greybull, and the old road was renamed WYO 14. Due to confusion, it was recommissioned as US 14A in 1965. In the 1960s, portions of the highway in the eastern part of the state became I-90.

== Major intersections ==
County	Location	mi	km	Exit	Destinations	Notes
Park	Yellowstone National Park	0.000	0.000		East Entrance Road (to US 20 west)	Continuation into Yellowstone National Park; US 20 resumes in Montana at the park's west entrance (closed winters)
Park	Yellowstone National Park	0.000	0.000	Yellowstone National Park boundary (East Entrance); fees required		
Park	Yellowstone National Park	0.000	0.000		US 16 begins / US 20 begins / Buffalo Bill Cody Scenic Byway begins	US 14 / US 16 western terminus; western end of US 16 / US 20 / Buffalo Bill Cody Scenic Byway concurrency
Park	Pahaska Tepee	2.000	3.219	Westbound road closure gate (closed winters)		
Park	Cody	49.410	79.518		WYO 291 south (South Fork Road)	
Park	Cody	50.900	81.916		US 14A east / WYO 120 west (16th Street) / Buffalo Bill Cody Scenic Byway ends – Powell, Big Horn Natl Rec Area	West end of WYO 120 and Buffalo Bill Cody Scenic Byway concurrency
Park	Cody	54.119	87.096		WYO 120 south – Meeteetse, Thermopolis	East end of WYO 120 concurrency
Big Horn		85.065	136.899		WYO 30 south – Burlington	
Big Horn	Emblem	85.665	137.864		WYO 32 north – Powell, Lovell	
Big Horn		99.197	159.642		US 310 west / WYO 789 north – Lovell, Billings, Bighorn Canyon Natl Recreation Area	West end of WYO 789 concurrency
Big Horn	Greybull	104.176	167.655		US 16 east / US 20 east / WYO 789 south – Basin, Worland	East end of US 16 / US 20 / WYO 789 concurrency
Big Horn–Sheridan county line		141.794	228.195		Granite Pass	
Sheridan	Burgess Junction	151.561	243.914		US 14A west (Medicine Wheel Passage) – Lovell, Yellowstone, Teton	US 14A closed winters
Sheridan	Dayton	175.642	282.668		WYO 343 north	
Sheridan	Ranchester	181.527	292.139		WYO 345 – Parkman	
Sheridan	Ranchester	183.005	294.518	9	I-90 west / US 87 north – Billings	West end of I-90 / US 87 concurrency; exit numbers follow I-90
Sheridan		187.741	302.140	14	WYO 345 west – Acme	
Sheridan		189.464	304.913	16	WYO 339 – Decker, Mont.	
Sheridan	Sheridan	194.043	312.282	20	I-90 BL east / US 14 Bus. east / US 87 Bus. south (Main Street) WYO 338 north (Decker Road)	
Sheridan	Sheridan	196.279	315.880	23	WYO 336 (Fifth Street)	
Sheridan	Sheridan	198.423	319.331	25	I-90 BL west / US 14 Bus. east / US 87 south – Sheridan, Big Horn I-90 east – Buffalo	East end of I-90 / US 87 concurrency
Sheridan	Ucross	225.833	363.443		US 16 west – Buffalo	West end of US 16 concurrency
Sheridan		252.774	406.800		WYO 341 south – Arvada	
Campbell		296.226	476.730		WYO 59 north – Broadus	West end of WYO 59 concurrency
Campbell	Gillette	303.508	488.449		WYO 50 south / I-90 BL west (Skyline Drive) to I-90 – Buffalo, Moorcroft	West end of I-90 BL concurrency
Campbell	Gillette	305.309	491.347		WYO 59 south to I-90 – Douglas	East end of WYO 59 concurrency
Campbell	Gillette	306.631	493.475	128	I-90 west / I-90 BL ends / WYO 51 east – Buffalo	East end of I-90 BL concurrency; west end of I-90 concurrency; exit numbers follow I-90
Campbell	Gillette	308.164	495.942	129	Garner Lake Road	
Campbell		311.445	501.222	132	Wyodak Road	
Campbell		320.384	515.608	141	Rozet	
Crook	Moorcroft	332.559	535.202	153	I-90 east / I-90 BL begins – Sundance	East end of I-90 concurrency; west end of I-90 BL concurrency
Crook	Moorcroft	332.696	535.422		WYO 51 west	
Crook	Moorcroft	333.764	537.141		I-90 BL east / US 16 east to I-90 – Upton, Newcastle	East end of I-90 BL / US 16 concurrency
Crook		338.806	545.255		WYO 113 – Pine Haven	
Crook		359.376	578.360		WYO 24 east – Devils Tower, Hulett	
Crook	Sundance	378.731	609.508		I-90 / I-90 BL begins – Moorcroft, Spearfish	West end of I-90 BL concurrency
Crook	Sundance	378.922	609.816		WYO 116 west – Upton	
Crook	Sundance	380.382	612.165		WYO 585 south – Newcastle	
Crook	Sundance	382.142	614.998	189	I-90 west / I-90 BL ends – Moorcroft	East end of I-90 BL concurrency; west end of I-90 concurrency; exit numbers follow I-90
Crook		385.060	619.694	191	CR 207 (Moskee Road)	
Crook		392.454	631.593	199	WYO 111 – Aladdin	
Crook	Beulah	399.039	642.191	205	Beulah	
Crook		400.283	644.193		I-90 east / US 14 east – Spearfish, Sturgis, Rapid City	Continuation into South Dakota
1.000 mi = 1.609 km; 1.000 km = 0.621 mi: Concurrency terminus; Tolled; Route transition

== Related routes ==
- U.S. Route 14A in Wyoming
- U.S. Route 14 Business (Sheridan, Wyoming)

== See also ==
U.S. Route 14
Previous state: Terminus	Wyoming	Next state: South Dakota
