= Wyoming Highway 112 =

State highway in Wyoming, United States

Wyoming Highway 112
- WYO 112 highlighted in red

Route information
- Maintained by WYDOT
- Length: 29.50 mi (47.48 km)

Major junctions
- South end: WYO 24 in Hulett
- North end: MT 326 at Montana-Wyoming State Line

Location
- Country: United States
- State: Wyoming
- Counties: Crook

Highway system
- Wyoming State Highway System; Interstate; US; State
← WYO 111	→ WYO 113

Wyoming Highway 112 (WYO 112) is a 29.50-mile-long (47.48 km) state highway in north-central Crook County, Wyoming that runs from Hulett to the Montana-Wyoming State Line.

== Route description ==
Wyoming Highway 112 begins its south end at Wyoming Highway 24 in Hulett. From there WYO 112 travels north to Montana-Wyoming State Line. The highway continues north from there a short distance as Montana Secondary Highway 326 to meet US 212 in Alzada, Montana.

== Major intersections ==
The entire route is in Crook County.

Location	mi	km	Destinations	Notes
Hulett	0.00	0.00	WYO 24 – Sundance, Moorcroft, Devils Tower National Monument, Aladdin	
	29.50	47.48	S-326 – Alzada	Continuation beyond Montana state line
1.000 mi = 1.609 km; 1.000 km = 0.621 mi
