= Wyoming Highway 113 =

State highway in Wyoming, United States

Wyoming Highway 113
- Old Sundance Road
- WYO 113 highlighted in red

Route information
- Maintained by WYDOT
- Length: 6.61 mi (10.64 km)

Major junctions
- West end: US 14 north of Moorcroft
- East end: Pine Haven Road in Pine Haven

Location
- Country: United States
- State: Wyoming
- Counties: Crook

Highway system
- Wyoming State Highway System; Interstate; US; State
← WYO 112	→ WYO 114

Wyoming Highway 113 (WYO 113) is a 6.61-mile-long (10.64 km) east-west Wyoming State Road located in southwestern Crook County north of Moorcroft that provides travel to Pine Haven and Keyhole State Park that surrounds the Keyhole reservoir.

== Route description ==
Wyoming Highway 113 travels from U.S. Route 14 5 miles (8.0 km) north of Moorcroft east, then north into Pine Haven near the Keyhole Reservoir. Mileposts along WYO 113 increase from west to east. Milepost 10.00 (0.00) is at US 14 and the highway ends at Milepost 16.61 (6.61)

== Major intersections ==
The entire route is in Crook County.

Location	mi	km	Destinations	Notes
	0.00	0.00	US 14 – Devils Tower Junction, Moorcroft	
Pine Haven	6.61	10.64	Pine Haven Road	Continuation beyond eastern terminus
1.000 mi = 1.609 km; 1.000 km = 0.621 mi
