= Wyoming Highway 24 =

State highway in Wyoming, United States

Wyoming Highway 24
- Bear Lodge Highway
- WYO 24 highlighted in red

Route information
- Maintained by WYDOT
- Length: 46.26 mi (74.45 km)
- Existed: 1961–present

Major junctions
- West end: US 14 at Carlile Junction
- WYO 110 at Devils Tower; WYO 112 in Hulett; WYO 111 in Aladdin
- East end: SD 34 at the South Dakota state line near Aladdin

Location
- Country: United States
- State: Wyoming
- Counties: Crook

Highway system
- Wyoming State Highway System; Interstate; US; State
| ← WYO 22 | → I-25 |
| ← WYO 487 | → WYO 530 |

Wyoming Highway 24 (WYO 24), also known as the Bear Lodge Highway, is a 46.72-mile (75.19 km) state highway in Crook County, Wyoming, United States. that connects U.S. Route 14 (US 14) in Carlile Junction with South Dakota Highway 34 (SD 34) at the South Dakota state line. The route passes through the northern portion of the Bear Lodge Mountains, part of the Black Hills National Forest. The highway also passes by Devils Tower National Monument.

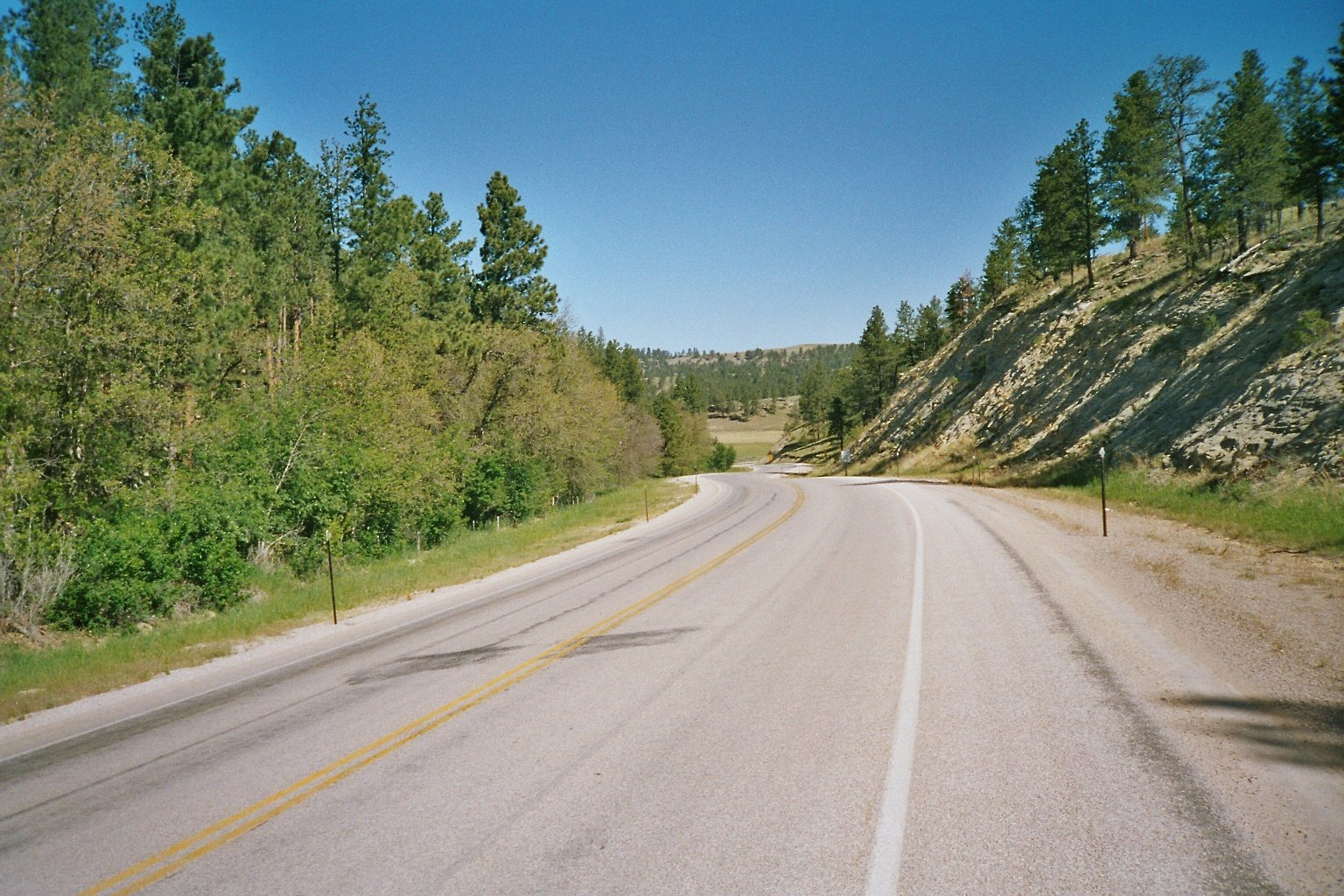
WYO 24 northbound toward Devils Tower, June 2004

== Route description ==
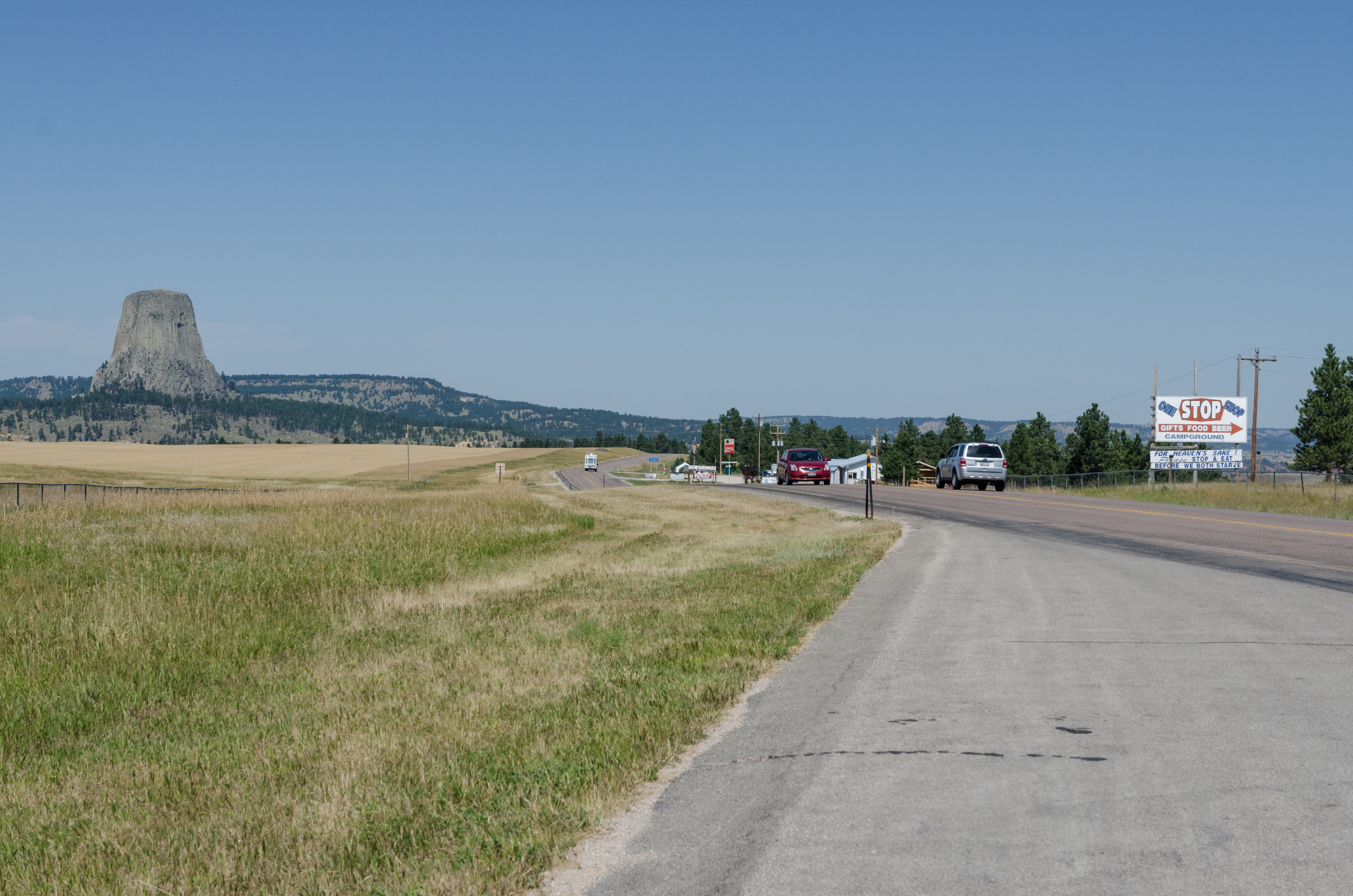
WYO 24 near Devils Tower, August 2011

WYO 24 is begins at US 14 in Carlile Junction (also known as Devils Tower Junction). From its western terminus, it travels in a north–south direction, although the route is signed east–west. It is mainly a two-lane highway from US 14 to near Devils Tower National Monument. When it gets to Devils Tower, it spawns a short spur, Wyoming Highway 110 (WYO 110). After passing by WYO 110, it curves northeast-southwest. The road reaches Hulett, where it intersects Wyoming Highway 112. In Hulett, WYO 24 is dubbed Main Street and A Street. Moving on, WYO 24 curves to the signed east–west orientation, but curves northwest-southeast. WYO 24 passes by some gulches, most notably Reservoir Gulch and Lucky Gulch. WYO 24 then turns south, then generally follows the east–west orientation. It then intersects Wyoming Highway 111 a short time later. There are no further major junctions and towns on the route, as WYO 24 crosses the state line and becomes SD 34.

== History ==
WYO 24 was not in the original State Highway grid until 1961. The predecessor to this route was Wyoming Highway 514.

In 2018, the speed limit on WYO 24 near Devils Tower was reduced from 65 miles per hour (105 km/h) to 45 mph (72 km/h) due to higher traffic volumes during peak travel seasons and the road's history of collisions. The monument had its highest visitor count in 2021, which saw traffic jams from the entrance that slowed a section of WYO 24.

== Major intersections ==
The entire route is in Crook County.

| Location | mi | km | Destinations | Notes |
|---|---|---|---|---|
| Carlile Junction | 0.00 | 0.00 | US 14 north – Sundance, Spearfish (South Dakota) US 14 south – Moorcroft, Gillette | Western terminus; T intersection |
| Devils Tower | 5.98 | 9.62 | WYO 110 west (Devils Tower Monument Road) – Devils Tower | Eastern terminus of WYO 110; T intersection |
| Hulett | 14.79 | 23.80 | Bridge over Belle Fourche River | |
| Hulett | 15.13 | 24.35 | WYO 112 north (Hulett–Alzada Highway) – Alzada (Montana) | Southern terminus of WYO 112; T intersection |
| Hulett | 15.35 | 24.70 | Bridge over Belle Fourche River | |
| Aladdin | 39.26 | 63.18 | WYO 111 south – I-90/US 14 | Northern terminus of WYO 111; T intersection |
| | 46.26 | 74.45 | South Dakota State Line | Eastern terminus |
| | 46.26 | 74.45 | SD 34 east – Belle Fourche, Sturgis, Pierre | Continuation east beyond eastern terminus |
1.000 mi = 1.609 km; 1.000 km = 0.621 mi

== See also ==
- List of state highways in Wyoming
