= Alva, Wyoming =

Unincorporated community in Crook County, Wyoming, United States

Alva is an unincorporated community in north central Crook County, Wyoming, United States

== Description ==
The community lies along Wyoming Highway 24, 34.9 miles (56.2 km) north of the town of Sundance, the county seat of Crook County and 9.7 miles away from Hulett. Its elevation is 3,993 feet (1,217 m), and it is located at 44°41′41″N 104°26′29″W (44.694707, -104.441342). Although Alva is unincorporated, it has a post office, with the ZIP code of 82711. Population is 50.

Public education in the community of Alva is provided by Crook County School District #1.

== Climate ==
According to the Köppen Climate Classification system, Alva has a semi-arid climate, abbreviated "BSk" on climate maps.
