= Wyoming Highway 585 =

State highway in Weston and Crook counties in Wyoming, United States

Wyoming Highway 585
- WYO 585 highlighted in red

Route information
- Maintained by WYDOT
- Length: 28.000 mi (45.062 km)
- Existed: 1933–present

Major junctions
- South end: US 85 in Four Corners
- I-90 in Sundance
- North end: I-90 BL / US 14 in Sundance

Location
- Country: United States
- State: Wyoming
- Counties: Weston, Crook

Highway system
- Wyoming State Highway System; Interstate; US; State
← WYO 530	→ WYO 789

Wyoming Highway 585 (WYO 585) is a 28-mile (45 km) north-south state highway in Weston and Crook counties in northeastern Wyoming, United States, that connects U.S. Route 85 (US 85) in Four Corners with Intersate 90 Business / U.S. Route 14 (I-90 BL / US 14) in Sundance.

== Route description ==
=== Weston County ===
WYO 585 begins at a T intersection with US 85 (CanAm Highway) in the unincorporated community of Four Corners on the Canyon Springs Prairie in the northeast corner of Weston County. (US 85 heads north towards the Wyoming-South Dakota state line and then on towards Lead in South Dakota. US 85 heads south towards Newcastle and Mule Creek Junction.) From its southern terminus, WYO 585 proceeds north-northwesterly as a two lane road (until it enters Sundance) for just over 9.6 miles (15.4 km) to pass through what little remains of the unincorporated community of Horton before crossing the Weston-Crook county line and entering Crook County.

=== Crook County ===
Shortly after entering Crook County, WYO 585 crosses the Inyan Kara Creek and then Soldier Creek as it continues proceeding north-northwesterly. WYO 585 connects with the east end of County Road 49 (CR 49 / Steve Banks Road), roughly ten miles (16 km) north of the county line. (CR 49 heads due west to end at Wyoming Highway 116. From the same intersection Ferderer Road, a private road, heads briefly east.)

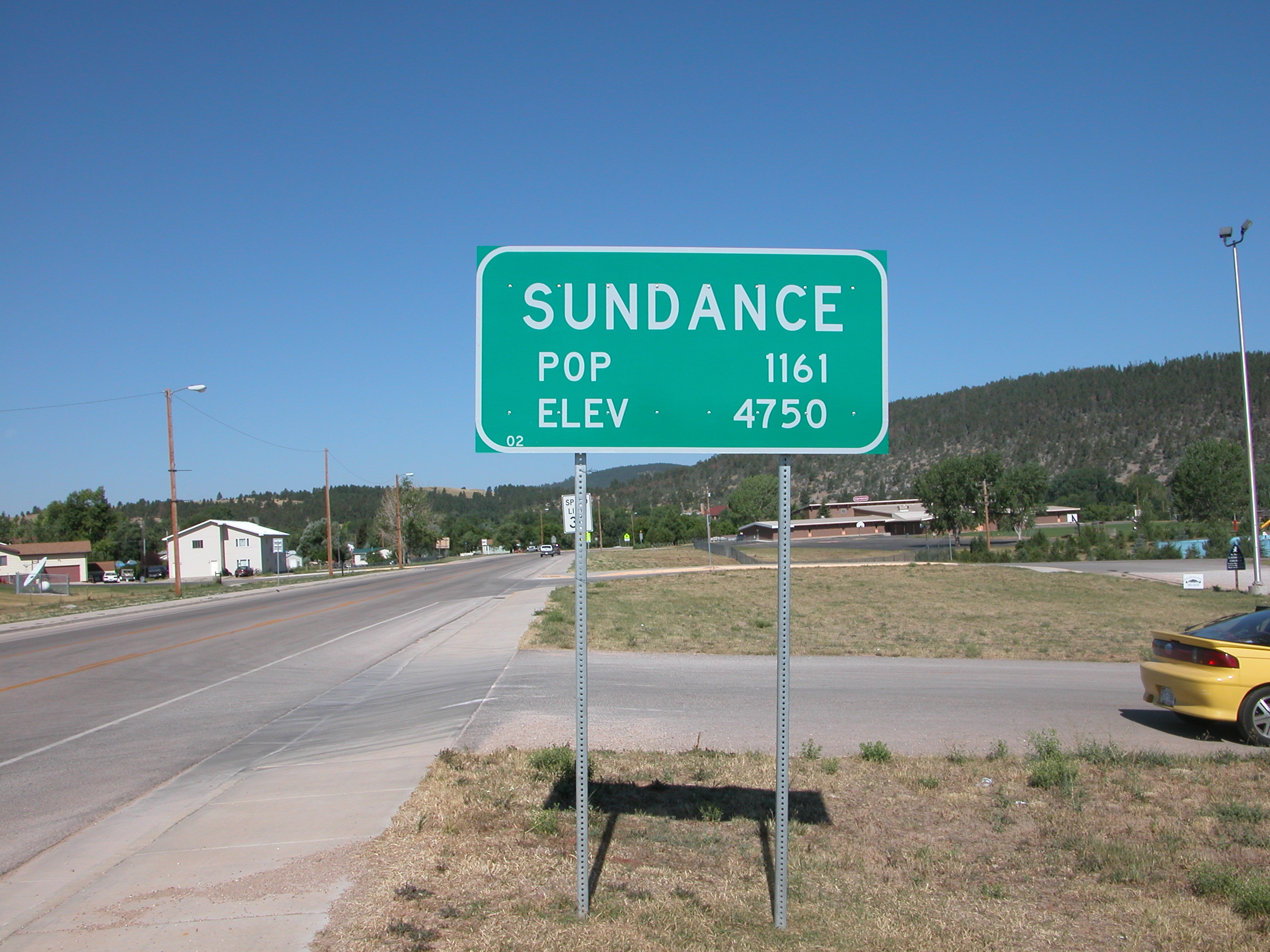
Sundance city limits sign on northbound WYO 585, August 2003

About 8.3 miles (13.4 km) farther, and after crossing Silver Creek and entering the city of Sundance, WYO 585 reaches Interstate 90 (I-90), exit 187, at a diamond interchange. (I-90 heads east to run concurrently with US 14 and on towards Beulah and then Spearfish and Rapid City in South Dakota. I-90 heads west towards Moorcroft and Gillette.) Approximately one-half mile (0.80 km) northwest of I-90, WYO 585 reaches its northern terminus at an intersection with I-90 BL / US 14 (East Cleveland Street), after crossing Sundance Creek. (I-90 BL. / US 14 heads east towards Beulah, Spearfish, and Rapid City. Dakota. I-90 heads west towards Devils Tower Junction [also known as Carlile Junction], Devils Tower, and Hulett. North 6th Street continues north from the intersection for several blocks before ending on the north side of town.)

== History ==
WYO 585 was commissioned in 1933 and has kept its original alignment since then. In 1933, US 85 had four US auxiliary routes: US 185, US 285, US 385, and US 485. It was possible that planners wanted WYO 585 to be made into US 585; however, that never happened.

== Major intersections ==
County	Location	mi	km	Destinations	Notes
Weston	Four Corners	0.000	0.000	US 85 north (CanAm Hwy) – South Dakota state line, Lead (South Dakota) US 85 north (CanAm Hwy) – Newcastle, Mule Creek Junction	Southern terminus; T intersection
Crook		11.220	18.057	Bridge over Inyan Kara Creek	
Crook		13.260	21.340	Bridge over Soldier Creek	
Crook		19.130	30.787	Ferderer Rd east CR 49 west (Steve Banks Rd) – WYO 116	Ferderer Rd is a private road
Crook		22.026	35.447	Bridge over Silver Creek	
Crook	Sundance	27.431	44.146	I-90 east – Beulah, Spearfish (South Dakota), Rapid City (South Dakota) I-90 west – Moorcroft, Gillette	Diamond interchange I-90 exit 187
Crook	Sundance	27.890	44.885	Bridge over Sundance Creek	
Crook	Sundance	28.000	45.062	I-90 BL east / US 14 east – Beulah, Spearfish (South Dakota), Rapid City (South Dakota) I-90 BL west / US 14 west – Devils Tower Junction, Devils Tower, Hulett	Northern terminus
Crook	Sundance	28.000	45.062	North 6th St north	Continuation north from northern terminus
1.000 mi = 1.609 km; 1.000 km = 0.621 mi

== See also ==
- List of state highways in Wyoming
