= Beulah, Wyoming =

Census-designated place in Wyoming, United States

- CDP
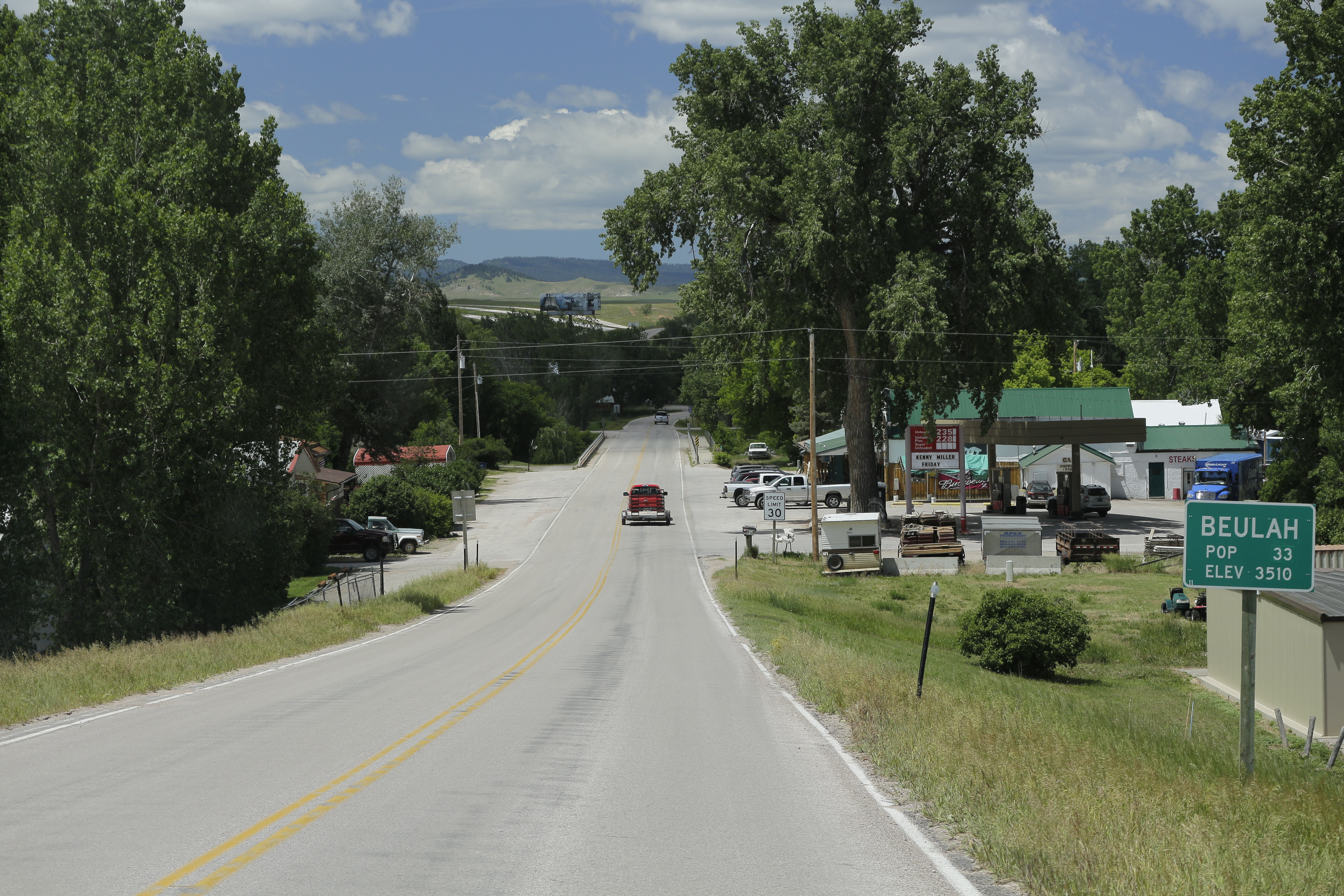
- Beulah, Wyoming seen from Old Highway 14

- Location in Crook County and the state of Wyoming
- Coordinates: 44°32′45″N 104°04′58″W
- Country: United States
- State: Wyoming
- County: Crook

Area
  - Total: 0.55 sq mi (1.4 km^{2})
  - Land: 0.55 sq mi (1.4 km^{2})
  - Water: 0.0 sq mi (0 km^{2})
- Elevation: 3,521 ft (1,073 m)

Population (2020)
  - Total: 84
  - Density: 150/sq mi (59/km^{2})
- Time zone: UTC-7 (Mountain (MST))
  - Summer (DST): UTC-6 (MDT)
- Area code: 307
- FIPS code: 56-06480
- GNIS feature ID: 2585079

Beulah is a census-designated place (CDP) in eastern Crook County, Wyoming, United States, along Sand Creek, a tributary of the Belle Fourche River. According to local residents, the population is 33. When the 2010 census reported the population as 73, the highway sign at the town entrance was changed. In 2012, Beulah residents succeeded in appealing to the Wyoming Governor to remove the new sign and replace it with one that proclaimed the population to be 33.

== Geography ==
Beulah is located alongside Interstate 90 which runs concurrently with U.S. Route 14. The town is northeast of Sundance, the county seat of Crook County. Although Beulah is unincorporated, it is served by the United States Postal Service and has a post office, with the ZIP code of 82712.

According to the United States Census Bureau, the CDP has a total area of 0.55 square mile (1.4 km^{2}), all land.

Beulah is located approximately 15 miles west of Spearfish, South Dakota by I-90, and a further 62 miles east from Rapid City. To the west, Beulah is located 47 miles of Keyhole State Park and approximately 50 miles from Devils Tower National Monument. The nearest general aviation airport is Black Hills Airport in Spearfish, and the nearest airport with commercial service is Rapid City Regional Airport.

=== Climate ===
According to the Köppen Climate Classification system, Beulah has a semi-arid climate, abbreviated "BSk" on climate maps.

The climate table below includes data from Bear Ridge, South Dakota, a weather station 4.2 miles (6.8 km) southeast of Beulah.

Climate data for Bear Ridge, South Dakota, 1991–2020 normals: 3900ft (1189m)
Month	Jan	Feb	Mar	Apr	May	Jun	Jul	Aug	Sep	Oct	Nov	Dec	Year
Record high °F (°C)	74 (23)	73 (23)	82 (28)	94 (34)	97 (36)	112 (44)	113 (45)	109 (43)	104 (40)	95 (35)	79 (26)	71 (22)	113 (45)
Mean maximum °F (°C)	60.4 (15.8)	61.4 (16.3)	72.3 (22.4)	81.5 (27.5)	88.6 (31.4)	99.5 (37.5)	103.9 (39.9)	102.6 (39.2)	97.7 (36.5)	83.9 (28.8)	71.0 (21.7)	60.3 (15.7)	105.7 (40.9)
Mean daily maximum °F (°C)	39.0 (3.9)	39.9 (4.4)	49.3 (9.6)	57.7 (14.3)	67.3 (19.6)	79.0 (26.1)	87.5 (30.8)	86.9 (30.5)	75.9 (24.4)	60.5 (15.8)	47.4 (8.6)	39.3 (4.1)	60.8 (16.0)
Daily mean °F (°C)	26.6 (−3.0)	27.1 (−2.7)	35.6 (2.0)	43.7 (6.5)	53.6 (12.0)	63.9 (17.7)	71.2 (21.8)	70.1 (21.2)	60.0 (15.6)	46.6 (8.1)	35.2 (1.8)	27.2 (−2.7)	46.7 (8.2)
Mean daily minimum °F (°C)	14.2 (−9.9)	14.4 (−9.8)	21.9 (−5.6)	29.7 (−1.3)	39.8 (4.3)	48.8 (9.3)	54.9 (12.7)	53.2 (11.8)	44.1 (6.7)	32.7 (0.4)	22.9 (−5.1)	15.1 (−9.4)	32.6 (0.3)
Mean minimum °F (°C)	−5.4 (−20.8)	−5.6 (−20.9)	4.3 (−15.4)	16.0 (−8.9)	29.1 (−1.6)	40.1 (4.5)	47.7 (8.7)	44.8 (7.1)	34.3 (1.3)	19.0 (−7.2)	5.6 (−14.7)	−4.9 (−20.5)	−14.1 (−25.6)
Record low °F (°C)	−16 (−27)	−24 (−31)	−20 (−29)	−1 (−18)	22 (−6)	31 (−1)	34 (1)	32 (0)	26 (−3)	−8 (−22)	−9 (−23)	−22 (−30)	−24 (−31)
Average precipitation inches (mm)	0.92 (23)	1.17 (30)	1.40 (36)	2.75 (70)	3.89 (99)	3.79 (96)	2.32 (59)	2.04 (52)	1.57 (40)	2.28 (58)	1.14 (29)	0.90 (23)	24.17 (615)
Average snowfall inches (cm)	13.90 (35.3)	18.10 (46.0)	18.40 (46.7)	17.20 (43.7)	4.60 (11.7)	0.00 (0.00)	0.00 (0.00)	0.00 (0.00)	0.60 (1.5)	10.80 (27.4)	13.70 (34.8)	16.90 (42.9)	114.2 (290)
Source 1: NOAA
Source 2: XMACIS (records & monthly max/mins)

== Education ==
Public education in the community of Beulah is provided by Crook County School District #1.
