= Missouri Buttes =

Mountains in Wyoming, United States

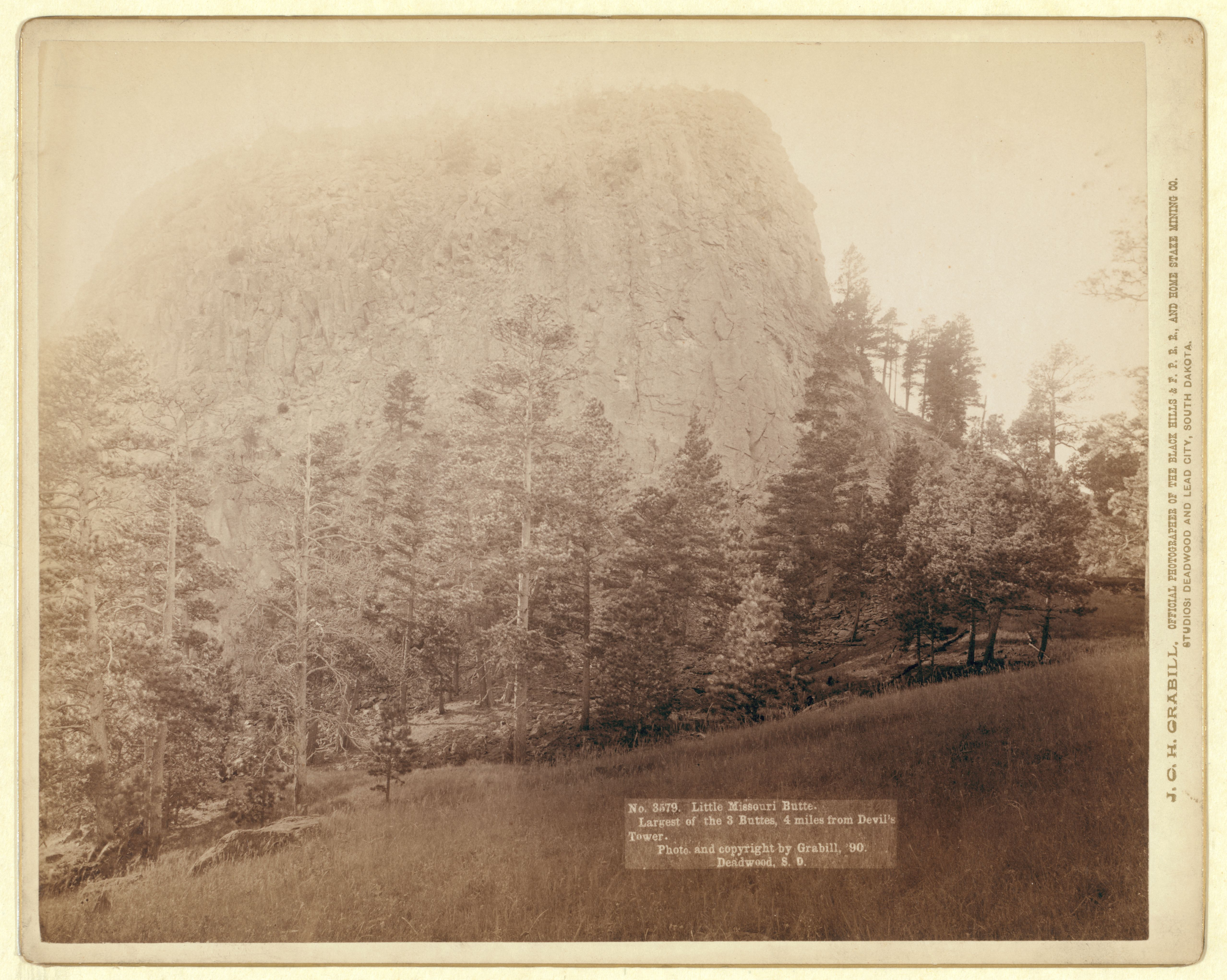
- Little Missouri Butte, the tallest of the buttes, in 1890

Highest point
- Elevation: 5,374 ft (1,638 m)
- Prominence: 1,204 ft (367 m)
- Coordinates: 44°36′57″N 104°46′29″W

Geography
- Location within Wyoming
- Location: Crook County, Wyoming, U.S.
- Parent range: Black Hills
- Topo map(s): USGS Missouri Buttes, WY

Missouri Buttes or Little Missouri Buttes are located in Crook County in northeast Wyoming on the northwest flank of the Black Hills Uplift. The buttes are 3.5 miles (5.6 km) northwest (N60°W) of Devils Tower between the Little Missouri and the Belle Fourche rivers.

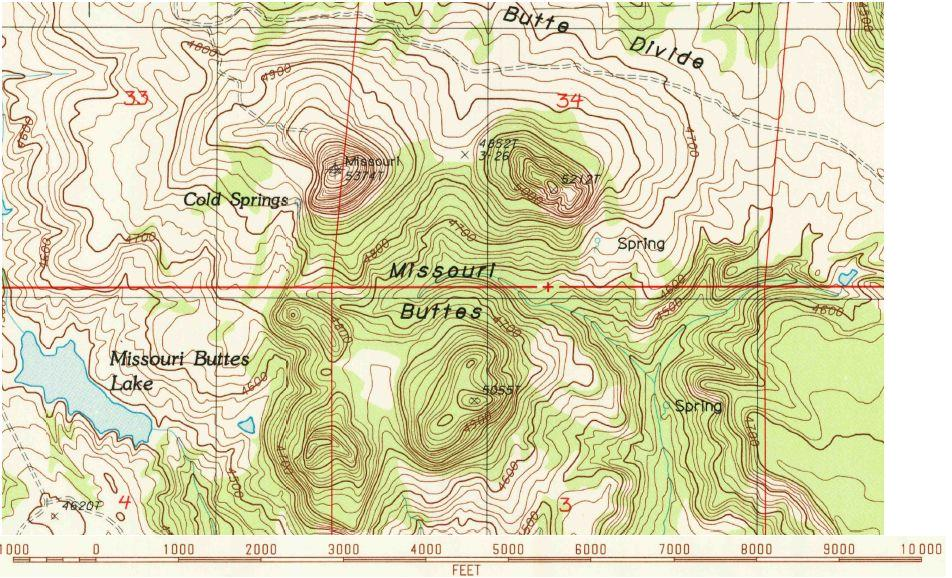
Topographic map of the Missouri Buttes area

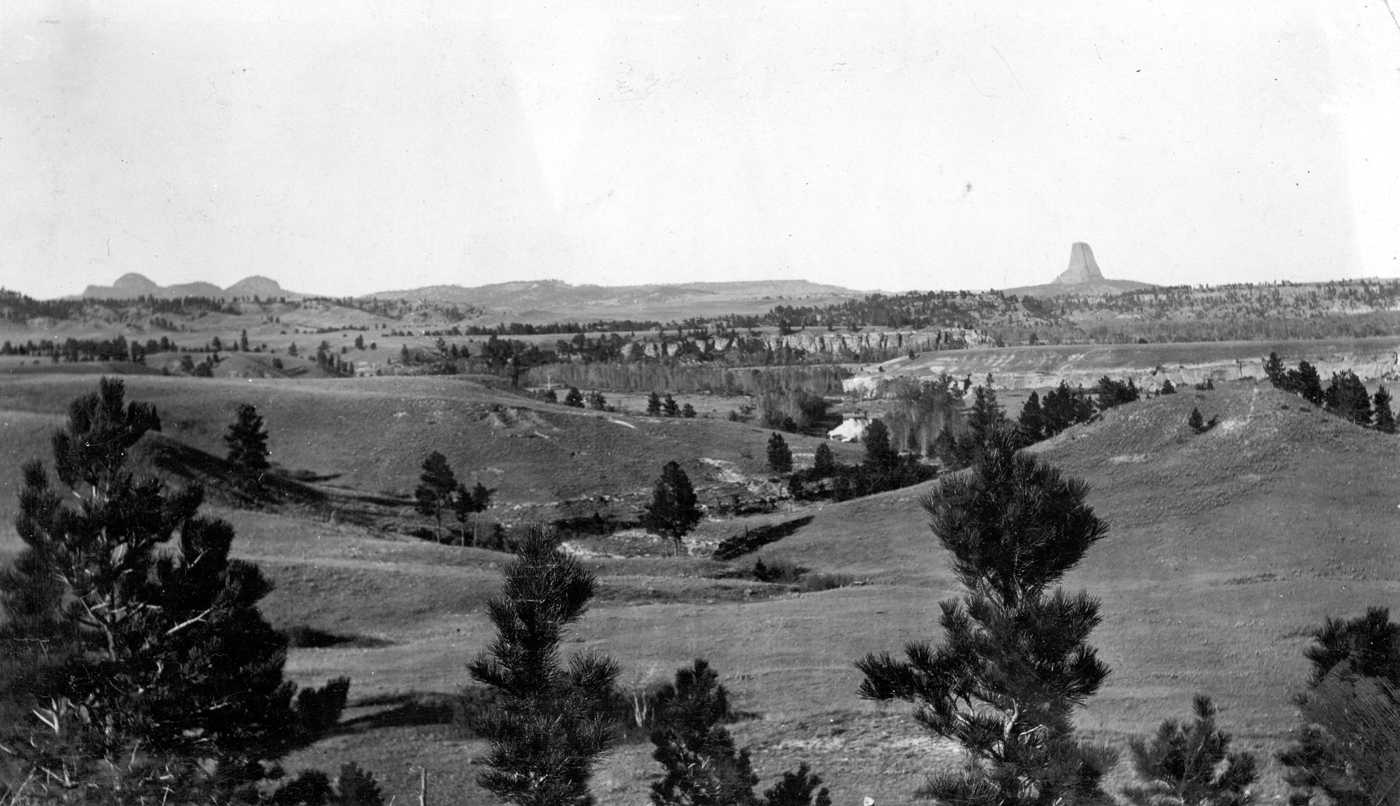
Devils Tower (right) and Missouri Buttes (left) on the horizon, viewed from the divide of Cabin Creek, 12 miles south. 1908 USGS photograph

The Missouri Buttes consist of four separate summits which arise from an eroded mesa platform, the Butte Divide, which has an elevation of 4,650 feet (1,420 m). The butte peaks form a rough rectangle 0.5 x 0.65 mi. in size. The northwest butte is the highest with a summit at 5,374 feet (1,638 m). The northeast butte has an elevation of 5,212 feet (1,589 m), the southwest butte has an elevation of 5,020 feet (1,530 m), and the southeast butte has an elevation of 5,055 feet (1,541 m). A small lake, the Missouri Buttes Lake, lies 800 metres (2,600 ft) west of the buttes.

== Geology ==
As with Devils Tower, the buttes are composed of igneous intrusive phonolite which exhibits columnar jointing. The rocks of the buttes have been interpreted to be part of a laccolith, a magmatic stock or volcano conduits that became exposed at the surface after overlying rocks were eroded..

The primary rock type at the Missouri Buttes is phonolite. This specific volcanic rock is characterized by a fine-grained gray or greenish-gray matrix containing large crystals, or phenocrysts, of feldspar and nepheline. Geologists classify the Missouri Buttes as a series of laccoliths or volcanic plugs. Because the four peaks are so closely grouped, it is believed they originated from a single large intrusive body that was later segmented by erosion. Unlike many volcanic features, the Missouri Buttes were never active volcanoes that erupted ash or lava onto the surface; instead, they cooled entirely underground as shallow intrusions.

The Missouri Buttes are located on private land with no public access.
