= Wyoming Highway 111 =

State highway in Wyoming, United States

Wyoming Highway 111
- WYO 111 highlighted in red

Route information
- Maintained by WYDOT
- Length: 8.63 mi (13.89 km)

Major junctions
- South end: I-90 / US 14
- North end: WYO 24 in Aladdin

Location
- Country: United States
- State: Wyoming
- Counties: Crook

Highway system
- Wyoming State Highway System; Interstate; US; State
← WYO 110	→ WYO 112

Wyoming Highway 111 (WYO 111) is an 8.63-mile-long (13.89 km) state highway in Wyoming located in eastern Crook County.

== Route description ==
Wyoming Highway 111 begins its south end at I-90/US 14 (Exit 199). From there the highway travels north to Wyoming Highway 24 in Aladdin. Highway 111 is 8.63 miles (13.89 km) long and provides a connection between I-90 and WYO 24.

== Major intersections ==
The entire route is in Crook County.

Location	mi	km	Destinations	Notes
	0.0	0.0	I-90 / US 14 – Sundance, Spearfish	Southern Terminus of WYO 111; Exit 199 (I-90/US 14)
Aladdin	8.63	13.89	WYO 24	Northern Terminus of WYO 111
1.000 mi = 1.609 km; 1.000 km = 0.621 mi
