= Keyhole State Park =

State park in Wyoming, United States

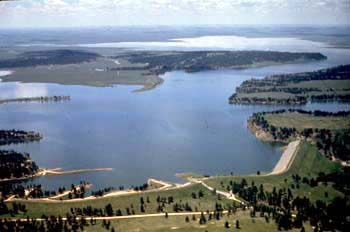

- Location within Wyoming
- Location: Crook County, Wyoming, United States
- Coordinates: 44°21′24″N 104°50′29″W
- Area: 15,890 acres (6,430 ha)
- Elevation: 4,088 ft (1,246 m)
- Established: 1952
- Administrator: Wyoming State Parks, Historic Sites & Trails
- Designation: Wyoming state park
- Website: Official website

Keyhole State Park is a public recreation area surrounding Keyhole Reservoir, ten miles (16 km) northeast of Moorcroft in Crook County, Wyoming. The state park is managed by the Wyoming Division of State Parks and Historic Sites.

== History ==
Keyhole Reservoir, an impoundment of the Belle Fourche River, was formed by the Keyhole Dam project of the United States Bureau of Reclamation, completed in 1952. The reservoir has a total capacity of 334,200 acre-feet (412,200,000 m^{3}) and water surface of 13,700 acres (5,500 ha), which provides storage for irrigation, flood control, fish and wildlife conservation, recreation, sediment control, and municipal and industrial water supply. Although located in Wyoming, the reservoir's waters are allocated by compact to go 90 percent to South Dakota and 10 percent to Wyoming.

== Activities and amenities ==
The state park features multiple campgrounds, a concessionaire-operated marina, fishing and other water recreation. The park also features 5 hiking trails.
