= Crook County School District Number 1 =

School district in Wyoming, United States

Crook County School District #1 is a public school district based in Sundance, Wyoming, United States.

== Geography ==
Crook County School District #1 serves all of Crook County, including the following communities:

- Incorporated places
  - Town of Hulett
  - Town of Moorcroft
  - Town of Pine Haven
  - Town of Sundance
- Unincorporated places
  - Aladdin
  - Alva
  - Beulah

== Schools ==
- Grades 8-12
  - Bear Lodge High School (Alternative)
- Grades 7-12
  - Moorcroft Secondary School
  - Sundance Secondary School
- Grades K-6
  - Moorcroft Elementary School
  - Sundance Elementary School
- Grades K-12
  - Hulett School

== Student demographics ==
The following figures are as of October 1, 2019.

- Total District Enrollment: 1,201
- Student enrollment by gender
  - Male: 612 (50.96%)
  - Female: 589 (49.04%)
- Student enrollment by ethnicity
  - American Indian or Alaska Native: 16 (1.33%)
  - Asian: 2 (0.17%)
  - Black or African American: 9 (0.75%)
  - Hispanic or Latino: 25 (2.08%)
  - Two or More Races: 22 (1.83%)
  - White: 1,127 (93.84%)

== See also ==
- List of school districts in Wyoming
