= Aladdin, Wyoming =

Aladdin
- Hamlet
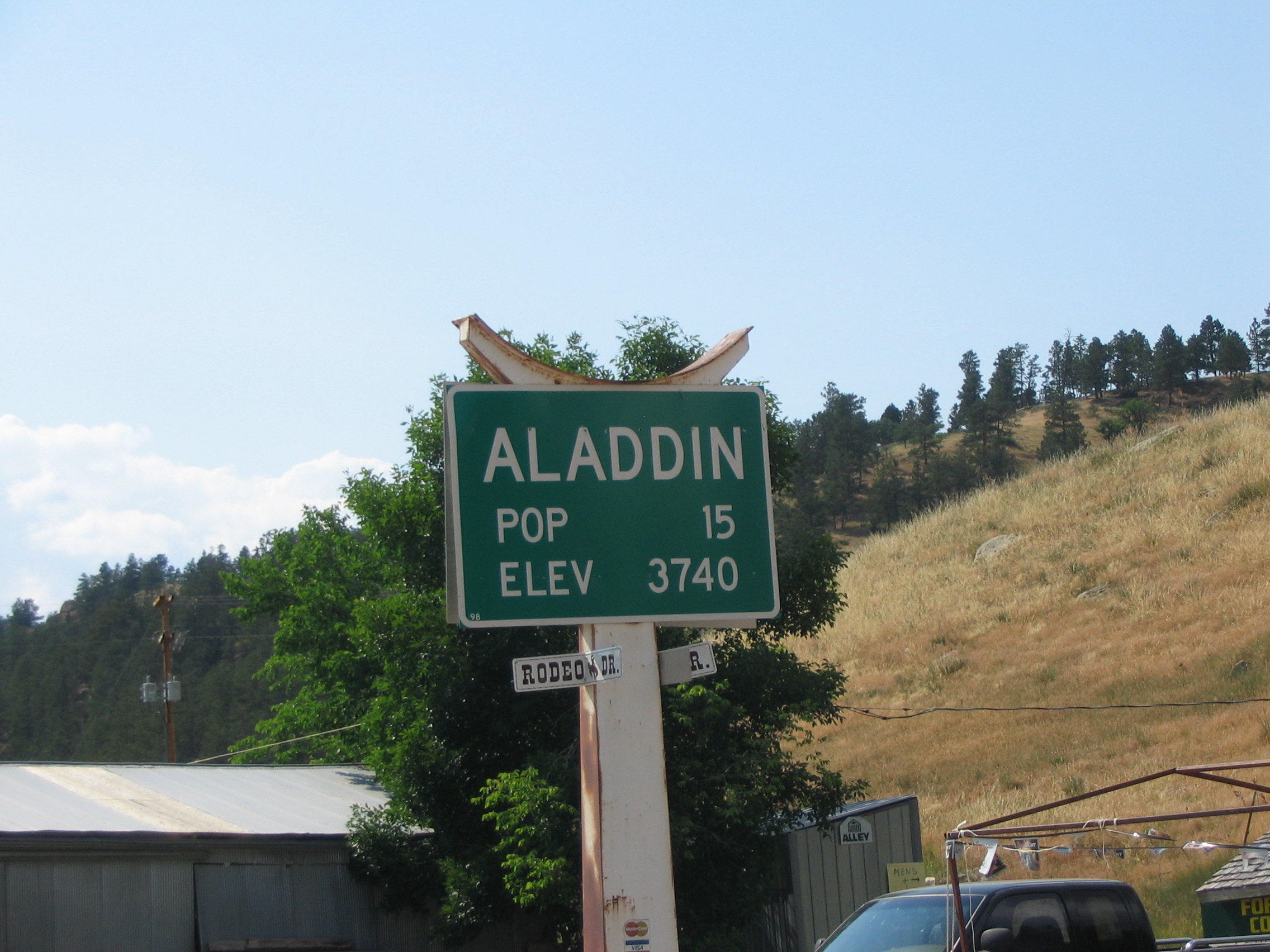
- Aladdin, Wyoming population sign

- Location within the state of Wyoming Aladdin (the United States)
- Coordinates: 44°38′24″N 104°11′01″W
- Country: United States
- State: Wyoming
- County: Crook
- Elevation: 3,688 ft (1,124 m)

Population (2009)
  - Total: 15
- Time zone: UTC-7 (Mountain (MST))
  - Summer (DST): UTC-6 (MDT)
- ZIP code: 82710
- GNIS feature ID: 1597196

Aladdin is a 30-acre hamlet in eastern Crook County, Wyoming, United States, lying at the junction of Wyoming routes 24 and 111, 20 miles northeast of Sundance, the county seat. Although Aladdin is unincorporated, it has a post office, with the ZIP code of 82710; the post office is located in the town's general store, which was established in 1896, serving as a commissary for coal miners working at the Aladdin Coal Tipple, about a mile up the street, where coal was mined until 1942.

In July 2014, the Brangle family, which owned the town, announced that it was for sale. Included in the $1.5 million price was the old two-story general store, a bar, the family's four-bedroom home, and town's trailer park (excluding the trailers). After the town failed to sell at the asking price, Rick Brangle decided to sell the town at auction. An auction was held on June 2, 2017, but the deal fell through. In June 2019, the town was sold to Trent Tope, a local rancher and Aladdin native, who has since added additional bathrooms and a 26 ft bar.

Public education for the tiny Aladdin community is provided by Crook County School District #1. According to local lore and the sign prominently displayed in front of the General Store, there are 15 people living in Aladdin. This is down from its coal mining peak of 200 people.

According to the Köppen Climate Classification system, Aladdin has a semi-arid climate.
