= Crook County, Wyoming =

County in Wyoming, United States

- County
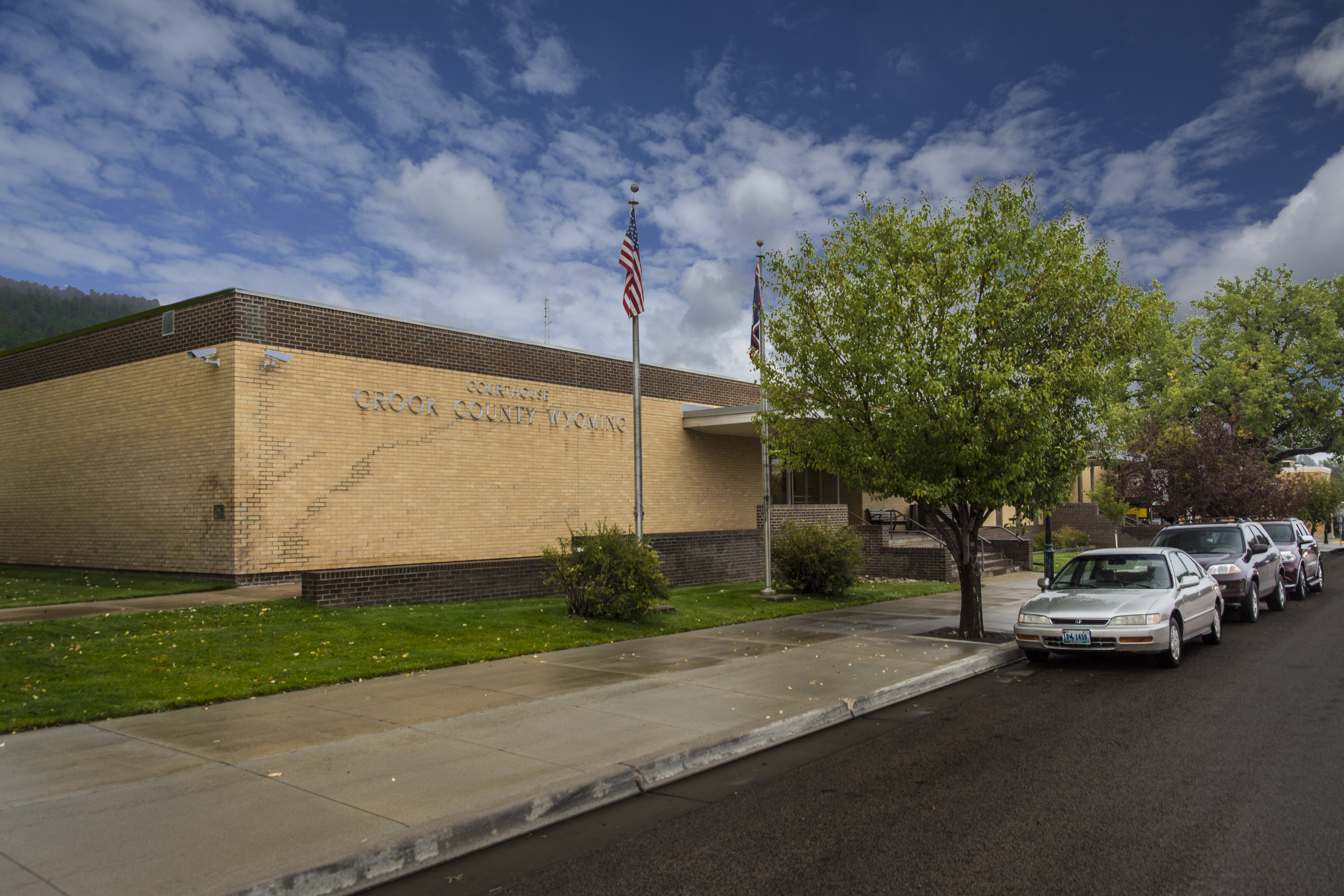
- Crook County Courthouse

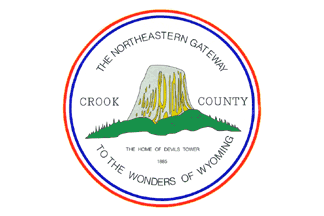
- Flag

- Location within the U.S. state of Wyoming
- Coordinates: 44°35′N 104°34′W
- Country: United States
- State: Wyoming
- Founded: December 8, 1875 (authorized); 1888 (organized)
- Named for: George Crook
- Seat: Sundance
- Largest town: Sundance

Area
  - Total: 2,865 sq mi (7,420 km^{2})
  - Land: 2,854 sq mi (7,390 km^{2})
  - Water: 11 sq mi (28 km^{2}) 0.4%

Population (2020)
  - Total: 7,181
  - Estimate (2025): 7,852 ▲
  - Density: 2.516/sq mi (0.9715/km^{2})
- Time zone: UTC−7 (Mountain)
  - Summer (DST): UTC−6 (MDT)
- Congressional district: At-large
- Website: www.crookcounty.wy.gov

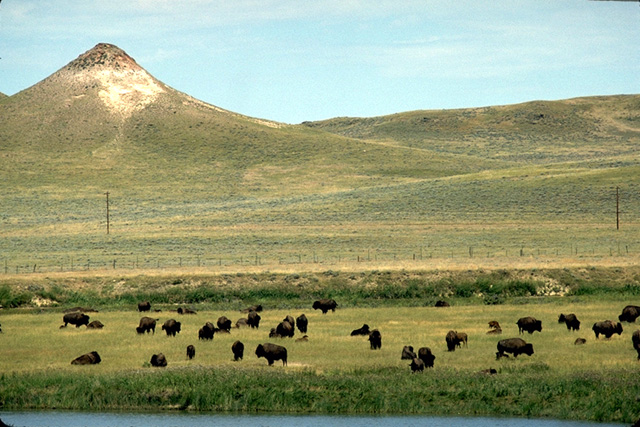
Buffalo on the range in Crook County

Crook County is a county in the northeastern corner of the U.S. state of Wyoming. As of the 2020 United States census, the population was 7,181, making it the third-least populous county in Wyoming. Its county seat and largest city is Sundance. The county is located at the northwestern extreme of the Black Hills, which are its defining geographical feature.

== History ==
Crook County was created by the legislature of the Wyoming Territory on December 8, 1875, from portions of Albany and Laramie Counties. It was organized in 1888.

Crook County was named for Brigadier General George Crook, an army commander during the Indian Wars. In 1890, Crook County lost territory when Weston County was created. Campbell County was formed with land ceded by Crook County in 1911.

== Geography ==
According to the US Census Bureau, the county has a total area of 2,865 square miles (7,420 km^{2}), of which 2,854 square miles (7,390 km^{2}) is land and 11 square miles (28 km^{2}) (0.4%) is water. The lowest point in the state of Wyoming is located on the Belle Fourche River in Crook County, where it flows out of Wyoming and into South Dakota.

Devils Tower National Monument is located in the Bear Lodge Mountains in Crook County.

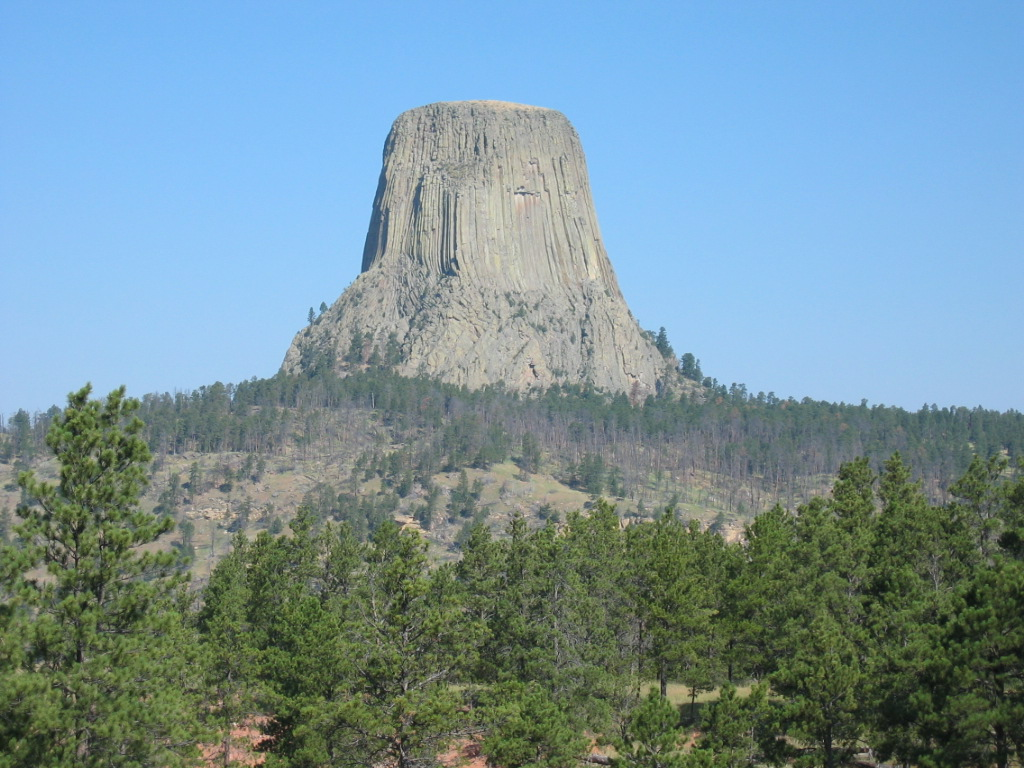
Devils Tower

The Missouri Buttes, at the northwestern end of the Black Hills, are located in the county, 3.5 miles northwest of Devils Tower.

=== Major highways ===
- Interstate 90
- U.S. Highway 14
- U.S. Highway 16
- U.S. Highway 212
- Wyoming Highway 24
- Wyoming Highway 51
- Wyoming Highway 111
- Wyoming Highway 112
- Wyoming Highway 113
- Wyoming Highway 116
- Wyoming Highway 585

=== Adjacent counties ===
- Butte County, South Dakota – northeast
- Lawrence County, South Dakota – east
- Weston County – south
- Campbell County – west
- Powder River County, Montana – northwest
- Carter County, Montana – north

=== National protected areas ===
- Black Hills National Forest (part)
- Devils Tower National Monument
- Thunder Basin National Grassland (part)

== Demographics ==
Historical population
Census	Pop.	Note	%±
1880	239		—
1890	2,338		878.2%
1900	3,137		34.2%
1910	6,492		106.9%
1920	5,524		−14.9%
1930	5,333		−3.5%
1940	5,463		2.4%
1950	4,738		−13.3%
1960	4,691		−1.0%
1970	4,535		−3.3%
1980	5,308		17.0%
1990	5,294		−0.3%
2000	5,887		11.2%
2010	7,083		20.3%
2020	7,181		1.4%
2025 (est.)	7,852	▲	9.3%
US Decennial Census; 1870–2000 2010–2016

=== 2020 census ===
As of the 2020 census, the county had a population of 7,181. Of the residents, 24.4% were under the age of 18 and 23.9% were 65 years of age or older; the median age was 45.5 years. For every 100 females there were 102.3 males, and for every 100 females age 18 and over there were 102.6 males.

Crook County, Wyoming – Racial and ethnic composition Note: the US Census treats Hispanic/Latino as an ethnic category. This table excludes Latinos from the racial categories and assigns them to a separate category. Hispanics/Latinos may be of any race.
Race / Ethnicity (NH = Non-Hispanic)	Pop 2000	Pop 2010	Pop 2020	% 2000	% 2010	% 2020
White alone (NH)	5,729	6,794	6,766	97.32%	95.92%	94.22%
Black or African American alone (NH)	3	14	0	0.05%	0.20%	0.00%
Native American or Alaska Native alone (NH)	57	46	43	0.97%	0.65%	0.60%
Asian alone (NH)	4	11	9	0.07%	0.16%	0.13%
Pacific Islander alone (NH)	0	0	7	0.00%	0.00%	0.10%
Other race alone (NH)	3	3	16	0.05%	0.04%	0.22%
Mixed race or Multiracial (NH)	37	74	228	0.63%	1.04%	3.17%
Hispanic or Latino (any race)	54	141	112	0.92%	1.99%	1.56%
Total	5,887	7,083	7,181	100.00%	100.00%	100.00%

The racial makeup of the county was 94.6% White, none Black or African American, 0.8% American Indian and Alaska Native, 0.2% Asian, 0.6% from some other race, and 3.8% from two or more races. Hispanic or Latino residents of any race comprised 1.6% of the population.

There were 2,943 households in the county, of which 26.2% had children under the age of 18 living with them and 18.1% had a female householder with no spouse or partner present. About 27.1% of all households were made up of individuals and 14.4% had someone living alone who was 65 years of age or older.

There were 3,672 housing units, of which 19.9% were vacant. Among occupied housing units, 82.3% were owner-occupied and 17.7% were renter-occupied. The homeowner vacancy rate was 2.0% and the rental vacancy rate was 12.7%.

=== 2010 census ===
As of the 2010 United States census, there were 7,083 people, 2,921 households, and 2,016 families in the county. The population density was 2.5 people per square mile (0.97 people/km^{2}). There were 3,595 housing units at an average density of 1.3 units per square mile (0.50 units/km^{2}). The racial makeup of the county was 97.2% white, 0.7% American Indian, 0.2% black or African American, 0.2% Asian, 0.6% from other races, and 1.2% from two or more races. Those of Hispanic or Latino origin made up 2.0% of the population. In terms of ancestry, 38.8% were German, 16.5% were English, 14.5% were Irish, 9.5% were Swedish, and 3.8% were American.

Of the 2,921 households, 28.4% had children under the age of 18 living with them, 59.2% were married couples living together, 6.5% had a female householder with no husband present, 31.0% were non-families, and 25.0% of all households were made up of individuals. The average household size was 2.41 and the average family size was 2.90. The median age was 43.6 years.

The median income for a household in the county was $49,890 and the median income for a family was $55,765. Males had a median income of $47,821 versus $32,217 for females. The per capita income for the county was $24,520. About 6.5% of families and 7.8% of the population were below the poverty line, including 10.8% of those under age 18 and 8.0% of those age 65 or over.

=== 2000 census ===
As of the 2000 United States census, of 2000, there were 5,887 people, 2,308 households, and 1,645 families in the county. The population density was 2 people per square mile (0.77 people/km^{2}). There were 2,935 housing units at an average density of 1.0 units per square mile (0.39 units/km^{2}). The racial makeup of the county was 97.86% White, 0.05% Black or African American, 1.02% Native American, 0.07% Asian, 0.25% from other races, and 0.75% from two or more races. 0.92% of the population were Hispanic or Latino of any race. 34.1% were of German, 14.6% English, 7.8% Irish and 6.8% American ancestry.

There were 2,308 households, out of which 32.30% had children under the age of 18 living with them, 62.30% were married couples living together, 5.40% had a female householder with no husband present, and 28.70% were non-families. 24.90% of all households were made up of individuals, and 10.30% had someone living alone who was 65 years of age or older. The average household size was 2.51 and the average family size was 3.01.

The county population contained 26.90% under the age of 18, 6.60% from 18 to 24, 24.60% from 25 to 44, 27.20% from 45 to 64, and 14.70% who were 65 years of age or older. The median age was 40 years. For every 100 females there were 102.40 males. For every 100 females age 18 and over, there were 101.80 males.

The median income for a household in the county was $35,601, and the median income for a family was $43,105. Males had a median income of $34,483 versus $18,967 for females, indicating a relatively high level of income inequality based on gender. The per capita income for the county was $17,379. About 7.8% of families and 9.10% of the population were below the poverty line, including 9.90% of those under age 18 and 11.80% of those age 65 or over.

Religion in Crook County, according to ARDA (2020)
1. LDS Church (13.2%)
2. Evangelical Churches (13.1%)
3. Catholic Church (8.90%)
4. Mainline Protestant Churches (4.40%)
5. Anabaptist Church ( Amish ) (2.40%)
6. Others (0.10%)
7. None* (57.1%)

== Politics ==
Crook County is an overwhelmingly Republican county, both in state and federal elections. The last Democratic candidate to carry the county was Franklin D. Roosevelt in 1932, and indeed Roosevelt in the following election – when he lost to Alf Landon by six percentage points – constitutes the last Democrat to pass forty percent. In the last 12 Presidential elections the Democratic candidate has consistently received less than 23.5% of the county's vote. In the 21st century, no Democrat has won even 17% of the vote and every Republican has won over 80% of the vote. In 2016, Crook County was the most Republican county in the most Republican state.

United States presidential election results for Crook County, Wyoming
Year	Republican		Democratic		Third party(ies)	
Year	No.	%	No.	%	No.	%
1892	399	42.72%	0	0.00%	535	57.28%
1896	524	47.68%	569	51.77%	6	0.55%
1900	692	56.58%	531	43.42%	0	0.00%
1904	984	64.27%	475	31.03%	72	4.70%
1908	1,068	54.46%	799	40.74%	94	4.79%
1912	505	26.98%	726	38.78%	641	34.24%
1916	846	40.54%	1,181	56.59%	60	2.87%
1920	934	67.24%	451	32.47%	4	0.29%
1924	978	54.48%	468	26.07%	349	19.44%
1928	1,466	71.41%	582	28.35%	5	0.24%
1932	1,062	44.01%	1,317	54.58%	34	1.41%
1936	1,218	51.83%	1,088	46.30%	44	1.87%
1940	1,359	60.86%	869	38.92%	5	0.22%
1944	1,244	64.32%	690	35.68%	0	0.00%
1948	1,166	61.63%	712	37.63%	14	0.74%
1952	1,734	79.80%	423	19.47%	16	0.74%
1956	1,139	72.78%	426	27.22%	0	0.00%
1960	1,537	72.84%	573	27.16%	0	0.00%
1964	1,214	60.88%	780	39.12%	0	0.00%
1968	1,240	71.55%	318	18.35%	175	10.10%
1972	1,760	83.41%	339	16.07%	11	0.52%
1976	1,438	67.23%	653	30.53%	48	2.24%
1980	1,909	79.01%	413	17.09%	94	3.89%
1984	2,286	83.01%	450	16.34%	18	0.65%
1988	1,939	76.34%	553	21.77%	48	1.89%
1992	1,377	51.32%	568	21.17%	738	27.51%
1996	1,698	60.93%	651	23.36%	438	15.72%
2000	2,289	83.60%	361	13.18%	88	3.21%
2004	2,836	83.51%	501	14.75%	59	1.74%
2008	2,967	80.56%	612	16.62%	104	2.82%
2012	3,109	84.37%	426	11.56%	150	4.07%
2016	3,348	87.51%	273	7.14%	205	5.36%
2020	3,651	88.64%	378	9.18%	90	2.18%
2024	3,805	87.59%	443	10.20%	96	2.21%

In the Wyoming Senate the county is represented by Republican Ogden Driskill since 2011. In the Wyoming House of Representatives it has been represented by Republican Chip Neiman since 2021.

== Communities ==
=== Towns ===
- Hulett
- Moorcroft
- Pine Haven
- Sundance (county seat)

=== Census-designated place ===
- Beulah

=== Unincorporated communities ===
- Aladdin
- Alva
- Carlile
- Colony
- Devils Tower
- Farrall
- Moskee
- New Haven
- Oshoto
- Sand Creek Crossing
- Stroner

== See also ==
- National Register of Historic Places listings in Crook County, Wyoming
- Wyoming
  - List of cities and towns in Wyoming
  - List of counties in Wyoming
  - Wyoming statistical areas
