= Pine Haven, Wyoming =

- Town
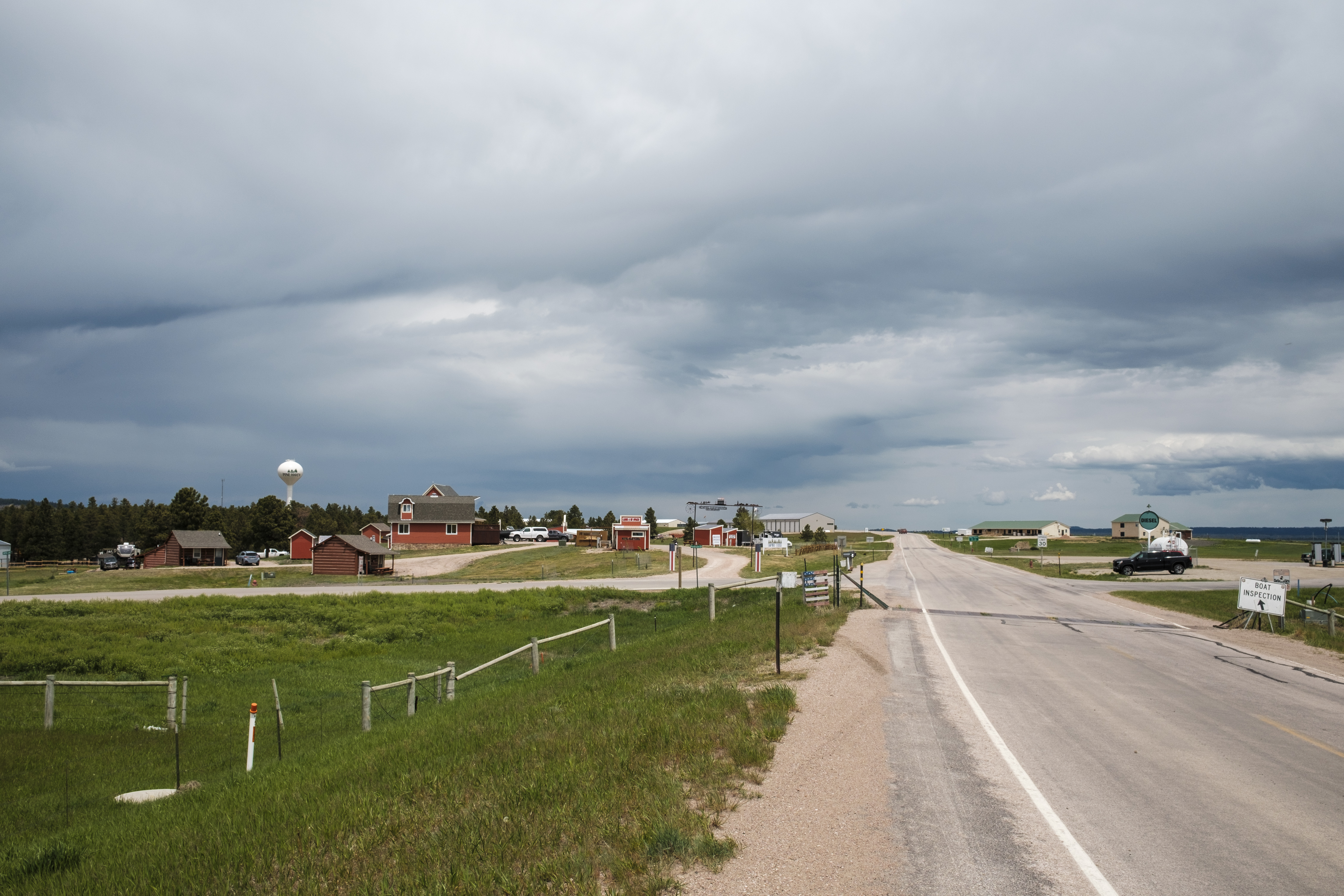
- Pine Haven Road entering Pine Haven

- Location of Pine Haven in Crook County, Wyoming
- Coordinates: 44°21′12″N 104°48′38″W
- Country: United States
- State: Wyoming
- County: Crook

Area
  - Total: 1.32 sq mi (3.41 km^{2})
  - Land: 1.32 sq mi (3.41 km^{2})
  - Water: 0 sq mi (0.00 km^{2})
- Elevation: 4,160 ft (1,270 m)

Population (2020)
  - Total: 493
  - Density: 416.1/sq mi (160.65/km^{2})
- Time zone: UTC-7 (Mountain (MST))
  - Summer (DST): UTC-6 (MDT)
- ZIP code: 82721
- Area code: 307
- FIPS code: 56-61610
- GNIS feature ID: 2413132
- Website: pinehavenwy.govoffice2.com

Pine Haven is a town in Crook County, Wyoming, United States. The population was 493 at the 2020 census.

The town was founded by a number of families, but Coop and Betty Waters are believed to have made the Pine Haven community take form.

== Geography ==
According to the United States Census Bureau, the town has a total area of 1.31 square miles (3.39 km^{2}), all land.

== Demographics ==
Historical population
Census	Pop.	Note	%±
1990	141		—
2000	222		57.4%
2010	490		120.7%
2020	493		0.6%
U.S. Decennial Census

=== 2010 census ===
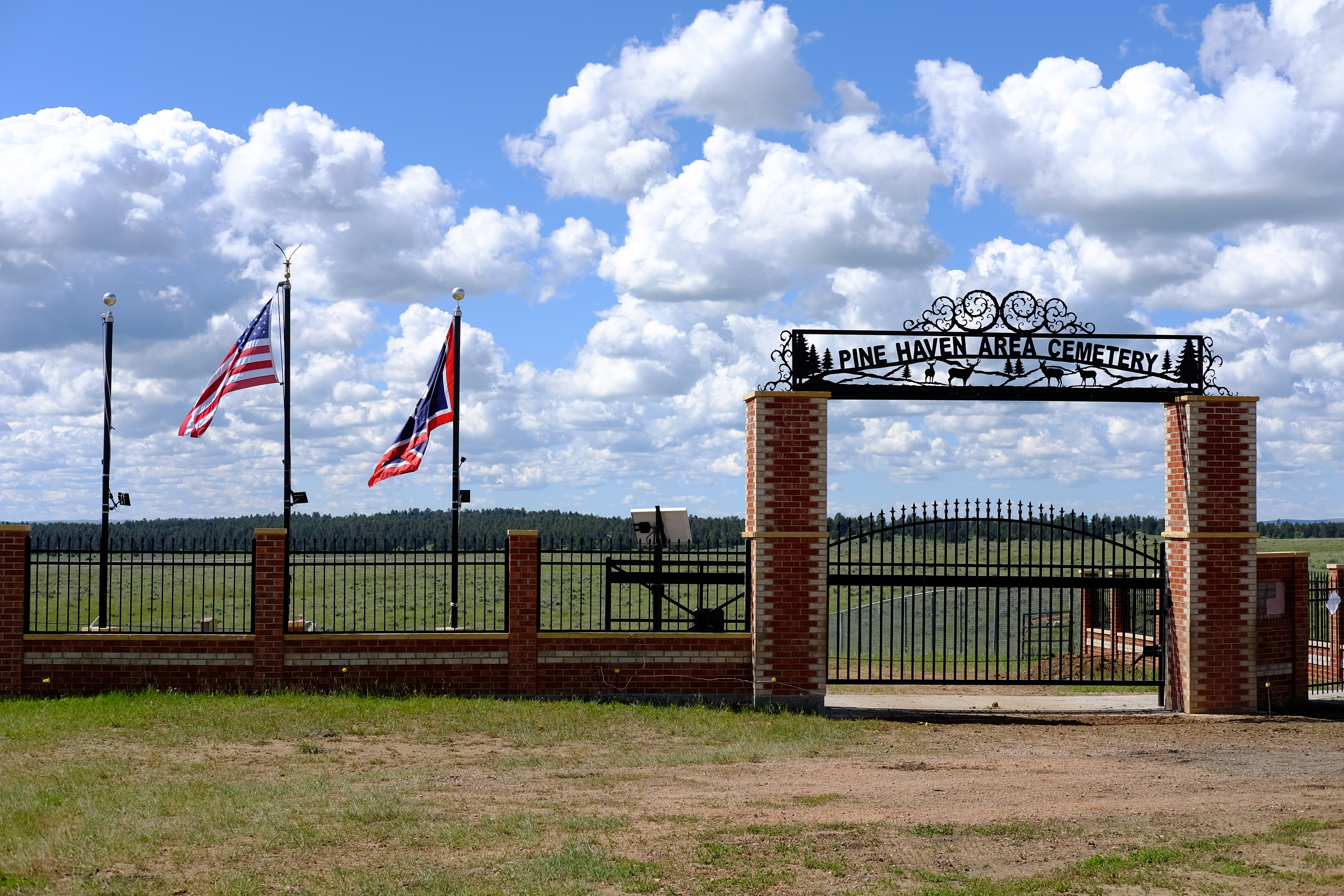
Pine Haven Area Cemetery

As of the census of 2010, there were 490 people, 209 households, and 155 families residing in the town. The population density was 374.0 inhabitants per square mile (144.4/km^{2}). There were 258 housing units at an average density of 196.9 per square mile (76.0/km^{2}). The racial makeup of the town was 98.0% White, 1.0% Native American, 0.2% Asian, and 0.8% from two or more races. Hispanic or Latino of any race were 1.0% of the population.

There were 209 households, of which 21.1% had children under the age of 18 living with them, 68.9% were married couples living together, 1.9% had a female householder with no husband present, 3.3% had a male householder with no wife present, and 25.8% were non-families. 19.1% of all households were made up of individuals, and 8.1% had someone living alone who was 65 years of age or older. The average household size was 2.34 and the average family size was 2.67.

The median age in the town was 50.5 years. 17.6% of residents were under the age of 18; 4.9% were between the ages of 18 and 24; 19.2% were from 25 to 44; 41.8% were from 45 to 64; and 16.5% were 65 years of age or older. The gender makeup of the town was 51.0% male and 49.0% female.

=== 2000 census ===
As of the census of 2000, there were 222 people, 102 households, and 68 families residing in the town. The population density was 169.9 people per square mile (65.6 people/km^{2}). There were 157 housing units at an average density of 120.2 per square mile (46.4/km^{2}). The racial makeup of the town was 96.40% White, 1.80% Native American, and 1.80% from two or more races.

There were 102 households, out of which 21.6% had children under the age of 18 living with them, 64.7% were married couples living together, 1.0% had a female householder with no husband present, and 33.3% were non-families. 28.4% of all households were made up of individuals, and 13.7% had someone living alone who was 65 years of age or older. The average household size was 2.18 and the average family size was 2.68.

In the town, the population was spread out, with 17.6% under the age of 18, 2.7% from 18 to 24, 21.6% from 25 to 44, 43.7% from 45 to 64, and 14.4% who were 65 years of age or older. The median age was 48 years. For every 100 females, there were 107.5 males. For every 100 females age 18 and over, there were 115.3 males.

The median income for a household in the town was $37,250, and the median income for a family was $46,250. Males had a median income of $39,583 versus $35,625 for females. The per capita income for the town was $21,014. About 4.6% of families and 4.1% of the population were below the poverty line, including none of those under the age of eighteen or sixty five or over.

== Education ==
Public education in the town of Pine Haven is provided by Crook County School District #1. Zoned campuses include Moorcroft Elementary School (grades K–6) and Moorcroft Secondary School (grades 7–12).

== Public Safety ==
=== Fire Department ===
Pine Haven is served by the Pine Haven Volunteer Fire Department which operates out of a fire station at 24 Waters Drive and provides fire prevention and suppression services to this town.
