= Hulett, Wyoming =

- Town
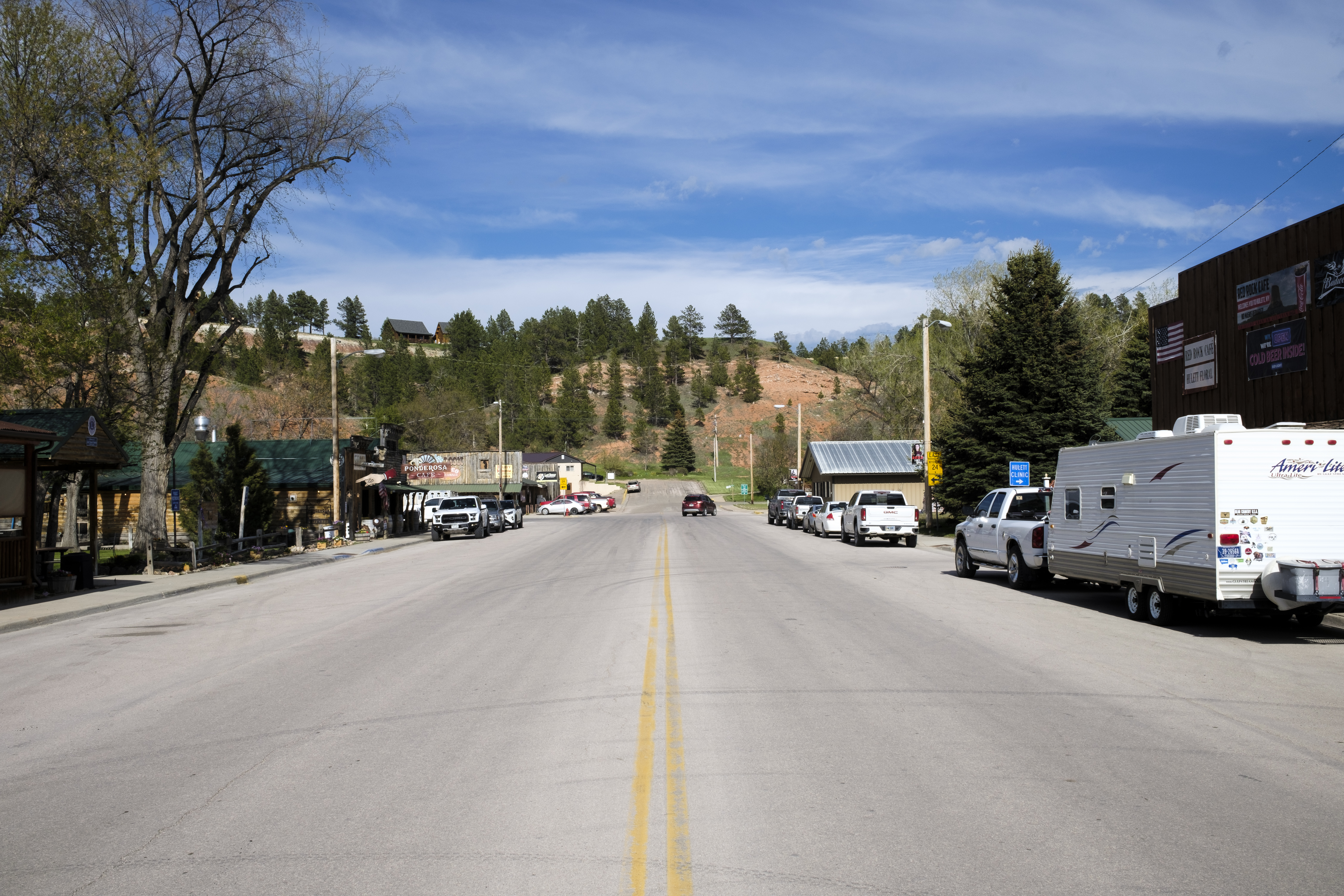
- Main Street (WY Hwy 24) in Hulett

- Location of Hulett in Crook County, Wyoming
- Coordinates: 44°40′59″N 104°35′53″W
- Country: United States
- State: Wyoming
- County: Crook

Area
  - Total: 0.86 sq mi (2.23 km^{2})
  - Land: 0.86 sq mi (2.23 km^{2})
  - Water: 0 sq mi (0.00 km^{2})
- Elevation: 3,747 ft (1,142 m)

Population (2020)
  - Total: 309
  - Density: 495.0/sq mi (191.12/km^{2})
- Time zone: UTC−7 (Mountain (MST))
  - Summer (DST): UTC−6 (MDT)
- ZIP code: 82720
- Area code: 307
- FIPS code: 56-39105
- GNIS feature ID: 2412780
- Website: townofhulettwy.com

Hulett is a town in Crook County, Wyoming, United States. The population was 309 at the 2020 census.

== Geography ==
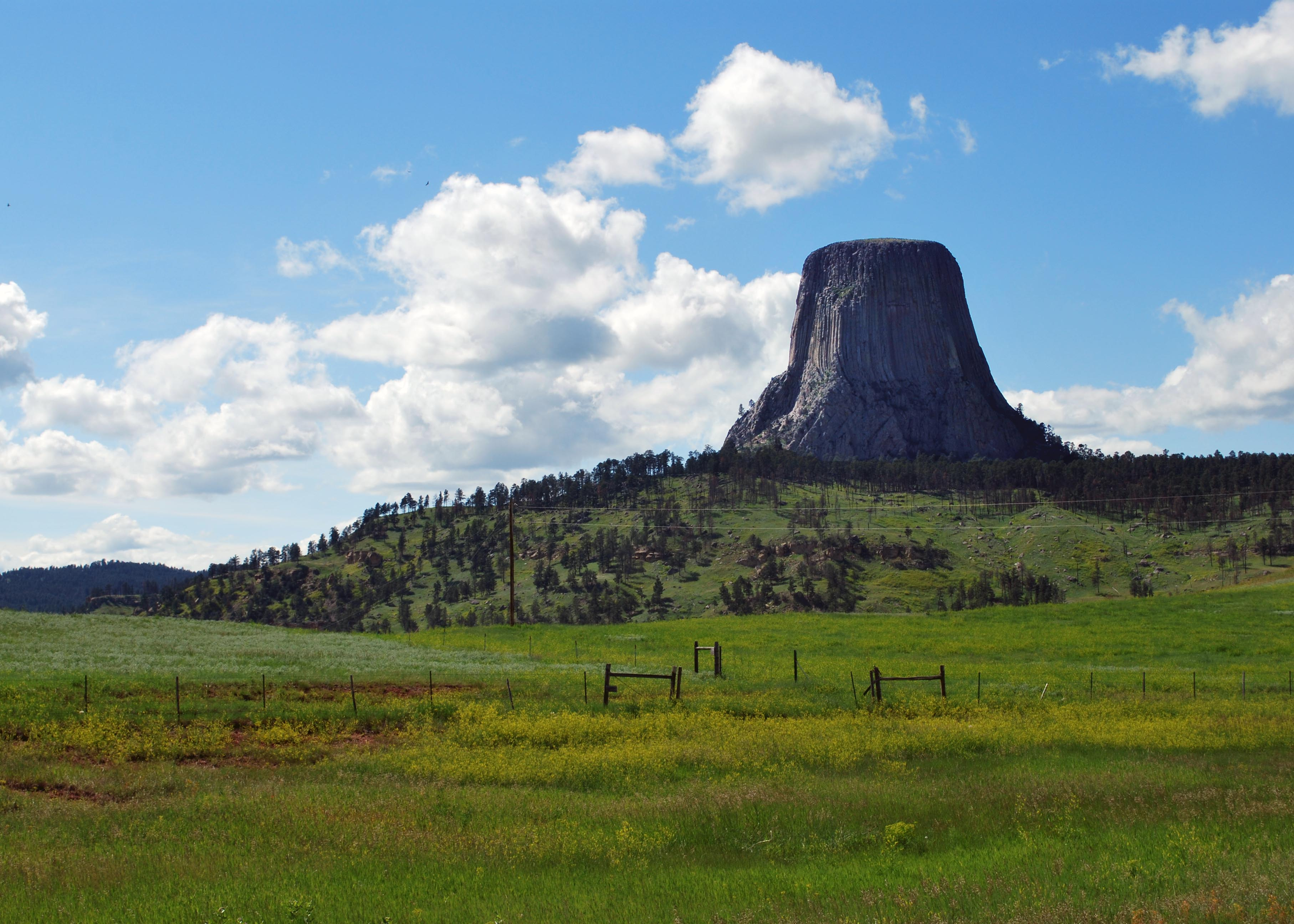
Devils Tower

Devils Tower, the first proclaimed United States national monument, is 9 miles (14 km) away. According to the United States Census Bureau, the town has a total area of 0.87 square miles (2.25 km^{2}), all land. The Belle Fourche River bisects the town.

== Climate ==
Climate data for Hulett, Wyoming, 1991–2020 normals, 1941-2020 extremes: 3758ft (1145m)
Month	Jan	Feb	Mar	Apr	May	Jun	Jul	Aug	Sep	Oct	Nov	Dec	Year
Record high °F (°C)	65 (18)	70 (21)	79 (26)	87 (31)	98 (37)	105 (41)	107 (42)	104 (40)	100 (38)	95 (35)	78 (26)	65 (18)	107 (42)
Mean maximum °F (°C)	52.6 (11.4)	56.3 (13.5)	70.4 (21.3)	78.3 (25.7)	86.1 (30.1)	93.6 (34.2)	98.6 (37.0)	97.9 (36.6)	93.5 (34.2)	82.5 (28.1)	66.3 (19.1)	54.2 (12.3)	100.1 (37.8)
Mean daily maximum °F (°C)	33.9 (1.1)	36.6 (2.6)	47.4 (8.6)	55.5 (13.1)	65.9 (18.8)	77.0 (25.0)	86.0 (30.0)	85.2 (29.6)	74.8 (23.8)	59.2 (15.1)	44.8 (7.1)	35.3 (1.8)	58.5 (14.7)
Daily mean °F (°C)	22.4 (−5.3)	24.6 (−4.1)	34.5 (1.4)	42.5 (5.8)	52.9 (11.6)	63.1 (17.3)	70.7 (21.5)	68.9 (20.5)	58.7 (14.8)	45.4 (7.4)	32.9 (0.5)	23.7 (−4.6)	45.0 (7.2)
Mean daily minimum °F (°C)	10.9 (−11.7)	12.6 (−10.8)	21.6 (−5.8)	29.5 (−1.4)	39.8 (4.3)	49.2 (9.6)	55.4 (13.0)	52.7 (11.5)	42.5 (5.8)	31.6 (−0.2)	21.0 (−6.1)	12.1 (−11.1)	31.6 (−0.2)
Mean minimum °F (°C)	−14.1 (−25.6)	−11.2 (−24.0)	0.1 (−17.7)	13.9 (−10.1)	25.5 (−3.6)	37.3 (2.9)	45.3 (7.4)	41.0 (5.0)	29.5 (−1.4)	16.0 (−8.9)	−0.8 (−18.2)	−11.0 (−23.9)	−21.8 (−29.9)
Record low °F (°C)	−44 (−42)	−38 (−39)	−28 (−33)	−8 (−22)	8 (−13)	24 (−4)	35 (2)	25 (−4)	17 (−8)	3 (−16)	−23 (−31)	−33 (−36)	−44 (−42)
Average precipitation inches (mm)	0.59 (15)	0.63 (16)	1.09 (28)	2.09 (53)	3.06 (78)	3.00 (76)	2.07 (53)	1.27 (32)	1.18 (30)	2.00 (51)	0.83 (21)	0.54 (14)	18.35 (467)
Average snowfall inches (cm)	7.60 (19.3)	7.90 (20.1)	9.70 (24.6)	6.20 (15.7)	1.00 (2.5)	0.00 (0.00)	0.00 (0.00)	0.00 (0.00)	0.10 (0.25)	3.30 (8.4)	6.80 (17.3)	6.60 (16.8)	49.2 (124.95)
Source 1: NOAA
Source 2: XMACIS (records & monthly max/mins)

== Demographics ==
Historical population
Census	Pop.	Note	%±
1960	335		—
1970	318		−5.1%
1980	291		−8.5%
1990	429		47.4%
2000	408		−4.9%
2010	383		−6.1%
2020	309		−19.3%
2024 (est.)	341	▲	10.4%
U.S. Decennial Census

=== 2010 census ===
As of the census of 2010, there were 383 people, 164 households, and 102 families residing in the town. The population density was 440.2 inhabitants per square mile (170.0/km^{2}). There were 207 housing units at an average density of 237.9 per square mile (91.9/km^{2}). The racial makeup of the town was 97.4% White, 0.5% Native American, and 2.1% from two or more races. Hispanic or Latino of any race were 1.3% of the population.

There were 164 households, of which 32.9% had children under the age of 18 living with them, 47.0% were married couples living together, 11.6% had a female householder with no husband present, 3.7% had a male householder with no wife present, and 37.8% were non-families. 32.9% of all households were made up of individuals, and 11% had someone living alone who was 65 years of age or older. The average household size was 2.34 and the average family size was 2.99.

The median age in the town was 39.8 years. 26.9% of residents were under the age of 18; 6% were between the ages of 18 and 24; 25% were from 25 to 44; 29.7% were from 45 to 64; and 12.3% were 65 years of age or older. The gender makeup of the town was 52.5% male and 47.5% female.

=== 2000 census ===
As of the census of 2000, there were 407 people, 173 households, and 106 families residing in the town. The population density was 468.5 people per square mile (181.1/km^{2}). There were 211 housing units at an average density of 242.3 per square mile (93.6/km^{2}). The racial makeup of the town was 98.28% White, 0.49% Native American, and 1.23% from two or more races. Hispanic or Latino of any race were 0.98% of the population.

There were 173 households, out of which 32.4% had children under the age of 18 living with them, 53.2% were married couples living together, 4.6% had a female householder with no husband present, and 38.7% were non-families. 35.3% of all households were made up of individuals, and 16.8% had someone living alone who was 65 years of age or older. The average household size was 2.36 and the average family size was 3.15.

In the town, the population was spread out, with 28.9% under the age of 18, 8.1% from 18 to 24, 26.7% from 25 to 44, 19.9% from 45 to 64, and 16.4% who were 65 years of age or older. The median age was 36 years. For every 100 females, there were 97.1 males. For every 100 females age 18 and over, there were 97.3 males.

The median income for a household in the town was $23,125, and the median income for a family was $31,250. Males had a median income of $27,875 versus $15,455 for females. The per capita income for the town was $12,582. About 11.9% of families and 15.8% of the population were below the poverty line, including 23.9% of those under age 18 and 16.4% of those age 65 or over.

== Education ==
Public education in the town of Hulett is provided by Crook County School District #1. Hulett School, a K-12 campus, serves the town.

Hulett has a public library, a branch of the Crook County Public Library System.

== Transportation ==
Hulett is served by Hulett Municipal Airport which is owned by the Town of Hulett.
