= Belle Fourche River =

River in Wyoming and South Dakota, United States of America

Coordinates: 44°26′00″N 102°18′11″W

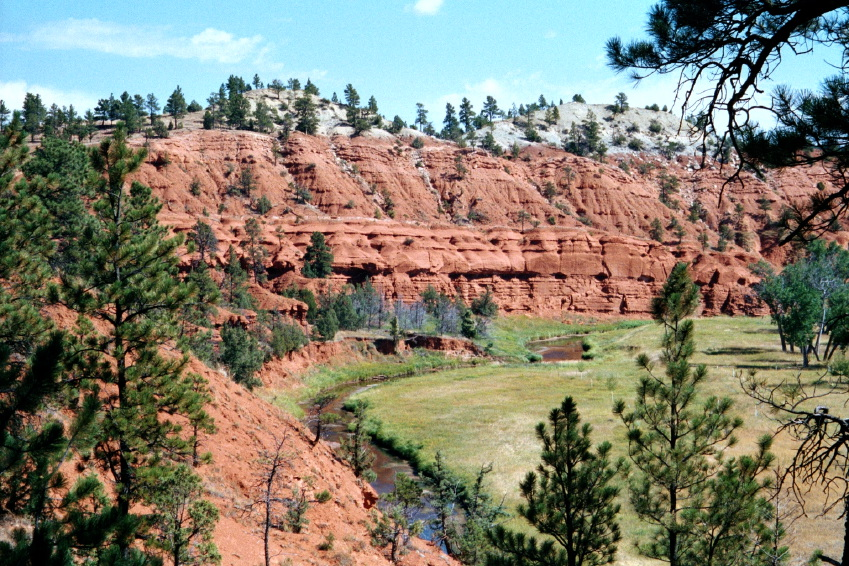
A view of the upper course of the Belle Fourche River in Devils Tower National Monument

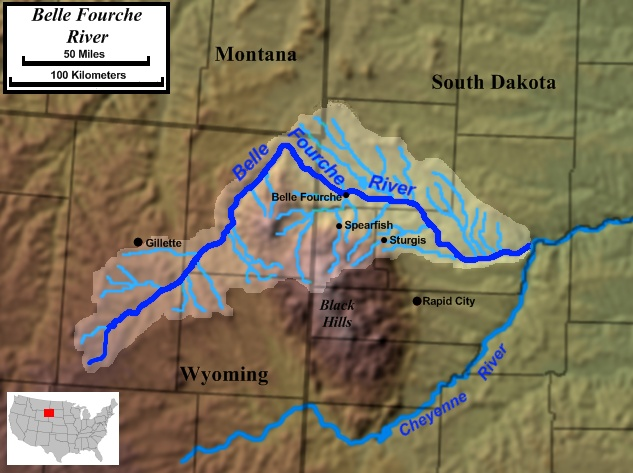
Course and watershed of the Belle Fourche River

The Belle Fourche River (pronounced bel FOOSH; Lakota: Šahíyela Wakpá) is a tributary of the Cheyenne River, about 290 miles (470 km) long, in the U.S. states of Wyoming and South Dakota. It is part of the Mississippi River watershed via the Cheyenne and Missouri Rivers. In the latter part of the 19th century, the Belle Fourche River was known as the North Fork of the Cheyenne River. Belle Fourche is a name derived from French, meaning "beautiful fork".

== Course ==
It rises in northeastern Wyoming, in southern Campbell County, around 18 mi (29 km) southwest of Wright. It flows northeast around the north side of the Bear Lodge Mountains, past Moorcroft and Devils Tower. Near the state line with Montana, it turns abruptly southeast and flows in western South Dakota, past Belle Fourche and around the north side of the Black Hills. In southern Meade County near Hereford, it turns east-northeast and joins the Cheyenne roughly 50 mi (80 km) east-northeast of Rapid City.

The point at which the river flows out of Wyoming and into South Dakota is the lowest elevation point in Wyoming at 3,099 ft (945 m). This is the second-highest low point of any U.S. state. At Elm Springs, the river has an average discharge of 397 cu ft/s (11.2 m^{3}/s)

== Usage ==
The river provides significant recreation and irrigation for agriculture in western South Dakota. The total irrigation area of the river in South Dakota is approximately 57,000 acres (23,000 ha).

== See also ==
- List of rivers of South Dakota
- List of rivers of Wyoming
