= Sundance, Wyoming =

Sundance, Wyoming Owíwaŋyaŋg Wačhí
- Town
- Old wooden jail (left) and stone school building in Sundance

- Location of Sundance in Crook County, Wyoming
- Coordinates: 44°24′23″N 104°22′33″W
- Country: United States
- State: Wyoming
- County: Crook

Area
  - Total: 3.06 sq mi (7.93 km^{2})
  - Land: 3.05 sq mi (7.90 km^{2})
  - Water: 0.0077 sq mi (0.02 km^{2})
- Elevation: 4,738 ft (1,444 m)

Population (2020)
  - Total: 1,032
  - Estimate (2019): 1,292
  - Density: 423.4/sq mi (163.49/km^{2})
- Time zone: UTC-7 (Mountain (MST))
  - Summer (DST): UTC-6 (MDT)
- ZIP code: 82729
- Area code: 307
- FIPS code: 56-74195
- GNIS feature ID: 2413351
- Website: http://www.cityofsundancewy.com/

Sundance (Lakota: Owíwaŋyaŋg Wačhí; "Sun-watching Dance") is a town in and the county seat of Crook County, Wyoming, United States. Its population was 1,032 at the 2020 census. The town is named after the Sun Dance ceremony practiced by several American Indian tribes.

== History ==
Sundance was established in 1875 as a trading post. The Sundance Kid was arrested for a theft he committed here in 1887, the only time he was ever incarcerated, and he took the town's name as a nickname.

== Demographics ==
Historical population
Census	Pop.	Note	%±
1890	515		—
1900	294		−42.9%
1910	281		−4.4%
1920	328		16.7%
1930	369		12.5%
1940	685		85.6%
1950	893		30.4%
1960	908		1.7%
1970	1,056		16.3%
1980	1,087		2.9%
1990	1,139		4.8%
2000	1,161		1.9%
2010	1,182		1.8%
2020	1,032		−12.7%
1890-2010 census

=== 2010 census ===
As of the census of 2010, 1,182 people, 532 households, and 326 families lived in the town. The population density was 387.5 inhabitants per square mile (149.6/km^{2}). The 606 housing units had an average density of 198.7 per square mile (76.7/km^{2}). The racial makeup of the town was 97.8% White, 0.2% African American, 0.8% Native American, 0.4% from other races, and 0.8% from two or more races. Hispanics or Latinos of any race were 1.2% of the population.

Of the 532 households, 25.0% had children under 18 living with them, 51.5% were married couples living together, 8.3% had a female householder with no husband present, 1.5% had a male householder with no wife present, and 38.7% were not families. About 33.5% of all households were made up of individuals, and 16.6% had someone living alone who was 65 or older. The average household size was 2.16, and the average family size was 2.76.

The median age in the town was 47.5 years; 19.3% of residents were under 18; 6.1% were between 18 and 24; 19.5% were from 25 to 44; 31% were from 45 to 64; and 24% were 65 or older. The gender makeup of the town was 49.1% male and 50.9% female.

=== 2000 census ===
As of the census of 2000, 1,161 people, 476 households, and 318 families resided in the town. The population density was 582.2 people per square mile (225.3/km^{2}). The 545 housing units had an average density of 273.3 per square mile (105.7/km^{2}). The racial makeup of the town was 96.64% White, 1.64% Native American, 0.17% Asian, 0.17% from other races, and 1.38% from two or more races. Hispanics or Latinos of any race were 0.60% of the population.

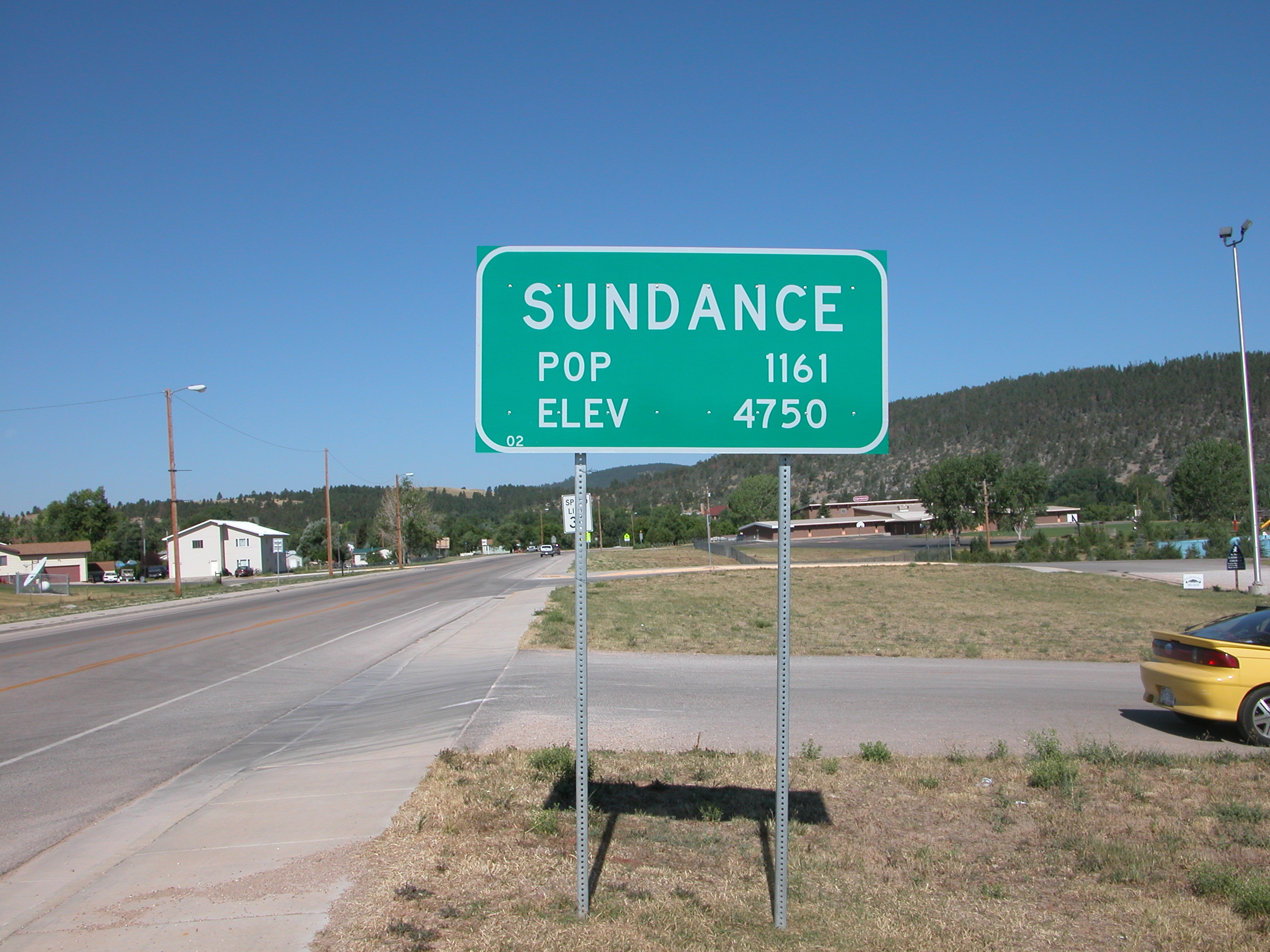
Sundance city limit sign on WYO 585, August 2003

Of the 476 households, 27.7% had children under 18 living with them, 59.0% were married couples living together, 6.1% had a female householder with no husband present, and 33.0% were not families. About 29.4% of all households were made up of individuals, and 14.3% had someone living alone who was 65 or older. The average household size was 2.34, and the average family size was 2.91.

In the town, the age distribution was 24.1% under 18, 5.8% from 18 to 24, 24.7% from 25 to 44, 24.3% from 45 to 64, and 21.1% who were 65 or older. The median age was 42 years. For every 100 females, there were 95.1 males. For every 100 females 18 and over, there were 87.4 males.

The median income for a household in the town was $41,029, and for a family was $50,598. Males had a median income of $33,750 versus $21,000 for females. The per capita income for the town was $18,300. About 3.2% of families and 6.4% of the population were below the poverty line, including 4.8% of those under 18 and 13.5% of those 65 or over.

== Geography ==
According to the United States Census Bureau, the town has a total area of 3.06 square miles (7.93 km^{2}), of which 0.01 square miles (0.03 km^{2}) is covered by water.

The town is directly south of the Bear Lodge Mountains, part of the Black Hills National Forest.

=== Skyline ===
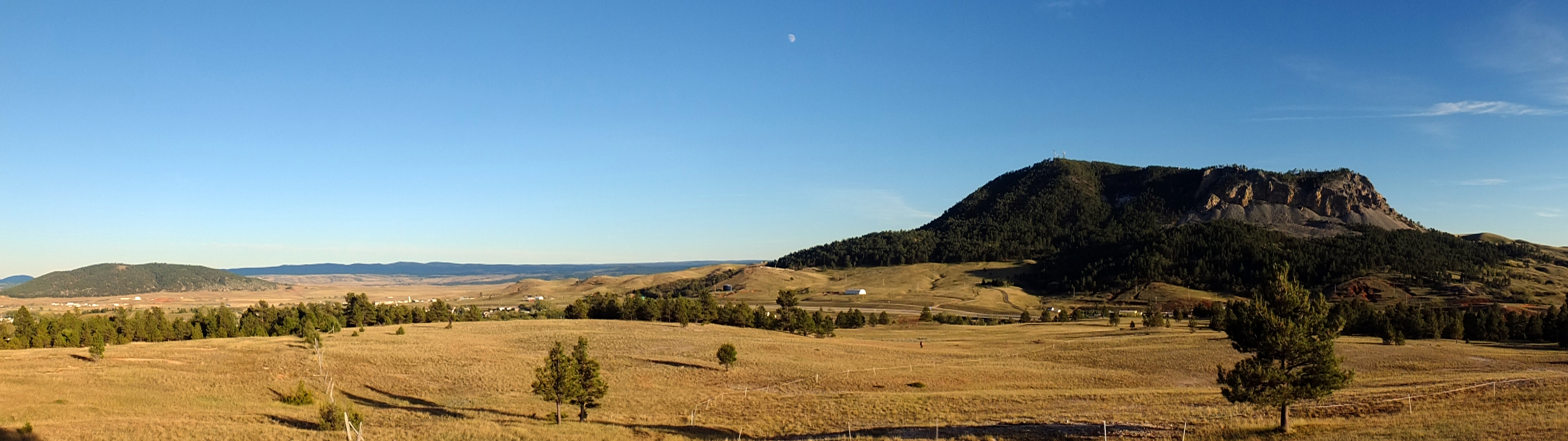
Looking down on the town of Sundance from Moriah Hill, October 2014

=== Climate ===
Sundance experiences a humid continental climate (Köppen climate classification Dfb) with higher precipitation than the semiarid regions surrounding it due to its location in the Black Hills.

Climate data for Sundance, Wyoming (1991–2020 normals; extremes 1893–present)
Month	Jan	Feb	Mar	Apr	May	Jun	Jul	Aug	Sep	Oct	Nov	Dec	Year
Record high °F (°C)	65 (18)	66 (19)	77 (25)	86 (30)	101 (38)	102 (39)	105 (41)	102 (39)	99 (37)	93 (34)	77 (25)	65 (18)	105 (41)
Mean maximum °F (°C)	51.4 (10.8)	52.7 (11.5)	65.9 (18.8)	74.8 (23.8)	83.4 (28.6)	91.1 (32.8)	96.0 (35.6)	94.4 (34.7)	89.6 (32.0)	78.5 (25.8)	63.9 (17.7)	52.1 (11.2)	97.3 (36.3)
Mean daily maximum °F (°C)	32.7 (0.4)	34.1 (1.2)	44.2 (6.8)	52.2 (11.2)	62.6 (17.0)	73.1 (22.8)	82.0 (27.8)	80.8 (27.1)	71.4 (21.9)	55.8 (13.2)	42.2 (5.7)	32.5 (0.3)	55.3 (12.9)
Daily mean °F (°C)	23.0 (−5.0)	23.9 (−4.5)	33.2 (0.7)	40.7 (4.8)	50.9 (10.5)	60.9 (16.1)	68.7 (20.4)	67.3 (19.6)	58.1 (14.5)	44.2 (6.8)	32.1 (0.1)	23.1 (−4.9)	43.8 (6.6)
Mean daily minimum °F (°C)	13.2 (−10.4)	13.7 (−10.2)	22.2 (−5.4)	29.2 (−1.6)	39.2 (4.0)	48.8 (9.3)	55.5 (13.1)	53.8 (12.1)	44.8 (7.1)	32.6 (0.3)	22.1 (−5.5)	13.7 (−10.2)	32.4 (0.2)
Mean minimum °F (°C)	−10.3 (−23.5)	−10.0 (−23.3)	−1.0 (−18.3)	12.7 (−10.7)	25.0 (−3.9)	37.0 (2.8)	44.6 (7.0)	41.9 (5.5)	29.9 (−1.2)	13.7 (−10.2)	0.6 (−17.4)	−9.3 (−22.9)	−19.7 (−28.7)
Record low °F (°C)	−39 (−39)	−42 (−41)	−24 (−31)	−11 (−24)	7 (−14)	25 (−4)	30 (−1)	30 (−1)	6 (−14)	−17 (−27)	−23 (−31)	−40 (−40)	−42 (−41)
Average precipitation inches (mm)	0.82 (21)	0.89 (23)	1.04 (26)	2.48 (63)	3.47 (88)	3.03 (77)	2.48 (63)	1.71 (43)	1.32 (34)	1.71 (43)	0.91 (23)	0.51 (13)	20.37 (517)
Average snowfall inches (cm)	12.9 (33)	14.7 (37)	10.3 (26)	13.2 (34)	1.5 (3.8)	0.0 (0.0)	0.0 (0.0)	0.0 (0.0)	0.9 (2.3)	5.8 (15)	9.8 (25)	12.2 (31)	81.3 (207)
Average precipitation days (≥ 0.01 in)	8.5	8.8	8.6	11.9	12.7	10.9	9.3	6.9	6.7	8.5	7.5	7.5	107.8
Average snowy days (≥ 0.1 in)	8.6	7.8	5.9	5.2	0.7	0.0	0.0	0.0	0.3	2.5	5.6	7.5	44.1
Source: NOAA

== Education ==
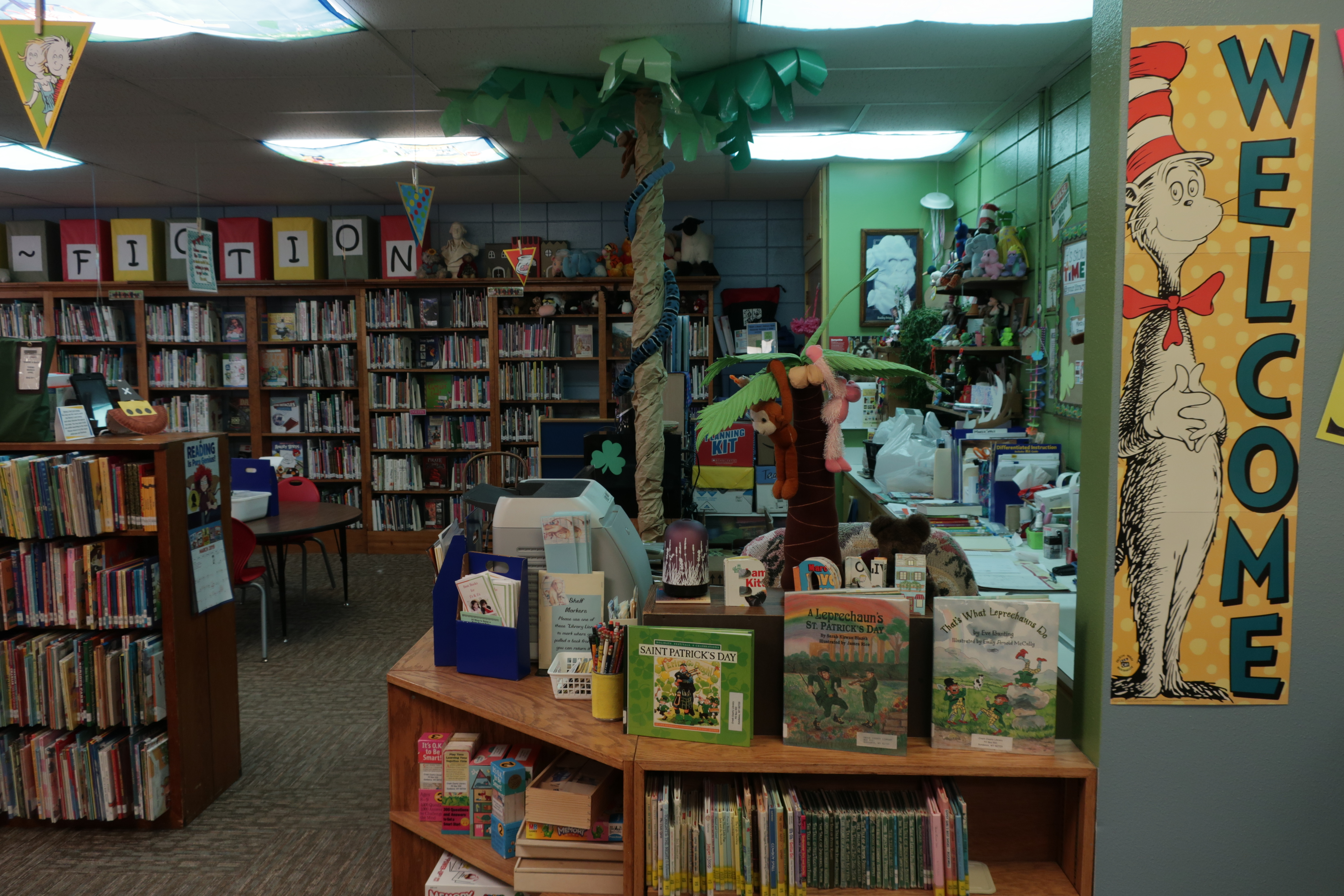
Crook County Public Library main branch children's section in Sundance

Public education in the town of Sundance is provided by Crook County School District #1. Zoned campuses include Sundance Elementary School (kindergarten - grade 6), and Sundance Secondary School (grades 7–12).

Sundance has a public library, a branch of the Crook County Public Library system.

== Area attractions ==
Devils Tower National Monument, a 1,267-foot (386 m) high igneous rock intrusion or laccolith in the Bear Lodge Mountains, is a short drive north of Sundance via US-14 and Wyoming Highway 585. It rises dramatically above the surrounding terrain, with its summit 5,114 feet (1,559 m) above sea level. It was the first U.S. National Monument, established on September 24, 1906, by President Theodore Roosevelt. It receives about 400,000 visitors annually.

== Highways ==
- I-90
- I-90 BL - (via Cleveland St. through central Sundance business district)
- US 14
- WYO 585

== Media ==
Sundance is served by the Sundance Times newspaper, which reports on local news.

== See also ==
- Sundance Air Force Station
