= Moorcroft, Wyoming =

- Town
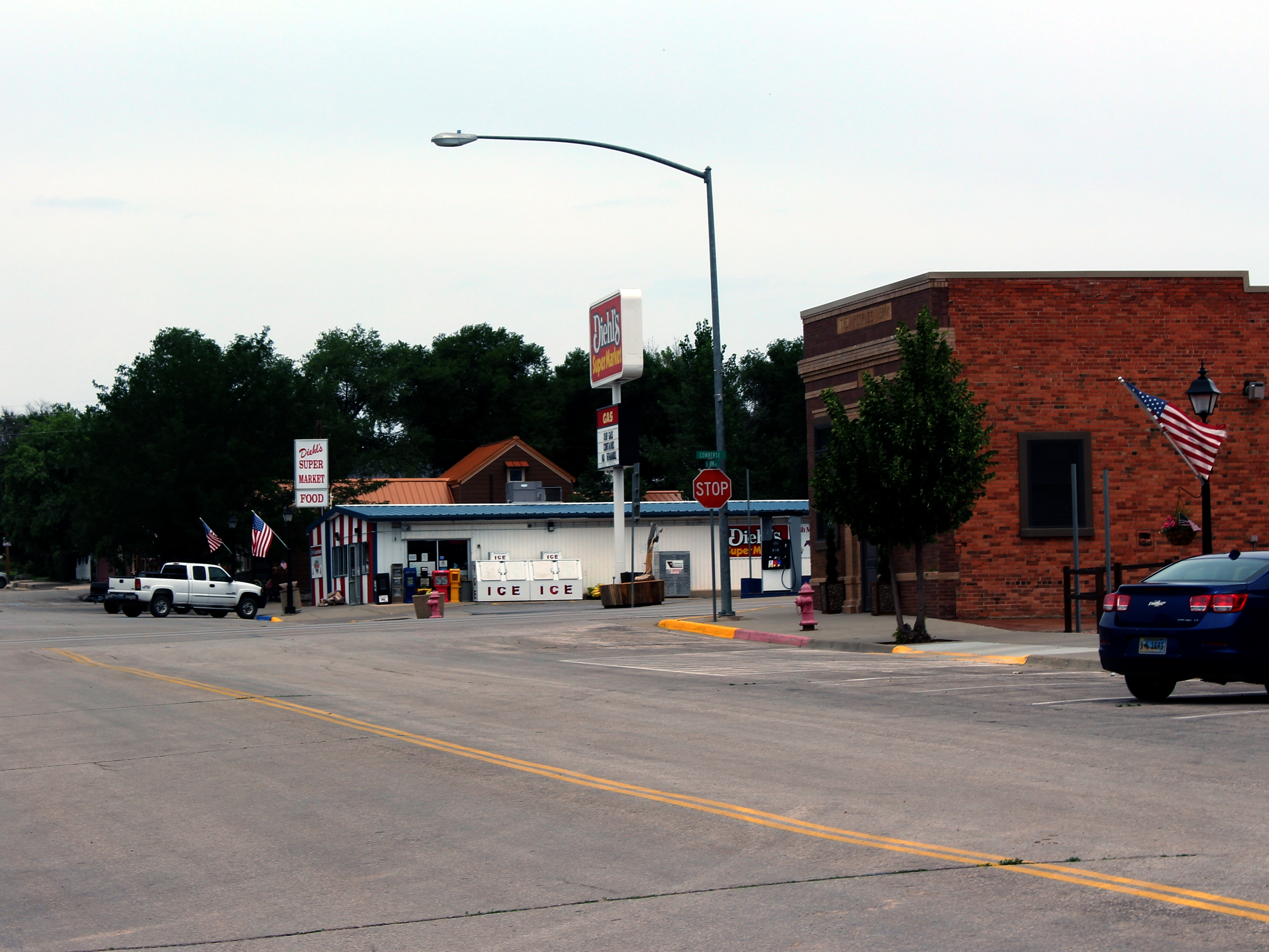
- Bighorn Avenue in Moorcroft

- Location of Moorcroft in Crook County, Wyoming
- Coordinates: 44°16′26″N 104°53′32″W
- Country: United States
- State: Wyoming
- County: Crook

Area
  - Total: 1.26 sq mi (3.27 km^{2})
  - Land: 1.26 sq mi (3.27 km^{2})
  - Water: 0 sq mi (0.00 km^{2})
- Elevation: 4,226 ft (1,288 m)

Population (2020)
  - Total: 946
  - Density: 858.2/sq mi (331.37/km^{2})
- Time zone: UTC-7 (Mountain (MST))
  - Summer (DST): UTC-6 (MDT)
- ZIP code: 82721
- Area code: 307
- FIPS code: 56-54185
- GNIS feature ID: 2413010
- Website: townofmoorcroft.com

Moorcroft is a town in Crook County, Wyoming, United States. The population was 946 at the 2020 census.

== History ==
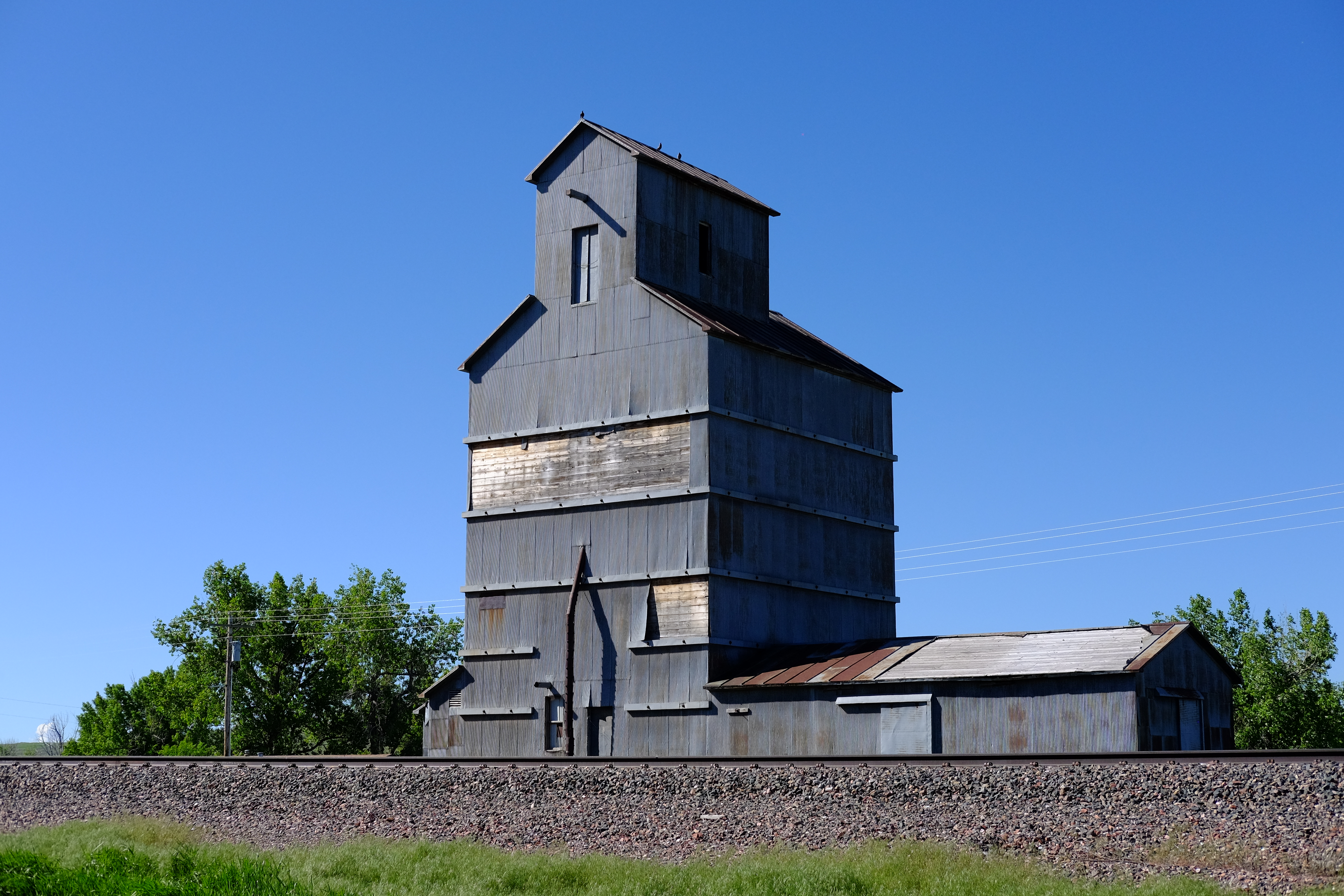
Grain elevator in Moorcroft

Old Peoples Bank of Moorcroft

Moorcroft was incorporated on October 2, 1906. The exact meaning of Moorcroft is unknown but over the years has several suggested origins for the name. The town was named in 1876 after Alexander Moorcroft, an early settler from Northern England who built a cabin in the Black Hills of Wyoming. The name Moorcroft was chosen by the community’s first postman Stocks Millar (1858-1890) after his home town in Scotland.

== Geography ==
According to the United States Census Bureau, the town has a total area of 1.26 square miles (3.26 km^{2}), all land.

=== Climate ===
Climate data for Moorcroft (4,230 feet above sea level)
| Month | Jan | Feb | Mar | Apr | May | Jun | Jul | Aug | Sep | Oct | Nov | Dec | Year |
|---|---|---|---|---|---|---|---|---|---|---|---|---|---|
| Record high °F (°C) | 66 (19) | 68 (20) | 78 (26) | 89 (32) | 94 (34) | 107 (42) | 108 (42) | 105 (41) | 101 (38) | 90 (32) | 77 (25) | 66 (19) | 108 (42) |
| Mean daily maximum °F (°C) | 32 (0) | 35 (2) | 45 (7) | 54 (12) | 64 (18) | 75 (24) | 86 (30) | 85 (29) | 73 (23) | 58 (14) | 43 (6) | 33 (1) | 57 (14) |
| Daily mean °F (°C) | 21.5 (−5.8) | 24.5 (−4.2) | 33.5 (0.8) | 41.5 (5.3) | 51 (11) | 61.5 (16.4) | 70.5 (21.4) | 69 (21) | 58 (14) | 44.5 (6.9) | 32 (0) | 21.5 (−5.8) | 44.1 (6.8) |
| Mean daily minimum °F (°C) | 11 (−12) | 14 (−10) | 22 (−6) | 29 (−2) | 38 (3) | 48 (9) | 55 (13) | 53 (12) | 43 (6) | 31 (−1) | 21 (−6) | 10 (−12) | 31 (0) |
| Record low °F (°C) | −37 (−38) | −43 (−42) | −26 (−32) | −4 (−20) | 4 (−16) | 23 (−5) | 29 (−2) | 28 (−2) | 17 (−8) | −17 (−27) | −26 (−32) | −46 (−43) | −46 (−43) |
| Average precipitation inches (mm) | 0.33 (8.4) | 0.36 (9.1) | 0.84 (21) | 1.42 (36) | 2.49 (63) | 2.06 (52) | 1.95 (50) | 1.53 (39) | 0.99 (25) | 1.30 (33) | 0.49 (12) | 0.31 (7.9) | 14.07 (356.4) |
Source: Weather Channel

== Demographics ==
Historical population
| Census | Pop. | Note | %± |
|---|---|---|---|
| 1910 | 178 | | — |
| 1920 | 420 | | 136.0% |
| 1930 | 341 | | −18.8% |
| 1940 | 387 | | 13.5% |
| 1950 | 517 | | 33.6% |
| 1960 | 826 | | 59.8% |
| 1970 | 981 | | 18.8% |
| 1980 | 1,014 | | 3.4% |
| 1990 | 768 | | −24.3% |
| 2000 | 807 | | 5.1% |
| 2010 | 1,009 | | 25.0% |
| 2020 | 946 | | −6.2% |
U.S. Decennial Census

=== 2010 census ===
As of the census of 2010, there were 1,009 people, 392 households, and 254 families residing in the town. The population density was 800.8 inhabitants per square mile (309.2/km^{2}). There were 442 housing units at an average density of 350.8 per square mile (135.4/km^{2}). The racial makeup of the town was 96.7% White, 0.9% Native American, 0.1% Asian, 1.0% from other races, and 1.3% from two or more races. Hispanic or Latino of any race were 4.5% of the population.

There were 392 households, of which 34.4% had children under the age of 18 living with them, 50.0% were married couples living together, 10.7% had a female householder with no husband present, 4.1% had a male householder with no wife present, and 35.2% were non-families. 27.6% of all households were made up of individuals, and 6.3% had someone living alone who was 65 years of age or older. The average household size was 2.57 and the average family size was 3.20.

The median age in the town was 32.6 years. 30.3% of residents were under the age of 18; 9.7% were between the ages of 18 and 24; 23.7% were from 25 to 44; 26.4% were from 45 to 64; and 9.7% were 65 years of age or older. The gender makeup of the town was 49.8% male and 50.2% female.

=== 2000 census ===
As of the census of 2000, there were 807 people, 325 households, and 219 families residing in the town. The population density was 731.4 people per square mile (283.3/km^{2}). There were 375 housing units at an average density of 339.9 per square mile (131.6/km^{2}). The racial makeup of the town was 98.1% White, 1.0% Native American, 0.3% from other races, and 0.6% from two or more races. Hispanic or Latino of any race were 1.4% of the population.

There were 325 households, out of which 34.5% had children under the age of 18 living with them, 56.0% were married couples living together, 7.7% had a female householder with no husband present, and 32.6% were non-families. 25.8% of all households were made up of individuals, and 9.8% had someone living alone who was 65 years of age or older. The average household size was 2.48 and the average family size was 3.04.

In the town, the population was spread out, with 27.3% under the age of 18, 11.3% from 18 to 24, 27.4% from 25 to 44, 24.3% from 45 to 64, and 9.8% who were 65 years of age or older. The median age was 36 years. For every 100 females, there were 99.8 males. For every 100 females age 18 and over, there were 99.7 males.

The median income for a household in the town was $36,953, and the median income for a family was $41,484. Males had a median income of $32,109 versus $19,632 for females. The per capita income for the town was $16,476. About 2.6% of families and 5.2% of the population were below the poverty line, including 4.5% of those under age 18 and 7.2% of those age 65 or over.

== Education ==
Public education in the town of Moorcroft is provided by Crook County School District #1. Zoned campuses include Moorcroft Elementary (grades pre-K-6) and Moorcroft Secondary School (grades 7-12).

Moorcroft has a public library, a branch of the Crook County Public Library System.

== Public Safety ==
=== Police ===
Moorcroft is served by the Moorcroft Police Department which is composed of three officers and one clerk.

== Notable people ==
- Irving W. Twiford (1898–1988), member of the Wyoming House of Representatives
- Chancey Williams (born 1981), country music singer, born in Moorcroft
