= Warren Peak (Wyoming) =

Mountain in the Bear Lodge Mountains of Wyoming

Coordinates: 44.4760°N 104.4440°W

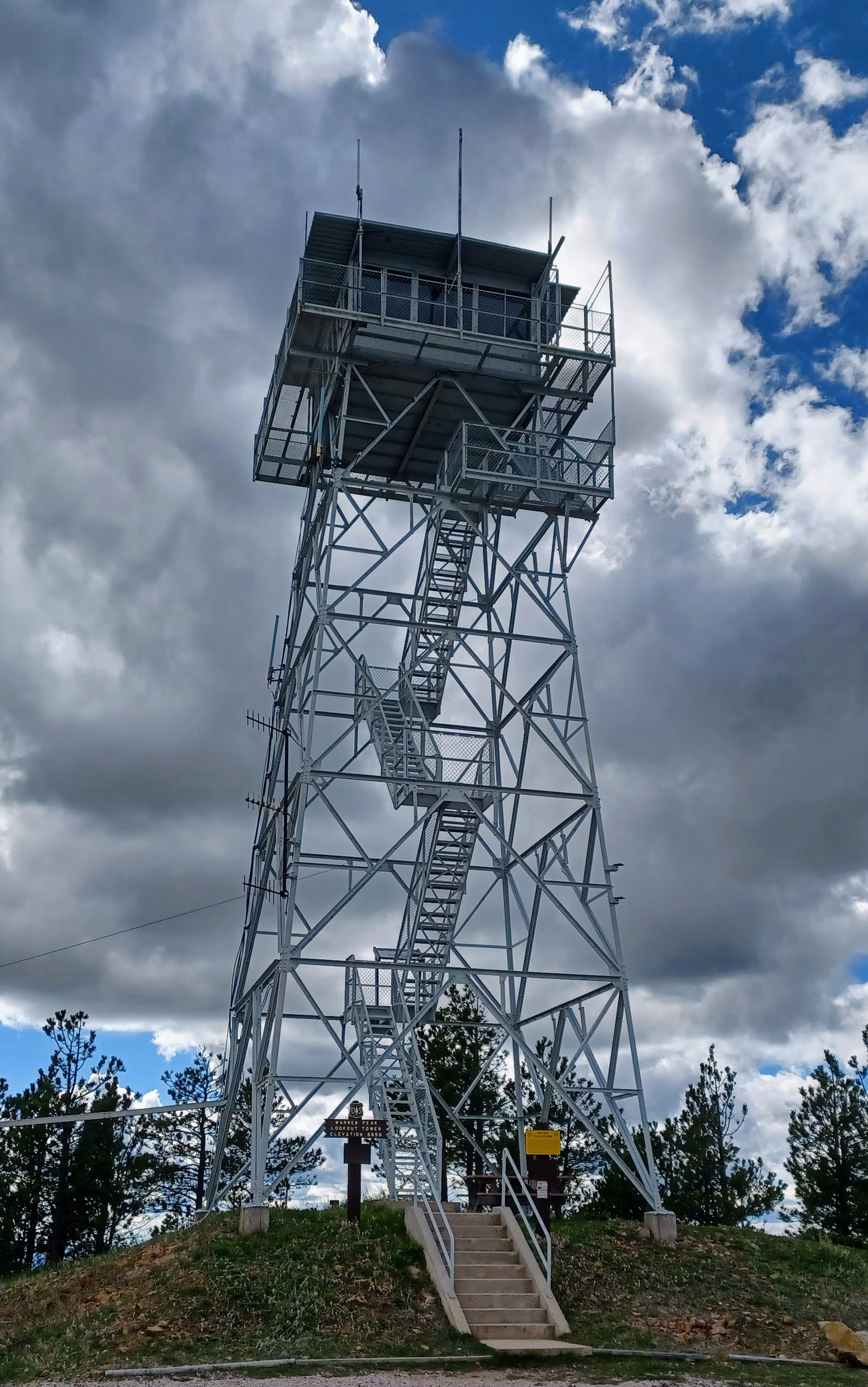
An image of Warren Peak Lookout Tower in the Bear Lodge Mountains within the Black Hills. The tower itself stands at 54 feet (16.46 meters) and was constructed in 1960 after demolishing the smaller original tower which stood at 10 feet (3.05 meters).

Warren Peak or Warren Peak Lookout (also known as Bear Lodge Mountain) is the most prominent mountain in the Bear Lodge Mountains and is located near Devils Tower which is at a lower elevation. Warren peak sits at an elevation of 6,640 feet above sea level and it is located in Crook County, Wyoming with the closest large town being Sundance, Wyoming. It is notable due to its Fire Lookout Tower which is one of many in the Black Hills region and Wyoming other ranges.

It is disputed if it is the highest point as Cement Ridge is stated to be 27 feet taller in elevation than Warren Peak, although this is debated as other sources say otherwise. It is located in the Bearlodge District within the Black Hills National Forest and was once a part of the Bear Lodge National Forest before being merged. Unlike other peaks in the area, it is easily accessible on an unnamed road due to its more gradual elevation (unlike Inyan Kara Mountain which rises much more steeply within the Bear Lodge Mountains).

== History ==
The original Warren Peak Lookout was constructed by the Civilian Conservation Corps of South Dakota in 1938, which carried out many projects within the Black Hills in respect of natural preservation. The original tower was 10 feet tall, with a live-in cab. The tower lasted until construction began on the nearby Sundance Air Force Station, the world's first nuclear-powered radar station in 1959. The station was built where the original 10 foot tower was before the tower was demolished. In 1960 and now without a lookout tower, a replacement 54-foot-tall tower was built, slightly east of the original location.

The Peak itself was named after Gouverneur K. Warren who led an expedition in the Black Hills, and famously led the last minute defense at Little Round Top during the Battle of Gettysburg. Although George Armstrong Custer made the more famous Black Hills Expedition and visited the Bear Lodge Mountains, he did not summit Warren Peak. He chose to summit Inyan Kara Mountain to the south, (likely due to its more impressive appearance), and carved an inscription of his name and the year on the peak's exposed rock. The Black Hills gold rush brought thousands of miners to the Black Hills and the Bear Lodge Mountains, as there was an abundance of rare earth minerals, especially gold, which jumpstarted many towns like Sundance.

== Terrain/Wildlife ==
=== Terrain ===
The lookout is in a sparsely forested area where the elevation gain is much more gradual than other peaks in the Black Hills, mostly since the peak is already in a high elevation area of the Bear Lodge Mountains. The region in general is much less rocky than the core Black Hills which is one of the main differences that make it a subrange. Although some peaks still have exposed rock such as Inyan Kara Mountain in southern the Bear Lodge Mountains, and Sundance Mountain which is south of Warren peak and has notable cliffs and hikes.

=== Wildlife ===
The wildlife on the peak is mostly shared with the surrounding range although you are more likely to encounter a Mountain lion (Cougar) or a Bobcat in higher elevation areas like Warren Peak than the lower areas of the Bear Lodge Mountains. There are occasionally lots of flowers on unforested hills which make hiking a recreational activity as nearby Devils Tower nearby attracts tourists. The ranges cold snaps and moderate snowfall in winter makes it difficult for some animals to survive that are found in the core Black Hills, which offer more dense vegetation in Spearfish Canyon.
