= Catalina mountain snail =

Conservation status
- Critically Endangered (IUCN 2.3)

- Critically Imperiled (NatureServe)

Scientific classification
- Kingdom: Animalia
- Phylum: Mollusca
- Class: Gastropoda
- Order: Stylommatophora
- Family: Oreohelicidae
- Genus: Radiocentrum
- Species: R. avalonense

Binomial name
- Radiocentrum avalonense (Hemphill, 1905)

Synonyms
- Oreohelix (Radiocentrum) avalonense Hemphill, 1905

Species of gastropod

The Catalina mountain snail (Radiocentrum avalonense) is a species of small air-breathing land snail, a terrestrial pulmonate gastropod mollusk in the family Oreohelicidae. This species is critically endangered and endemic to the United States, found only on Santa Catalina Island in the Channel Islands of Southern California.

== Taxonomy ==
In The Nautilus, malacologist S. Stillman Berry describes the species’ occurrence on Santa Catalina Island as one of the more puzzling biogeographic anomalies among western North American land snails. No other Oreohelix species is confirmed to have settled anywhere else in California, and the subgenus Radocentrum is usually found in the Chiricahua and Big Hatchet Mountains of southeastern Arizona and southwestern New Mexico.

== Distribution ==
The species is endemic only to Santa Catalina Island in Los Angeles County. It currently has a global rarity ranking of G1(Critically Imperiled).

== Conservation status ==
In 1994, the Catalina mountain snail was first assessed for the IUCN Red List in 1994 as Vulnerable and was later upgraded to Critically Endangered in a 1996 assessment by B. Roth. The species has not been reassessed since 1996, and thus currently holds the status of “Needs Updating” on status.
