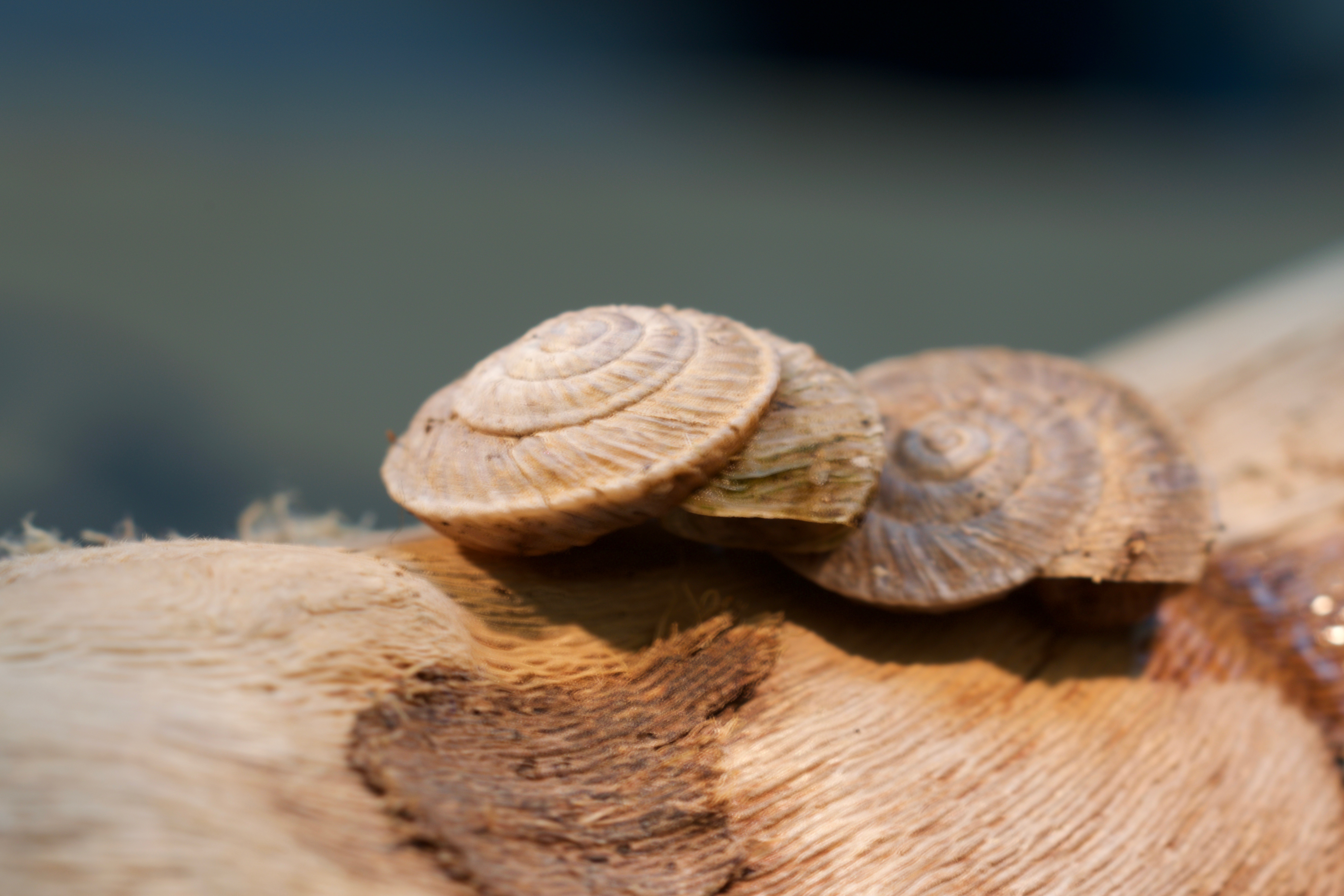

Conservation status
- Critically Imperiled (NatureServe)

Scientific classification
- Kingdom: Animalia
- Phylum: Mollusca
- Class: Gastropoda
- Order: Stylommatophora
- Family: Oreohelicidae
- Genus: Oreohelix
- Species: O. hammeri

Binomial name
- Oreohelix hammeri (Fairbanks, 1984)

= Oreohelix hammeri =

Species of gastropod

Oreohelix hammeri, the Seven Devils mountain snail, is a species of air-breathing land snail, a terrestrial pulmonate gastropod mollusk in the family Oreohelicidae. This species is endemic to the United States.
