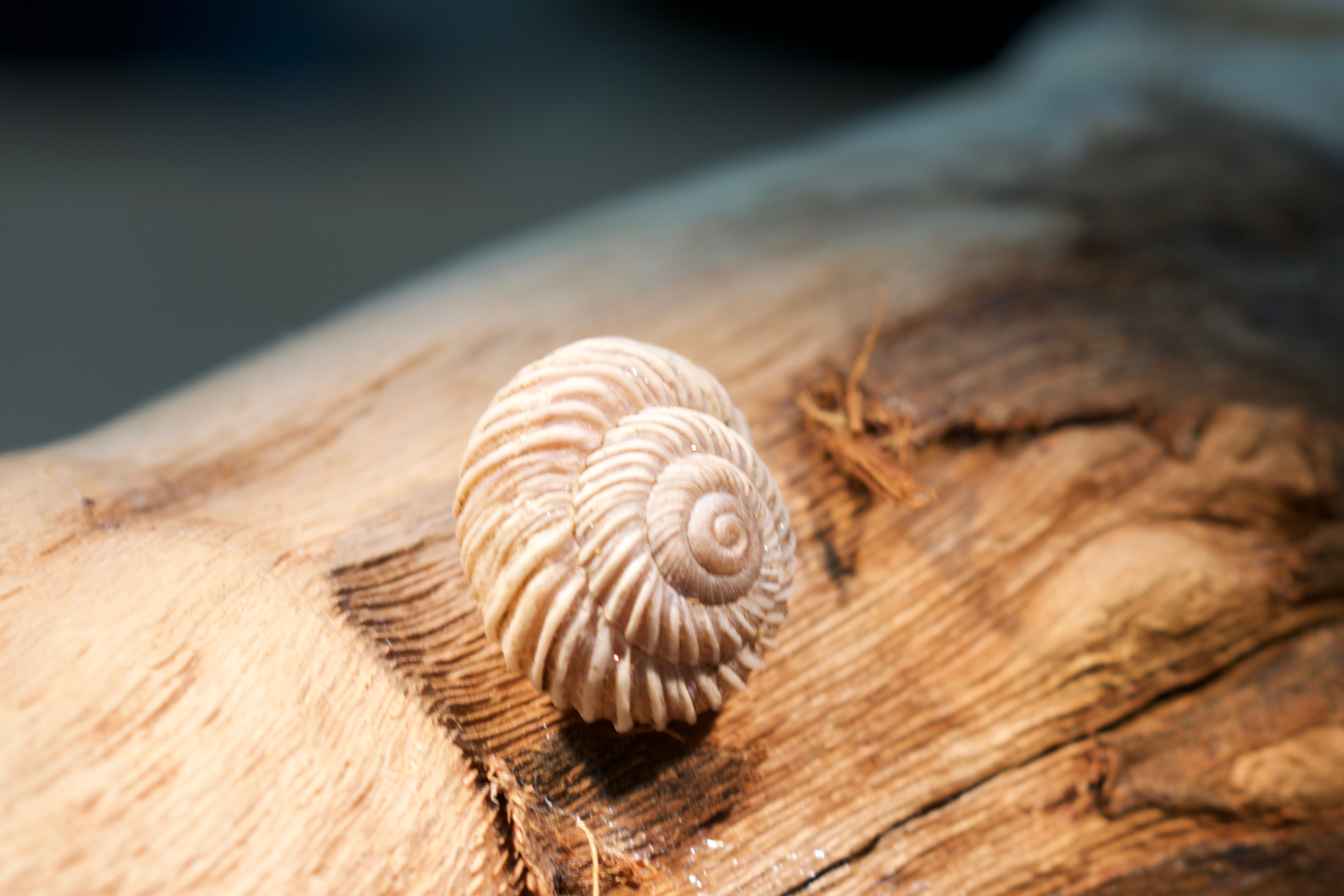

Conservation status
- Critically Imperiled (NatureServe)

Scientific classification
- Kingdom: Animalia
- Phylum: Mollusca
- Class: Gastropoda
- Order: Stylommatophora
- Family: Oreohelicidae
- Genus: Oreohelix
- Species: O. idahoensis

Binomial name
- Oreohelix idahoensis (Hemphill, 1890)

= Oreohelix idahoensis =

Species of gastropod

Oreohelix idahoensis, the costate mountain snail, is a species of air-breathing land snail, a terrestrial pulmonate gastropod mollusk in the family Oreohelicidae. This species is endemic to the United States.
