= Oreohelix carinifera =

Conservation status
- Critically Imperiled (NatureServe)

Scientific classification
- Kingdom: Animalia
- Phylum: Mollusca
- Class: Gastropoda
- Order: Stylommatophora
- Family: Oreohelicidae
- Genus: Oreohelix
- Species: O. carinifera

Binomial name
- Oreohelix carinifera Pilsbry, 1912

Species of gastropod

Oreohelix carinifera, common name keeled mountainsnail, is a species of air-breathing land snail, a terrestrial pulmonate gastropod mollusk in the family Oreohelicidae.

== Original description ==
Oreohelix carinifera was originally described by Henry Augustus Pilsbry in 1912. The type locality is Garrison, Montana, USA.

Pilsbry's original text (the type description) reads as follows:

OREOHELIX CARINIFERA, n. sp.

The shell is lenticular, carinate, umbilicate, the width of umbilicus between a fourth and a fifth that of the shell, whorls 4½, slowly increasing, the first 2½ strongly convex, obliquely striate, the striae finer on the embryonic portion. Subsequent whorls are strongly convex around the upper (inner) part, becoming concave near the outer edge; the striation is rougher, and some weak traces of spiral striae appear in places. The last whorl is noticeably concave above and below the peripheral keel; it descends very slightly or not at all in front, and on the base there are very inconspicuous, well spaced spirals composed of granules. The oblique alt. and the diameter of the aperture are equal, and there is a slight angle at the termination of the keel.

Alt. 5, diam. 9.4 mm.; width of umbilicus 2 mm.; oblique alt. and diam. of aperture 4 mm.

Garrison, Montana. Type and paratypes No. 99253 A. N. S. P.

Oreohelix alpina Elrod, which comes from high elevations (8,500 9,000 ft.) in the Mission Mountains, is about the size of this snail, but the whorls are less convex, the convexity of the later ones is simple, while in carinifera there is a concavity above the periphery. O. alpina has no spiral sculpture or granulation, and the keel is less pronounced. I regard such similarity as exists as due to convergence rather than to actual relationship. 0. hemphilli Nc. differs in the sculpture and shape of the embryonic whorls.

O. carinifera is one of the smallest Oreohelices, the dimensions given above being those of the largest shell out of about 20 in the two lots seen. A very similar small form was taken with O. haydeni in the Wasatch Mountains many years ago by the Wheeler Expedition, but I think it will prove to be distinct. Its exact location in

that range is not known, and it was not among the forms taken by Hemphill there.

== Distribution ==
This species occurs in Montana, USA.
