= Gouverneur K. Warren =

General in the U.S. Army during the American Civil War

Gouverneur Kemble Warren
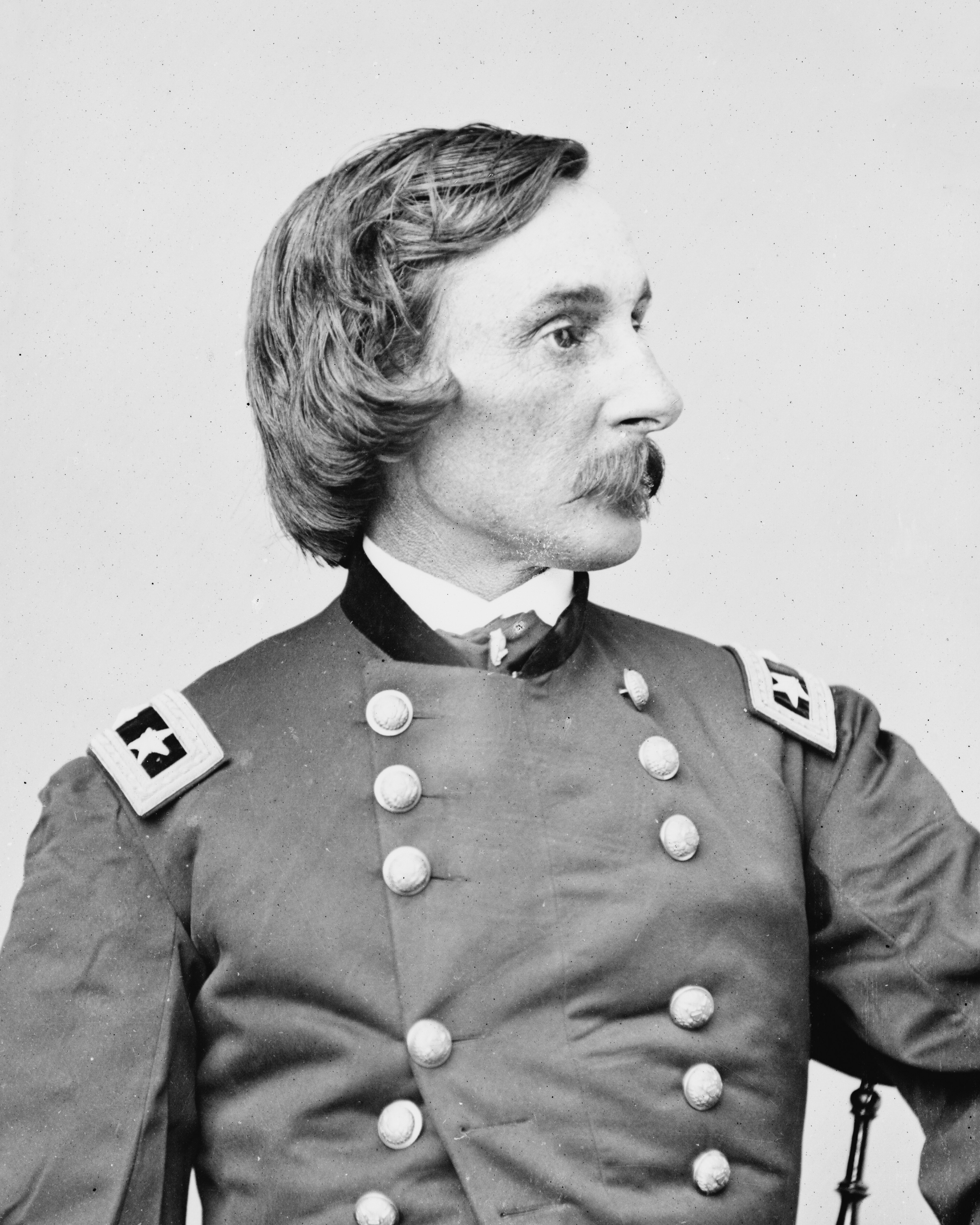
- Born: January 8, 1830; Cold Spring, New York, U.S.
- Died: August 8, 1882 (aged 52); Newport, Rhode Island, U.S.
- Burial place: Island Cemetery, Newport, Rhode Island
- Military career
- Allegiance: United States
- Branch: United States Army; Union Army
- Service years: 1850–1882
- Rank: Major general
- Nickname: Hero of Little Round Top
- Commands: 5th New York Volunteer Infantry; II Corps; V Corps
- Conflicts: First Sioux War; Battle of Ash Hollow; American Civil War; Battle of Big Bethel; Peninsula campaign; Battle of Fredericksburg; Battle of Chancellorsville; Battle of Gettysburg; Battle of Bristoe Station; Overland Campaign; Battle of the Wilderness; Siege of Petersburg; Appomattox campaign; Battle of Five Forks

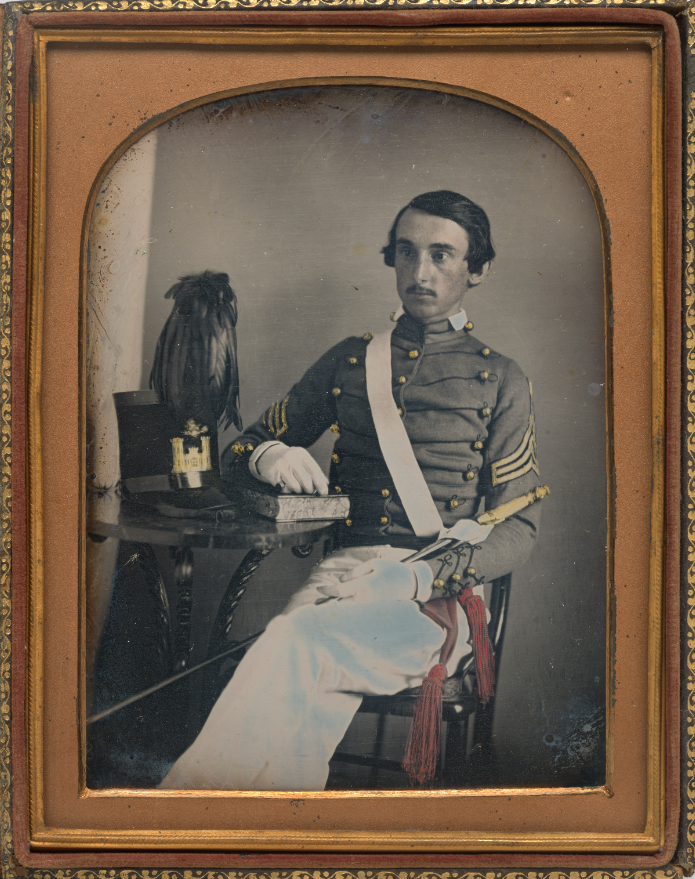
Gouverneur K. Warren as a West Point cadet, c.1850

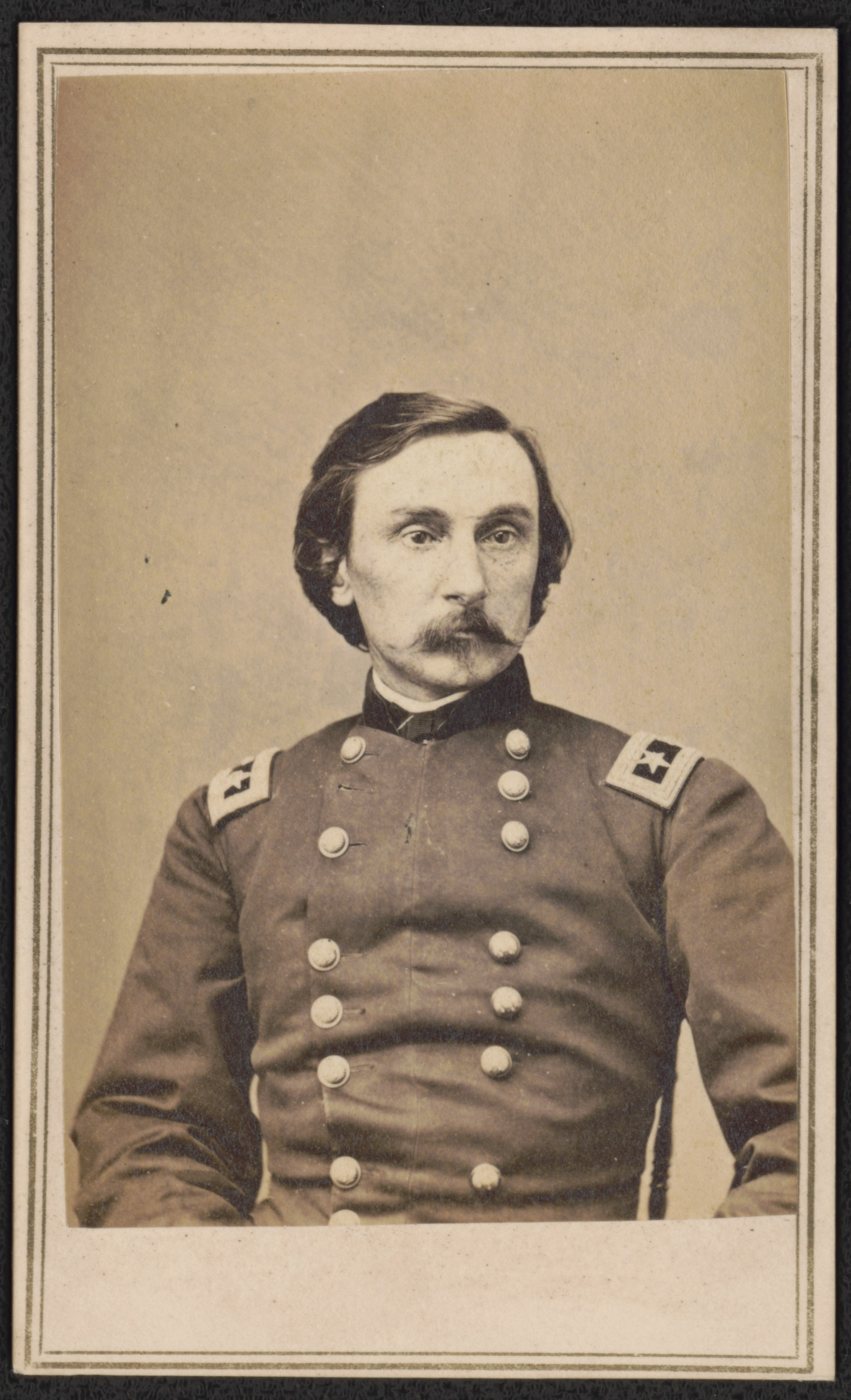
Major General Gouverneur Kemble Warren. From the Liljenquist Family Collection of Civil War Photographs, Prints and Photographs Division, Library of Congress

Gouverneur Kemble Warren (January 8, 1830 – August 8, 1882) was an American civil engineer and United States Army general during the American Civil War. He is best remembered for arranging the last-minute defense of Little Round Top during the Battle of Gettysburg and is often referred to as the "Hero of Little Round Top". His subsequent service as a corps commander and his remaining military career were ruined during the Battle of Five Forks, when he was relieved of command of the V Corps by Philip Sheridan, who claimed that Warren had moved too slowly. A post-war court of inquiry found that Sheridan's relief of Warren was unjustified.

== Early life ==
Warren was born in Cold Spring, New York, and named for Gouverneur Kemble, a prominent local Congressman, diplomat, industrialist, and owner of the West Point Foundry. His sister, Emily Warren Roebling, would later play a significant role in building the Brooklyn Bridge. He entered the United States Military Academy across the Hudson River from his hometown at age 16 and graduated second in his class of 44 cadets in 1850. He was commissioned a brevet second lieutenant in the Corps of Topographical Engineers.

In the Antebellum South, he worked on the Mississippi River, participating in the Pacific Railroad Surveys of possible transcontinental railroad routes, and, in 1857, mapping the Western United States, extensively exploring the vast Nebraska Territory, including Nebraska, North Dakota, South Dakota, part of Montana, and part of Wyoming. He served as the engineer on William S. Harney's Battle of Ash Hollow in the Nebraska Territory in 1855, where he saw his first combat.

One region he surveyed was the Minnesota River Valley, a valley much larger than expected from the low-flow Minnesota River. In some places, the valley is 5 miles (8 km) wide and 250 feet (80 m) deep. Warren first explained the region's hydrology in 1868, attributing the gorge to a massive river that drained Lake Agassiz between 11,700 and 9,400 years ago. The great river was named Glacial River Warren in his honor after his death.

== American Civil War ==
At the start of the war, Warren was a first lieutenant and mathematics instructor at the United States Military Academy. He helped raise a local regiment for service in the U.S. Army and was appointed lieutenant colonel of the 5th New York Infantry Regiment on May 14, 1861. Warren and his regiment saw their first combat at the Battle of Big Bethel in Virginia on June 10, arguably the first major land engagement of the war. He was promoted to colonel and regimental commander on September 10.

In the 1862 Peninsula Campaign, Warren commanded his regiment at the Siege of Yorktown and also assisted the chief topographical engineer of the Army of the Potomac, Brig. Gen. Andrew A. Humphreys, by leading reconnaissance missions and drawing detailed maps of appropriate routes for the army in its advance up the Virginia Peninsula. He commanded a small brigade (3rd Brigade, 2nd Division, V Corps) during the Seven Days Battles consisting of his own 5th New York along with the 10th New York. At Gaines Mill, he was bruised in the knee by a shell fragment but remained on the field. He continued to lead the brigade at the Second Battle of Bull Run, suffering heavy casualties in a heroic stand against an overwhelming enemy assault, and at Antietam, where the V Corps was in reserve and saw no combat.

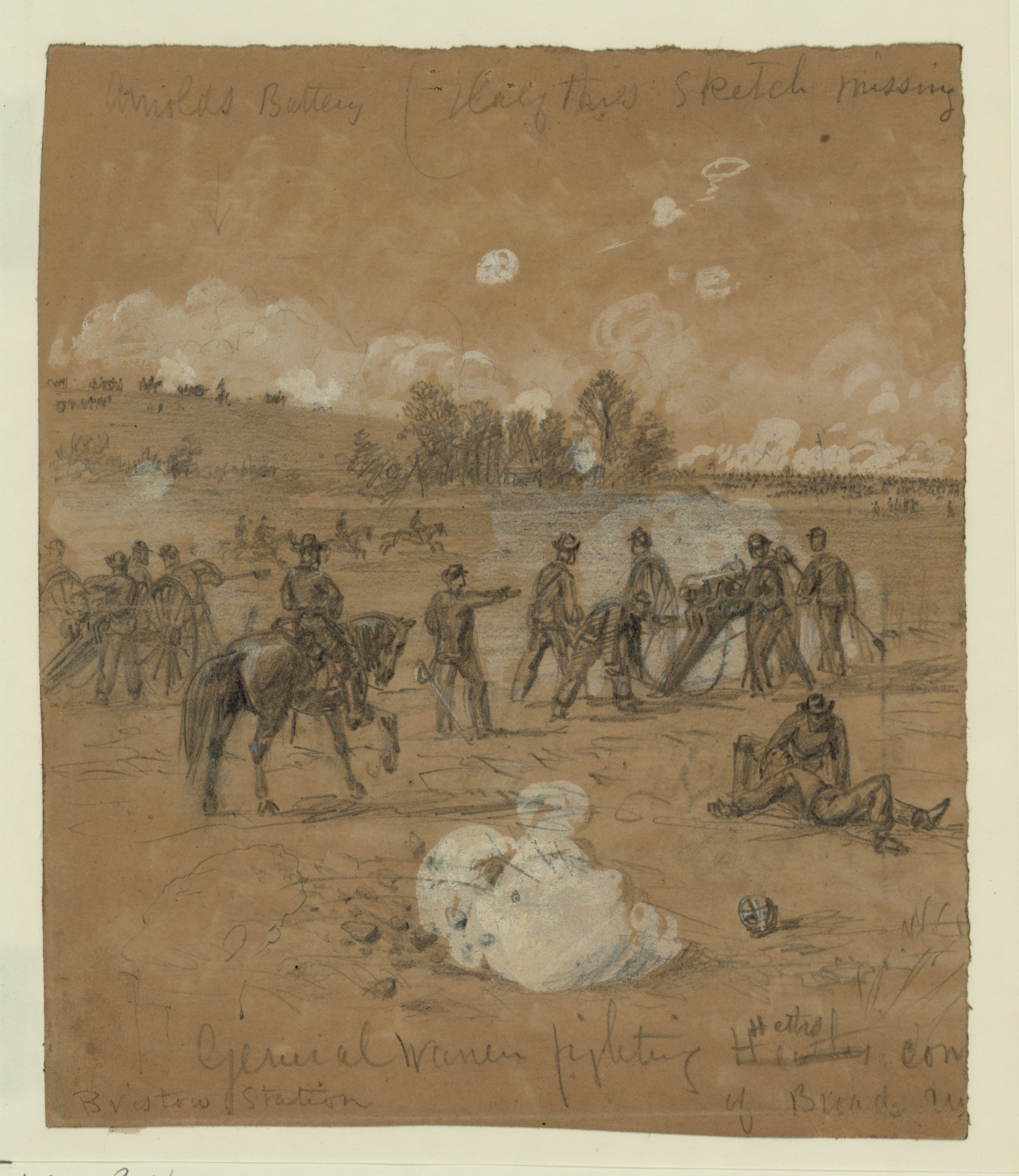
General Warren fighting at Bristoe station as sketched by Alfred Waud

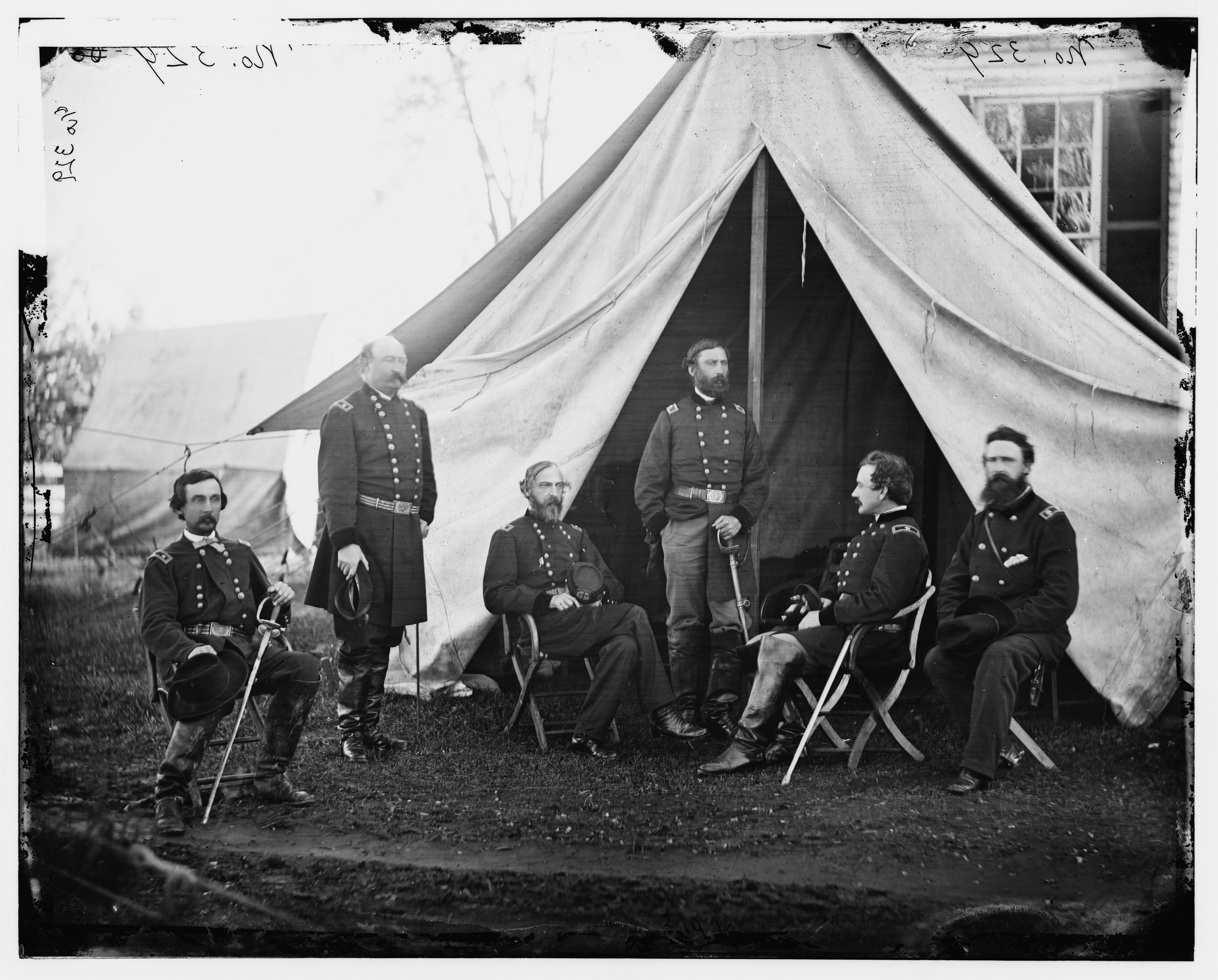
Commanders of the Army of the Potomac, Gouverneur K. Warren, William H. French, George G. Meade, Henry J. Hunt, Andrew A. Humphreys and George Sykes in September 1863

Warren was promoted to brigadier general on September 26, 1862, and he and his brigade went to the Battle of Fredericksburg in December, but again were held in reserve and saw no action. When U.S. Maj. Gen. Joseph Hooker reorganized the Army of the Potomac in February 1863, he named Warren his chief topographical engineer and then chief engineer. As chief engineer, Warren was commended for his service in the Battle of Chancellorsville.

At the start of the Gettysburg campaign, as Confederate General Robert E. Lee began his invasion of Pennsylvania, Warren advised Hooker on the routes the Army should take in pursuit. On the second day of the Battle of Gettysburg, July 2, 1863, Warren initiated the defense of Little Round Top, recognizing the importance of the undefended position on the left flank of the U.S. Army and directing, on his initiative, the brigade of Col. Strong Vincent to occupy it just minutes before it was attacked. Warren suffered a minor neck wound during the Confederate assault.

Promoted to major general after Gettysburg (August 8, 1863), Warren commanded the II Corps from August 1863 until March 1864, replacing the wounded Maj. Gen. Winfield S. Hancock, and distinguishing himself at the Battle of Bristoe Station. On March 13, 1865, he was brevetted to major general in the regular army for his actions at Bristoe Station. During the Mine Run Campaign, Warren's corps was ordered to attack Lee's army. Still, he perceived that a trap had been laid and refused the order from army commander Maj. Gen. George G. Meade. Although initially angry at Warren, Meade acknowledged that he had been right. Upon Hancock's return from medical leave and the spring 1864 reorganization of the Army of the Potomac, Warren assumed command of the V Corps and led it through the Overland Campaign, the Siege of Petersburg, and the Appomattox Campaign.

During these Virginia campaigns, Warren established a reputation for bringing his engineering traits of deliberation and caution to the role of an infantry corps commander. He won the Battle of Globe Tavern, August 18 to August 20, 1864, cutting the Weldon Railroad, a vital supply route north to Petersburg. He also won a limited success in the Battle of Peebles' Farm in September 1864, carrying a part of the Confederate lines protecting supplies moving to Petersburg on the Boydton Plank Road.

The aggressive Maj. Gen. Philip Sheridan, a key subordinate of Lt. Gen. Ulysses S. Grant, was dissatisfied with Warren's performance. He was angry at Warren's corps for supposedly obstructing roads after the Battle of the Wilderness and its cautious actions during the Siege of Petersburg. At the beginning of the Appomattox Campaign, Sheridan requested that the VI Corps be assigned to his pursuit of Lee's army. Still, Grant insisted that the V Corps was better positioned. He gave Sheridan written permission to relieve Warren if he felt it was justified "for the good of the service". Grant later wrote in his Personal Memoirs,

I was so much dissatisfied with Warren's dilatory movements in the battle of White Oak Road and in his failure to reach Sheridan in time, that I was very much afraid that at the last moment he would fail Sheridan. He was a man of fine intelligence, great earnestness, quick perception, and could make his dispositions as quickly as any officer, under difficulties where he was forced to act. But I had before discovered a defect which was beyond his control, that was very prejudicial to his usefulness in emergencies like the one just before us. He could see every danger at a glance before he had encountered it. He would not only make preparations to meet the danger which might occur, but he would inform his commanding officer what others should do while he was executing his move.

— Ulysses S. Grant, Personal Memoirs

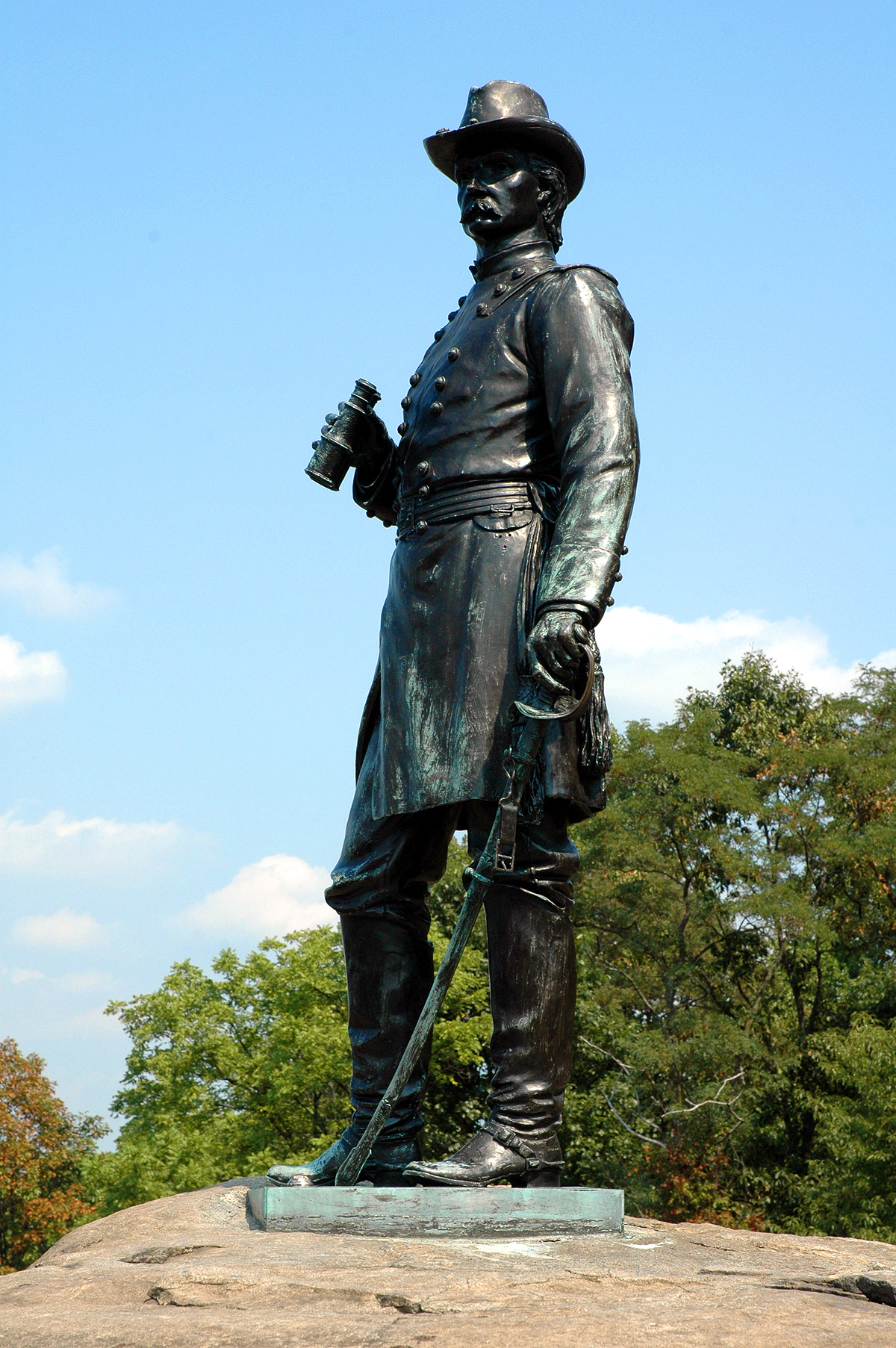
Gerhardt's statue of Warren on Little Round Top in Gettysburg

At the Battle of Five Forks on April 1, 1865, Sheridan judged that the V Corps had moved too slowly into the attack and criticized Warren fiercely for not being at the front of his columns. Warren had been held up, searching for Samuel W. Crawford's division, which had gone astray in the woods. But overall, he had handled his corps efficiently, and their attack had carried the day at Five Forks, arguably the pivotal battle of the final days. He even led the final charge, which broke the Confederate lines. Nevertheless, Sheridan relieved Warren of command on the spot. Warren asked Sheridan for reconsideration, who retorted, "Reconsider? Hell, I'll never reconsider. Obey the order!" Meade told Warren that he had contemplated his relief for some time, but he relented and later recommended Grant reinstate him as the V Corps commander to ease tensions in the Army. He was assigned to the defenses of Petersburg and then briefly to command of the Department of Mississippi.

== Post-war ==
Humiliated by Sheridan, Warren resigned his commission as major general of volunteers due to his disagreement with suppressing the meeting of the Mississippi legislature "by any means necessary" on May 27, 1865. He reverted to his permanent rank as major in the United States Army Corps of Engineers. He served as an engineer for 17 years, building railroads with assignments along the Mississippi River, achieving the rank of lieutenant colonel in 1879. By all accounts, Warren worked with intensity at great sacrifice to himself and his family. But the career that had shown so much promise at Gettysburg was ruined. He urgently requested a court of inquiry to exonerate him from the stigma of Sheridan's action. Numerous requests were ignored or refused until Ulysses S. Grant retired from the presidency. President Rutherford B. Hayes ordered a court of inquiry that convened in 1879. After hearing testimony from dozens of witnesses over 100 days, including Grant and Sheridan, the court found that Sheridan's relief of Warren had been unjustified. General Winfield Hancock, his former fellow corps commander during the Overland Campaign, initially presided over the court of inquiry held on Governor's Island, New York. Sheridan's accounts did not hold up to facts established by others, reflected ignorance of Warren's movements at Five Forks, and were perceived as reflective of personal animosity. Joshua Chamberlain, the hero of the Little Round Top and former governor of Maine, who commanded a Brigade in Warren's corps, gave strong testimony to support Warren. During his testimony, Grant commented that he never doubted Warren's courage and tactical skill but wanted his orders followed "promptly" and did not want second-guessing that assumed senior leadership had not considered the options, strongly implying such insubordination led to Warren's relief. His statement was stricken from the record at Grant's request, simultaneously with the objection of Warren's counsel. On November 21, 1881, President Chester Alan Arthur directed that the findings be published; no other action was taken. Unfortunately for Warren, these results were not published until after his death.

In 1867, he was elected as a member of the American Philosophical Society.

Warren's last assignment in the Army was as district engineer for Newport, Rhode Island, where he died of complications from diabetes on August 8, 1882. He was buried in the Island Cemetery in Newport in civilian clothes and without military honors at his request. His last words were, "The flag! The flag!"

== Legacy ==
A bronze statue of Warren stands on Little Round Top in Gettysburg National Military Park. It was created by Karl Gerhardt (1853–1940) and dedicated in 1888. Another bronze statue, by Henry Baerer (1837–1908), was erected in the Grand Army Plaza, Brooklyn, New York. It depicts Warren standing in uniform, with field binoculars on a granite pedestal made of stone quarried at Little Round Top.

Reflecting a pattern of naming many Washington, DC streets in newly developed areas in the Capital after Civil War generals, an east–west street in the Northwest quadrant is named Warren Street, NW.

The United States Army Transport Warren was named for Warren.

The glacial river that was the outlet of Lake Agassiz in Minnesota was named for Warren.

The G. K. Warren Prize is awarded approximately every four years by the United States National Academy of Sciences. It is funded by a gift from his daughter, Miss Emily B. Warren, in memory of her father.

Mount Warren in California is named in his honor.

Warren Peak in the Bear Lodge Mountains of Wyoming is named in his honor.

== See also ==
- List of American Civil War generals (Union)

== Notes ==
Military offices
Preceded by William Hays	Commander of the Second Army Corps; August 16, 1863 – August 26, 1863	Succeeded by John C. Caldwell
Preceded by John C. Caldwell	Commander of the Second Army Corps; September 2, 1863 – October 10, 1863	Succeeded by John C. Caldwell
Preceded by John C. Caldwell	Commander of the Second Army Corps; October 12, 1863 – December 16, 1863	Succeeded by John C. Caldwell
Preceded by John C. Caldwell	Commander of the Second Army Corps; December 29, 1863 – January 9, 1864	Succeeded by John C. Caldwell
Preceded by John C. Caldwell	Commander of the Second Army Corps; January 15, 1864 – March 24, 1864	Succeeded by Winfield S. Hancock
Preceded by George Sykes	Commander of the Fifth Army Corps; March 23, 1864 – January 2, 1865	Succeeded by Samuel W. Crawford
Preceded by Samuel W. Crawford	Commander of the Fifth Army Corps; January 27, 1865 – April 1, 1865	Succeeded by Charles Griffin
