= Lava rock mountain snail =

Conservation status
- Vulnerable (IUCN 2.3)

- Critically Imperiled (NatureServe)

Scientific classification
- Kingdom: Animalia
- Phylum: Mollusca
- Class: Gastropoda
- Order: Stylommatophora
- Family: Oreohelicidae
- Genus: Oreohelix
- Species: O. waltoni

Binomial name
- Oreohelix waltoni Solem, 1975

Species of gastropod

The lava rock mountain snail (Oreohelix waltoni) is a species of land snail in the family Oreohelicidae. It is also known as Walton's banded mountain snail. It is endemic to Idaho in the United States, where it is known from just a few locations on the Salmon River.
