= Boulder pile mountain snail =

Conservation status
- Vulnerable (IUCN 2.3)

- Critically Imperiled (NatureServe)

Scientific classification
- Kingdom: Animalia
- Phylum: Mollusca
- Class: Gastropoda
- Order: Stylommatophora
- Family: Oreohelicidae
- Genus: Oreohelix
- Species: O. jugalis

Binomial name
- Oreohelix jugalis (Hemphill, 1890)

Species of gastropod

The boulder pile mountain snail, scientific name Oreohelix jugalis is a species of air-breathing land snail, a terrestrial pulmonate gastropod mollusk in the family Oreohelicidae. This species is endemic to the United States.
