= Bear Lodge Mountains =

Mountain range in Wyoming, United States

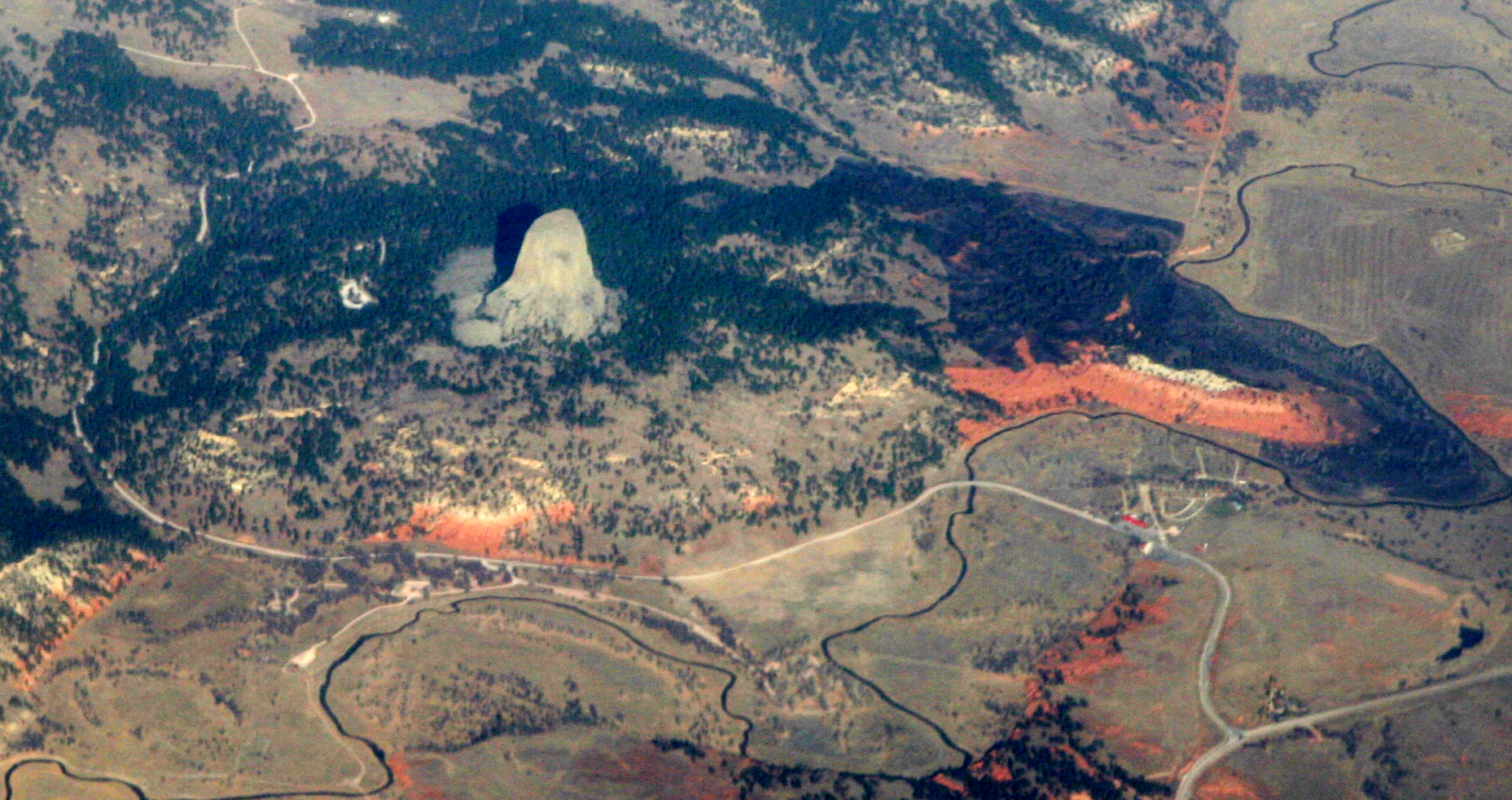
- Devils Tower National Monument, a popular attraction in the Bear Lodge Mountains

Highest point
- Peak: Bear Lodge Mountain, also known as Warren Peak
- Elevation: 2,024 m (6,640 ft)at the Bear Lodge Mountain Lookout Tower, also known as Warren Peak Lookout
- Coordinates: 44°28′33″N 104°26′38″W

Geography
- Location within Wyoming
- Country: United States
- State: Wyoming

The Bear Lodge Mountains (Lakota: Mato Tipila) are a small obscure mountain range in Crook County, Wyoming. These mountains are protected in the Black Hills National Forest as part of its Bearlodge District. Devils Tower National Monument was the first U.S. National Monument and draws about 500,000 visitors per year to the area. The Bear Lodge Mountains are one of three mountain ranges which compose the Black Hills region and national forest, including the Black Hills itself and South Dakota's Elk Mountains which are a southwestern extension of the core Black Hills.

Sundance, Wyoming, is the closest major city and lies south of the Bear Lodge Mountains.

== History ==
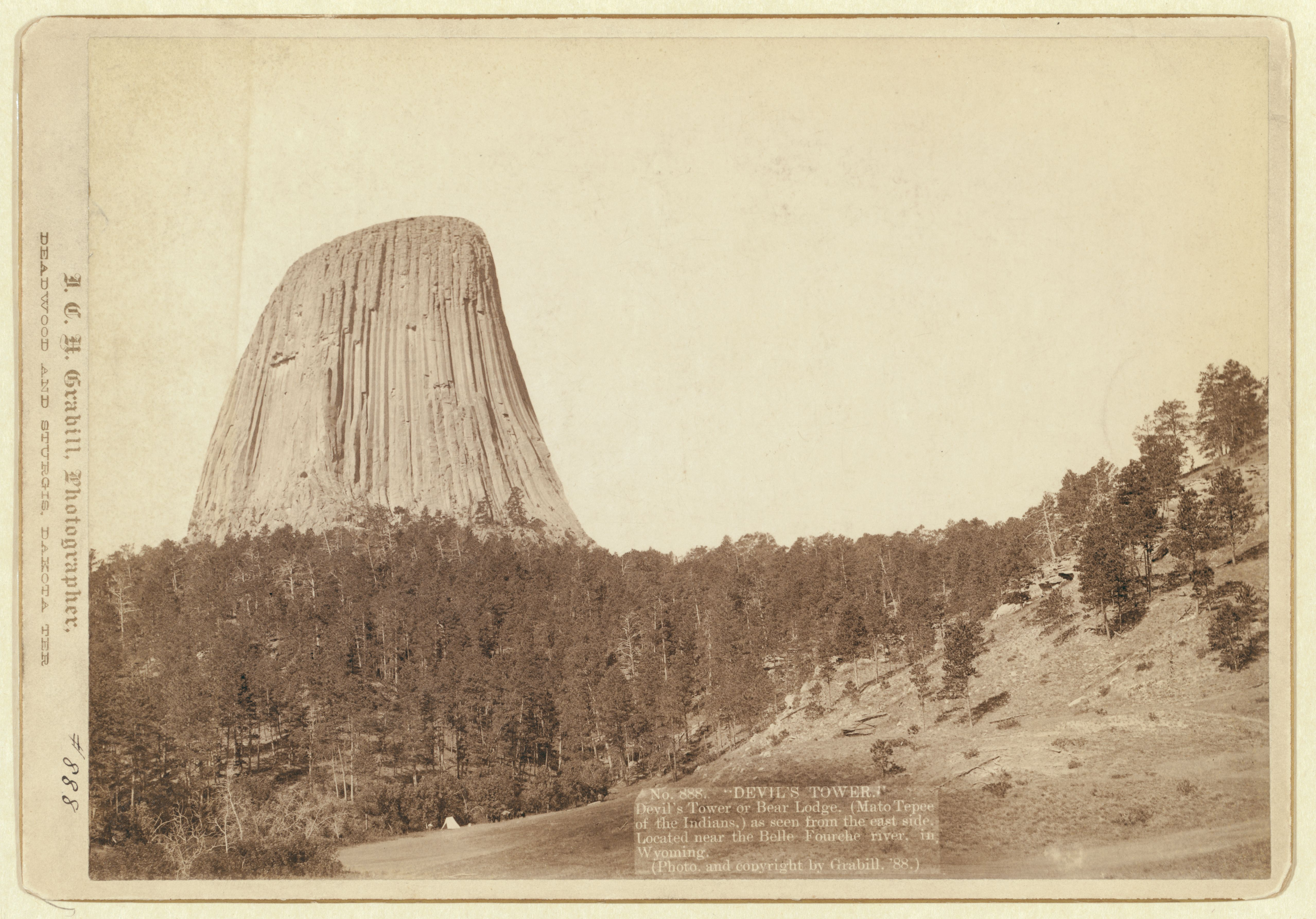
Devils Tower, 1888

The place names Bear Lodge, Sun Dance, and Rock Gatherer (Inyan Kara) come from the history of Lakota people in this area. Devils Tower was declared a United States National Monument in 1906. From 1907 to 1908, the area was the Bear Lodge National Forest, then the Sundance National Forest through 1915, before becoming a district of the Black Hills National Forest.

== Geography/Terrain ==
The Bear Lodge Mountains were formed as a byproduct of the geological processes that created the Black Hills, and offer hikes throughout bottomlands, hills, and buttes. Unlike the Black Hills, this range is small and only a few igneous rocks are exposed. Just outside the range, however, lie the very large igneous intrusions of Devils Tower, Inyan Kara Mountain, and Sundance Mountain. Devils Tower is the most unique part of the range as it stands alone rising 1267 feet from nearby Belle Fourche Valley and 867 feet from the immediate base.

Bounded on the north by the Belle Fourche River, the mountains have several Belle Fourche River tributaries including Redwater, Blacktail, Miller, Beaver, Lytle, Lame Jones, and Hay Creeks. There were coal mines in these river valleys which were first prospected in 1875 after the discovery of gold in feldspar porphyry near Warren Peak. The exact boundaries of the range are uncertain mainly due to the obscurity of the range even to locals who refer to the area as the Black Hills but for certain the high elevation areas and Devils Tower are definitively in the range.

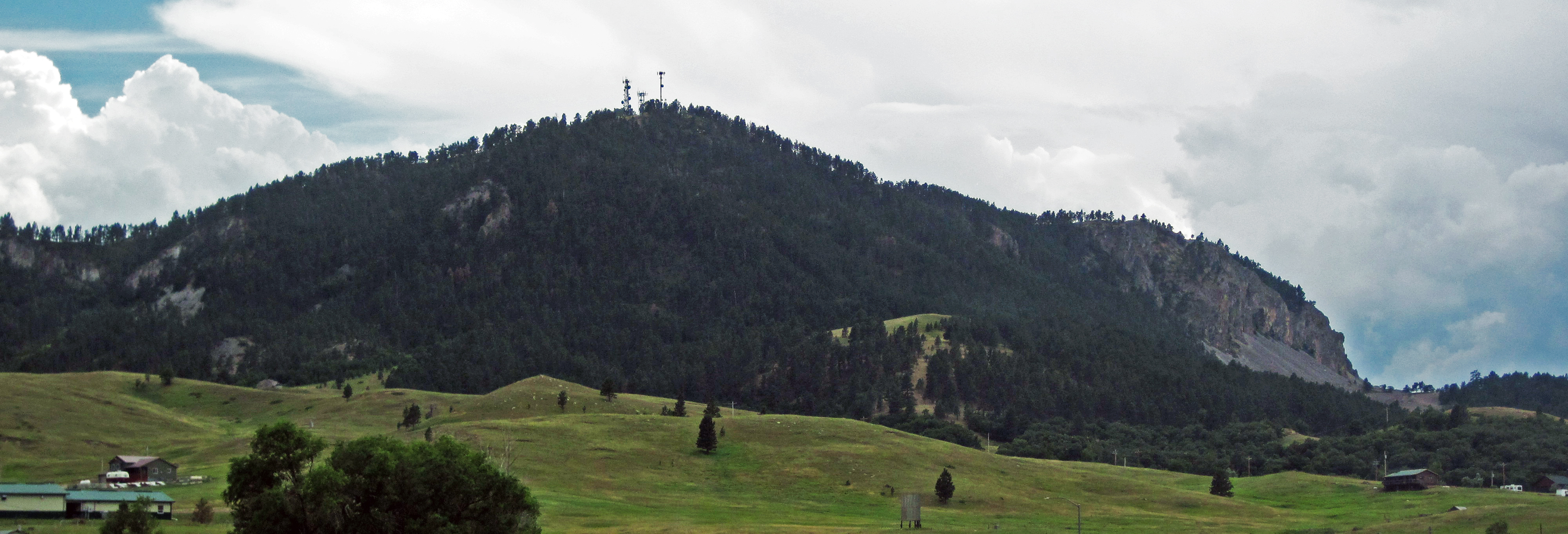
Sundance Mountain is 1 mile south of Sundance, Wyoming and consists of Eocene-aged (~46-50 million years old) porphyritic quartz latites. The rocks here have also been characterized as porphyritic subalkalic rhyolites. Its large intrusion from the open plains makes it a prominent feature.

The southern part of the Bear Lodge Mountains contain the highest elevation areas which contain Warren Peak and Sheep Nose Mountain. Sheep Nose Mountain is a hiking destination and has exposed rock along with its view of Red Canyon which runs all around the Black Hills Region, also notably in the Belle Fourche River valley which contains Devils Tower National Monument.

Along the Belle Fourche River area there is exposed red dirt due to oxidation of iron-rich minerals and sandstone as seen in the Red Valley in the Core Black Hills. To the north the tree cover becomes more sparse until the only trees survive due to the deep soil in certain areas. The tree cover eventually fades into unforested plain area of the Great Plains of which the Black Hills are the only mountain range actually in the Great Plains due to it not being a part of the Rocky Mountains.

=== Climate ===
Sundance 8 NNW is a weather station located in the Bear Lodge Mountains near Warren Peak (Wyoming). Sundance 8 NNW has a humid continental climate (Köppen Dfb), bordering on a subalpine climate (Köppen Dfc).

Climate data for Sundance 8 NNW, Wyoming, 1991–2020 normals: 5792ft (1765m)
Month	Jan	Feb	Mar	Apr	May	Jun	Jul	Aug	Sep	Oct	Nov	Dec	Year
Record high °F (°C)	60 (16)	57 (14)	70 (21)	74 (23)	83 (28)	92 (33)	91 (33)	91 (33)	91 (33)	81 (27)	67 (19)	58 (14)	92 (33)
Mean maximum °F (°C)	49.8 (9.9)	46.6 (8.1)	58.1 (14.5)	67.4 (19.7)	75.8 (24.3)	81.7 (27.6)	86.1 (30.1)	86.1 (30.1)	82.4 (28.0)	70.9 (21.6)	60.6 (15.9)	48.9 (9.4)	87.9 (31.1)
Mean daily maximum °F (°C)	31.5 (−0.3)	30.3 (−0.9)	38.7 (3.7)	45.8 (7.7)	54.9 (12.7)	65.4 (18.6)	75.0 (23.9)	74.2 (23.4)	65.3 (18.5)	49.8 (9.9)	38.8 (3.8)	30.1 (−1.1)	50.0 (10.0)
Daily mean °F (°C)	23.3 (−4.8)	22.4 (−5.3)	30.7 (−0.7)	37.1 (2.8)	46.5 (8.1)	56.0 (13.3)	64.0 (17.8)	63.1 (17.3)	54.8 (12.7)	41.2 (5.1)	31.0 (−0.6)	23.1 (−4.9)	41.1 (5.1)
Mean daily minimum °F (°C)	15.1 (−9.4)	14.5 (−9.7)	22.8 (−5.1)	28.3 (−2.1)	38.1 (3.4)	46.6 (8.1)	53.0 (11.7)	52.1 (11.2)	44.4 (6.9)	32.5 (0.3)	23.2 (−4.9)	16.0 (−8.9)	32.2 (0.1)
Mean minimum °F (°C)	−11.3 (−24.1)	−9.8 (−23.2)	−0.5 (−18.1)	11.8 (−11.2)	23.2 (−4.9)	35.1 (1.7)	42.6 (5.9)	39.4 (4.1)	29.0 (−1.7)	13.8 (−10.1)	1.1 (−17.2)	−9.6 (−23.1)	−16.2 (−26.8)
Record low °F (°C)	−28 (−33)	−28 (−33)	−21 (−29)	−1 (−18)	18 (−8)	29 (−2)	37 (3)	37 (3)	19 (−7)	−3 (−19)	−13 (−25)	−27 (−33)	−28 (−33)
Average precipitation inches (mm)	1.57 (40)	2.03 (52)	2.61 (66)	3.56 (90)	3.86 (98)	2.93 (74)	2.44 (62)	1.92 (49)	1.71 (43)	3.06 (78)	1.79 (45)	1.73 (44)	29.21 (741)
Source 1: NOAA
Source 2: XMACIS (records & monthly max/mins)

== Habitat/Wildlife ==
=== Habitat ===
While ponderosa pine and mixed-grass prairie grow on the highland of this range, its ravines offer habitat to species such as wild rose, skunkbush, sumac, and chokecherry. At the foot of the mountains grow bur oak. Groves of aspen frequently separate meadows with fine soil from ponderosa pine forests growing in coarse soil. Vegetation in the Bear Lodge Mountains is similar to that of the Black Hills, although the Bear Lodge Mountains have no white spruce.

The mountains' growing season is long, and forest growth in this range and the Black Hills is high. This productivity has led to high levels of logging. The Southern Slopes resemble the Northern Black Hills due to proximity and have the most vegetation as seen in the Northern Slopes of the Black Hills having dense forest cover.

=== Wildlife ===
Although bears were extirpated (locally extinct) from the Black Hills due to overhunting and habitat loss, the region has been experiencing sightings of Black Bears wandering from nearby ranges for seasonal hunting and foraging. The Bear Lodge Mountains being close to the Bighorn Mountains which has bears give these sightings credibility. Keyhole State Park contains Keyhole Reservoir which can be considered a boundary of the range. Keyhole Reservoir is a manmade reservoir and has a unique array of fish which include: crappie, perch, smallmouth bass, walleye, northern pike, drum fish and catfish. Unlike the core Black Hills the Bear Lodge Mountains do not have a permanent Mountain goat population which requires more cliffs and peaks than the Bear Lodge Range has.

The area north of Hulett and Devils Tower has a large unusual concentration of ponds and lakes which most likely have fish, possibly forming due to glaciation during the Last Glacial Period. Human impact on the environment has limited impact to the Bear Lodge Mountains due to healthy forest growth and controlled undergrowth burns preventing wildfires. Oreohelix Cooperi or the Black Hills Mountain snail is an exception and a critically imperiled species with an unclear population remaining and is not named under the Endangered Species Act of 1973.

They are endemic to the Black Hills and other subspecies are in two other nearby ranges, the snails used to be fairly common and helped keep undergrowth under control. They currently remain in isolated valleys in the moist northern slopes of the hills and likely the moist southern slopes of the Bear Lodge Mountains. A majority of species are shared with the core Black Hills such as elk, Bighorn sheep, Cougar (Mountain Lion) and Bobcats with the exception of Mountain goat which was introduced to the core Black Hills in the 1920s.

== Access ==
Wyoming Highway 24 (the Bear Lodge Highway) passes through the northern part of the range. There are few airports, with the only notable one being Hulett Municipal Airport-W43 south of the town of Hulett, Wyoming.
