= Radiocentrum =

Scientific classification
- Kingdom: Animalia
- Phylum: Mollusca
- Class: Gastropoda
- Order: Stylommatophora
- Family: Oreohelicidae
- Genus: Radiocentrum; Pilsbry, 1905

Genus of gastropods

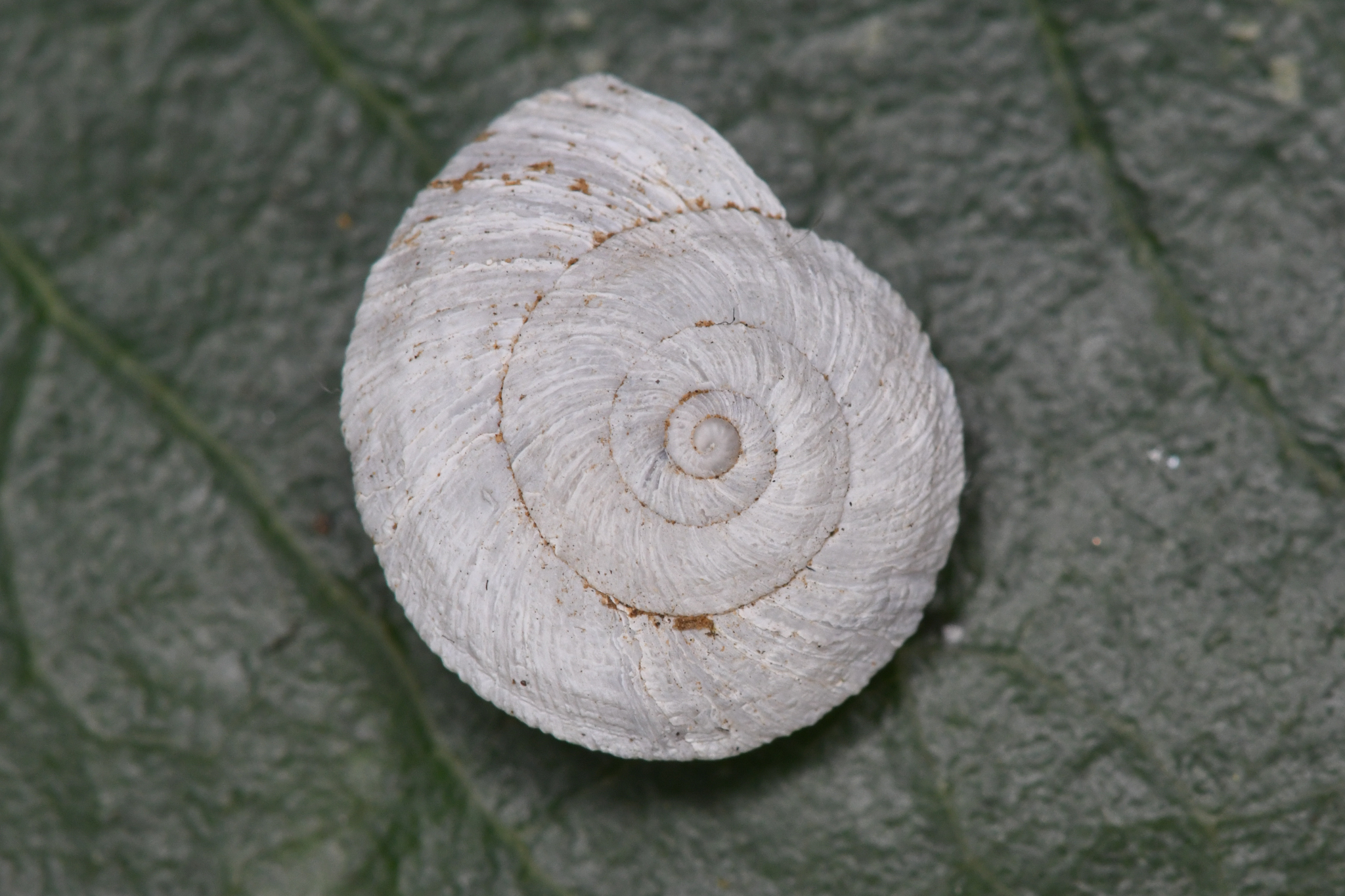
Catalina Mountain snail (Radiocentrum avalonense) in Los Angeles, California, United States.

Radiocentrum is a genus of air-breathing land snails, terrestrial pulmonate gastropod mollusks in the family Oreohelicidae.

== Species ==
Species within the genus Radiocentrum include:

- Radiocentrum avalonense (Hemphill, 1905) - Catalina mountain snail
