= Sundance National Forest =

Forest in Wyoming, United States

Sundance National Forest was established in the Bear Lodge Mountains of Wyoming by the U.S. Forest Service on July 1, 1908. It covered 183,224 acres (741.48 km^{2}) from part of Black Hills National Forest and all of Bear Lodge National Forest. On July 1, 1915 the entire forest was transferred to Black Hills National Forest and the name was discontinued.
