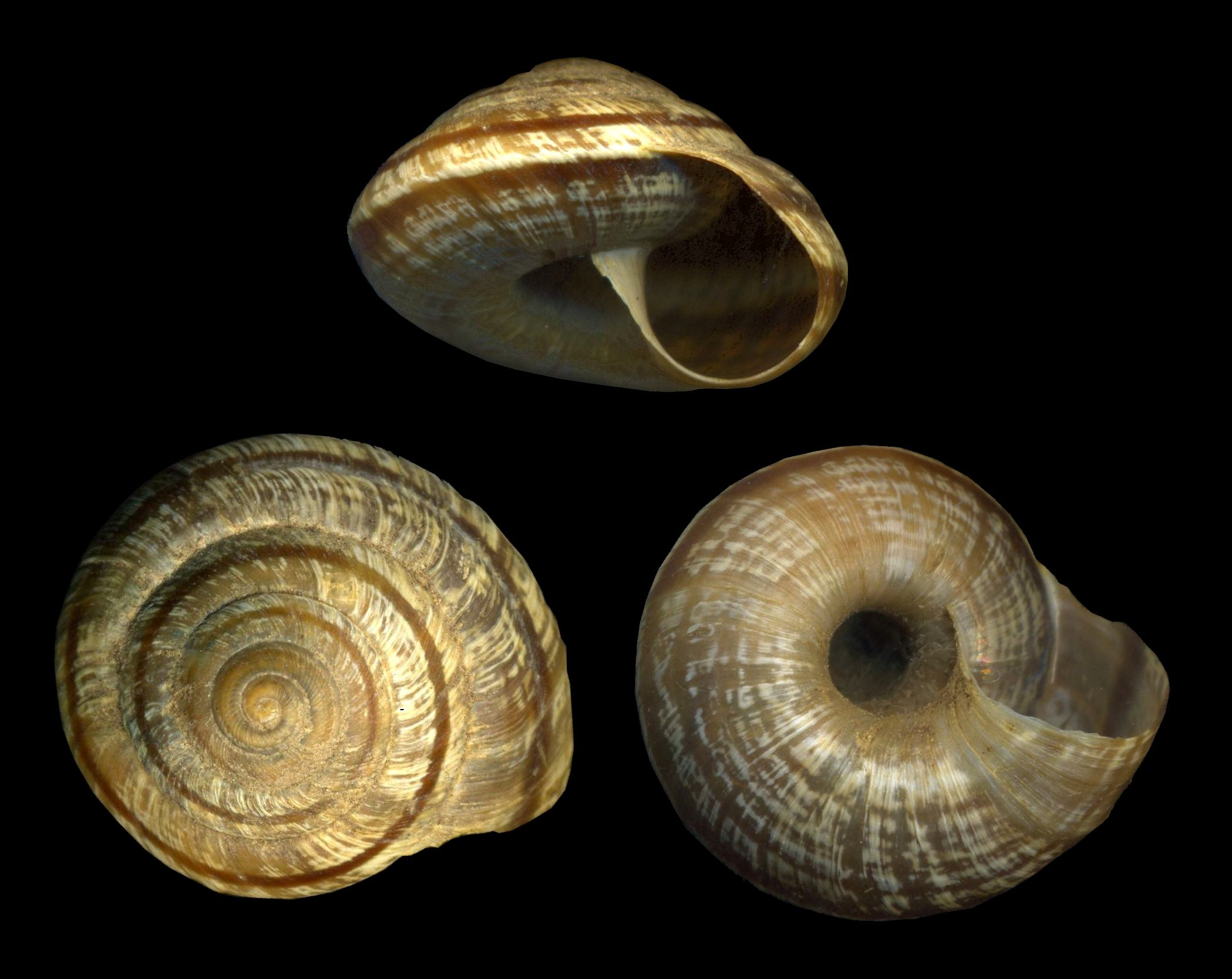
- Three views of a shell of Oreohelix subrudis

Conservation status
- Secure (NatureServe)

Scientific classification
- Kingdom: Animalia
- Phylum: Mollusca
- Class: Gastropoda
- Order: Stylommatophora
- Family: Oreohelicidae
- Genus: Oreohelix
- Species: O. subrudis

Binomial name
- Oreohelix subrudis (Reeve, 1854)

= Oreohelix subrudis =

Species of gastropod

Oreohelix subrudis is a species of air-breathing land snail, a terrestrial pulmonate gastropod mollusk in the family Oreohelicidae.
