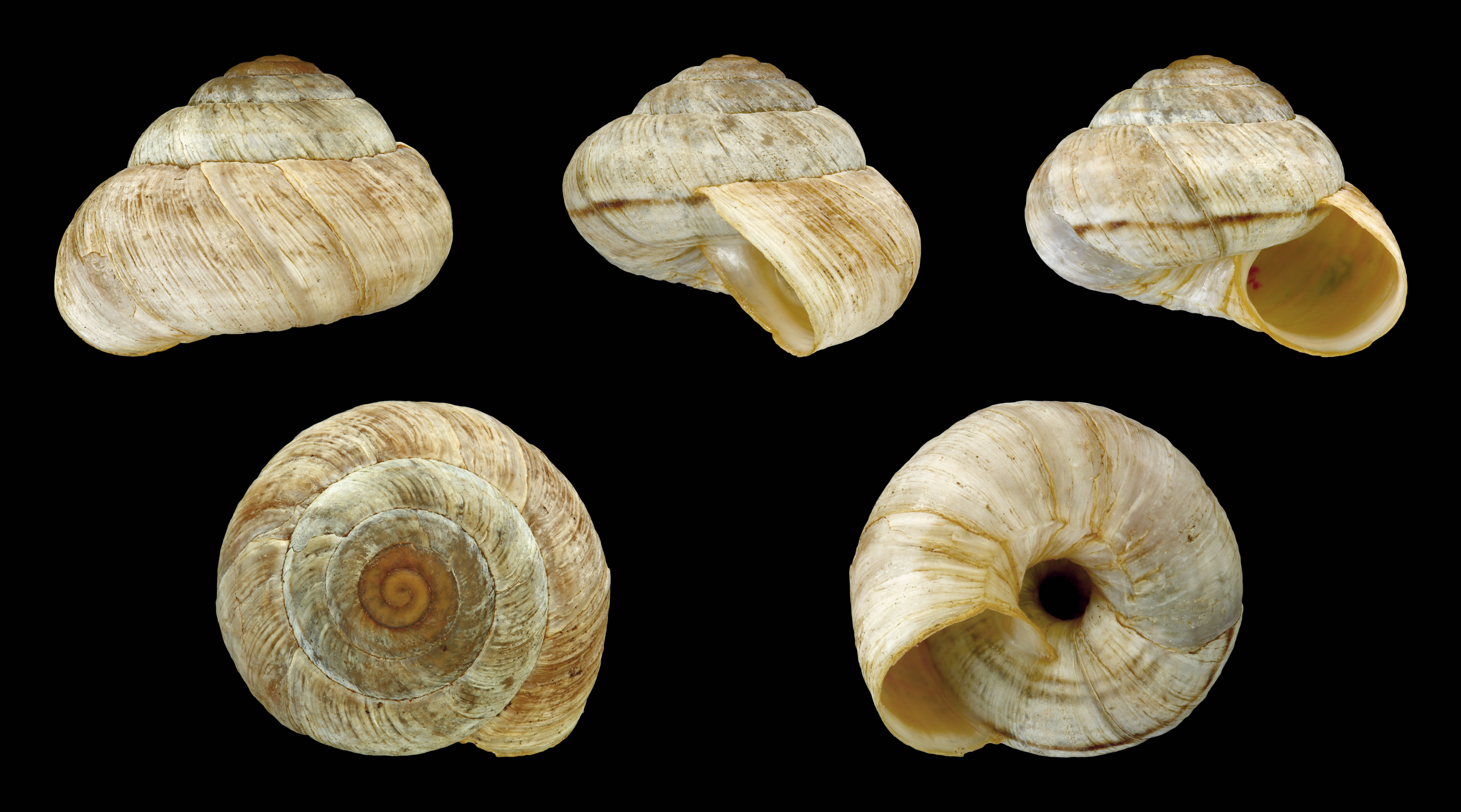

Conservation status
- Vulnerable (NatureServe)

Scientific classification
- Kingdom: Animalia
- Phylum: Mollusca
- Class: Gastropoda
- Order: Stylommatophora
- Family: Oreohelicidae
- Genus: Oreohelix
- Species: O. cooperi

Binomial name
- Oreohelix cooperi (William Binney, 1858)

= Oreohelix cooperi =

Species of snail

Oreohelix cooperi, also known as Cooper’s rocky mountainsnail or the Black Hills mountainsnail, is a critically endangered species of land snail that lives in the Rocky Mountain Ranges and Great Plains of North America. Oreohelix cooperi is a hermaphroditic land snail that possesses low adult vagility and dispersal larvae stage. Due to this spatial restriction, the decreased ability for O. cooperi to migrate leads it to being an endemic species to the Black Hills region.

== Physical description ==
Oreohelix cooperi is in the phylum Mollusca, class Gastropoda, and order Stylommatophora. Within the Oreohelix genus, there are approximately 40-70 different species of land snail. Characteristics of land snails include shells that vary in height and breadth, as well as vary in roundness and flatness. The parts of the shell include a body whorl, spire, and apex. The size of most large mountain land snails species is >5cm. For O. cooperi, differences in shell size can be attributed to environmental factors, such as varying soil calcium concentrations. Differences in size of the adults could be caused by differences in average temperature as well as shell density. There is little genetic structure across its geographic range.

Oreohelix cooperi is hermaphroditic as are most land snails. As a hermaphrodite, they possess the reproductive organs of both males and females. Additionally, O. cooperi are considered ovoviviparous, which means that after fertilization and until birth, the embryos continue to grow within the adult snail.

== Habitat and ecology ==
Oreohelix cooperi lives in the Black Hills, east of the Rocky Mountains, in South Dakota and Wyoming. The Black Hills region is characterized by a variety of habitats including prairie, deciduous forests, and coniferous forests. This semi-arid region can maintain moisture throughout the year, which is facilitated by structural components such as down woody material. The Black Hills receives its moisture from clouds coming from the west as the higher altitudes produce a rain shadow effect on the eastern slope of the range. Oreohelix cooperi can occupy this region, as they prefer moist forest microhabitats with high calcium concentrations.

Due to the fact that O. cooperi has low adult vagility and low dispersal at the larvae stage, they are likely to remain restricted in the Black Hills. Due to this spatially restricted distribution, O. cooperi is considered an endemic species. They are restricted to areas with a high concentrations of calcium, such as limestone and dolomite substrates, which allows them to maintain their shells. Winters are cold, and summers are hot, as a consequence of continental climatic patterns. O. cooperi is able to overwinter as well as the ability to undergo aestivation in the summer.

== Threats and conservation ==
Habitat loss is currently causing a decline in population sizes of Oreohelix cooperi. Populations of O. cooperi are currently at risk due to the threats posed by fire, road-building, motorized recreation, and mining. Management activities also pose a threat to populations of O. cooperi, as they could change the composition of cover provided by vegetation growth and litter, as well as ground temperature. Additionally, it is also difficult to recolonize isolated populations of O. cooperi. Climate change also poses a threat to O. cooperi populations, as it could lead to changes in moisture availability in the Black Forest region of South Dakota and Wyoming.

Although there have been recommendations to list O. cooperi as a protected species under the Endangered Species Act (ESA), it is currently not listed. Oreohelix cooperi is also not listed on the IUCN Red List. Due to habitat fragmentation and degradation, population numbers of O. cooperi continue to decline.
