= Inyan Kara Mountain =

- U.S. National Register of Historic Places
- U.S. Historic district
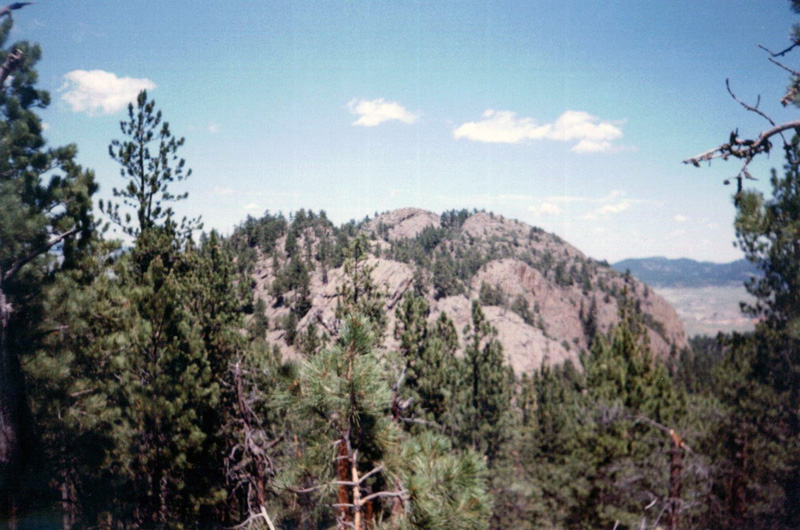

- Location within Wyoming Location within the United States
- Nearest city: Sundance, Wyoming
- Coordinates: 44°12′45″N 104°20′40″W
- Area: 480 acres (190 ha)
- NRHP reference No.: 73001929
- Added to NRHP: April 24, 1973

Inyan Kara Mountain

Highest point
- Elevation: 6,368 feet (1,941 m)

Geography
- Location: Wyoming, US
- Parent range: Bear Lodge Mountains, part of the Black Hills
- Topo map: USGS Black Hills

Inyan Kara Mountain (Lakota: Íŋyaŋ Káǧa, Rock Gatherer) is a mountain associated with the Bear Lodge Mountains of Crook County, Wyoming, (part of the Black Hills) that is considered sacred by the Lakota people, particularly for mothers in childbirth. Inyan Kara stands apart from the main body of the Black Hills, with an elevation of 6,368 feet (1,941 m). The mountain was stated to rumble on quiet days by the local Native Americans and by early explorers. No mention of the noises is found after 1833; the noise has been attributed to gas escaping from burning coal seams.

The peak was visited by George Armstrong Custer during Custer's 1874 Black Hills Expedition, reaching the summit on July 23.

The peak was placed on the National Register of Historic Places in 1973.

== Cosmological role of stone ==
In the cosmology of the Oceti Sakowin people, also known as the Great Sioux Nation, Inyan, which means stone, was considered one of the original spirits. These spirits existed before the formation of the Earth. This is along side Wakan Tanka (The Great Mystery) and Han (The Spirt of Darkness). According to the traditional belief Inyan sacrificed much of his power to create the Earth, giving it water. Described as his blue, life giving blood, and later created the sun and the first humans. Following this Inyan became hard and could barely move, but he remains present within the earth as stone. For this reason, the stone is sometimes addressed as Tunkasila (Grandfather)

== Legend of Stone Boy and Inyan Kara ==
A traditional legend tells of a women who, after her four brothers disappeared, swallowed a small while stone and gave birth to a boy. Named Inyan Hoksila (Stone Boy). Stone boy later found the being that resulted in his uncles disappearance, and using heated stoned and steam, revived them. This is identified as the origin of the Inipi (sweat lodge) ceremony, in which water is poured over heated rocks to create purifying steam. Inyan Kara is linked directly to the legend of stone boy and the sacredness to mothers giving birth.

== Custer's 1874 Expedition and conflict ==
Exclusive use of the Black Hills by the Lakota was short lived. In 1874, U.S Army Lieutenant Colonel George Armstrong Custer led an expedition of 1,000 men and 500 cattle into the Black Hills to establish military post and the exploration for gold. Custer's column reached Inyan Kara on July 22, 1874. The following day, Custer climbed the summit, leaving the inscription "74 Custer."

Custer's journey into the Black Hills resulted in the discovery of gold near Deadwood, South Dakota. This resulted into tension and anger from the Lakota people, resulting in the blood military campaigns of 1876 and Custer's defeat and death at the Battle of the Little Bighorn.

== Geology ==
The mountain is a prominent "structural dome" and igneous intrusion, composed of a light-colored syenite porphyry or alkali rhyolite, which was emplaced as a small laccolith during the Eocene Epoch. This igneous activity occurred approximately 50 to 58 million years ago, as part of the broader volcanic event that formed other nearby landmarks such as Devils Tower and the Missouri Buttes. Magma did not reach the surface, but instead pushed up the existing sedimentary rocks, creating the dome that is 1.5 miles (2 km) across. The intrusion pushed through roughly 4,000 feet of sedimentary rock, spanning in age from the Mississippian Age, to the Cretaceous. The oldest rocks are Pahasapa Limestone. This is overlain by Minnelusa, Opeche, Minnekahta, and red shale from the Spearfish Formation.

== Photo gallery ==
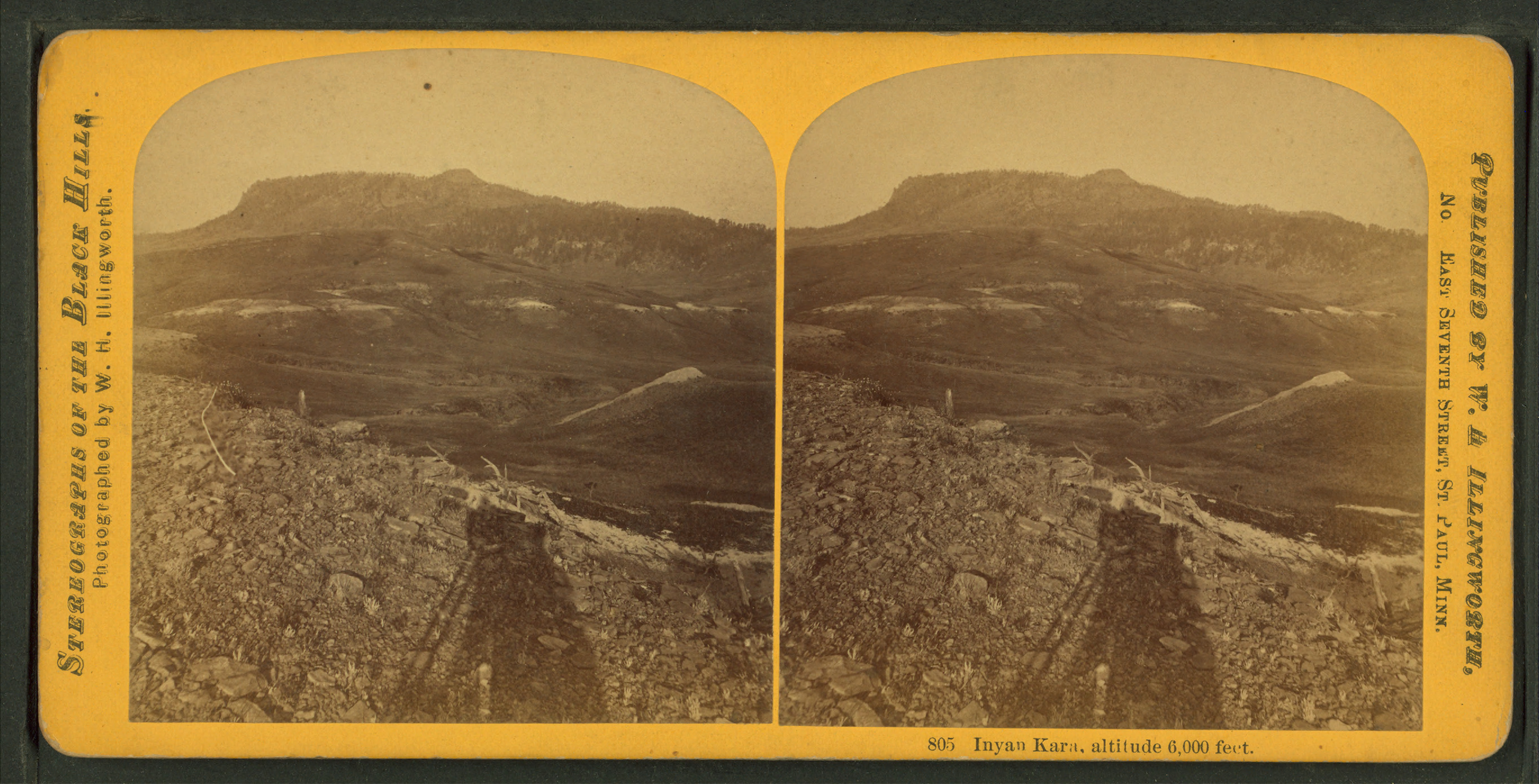
Inyan Kara, altitude 6,000 feet., a stereoscopic photograph from 1874 by William H. Illingworth

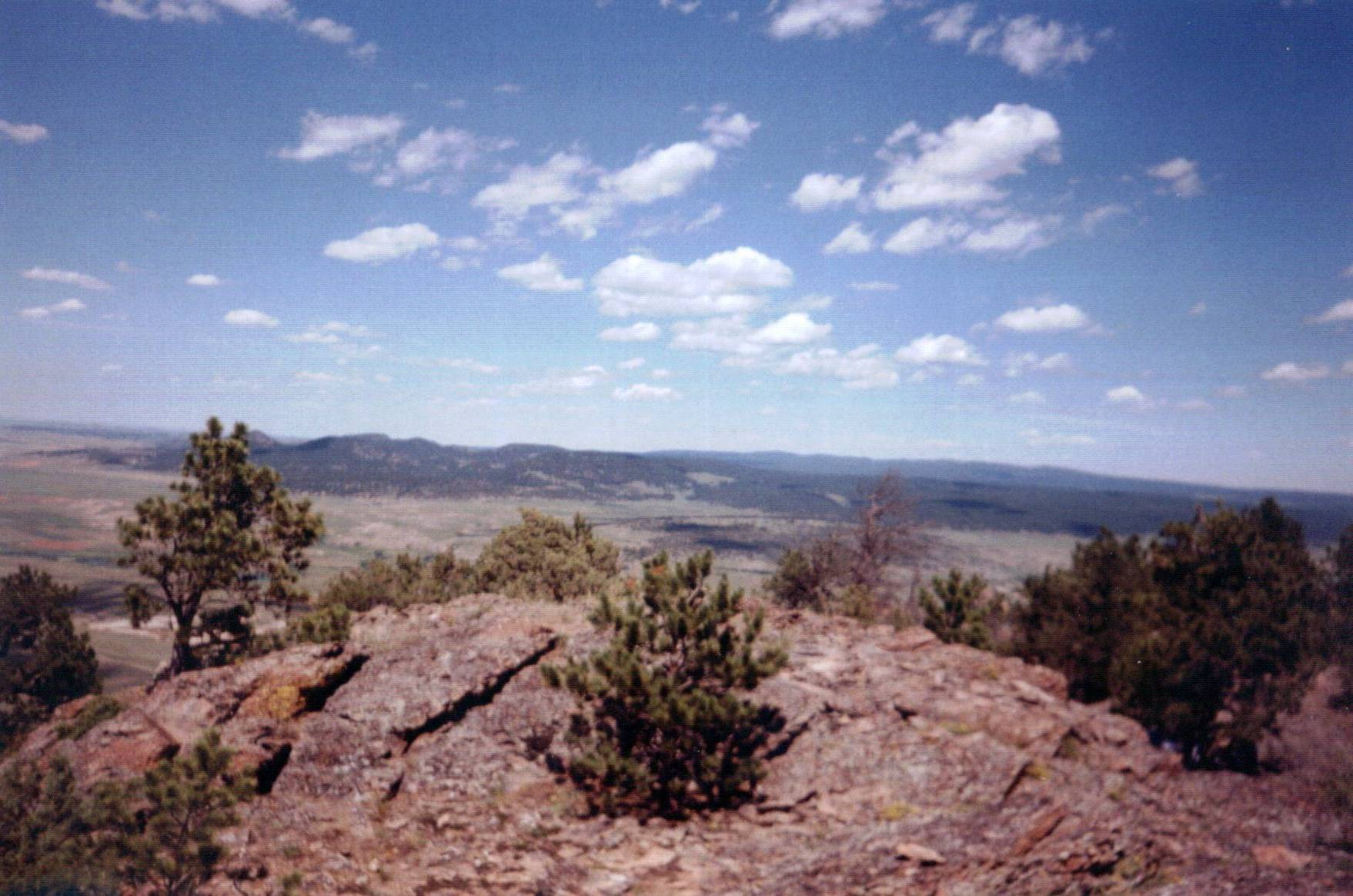
The Black Hills from the summit of Inyan Kara

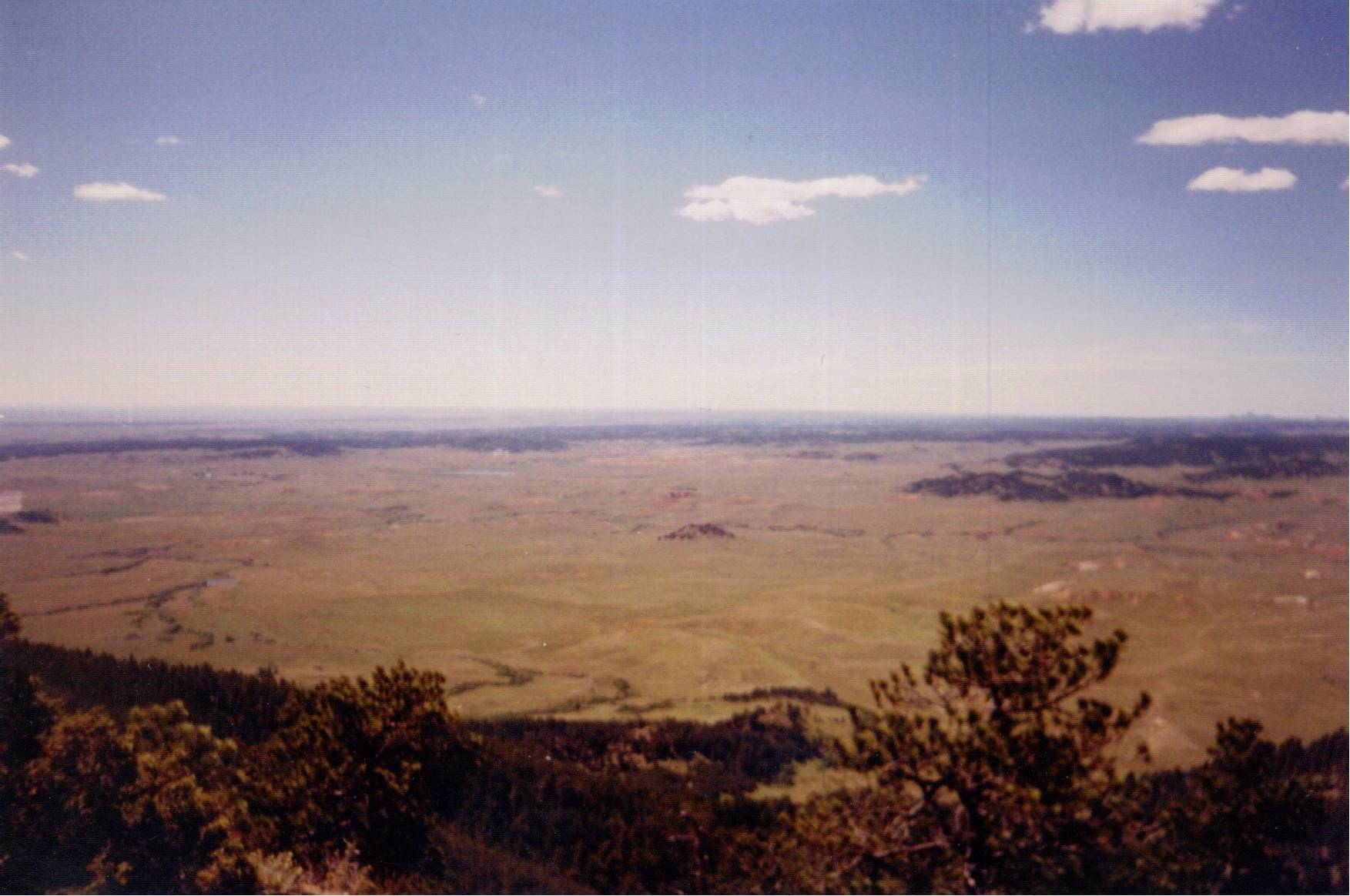
The prairie surrounding the Black Hills from the summit of Inyan Kara
