= Bear Lodge National Forest =

Former national forest in Wyoming

Coordinates: 44.4121°N 104.3570°W

Bear Lodge National Forest is a discontinued entity which has been absorbed into the Black Hills National Forest. It is located in the U.S. in the state of Wyoming, in the north central part of the American mainland. It was established in the Bear Lodge Mountains by the U.S. Forest Service in Wyoming on July 1, 1907, with 136,784 acres (553.55 km^{2}). The forest was named for Devils Tower or the "Bear Lodge". On July 1, 1908, the forest was combined with part of Black Hills National Forest to establish Sundance National Forest and the name was discontinued. The lands are presently included in Black Hills National Forest.
