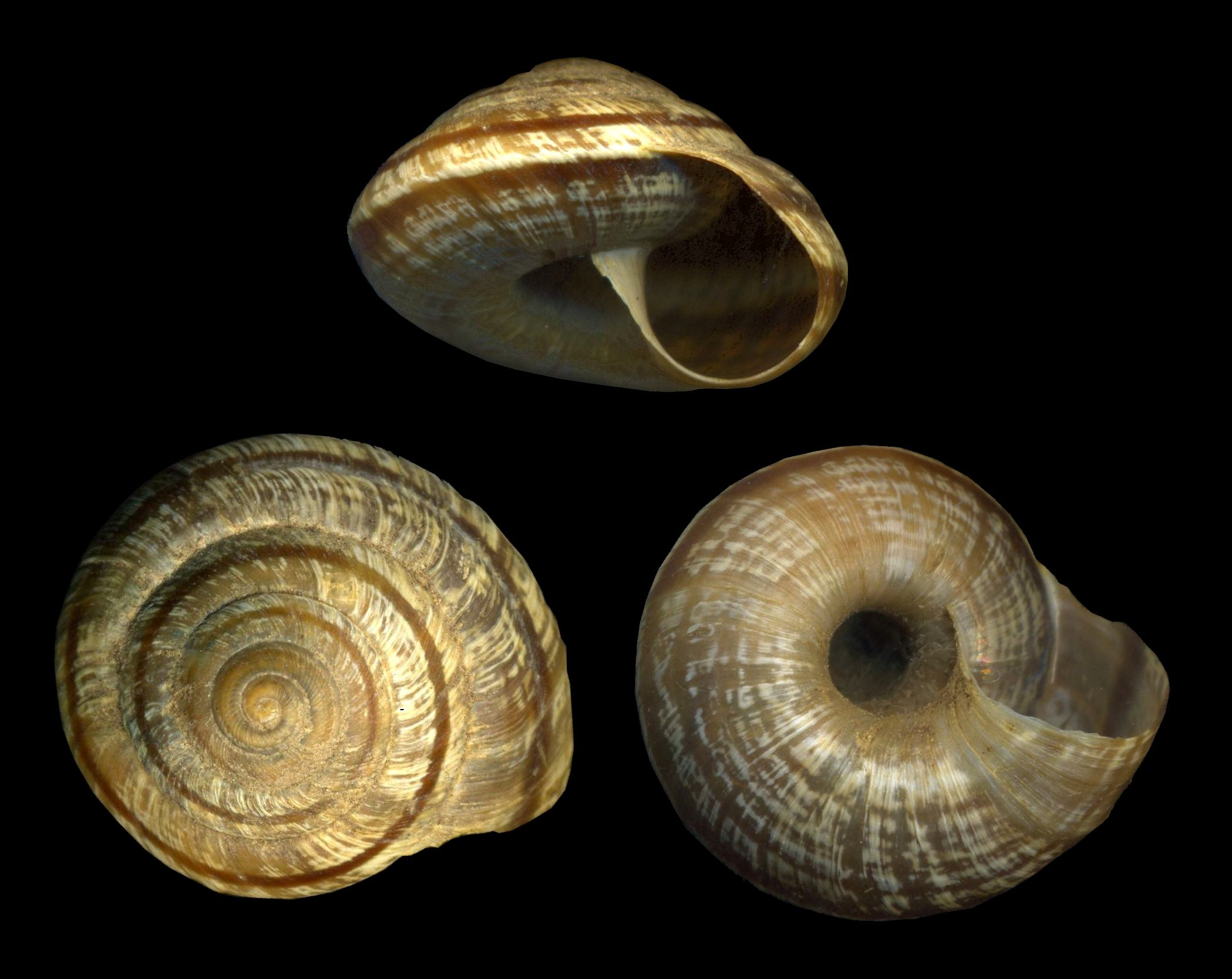
- Three views of an 18 mm shell of Oreohelix subrudis

Scientific classification
- Kingdom: Animalia
- Phylum: Mollusca
- Class: Gastropoda
- Order: Stylommatophora
- Family: Oreohelicidae
- Genus: Oreohelix; Pilsbry, 1904

= Oreohelix =

Genus of gastropods

Oreohelix is a genus of air-breathing land snail, a terrestrial pulmonate gastropod mollusk in the family Oreohelicidae.

Oreohelix is the type genus for the family Oreohelicidae.

There are about 79 species in this genus. They are native to the western United States, especially the Rocky Mountains, Great Basin, and Southwest.

== Species ==
Species within the genus Oreohelix include:

- Oreohelix alpina – alpine mountainsnail
- Oreohelix amariradix – Bitter Root mountainsnail
- Oreohelix anchana – Ancha mountainsnail
- Oreohelix barbata – bearded mountainsnail
- Oreohelix californica – Clark mountainsnail
- Oreohelix carinifera – keeled mountainsnail
- Oreohelix concentrata – Huachuca mountainsnail
- Oreohelix confragosa – Pinos Altos mountainsnail
- Oreohelix cooperi- Cooper's rocky mountainsnail
- Oreohelix elrodi – carinate mountainsnail
- Oreohelix eurekensis – Eureka mountainsnail
- Oreohelix hammeri – Seven Devils mountainsnail
- Oreohelix handi – spring mountainsnail
- Oreohelix haydeni – lyrate mountainsnail
- Oreohelix hendersoni – pallid mountainsnail
- Oreohelix howardi – Mill Creek mountainsnail
- Oreohelix idahoensis – costate mountainsnail
- Oreohelix intersum – Deep Slide mountainsnail
- Oreohelix jaegeri – Kyle Canyon mountainsnail
- Oreohelix jugalis – Boulder Pile mountainsnail
- Oreohelix junii – Grand Coulee mountainsnail
- Oreohelix magdalenae – Magdalena mountainsnail
- Oreohelix metcalfei – Black Range mountainsnail
- Oreohelix nevadensis – Schell Creek mountainsnail
- Oreohelix neomexicana - Oscura Mountain Land Snail
- Oreohelix peripherica – Deseret mountainsnail
  - Oreohelix peripherica peripherica (Ancey, 1881)
  - Oreohelix peripherica wasatchensis (Binney, 1886)
- Oreohelix pilsbryi – Mineral Creek mountainsnail
- Oreohelix pygmaea – pygmy mountainsnail
- Oreohelix socorroensis – Socorro mountainsnail
- Oreohelix strigosa – rocky mountainsnail
- Oreohelix subrudis – subalpine mountainsnail
- Oreohelix swopei – Morgan Creek mountainsnail
- Oreohelix tenuistriata – thin-ribbed mountainsnail
- Oreohelix vortex – vortex banded mountainsnail
- Oreohelix waltoni – lava rock mountainsnail
- Oreohelix yavapai – Yavapai mountainsnail
