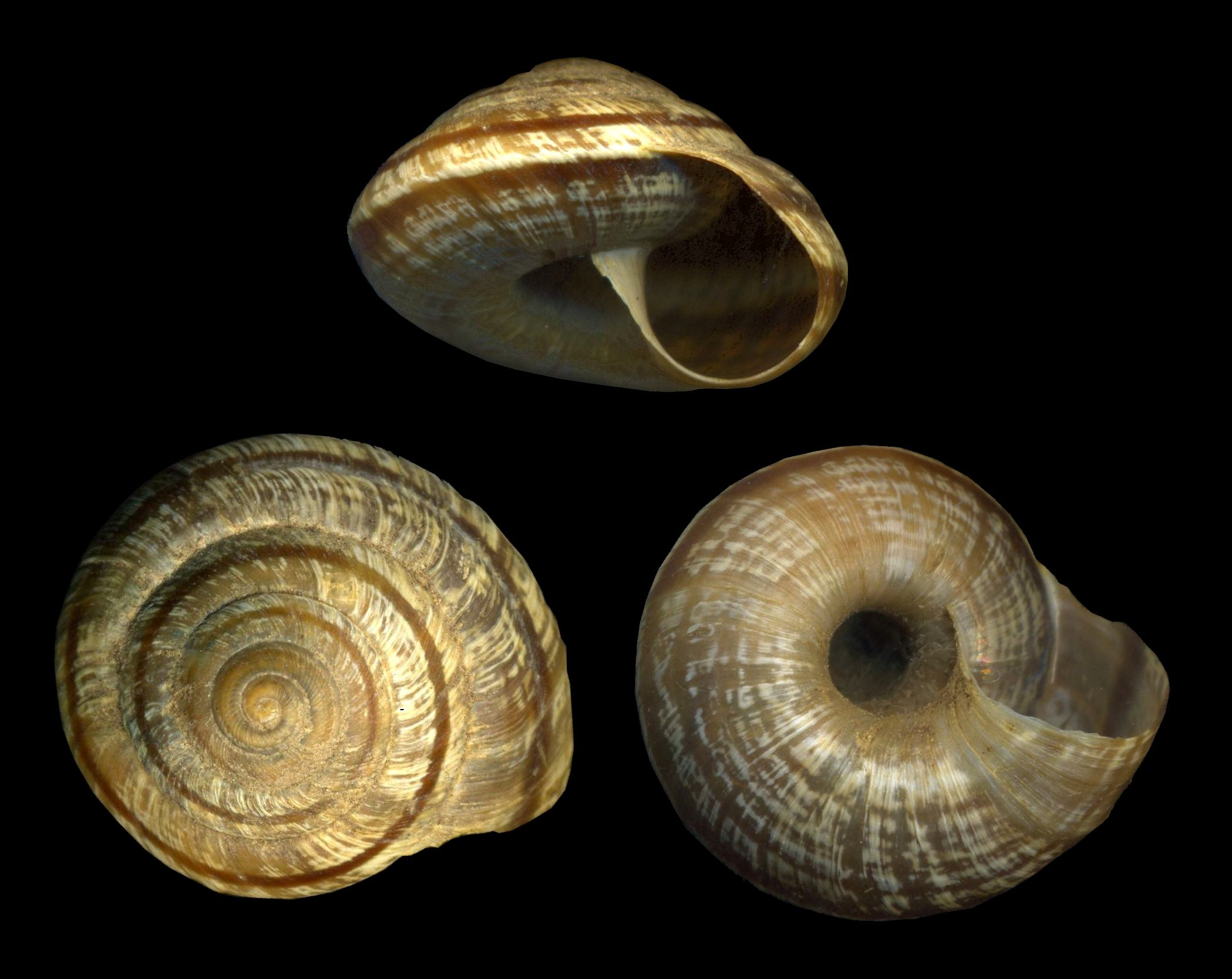
- Three views of a shell of Oreohelix subrudis

Scientific classification
- Kingdom: Animalia
- Phylum: Mollusca
- Class: Gastropoda
- Order: Stylommatophora
- Superfamily: Punctoidea
- Family: Oreohelicidae; Pilsbry, 1939

Genera
- See text

= Oreohelicidae =

Family of gastropods

Oreohelicidae is a family of small to medium-sized air-breathing land snails, terrestrial pulmonate gastropod mollusks in the superfamily Punctoidea (according to the taxonomy of the Gastropoda by Bouchet & Rocroi, 2005).

== Anatomy ==
In this family, the number of haploid chromosomes lies between 31 and 35 (according to the values in this table).

Oreohelix, the type genus, is ovoviviparous. Radiocentrum, a subgenus of Oreohelix, is oviparous(Tompa, 1979). The group as a whole generally lacks any apertural barriers or teeth and displays wide variety of shell morphologies (Burke & Leonard 2014).

== Genera ==
The family Oreohelicidae has no subfamilies.

The type genus is Oreohelix Pilsbry, 1904.

Genera within the family Oreohelicidae include:

- Oreohelix Pilsbry, 1904
- Radiocentrum Pilsbry, 1905
