= National Register of Historic Places listings in Devils Tower National Monument =

This is a list of the National Register of Historic Places listings in Devils Tower National Monument.

This is intended to be a complete list of the properties and districts on the National Register of Historic Places in Devils Tower National Monument, Wyoming, United States. The locations of National Register properties and districts for which the latitude and longitude coordinates are included below, may be seen in a map.

There are four properties and districts listed on the National Register in the park.

This National Park Service list is complete through NPS recent listings posted June 20, 2025.

== Current listings ==
| | Name on the Register | Image | Date listed | Location | City or town | Description |
|---|---|---|---|---|---|---|
| 1 | Entrance Road-Devils Tower National Monument | Entrance Road-Devils Tower National Monument | July 24, 2000 (#00000854) | Devils Tower National Monument; 44°35′12″N 104°42′25″W | Devils Tower | Three-mile (4.8 km) road and entrance station noted for their naturalistic landscape architecture, associations with the New Deal, and the early development of the national monument. |
| 2 | Entrance Station-Devils Tower National Monument | Entrance Station-Devils Tower National Monument | July 24, 2000 (#00000853) | Devils Tower National Monument; 44°35′22″N 104°42′02″W | Devils Tower | 1941 park building noted for its exemplary NPS Rustic architecture, and for its associations with the New Deal and the early development and management of the national monument. |
| 3 | Old Headquarters Area Historic District | Old Headquarters Area Historic District | July 20, 2000 (#00000852) | Devils Tower National Monument; 44°35′26″N 104°43′15″W | Devils Tower | Three buildings constructed by the Civilian Conservation Corps 1931–37, noted for their association with the New Deal, the development of the first U.S. National Monument, and for their exemplary NPS Rustic architecture. |
| 4 | Tower Ladder-Devils Tower National Monument | Tower Ladder-Devils Tower National Monument | July 24, 2000 (#00000855) | Devils Tower National Monument; 44°35′25″N 104°42′53″W | Devils Tower | Surviving 170-foot (52 m) section of an 1893 ladder built for the first known ascent of Devils Tower and used in numerous subsequent attempts up to 1927, which helped galvanize recreational climbing of the tower and local support for its protection. |

== See also ==
- National Register of Historic Places listings in Crook County, Wyoming
- National Register of Historic Places listings in Wyoming
