= National Register of Historic Places listings in Crook County, Wyoming =

Location of Crook County in Wyoming

This is a list of the National Register of Historic Places listings in Crook County, Wyoming.

This is intended to be a complete list of the properties and districts on the National Register of Historic Places in Crook County, Wyoming, United States. The locations of National Register properties and districts for which the latitude and longitude coordinates are included below, may be seen in a map.

There are 13 properties and districts listed on the National Register in the county.

This National Park Service list is complete through NPS recent listings posted September 26, 2025.

Contents: Counties in Wyoming
Albany - Big Horn - Campbell - Carbon - Converse - Crook - Fremont - Goshen - Hot Springs - Johnson - Laramie - Lincoln - Natrona - Niobrara - Park - Platte - Sheridan - Sublette - Sweetwater - Teton - Uinta - Washakie - Weston

== Current listings ==
	Name on the Register	Image	Date listed	Location	City or town	Description
1	Arch Creek Petroglyphs (48CK41)	Arch Creek Petroglyphs (48CK41)	December 4, 1986 (#86003458)	Address restricted	Moorcroft vicinity	Well-preserved Native American petroglyphs of an atypical style featuring elongated stick figures.
2	DXN Bridge over Missouri River	DXN Bridge over Missouri River	February 22, 1985 (#85000419)	Crook County Road 18-200; 44°58′58″N 104°29′41″W	Hulett vicinity	Circa-1920 Pratt pony truss bridge, unique in Wyoming for lacking the usual diagonal end posts.
3	Entrance Road-Devils Tower National Monument	Entrance Road-Devils Tower National Monument	July 24, 2000 (#00000854)	Devils Tower National Monument; 44°35′12″N 104°42′25″W	Devils Tower	Three-mile (4.8 km) road and entrance station noted for their naturalistic landscape architecture, associations with the New Deal, and the early development of the national monument.
4	Entrance Station-Devils Tower National Monument	Entrance Station-Devils Tower National Monument	July 24, 2000 (#00000853)	Devils Tower National Monument; 44°35′22″N 104°42′02″W	Devils Tower	1941 park building noted for its exemplary NPS Rustic architecture, and for its associations with the New Deal and the early development and management of the national monument.
5	Inyan Kara Mountain	Inyan Kara Mountain	April 24, 1973 (#73001929)	About 15 mi (24 km) south of Sundance in Black Hills National Forest; 44°12′48″N 104°21′00″W	Sundance vicinity	Outlying peak of the Black Hills, figuring in the Lakota people's culture and network of signalling sites, and a landmark to White explorers and military expeditions.
6	McKean Archeological Site (48CK7)	McKean Archeological Site (48CK7)	April 1, 1991 (#91000326)	Within the Keyhole Reservoir; 44°21′55″N 104°50′20″W	Moorcroft	Extensive and well-stratified site showing 5,000 years of Native American use; further significant as a key type site for Middle Plains Archaic period projectile points and in the professional development of Northern Plains archaeology.
7	Old Headquarters Area Historic District	Old Headquarters Area Historic District	July 20, 2000 (#00000852)	Devils Tower National Monument; 44°35′26″N 104°43′15″W	Devils Tower	Three buildings constructed by the Civilian Conservation Corps 1931–37, noted for their association with the New Deal, the development of the first U.S. National Monument, and for their exemplary NPS Rustic architecture.
8	Ranch A	Ranch A	March 17, 1997 (#97000227)	501 Sand Creek Rd. 44°29′24″N 104°06′38″W	Beulah	Vacation estate of newspaper publisher Moses Annenberg with 13 contributing properties built 1932–1935; noted as some of the finest rustic architecture in Wyoming. Now an event center.
9	Sundance School	Sundance School	December 2, 1985 (#85003099)	108 N. 4th St. 44°24′22″N 104°22′40″W	Sundance	Sundance's most architecturally prominent public building and a rare local use of locally quarried stone. Also a key venue in the development of the region's youth 1923–1971. Now the Crook County Museum and Art Gallery.
10	Sundance State Bank	Sundance State Bank	March 23, 1984 (#84003660)	301 Main St. 44°24′22″N 104°22′47″W	Sundance	1914 bank noted for its distinctive transitional architecture and its association with a speculative boom in the Wyoming banking industry due to inflated agricultural prices during World War I.
11	Tower Ladder-Devils Tower National Monument	Tower Ladder-Devils Tower National Monument	July 24, 2000 (#00000855)	Devils Tower National Monument; 44°35′25″N 104°42′53″W	Devils Tower	Surviving 170-foot (52 m) section of an 1893 ladder built for the first known ascent of Devils Tower and used in numerous subsequent attempts up to 1927, which helped galvanize recreational climbing of the tower and local support for its protection.
12	Vore Buffalo Jump	Vore Buffalo Jump	April 11, 1973 (#73001930)	369 Old U.S. Route 14; 44°32′09″N 104°09′24″W	Beulah vicinity	40-foot-deep (12 m) sinkhole used as a buffalo jump roughly 1300–1700, yielding well-preserved bison bones and projectile points. Now a visitor attraction.
13	Wyoming Mercantile	Wyoming Mercantile	April 16, 1991 (#91000435)	3983 Wyoming Highway 24; 44°38′24″N 104°10′57″W	Aladdin	One of Wyoming's only intact vernacular 19th-century general stores—built in 1896—and the long-serving nucleus of the tiny community of Aladdin.

== See also ==
- List of National Historic Landmarks in Wyoming
- National Register of Historic Places listings in Wyoming
