= National Register of Historic Places listings in Campbell County, Wyoming =

Location of Campbell County in Wyoming

This is a list of the National Register of Historic Places listings in Campbell County, Wyoming. It is intended to be a complete list of the properties and districts on the National Register of Historic Places in Campbell County, Wyoming, United States. The locations of National Register properties and districts for which the latitude and longitude coordinates are included below, may be seen in a map.

There are 9 properties listed on the National Register in the county.

This National Park Service list is complete through NPS recent listings posted August 21, 2026.

Contents: Counties in Wyoming
Albany - Big Horn - Campbell - Carbon - Converse - Crook - Fremont - Goshen - Hot Springs - Johnson - Laramie - Lincoln - Natrona - Niobrara - Park - Platte - Sheridan - Sublette - Sweetwater - Teton - Uinta - Washakie - Weston

== Current listings ==
	Name on the Register	Image	Date listed	Location	City or town	Description
1	Basin Oil Field Tipi Rings	Basin Oil Field Tipi Rings	December 13, 1985 (#85003165)	Address restricted	Piney	Late Prehistoric or Protohistoric camp site with tipi rings, other stone features, and potsherds, illuminating the movement of Middle Missouri tradition people with ceramic technology into the Powder River Basin.
2	Bishop Road Site	Bishop Road Site	December 13, 1985 (#85003202)	Address restricted	Piney	Camp or village site along a stream terrace repeatedly used in the Late Archaic, Late Prehistoric, and Protohistoric periods, with a variety of lithic artifacts, abundant animal bone fragments, and seven hearths.
3	Campbell County State Experiment Farm, Exhibition Hall	Campbell County State Experiment Farm, Exhibition Hall	August 1, 2024 (#100010677)	2910 Doubletree Ln. 44°17′17″N 105°27′28″W	Gillette	1934 exhibition hall standing as a reminder of the state-run agricultural experiment station that operated in Gillette 1920–1980.
4	Clinker Stone House		December 29, 2025 (#100012462)	509 Elk Creek Rd. 44°47′59″N 105°29′37″W	Weston vicinity	Circa-1940 ranch house atypically built with natural clinker stone, an abundant local material produced by ancient coal-seam fires but rarely used in building construction.
5	Daly Petroglyphs	Daly Petroglyphs	May 19, 2025 (#100011833)	Address restricted	Wildcat vicinity	Late Prehistoric and Protohistoric petroglyphs masterfully representing spiritual and cultural traditions of the Crow people and other Powder River Basin natives, including an identifiable character from Crow mythology and highly decorated warriors.
6	Gillette City Hall (1936)	Gillette City Hall (1936)	September 27, 2019 (#100004422)	400 S. Gillette Ave. 44°17′28″N 105°30′16″W	Gillette	1936 multipurpose municipal hall, noted for Art Deco architecture reminiscent of the era's New Deal projects but built with all local funding. Also a contributing property to the Gillette Downtown Historic District.
7	Gillette Downtown Historic District	Gillette Downtown Historic District	January 3, 2023 (#100008517)	Downtown Gillette south of the Burlington Northern-Santa Fe Railroad tracks and on both sides of S. Gillette Ave. from 1st St. to 7th St. 44°17′28″N 105°30′14″W	Gillette	Six-block central business district of a major northeastern Wyoming city, with 30 contributing properties built 1898–1971 in a wide array of architectural styles.
8	Gillette Post Office	Gillette Post Office	October 14, 2008 (#08001002)	301 S. Gillette Ave. 44°17′31″N 105°30′13″W	Gillette	1935 post office funded by the Public Works Administration, noted for its Neoclassical architecture, association with New Deal job creation, and as a symbol of Gillette's connection to the federal government. Also a contributing property to the Gillette Downtown Historic District.
9	Nine Mile Segment, Bozeman Trail	Nine Mile Segment, Bozeman Trail	July 23, 1989 (#89000813)	Address restricted	Pine Tree Junction	Segment of the Bozeman Trail with some of its best preserved wagon wheel ruts.

== See also ==
- List of National Historic Landmarks in Wyoming
- National Register of Historic Places listings in Wyoming
