= Campbell County State Experiment Farm, Exhibition Hall =

- U.S. National Register of Historic Places
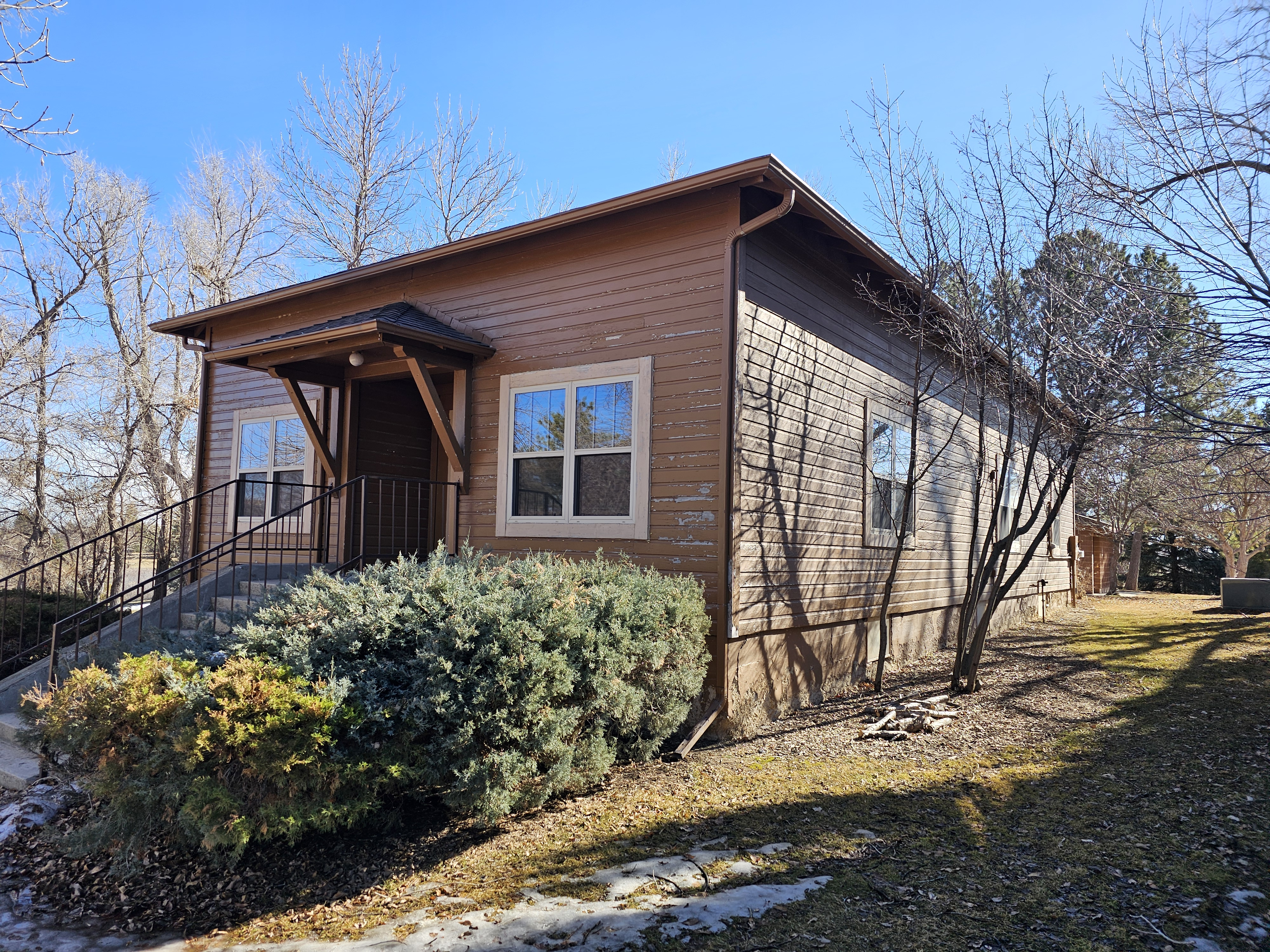

- Location within Wyoming Location within the United States
- Location: 2910 Doubletree Lane, Gillette, Wyoming
- Coordinates: 44.288120°N 105.457933°W
- Built: 1934
- NRHP reference No.: 100010677
- Added to NRHP: August 1, 2024

Campbell County State Experiment Farm, Exhibition Hall was built in 1934 in Gillette, Wyoming, in Campbell County, Wyoming. The Exhibition Hall is now in CAM-PLEX Park. Campbell County State Experiment Farm was an Experiment Farm run by the University of Wyoming in Laramie, Wyoming. The exhibit hall use by the Wyoming Agricultural Experiment Station program. The Wyoming Agricultural Experiment Station program had nine agricultural stations. The Agricultural Stations were built around the State of Wyoming. The Agricultural Stations grew crops to show what kinds of crops would successful grow in that region of Wyoming. The Exhibition Hall is now under the Gillette Historic Preservation Commission. Other early University of Wyoming experiment farms were located in Laramie, Lander, Saratoga, Sheridan, Sundance, and Wheatland.

== See also ==
- Gillette City Hall
- Gillette Post Office
