= DXN =

DXN may refer to:

- Noida International Airport, the IATA code DXN
- 3Dc, also known as DXN, a lossy data compression algorithm for normal maps

== See also ==
- DXN Bridge, one of a group of thirty-one bridges in Wyoming
