= Gillette Downtown Historic District =

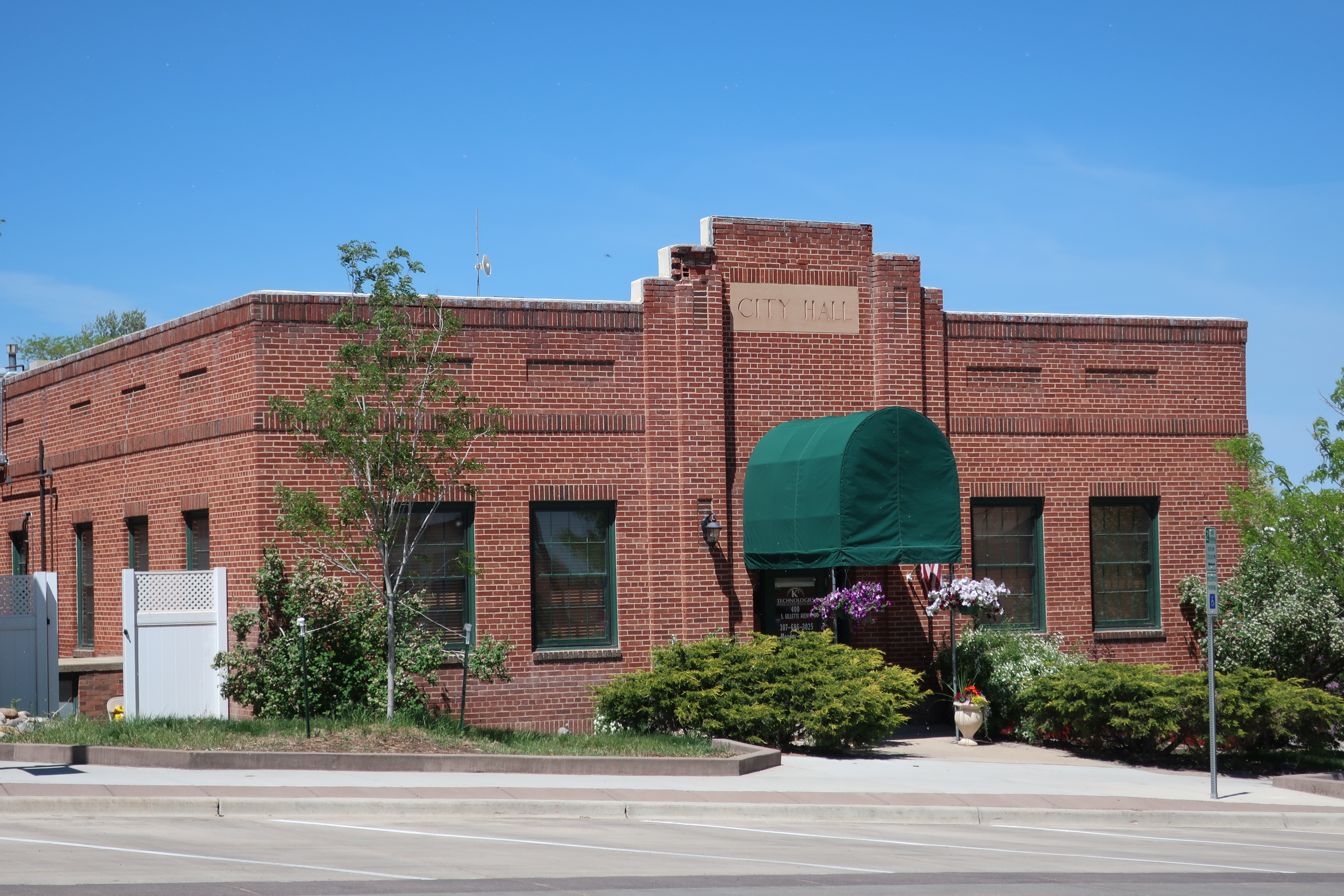
- City Hall Mall in Gillette, Wyoming, part of Gillette Downtown Historic District

- Location within Wyoming Location within the United States
- Location: Downtown, Gillette, Wyoming
- Coordinates: 44.291219°N 105.503967°W
- Built: 1934
- NRHP reference No.: 1. 100008517
- Added to NRHP: January 3, 2023

Gillette Downtown Historic District is in Downtown Gillette, Wyoming in Campbell County, Wyoming. Gillette was founded in 1891 in northeastern Wyoming. Gillette founded as a railroad town after the arrival of the Chicago, Burlington and Quincy Railroad. Gillette became the county seat of Campbell County after Crook and Weston counties merged in 1911. The Black and Yellow Trail an early highway came through Gillette. The highway ran from Chicago, Illinois to Yellowstone National Park. Gillette Downtown Historic District has many different architectural styles including: late Victorian Italianate commercial buildings, residential Victorian architecture with Queen Anne elements, and Classical Revival, Neo-Classical/Starved Classicism, Art Deco, and early-to-mid twentieth-century public and commercial architecture. In 1914 at Montgomery Bar outlaw Ray Montgomery beat up mayor Mark Shields to take over as mayor. The center of the Historic District is the former City Hall. Gillette Downtown Historic District covers six-blocks in the central business district. There are 30 properties built between 1898 and 1971 in the Gillette Downtown Historic District.

In the Gillette Downtown Historic District are:

- Gillette City Hall built in 1936, also on NRHP
- Old City Hall built in 1898
- Post office built in 1935
- Chassell & Fish Building built in 1902
- Dodd House/Goings Hotel two-story built in 1908
- Courthouse
- Meeting hall
- Hotel
- Warehouse
- Restaurant
- Houses
- Stockmen's Bank built in 1926
- Bank of Gillette built in 1920
- Center Bar built 1941
- Olzer Saddlery built in 1907
- Chasell House built in 1906
- Stockmen's Bank built in 1926
- Campbell County Public Library built in 1941, architect Frederick Hutchinson Porter
- Montgomery Bar and hotel built in 1911
- First Lutheran Church built in 1948

== See also ==
- Gillette Post Office
