= National Register of Historic Places listings in Wyoming =

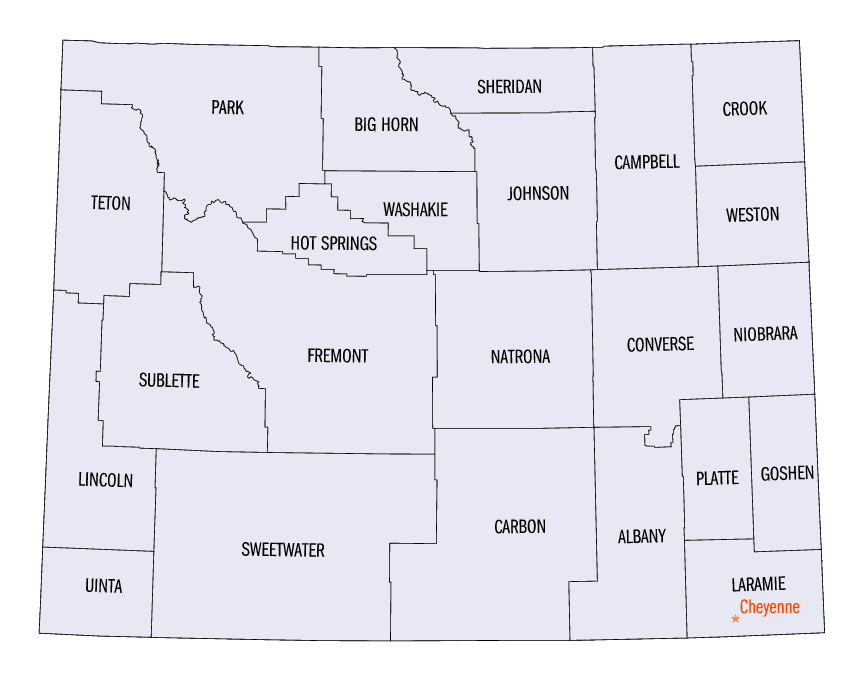
Wyoming counties (clickable)

This is a directory of properties and districts listed on the National Register of Historic Places in Wyoming. There are more than 500 listed sites in Wyoming. Each of the 23 counties in Wyoming has at least four listings on the National Register.

This National Park Service list is complete through NPS recent listings posted August 21, 2026.

Contents: Counties in Wyoming
Albany - Big Horn - Campbell - Carbon - Converse - Crook - Fremont - Goshen - Hot Springs - Johnson - Laramie - Lincoln - Natrona - Niobrara - Park - Platte - Sheridan - Sublette - Sweetwater - Teton - Uinta - Washakie - Weston

== Current listings by county ==
The following are approximate tallies of current listings in Wyoming on the National Register of Historic Places. These counts are based on entries in the National Register Information Database as of April 24, 2008 and new weekly listings posted since then on the National Register of Historic Places web site. There are frequent additions to the listings and occasional delistings, and the counts here are not official. Also, the counts in this table exclude boundary increase and decrease listings which modify the area covered by an existing property or district and which carry a separate National Register reference number.

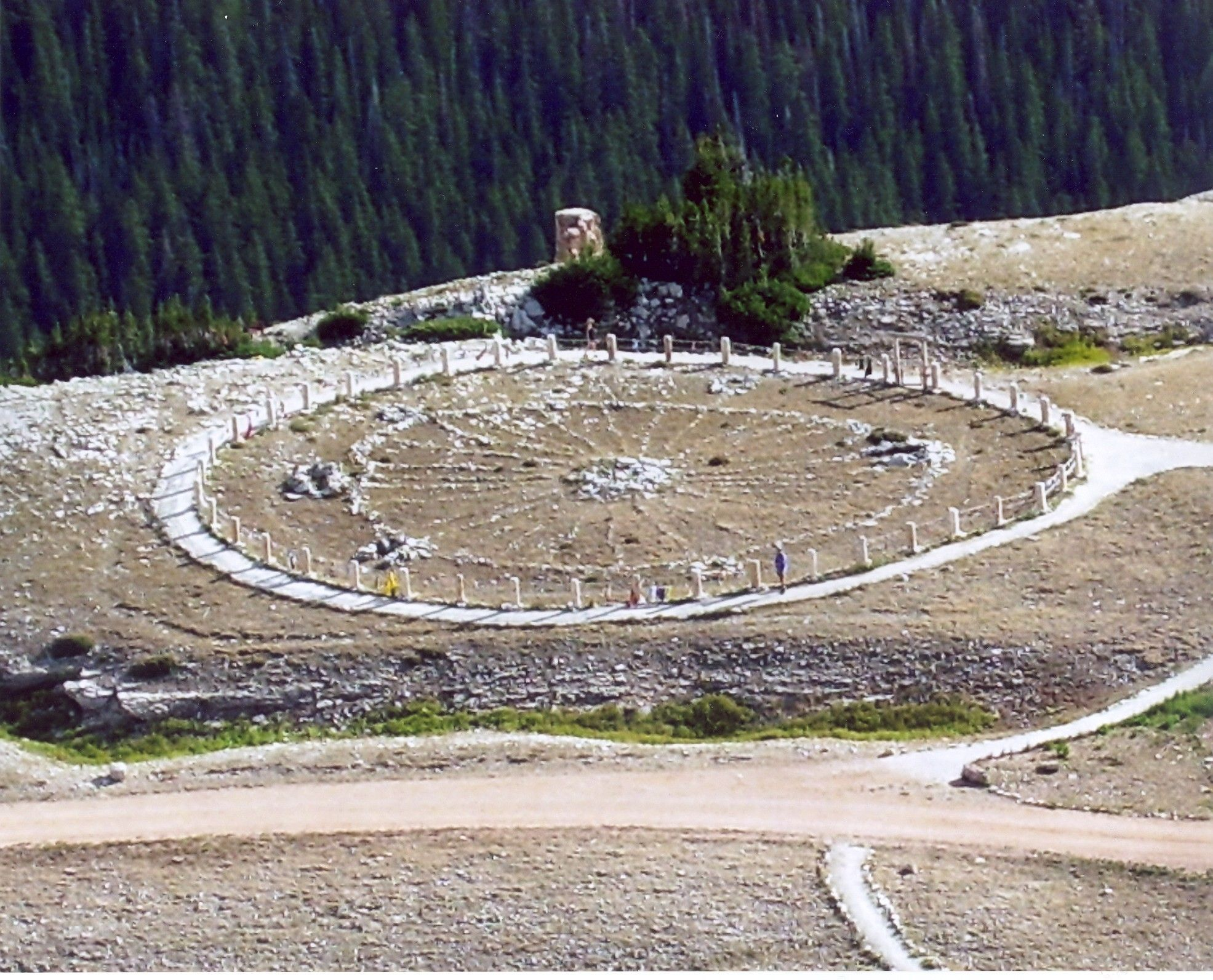
Medicine Wheel

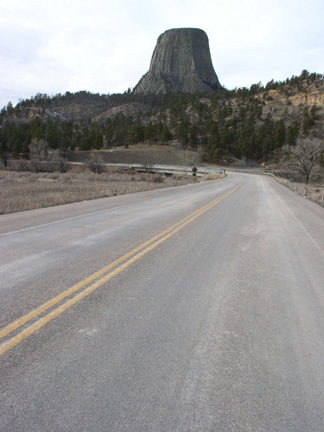
Entrance Road-Devils Tower National Monument

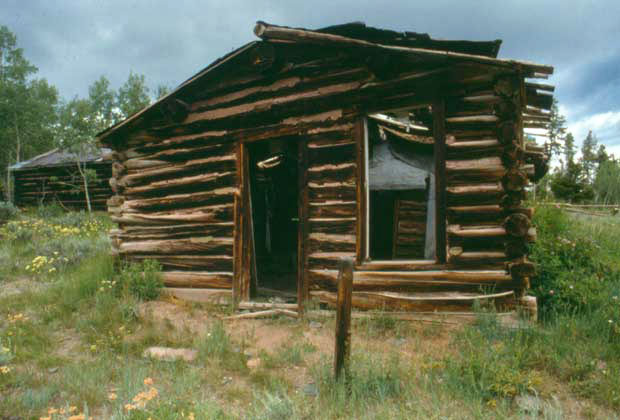
Hamilton City

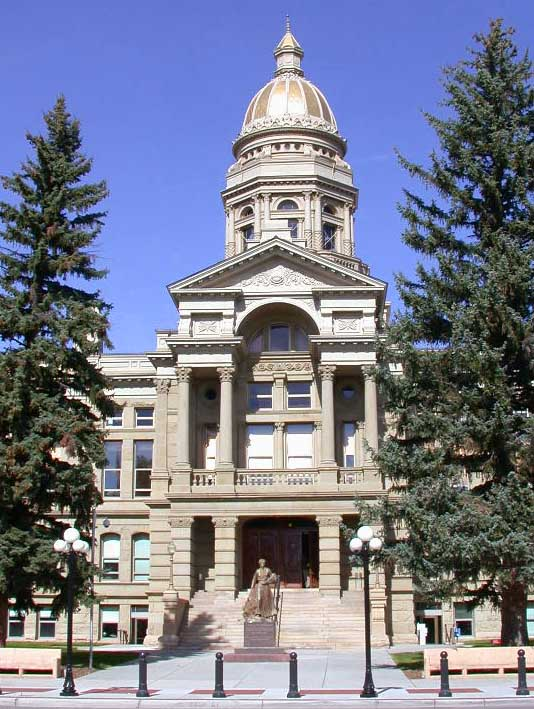
Wyoming State Capitol and Grounds

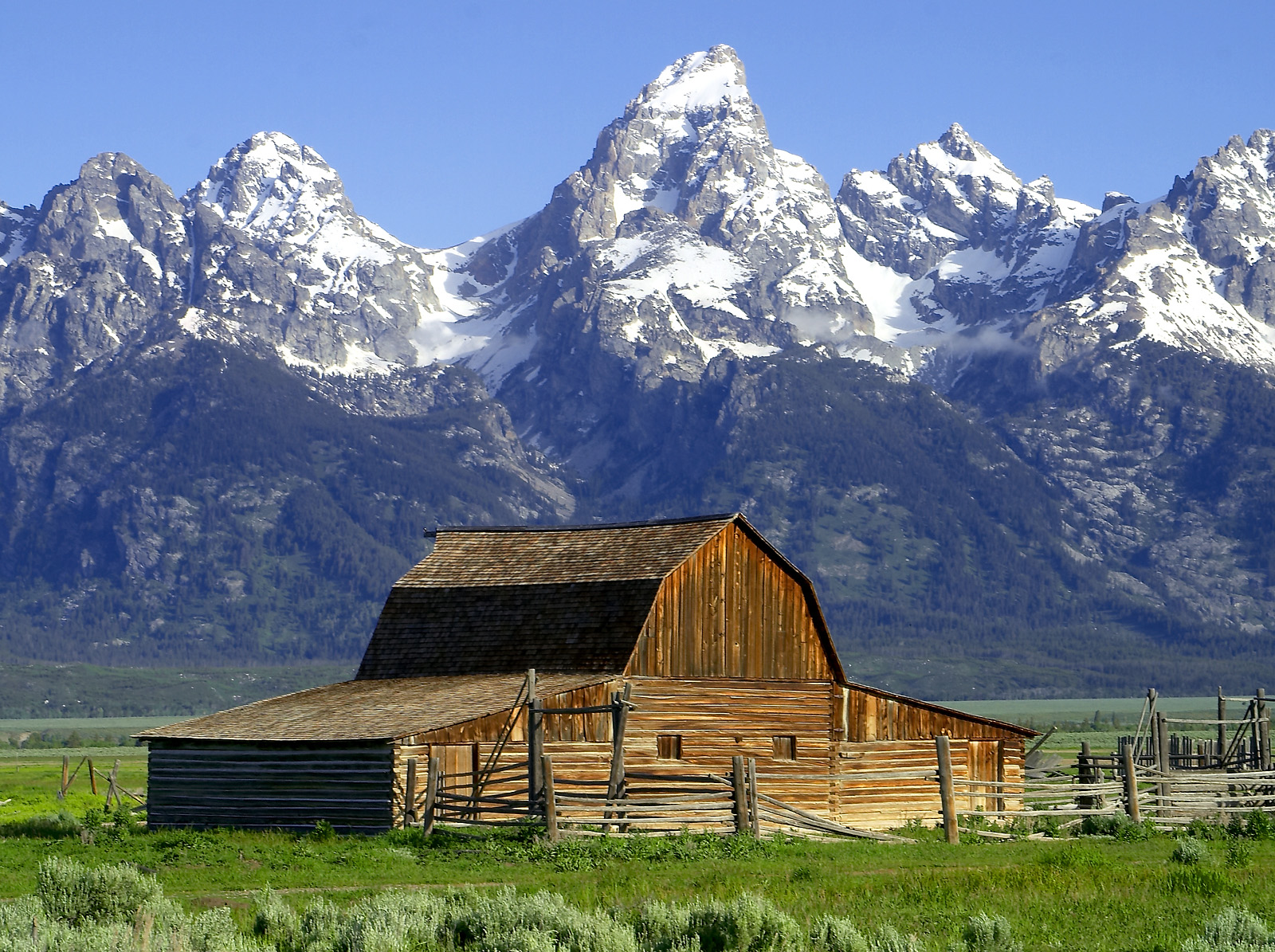
Mormon Row Historic District

	County	# of Sites
1	Albany	44
2	Big Horn	23
3	Campbell	9
4	Carbon	50
5	Converse	25
6	Crook	13
7	Fremont	37
8	Goshen	7
9	Hot Springs	11
10	Johnson	28
11	Laramie	56
12	Lincoln	13
13	Natrona	42
14	Niobrara	6
15	Park	44
16	Platte	14
17	Sheridan	31
18	Sublette	25
19	Sweetwater	37
20	Teton	68
21	Uinta	14
22	Washakie	7
23	Weston	6
(duplicates)		(6)
Total:		604

== See also ==
- List of National Historic Landmarks in Wyoming
- List of bridges on the National Register of Historic Places in Wyoming
