= Bishop Road Site =

- Bishop Road Site (48CA1612)
- U.S. National Register of Historic Places
- Nearest city: Piney, Wyoming
- NRHP reference No.: 85003202
- Added to NRHP: December 13, 1985

The Bishop Road Site in Campbell County, Wyoming is an archeological site along Piney Creek. It was discovered during surveys for a proposed coal slurry pipeline. The site contained buried lithic artifacts, bone fragments and hearths. Projectile points characteristic of the Late Archaic and Late Prehistoric periods were found, with possible early and middle Archaic points as well.
