= Sundance State Bank Building =

- Sundance State Bank
- U.S. National Register of Historic Places
- Sundance Bank in 2020

- Location within Wyoming Location within the United States
- Location: 301 Main St., Sundance, Wyoming
- Coordinates: 44°24′22″N 104°22′47″W
- Area: less than one acre
- Built: 1914
- NRHP reference No.: 84003660
- Added to NRHP: March 23, 1984

The Sundance State Bank, also known as the Bid Building, was built in 1914 on Main Street in Sundance, Wyoming. It is unusual as a stone building in an era where brick construction was more popular. It was built of local sandstone taken from nearby Reuter Canyon.

The Sundance State Bank was founded in 1888 as Stebbins, Fox & Company, becoming the Bank of Sundance, then in 1895 the Sundance State Bank. Surviving banking crises in the 1890s, the bank prospered during the agricultural boom of the first decades of the 1900s. It was able to continue on through the Great Depression.

The Sundance State Bank Building was listed on the National Register of Historic Places in 1984.
