= Entrance Station =

- Entrance Station — Devils Tower National Monument
- U.S. National Register of Historic Places
- The building in 2020

- Location within Wyoming Location within the United States
- Location: Devils Tower National Monument, Devils Tower, Wyoming
- Coordinates: 44°35′22″N 104°42′3.3″W
- Built: 1941
- Architect: W.G. Carnes
- MPS: Devils Tower National Monument MPS
- NRHP reference No.: 00000853
- Added to NRHP: July 24, 2000

The Entrance Station at Devils Tower National Monument is a log cabin in the National Park Service Rustic style, built in 1941. The cabin is based on 1933 plans created by the National Park Service Landscape Division for a now-vanished caretaker's cabin at Aspenglen Campground in Rocky Mountain National Park, adapted by NPS architect Howard W. Baker of the Branch of Plans and Design for dual use as an entrance station and as a residence. It features a unique porch with rough-cut projecting log ends in a scooped pattern.

The interior was renovated in 1999, replacing the living spaces with office space.

== See also ==
- Entrance Road-Devils Tower National Monument
- Old Headquarters Area Historic District
- Tower Ladder-Devils Tower National Monument
