= Old Headquarters Area Historic District =

Historic district in Wyoming, United States

- U.S. National Register of Historic Places
- U.S. Historic district
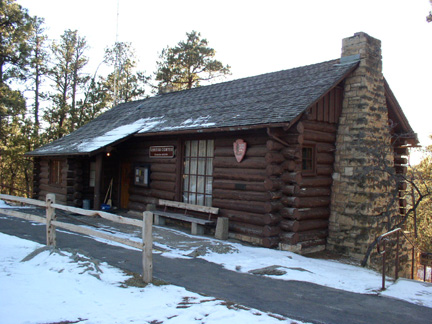
- Old Administration Building

- Location within Wyoming Location within the United States
- Location: Devils Tower National Monument, Devils Tower, Wyoming
- Coordinates: 44°35′26″N 104°43′13″W
- Built: 1931
- Architect: Edward A. Nickel
- MPS: Devils Tower National Monument MPS
- NRHP reference No.: 00000852
- Added to NRHP: July 20, 2000

The Old Headquarters Area at Devils Tower National Monument includes three structures and their surroundings, including the old headquarters building, the custodian's house, and the fire hose house. The buildings are all designed in the National Park Service Rustic style.

Funded as an Emergency Conservation Works project and built by the Civilian Conservation Corps in 1935, the old administration building was used as the monument's headquarters and museum until 1959. At that time, headquarters was relocated while the building continued its function as the park's primary visitor center. Today the main level of the building serves as the visitor center; the basement level has public restrooms, museum storage, interpreter's office, library, storage for search and rescue and first aid equipment and supplies, and a fuel oil furnace. The upper level, originally designed for use as a bedroom, is now used for storage and houses an evaporative cooler.

Custodian's Residence

The custodian's residence was designed by the NPS Landscape Division under the direction of Chief Landscape Architect Thomas Chalmers Vint and constructed in 1931 by a private contractor, a Mr. Cummings of Deadwood, South Dakota. The building first served as the residence of the monument's second custodian, George C. Crowe. The original structure had five rooms: living room, bedroom, breakfast nook kitchen, and bathroom.

Designed by the Architect Edward A. Nickel, NPS Branch of Plans and Design, and executed by the Civilian Conservation Corps (Camp NM-1, 6th Period), the fire hose house was constructed as ECW Project #17. Work was completed by August 10, 1937, "except for shelves," according to the hand-written note on the architectural plans. The fire hose house was designed and used to house the fire hydrant and to store the monument's hose and fire fighting equipment. It has been used for that purpose since 1937.

== See also ==
- Entrance Station-Devils Tower National Monument
- Entrance Road-Devils Tower National Monument
- Tower Ladder-Devils Tower National Monument
