= DXN Bridge =

- DXN Bridge over Little Missouri River
- U.S. National Register of Historic Places
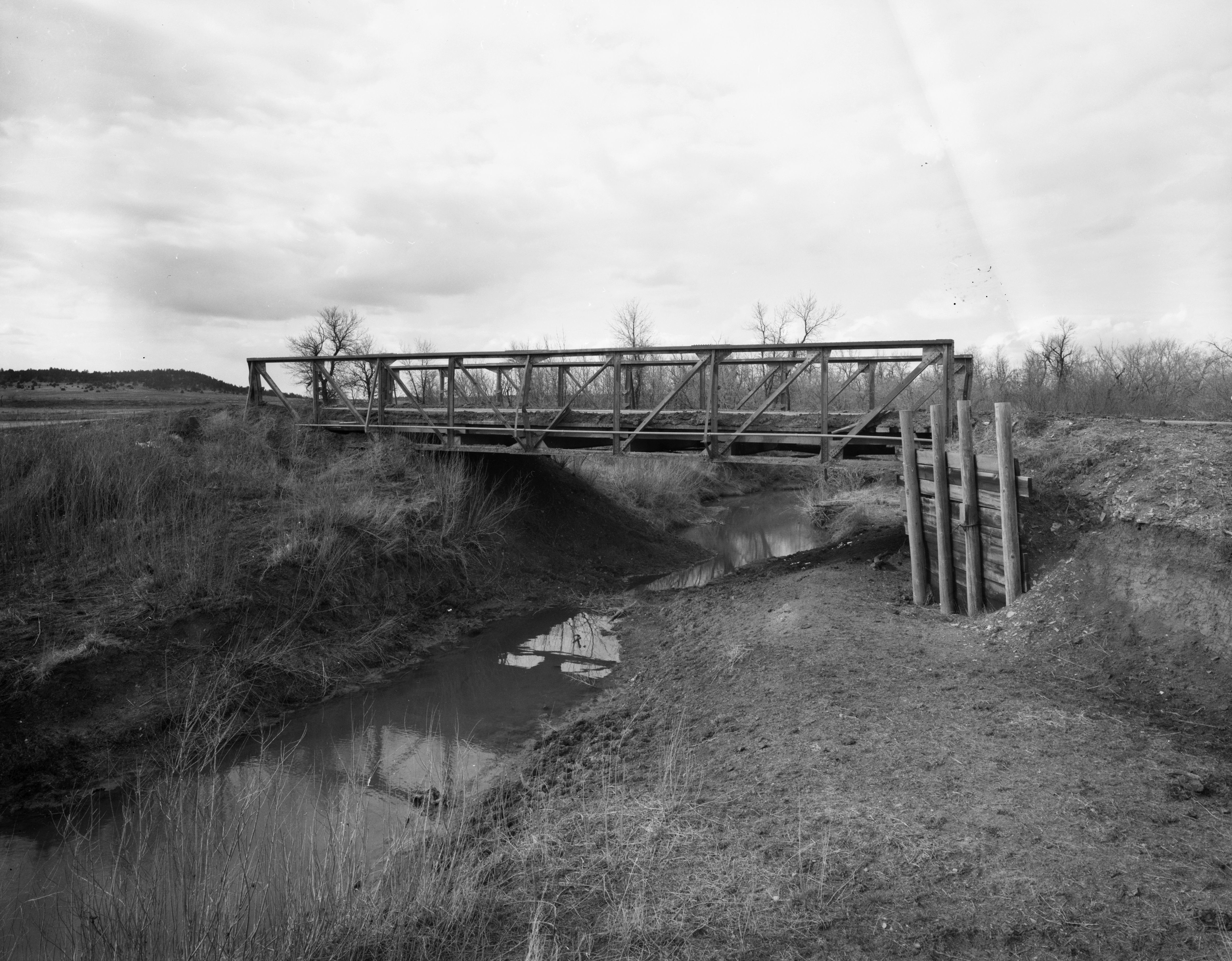

- Location within Wyoming Location within the United States
- Nearest city: Hulett, Wyoming
- Coordinates: 44°58′59″N 104°29′39″W
- Area: less than one acre
- Built: 1920
- Architectural style: Pratt pony truss
- MPS: Vehicular Truss and Arch Bridges in Wyoming TR
- NRHP reference No.: 85000419
- Added to NRHP: February 22, 1985

The DXN Bridge over the Little Missouri River is one of a group of thirty-one bridges in Wyoming that were collectively listed on the National Register of Historic Places as excellent examples of steel truss bridges of the early 20th century. The DXN Bridge is located in Crook County, Wyoming. It is a single-span of about 72 feet (22 m), an 8-bay Pratt pony truss on Crook County Road 18-200 (Little Missouri Road). It was built about 1920. The bridge is unique in lacking inclined end posts.

The Wyoming bridges were listed on the National Register of Historic Places in 1985.
