= Tower Ladder (Devils Tower National Monument) =

- Tower Ladder—Devils Tower National Monument
- U.S. National Register of Historic Places
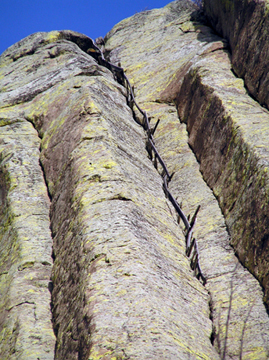

- Location within Wyoming Location within the United States
- Location: Devils Tower National Monument, Devils Tower, Wyoming
- Coordinates: 44°35′23″N 104°42′50″W
- Built: 1893
- MPS: Devils Tower National Monument MPS
- NRHP reference No.: 00000855
- Added to NRHP: July 24, 2000

The Ladder at Devils Tower was first constructed and used in 1893 by William Rogers and Willard Ripley to publicly ascend Devil's Tower. Two years later Roger's wife Linnie ascended the tower via the ladder, one of a total of about 215 who have used the ladder. The last use was by Babe "The Human Fly" White in 1927.

The present tower ladder consists of a series of wooden stakes connected on the outside by vertical wood planks. One end of each stake is driven sideways into a rock crevice, vertically ascending the southeast side of the tower. Attached with nails and/or baling wire to the other end of the stakes are 12-inch (300 mm) lengths of one-by-four-inch (25 mm × 100 mm) lumber. The ladder ascends from about 100 feet (30 m) above the ground to the summit, and is about 170 feet (50 m) long. Because of its small scale in comparison to the tower, it is very difficult to see in modern photographs, and visitors to the tower usually must view it through a telescope. The lowest 100 feet (30 m) were removed in the 1930s as a safety measure. The remaining ladder was restored in 1972.

== See also ==
- Entrance Road-Devils Tower National Monument
- Entrance Station-Devils Tower National Monument
- Old Headquarters Area Historic District
