= Devils Tower =

Flat-topped volcanic plug in Wyoming, US

Devils Tower Bear Lodge
- Matȟó Thípila (Lakota), Daxpitcheeaasáao (Crow)
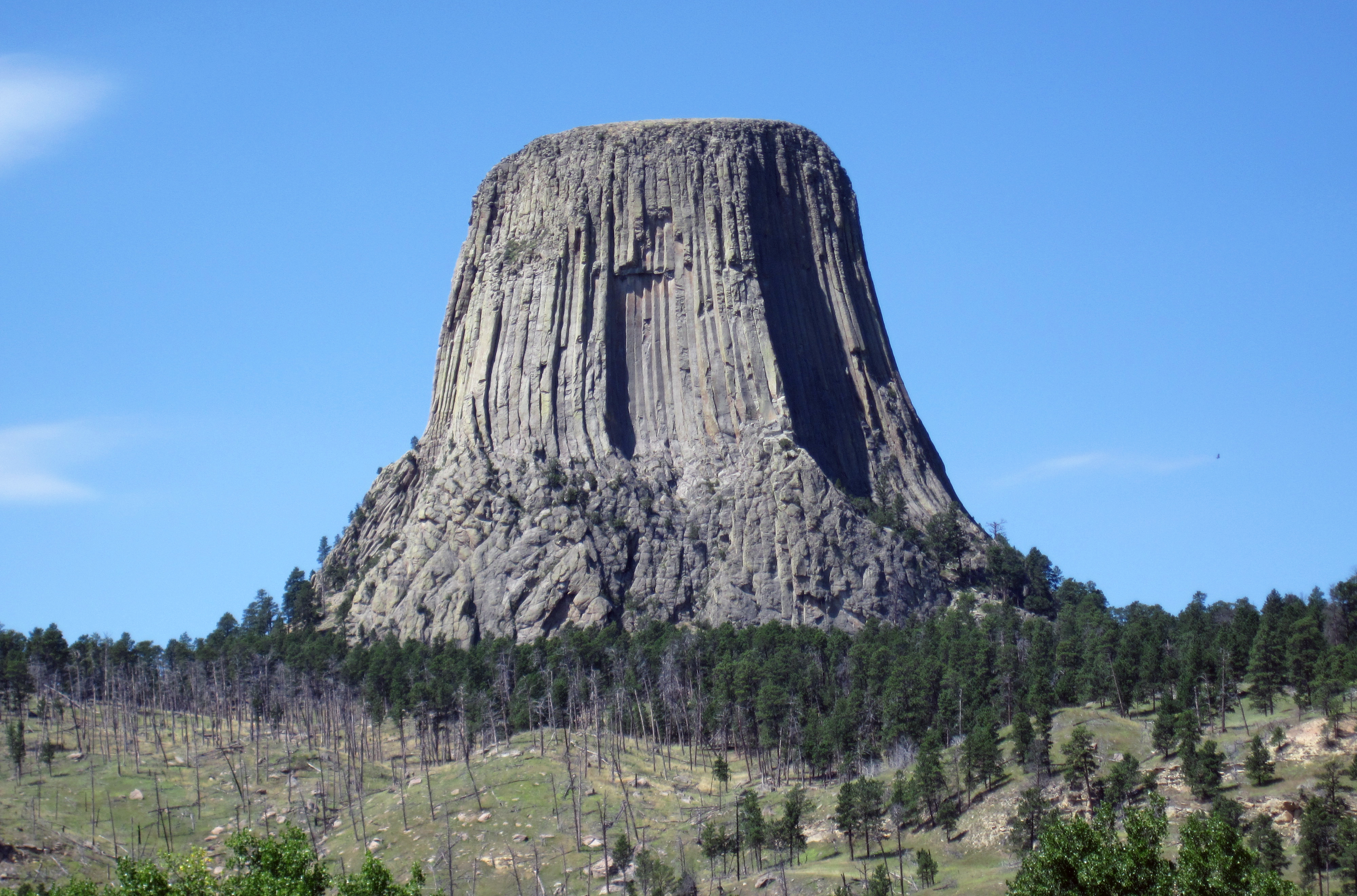

Highest point
- Elevation: 5,112 ft (1,558 m) NAVD 88
- Coordinates: 44°35′26″N 104°42′55″W

Geography
- Location: Crook County, Wyoming, United States
- Parent range: Bear Lodge Mountains, part of the Black Hills
- Topo map: USGS Devils Tower

Geology
- Mountain type: Laccolith

Climbing
- First ascent: William Rogers and Willard Ripley, July 4, 1893
- Easiest route: Durrance Route

Devils Tower National Monument
- IUCN category III (natural monument or feature)
- Location within the United States Location within Wyoming
- Nearest city: Hulett, Wyoming
- Coordinates: 44°35′26″N 104°42′55″W
- Area: 1,346 acres (5.45 km^{2})
- Established: September 24, 1906; 120 years ago
- Visitors: 515,303 (in 2025)
- Governing body: National Park Service
- Website: Devils Tower National Monument

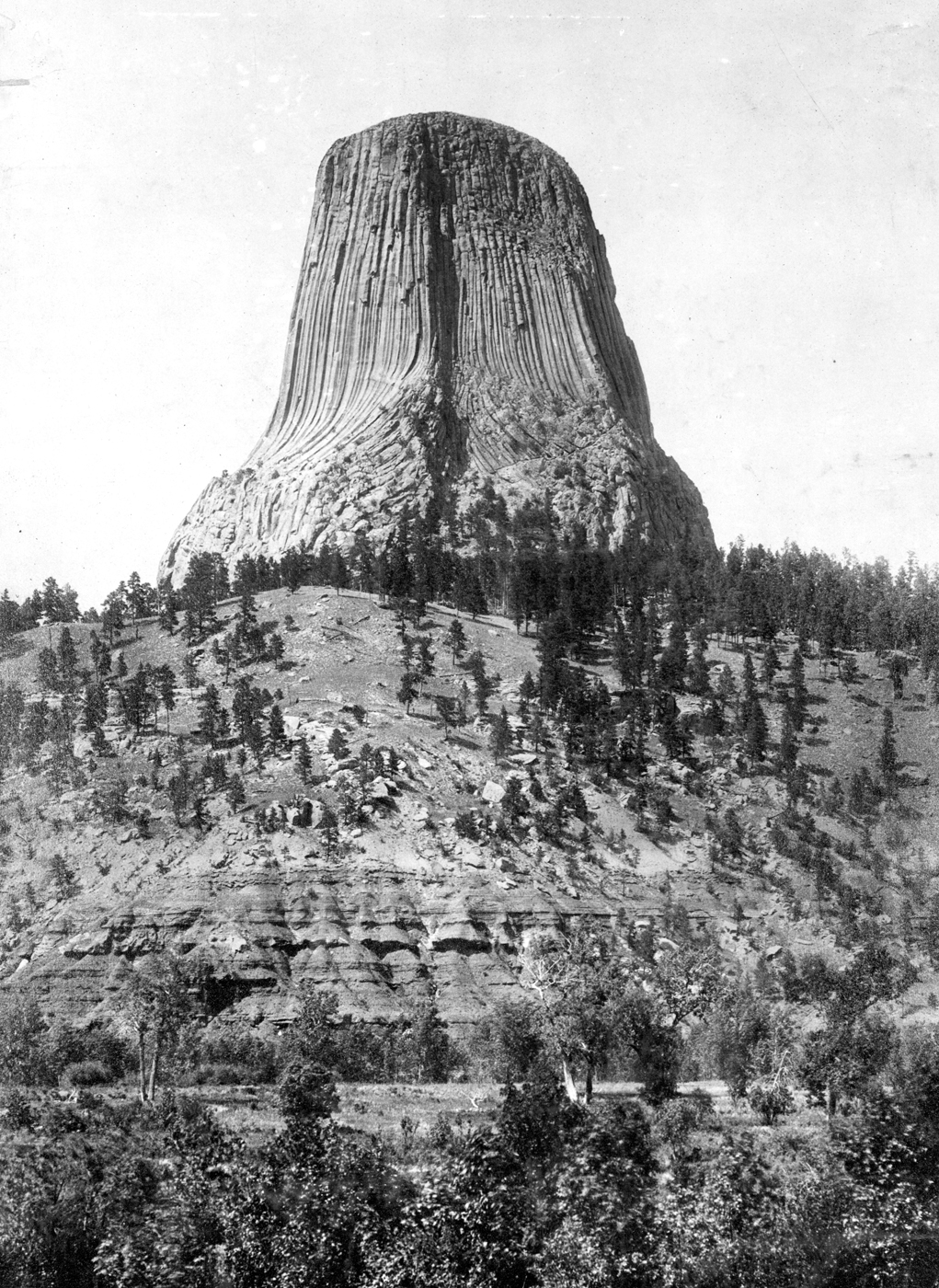
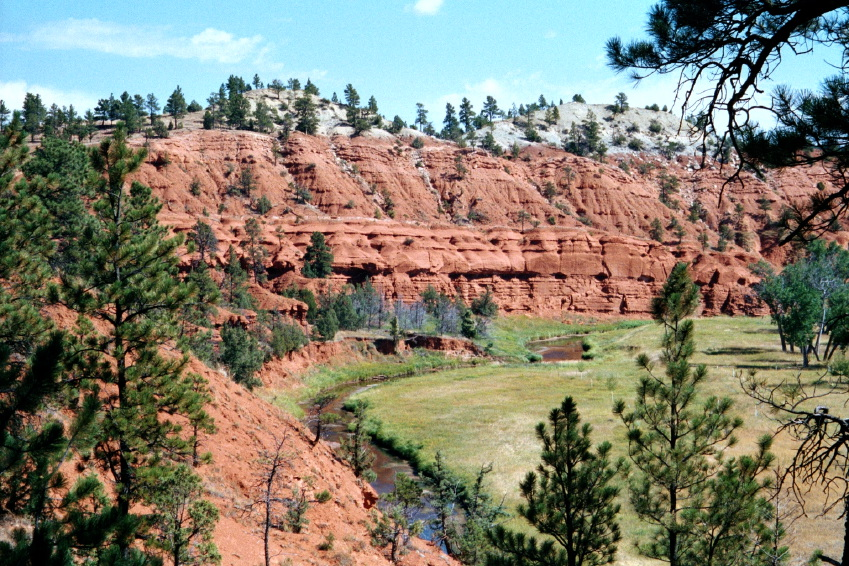
Devils Tower in 1900 (left) and red sandstone and siltstone cliffs above the Belle Fourche River (right)

Devils Tower (also known as Matȟó Thípila or Bear Lodge) is a laccolithic butte, composed of igneous rock in the Bear Lodge Ranger District of the Black Hills, near Hulett and Sundance in Crook County, northeastern Wyoming, above the Belle Fourche River. It rises 1,267 feet (386 m) above the river, standing 867 ft (264 m) from summit to base. The summit is 5,112 ft (1,558 m) above sea level.

Devils Tower National Monument was the first United States national monument, established on September 24, 1906, by President Theodore Roosevelt. The monument's boundary encloses an area of 1,347 acres (545 ha).

== Name ==
Indigenous names for the monolith include Bear's House or Bear's Lodge (or Bear's Tipi, Home of the Bear, Bear's Lair); Cheyenne, Lakota: Matȟó Thípila, Crow: Daxpitcheeaasáao (Home of Bears), Kiowa: Ts’òâi (Aloft on a Rock), Tree Rock, Great Gray Horn, and Brown Buffalo Horn (Lakota: Ptehé Ǧí).

The name "Devil's Tower" originated in 1875 during an expedition led by Colonel Richard Irving Dodge, when his interpreter reportedly misinterpreted a native name to mean "Bad God's Tower". All information signs in that area use the name "Devils Tower", following a geographic naming standard whereby the apostrophe is omitted.

In 2005, a proposal to recognize several indigenous ties through the additional designation of the monolith as Bear Lodge National Historic Landmark was opposed by United States Representative Barbara Cubin, arguing that a "name change will harm the tourist trade and bring economic hardship to area communities". In November 2014, Arvol Looking Horse proposed renaming the geographical feature "Bear Lodge" and submitted the request to the United States Board on Geographic Names. A second proposal was submitted to request that the U.S. acknowledge what it described as the "offensive" mistake in keeping the current name and to rename the monument and sacred site into Bear Lodge National Historic Landmark. The formal public comment period ended in fall 2015. Local state senator Ogden Driskill opposed the change. The name was not changed.

== Geology ==
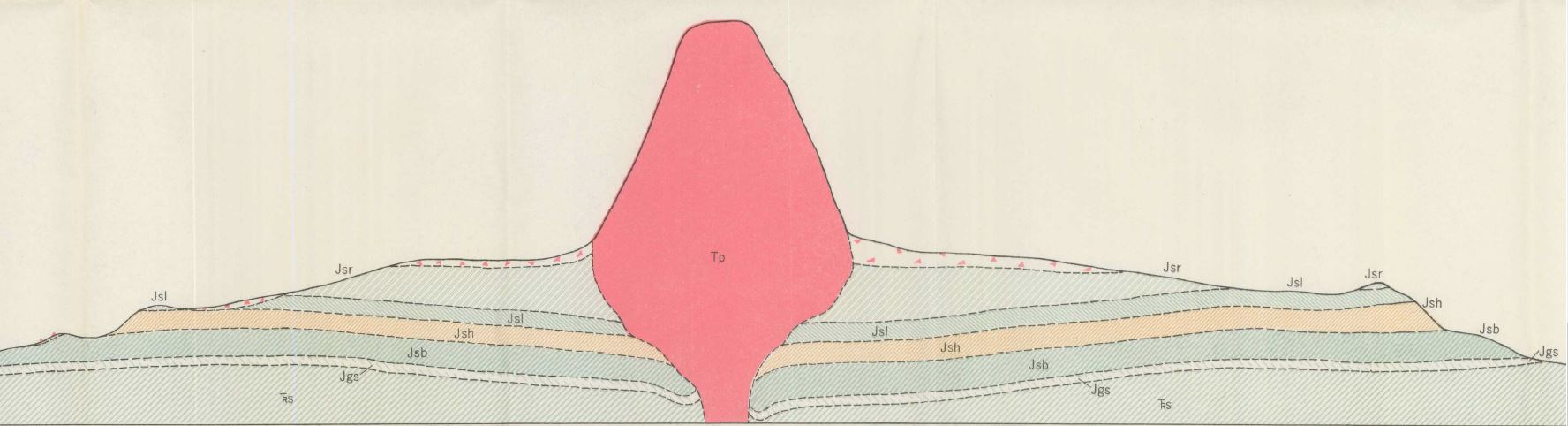
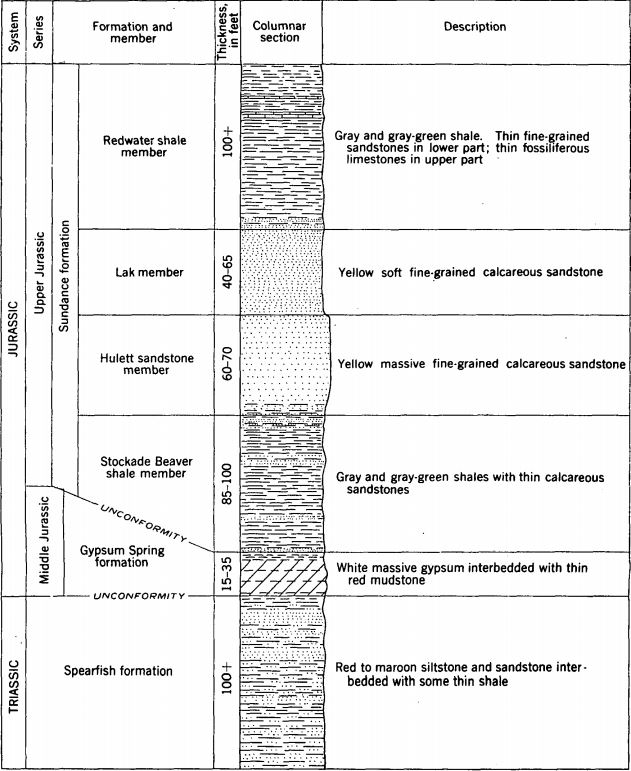
Geologic cross-section (left) and stratigraphic column (right)
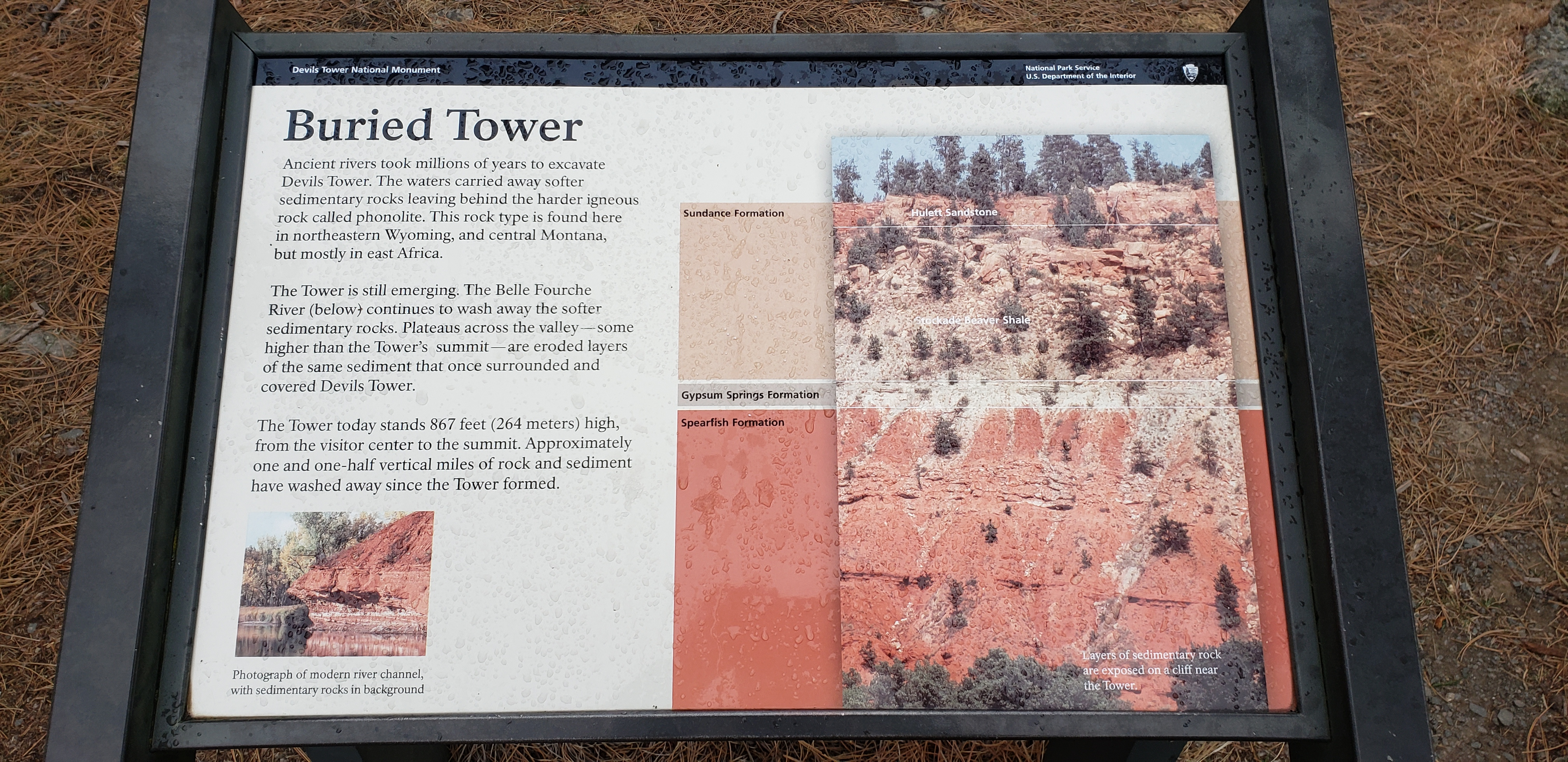
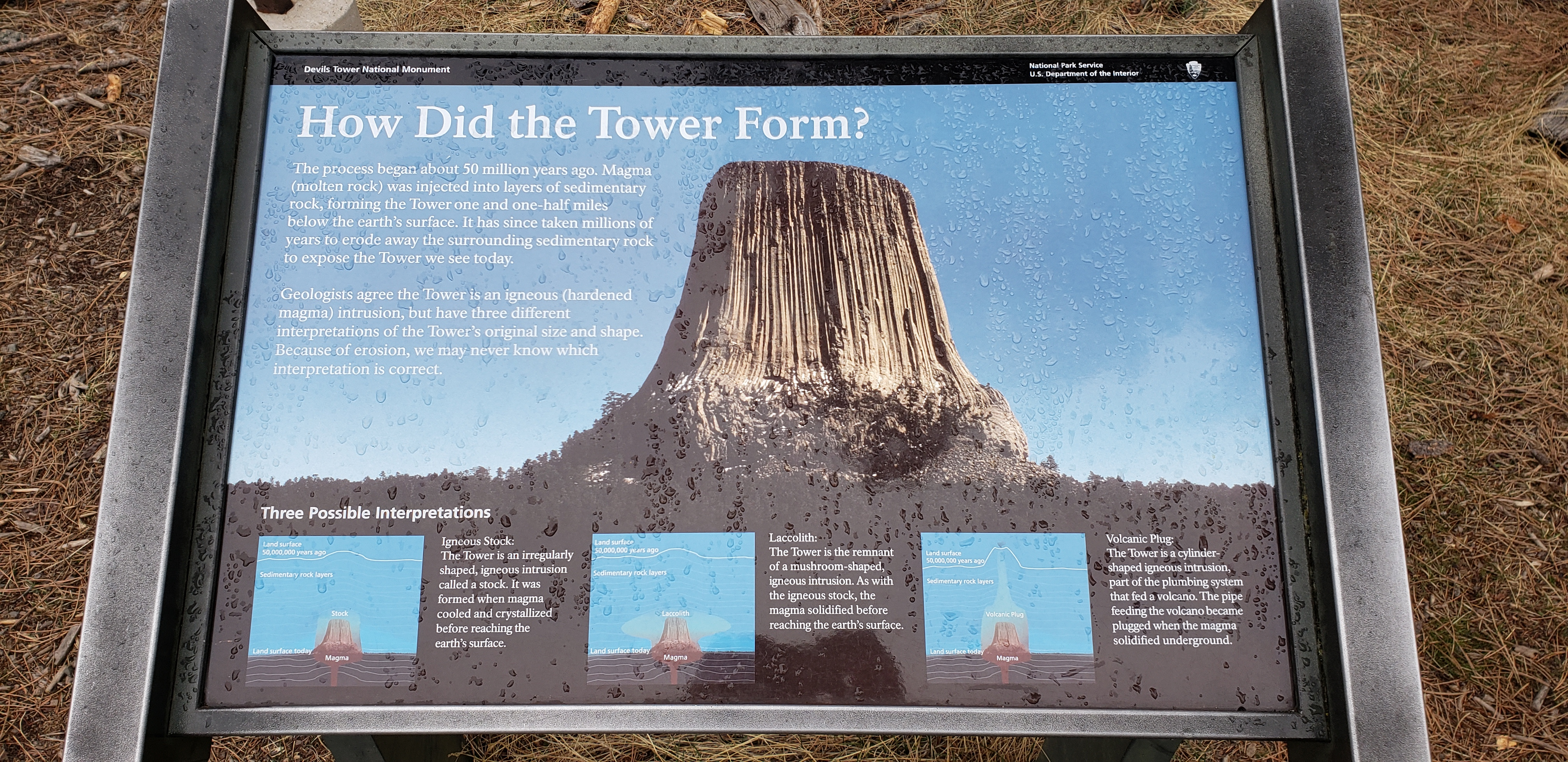
National monument markers depicting the sedimentary rocks in the area (left) and three theories explaining the origin of the igneous rocks (right)
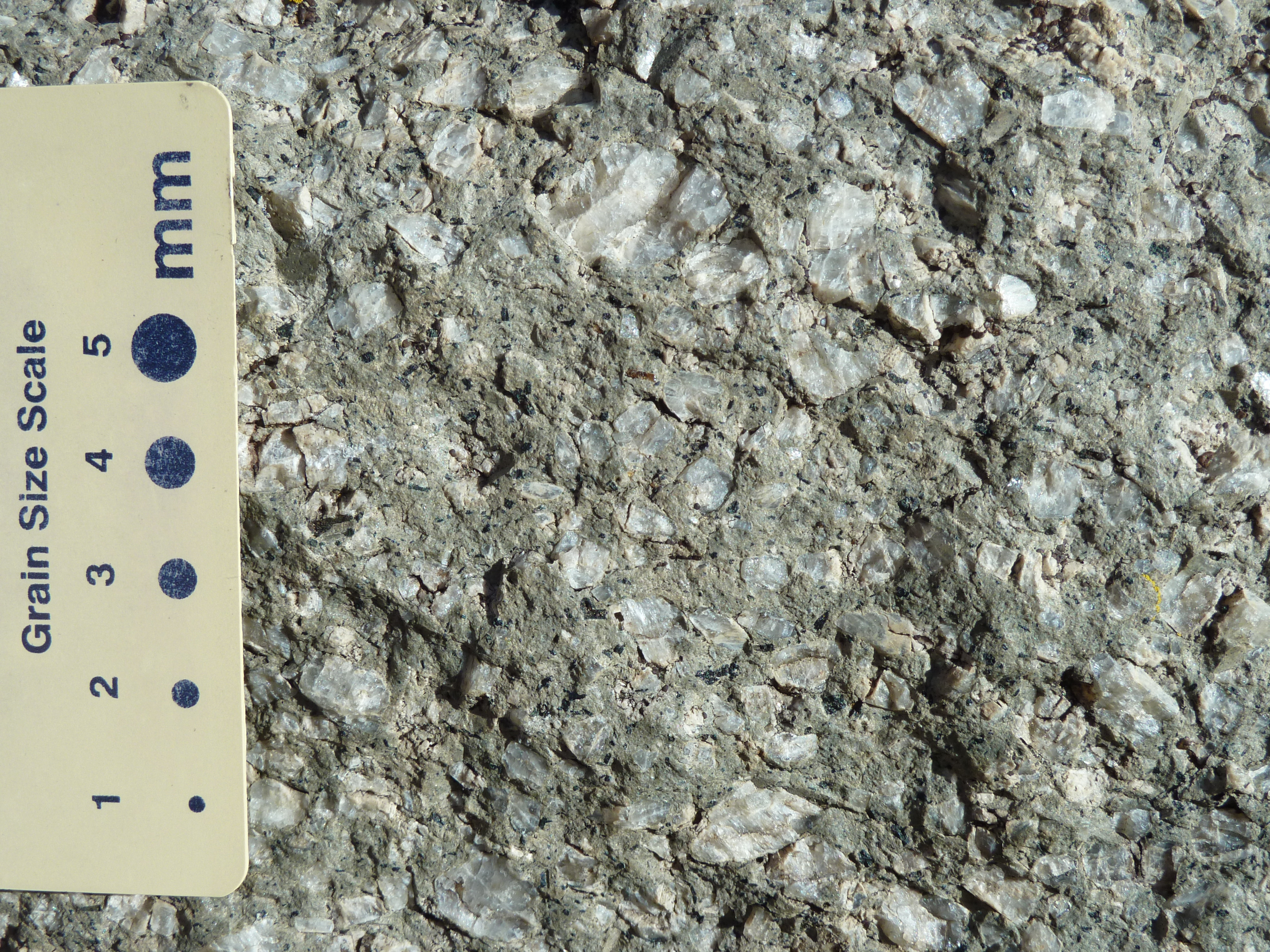
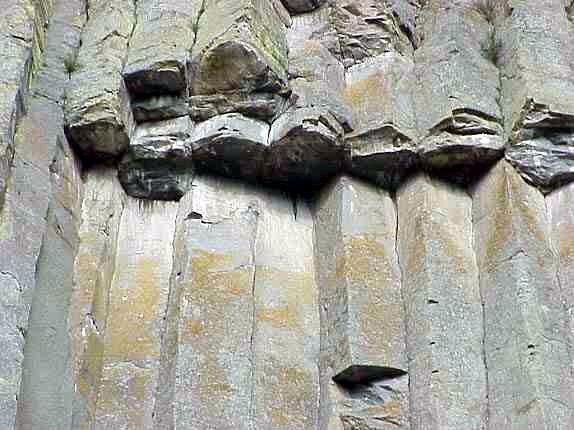
Devils Tower is composed of a porphyritic phonolite (left) - close-up view of the columns (right).

The landscape surrounding Devils Tower is composed mostly of sedimentary rocks. The oldest rocks visible in Devils Tower National Monument were laid down in a shallow sea during the Triassic. This dark red sandstone and maroon siltstone, interbedded with shale, can be seen along the Belle Fourche River. Oxidation of iron minerals causes the redness of the rocks. This rock layer is known as the Spearfish Formation. Above the formation is a thin band of white gypsum, called the Gypsum Springs Formation, Jurassic in age. Overlying this formation is the Sundance Formation. During the Paleocene Epoch, 56 to 66 million years ago, the Rocky Mountains and the Black Hills were lifted up. Magma rose through the crust, intruding into the existing sedimentary rock layers.

Geologists Carpenter and Russell studied Devils Tower in the late 19th century and came to the conclusion that it was formed by an igneous intrusion. In 1907, geologists Nelson Horatio Darton and C.C. O'Harra (of the South Dakota School of Mines) theorized that Devils Tower must be an eroded remnant of a laccolith.

The igneous material that forms the tower is a phonolite porphyry intruded about 40.5 million years ago, a light- to dark-gray or greenish-gray igneous rock with conspicuous crystals of white feldspar. As the magma cooled, hexagonal columns formed (though sometimes four-, five-, and seven-sided columns were possible), up to 20 ft (6.1 m) wide and 600 ft (180 m) tall.

As rain and snow continue to erode the sedimentary rocks surrounding the tower's base, more of Devils Tower will be exposed. Nonetheless, the exposed portions of the tower still experience erosion. Cracks along the columns are subject to water and ice erosion. Portions, or even entire columns, of rock at Devils Tower are continually breaking off and falling. Piles of broken columns, boulders, small rocks, and stones, called scree, lie at the base of the tower, indicating that it was once wider than it is today.

The geologically related Missouri Buttes are located 3.5 mi (5.6 km) northwest of Devils Tower.

== Climate ==
Climate data for Devils Tower #2, Wyoming, 1991–2020 normals, extremes 1932–present (Note: DEVILS TOWER 1932–1958, DEVILS TOWER NO 2 1959–PRESENT): 3862 ft (1177 m)
Month	Jan	Feb	Mar	Apr	May	Jun	Jul	Aug	Sep	Oct	Nov	Dec	Year
Record high °F (°C)	65 (18)	71 (22)	86 (30)	90 (32)	97 (36)	105 (41)	109 (43)	106 (41)	103 (39)	92 (33)	80 (27)	67 (19)	109 (43)
Mean maximum °F (°C)	51.9 (11.1)	54.7 (12.6)	69.8 (21.0)	79.1 (26.2)	85.4 (29.7)	91.5 (33.1)	97.2 (36.2)	96.4 (35.8)	92.8 (33.8)	82.7 (28.2)	67.6 (19.8)	53.9 (12.2)	99.0 (37.2)
Mean daily maximum °F (°C)	34.2 (1.2)	36.9 (2.7)	47.4 (8.6)	56.6 (13.7)	65.8 (18.8)	76.3 (24.6)	85.3 (29.6)	84.6 (29.2)	74.7 (23.7)	59.5 (15.3)	45.2 (7.3)	35.4 (1.9)	58.5 (14.7)
Daily mean °F (°C)	21.0 (−6.1)	23.8 (−4.6)	34.1 (1.2)	42.8 (6.0)	52.4 (11.3)	62.5 (16.9)	70.0 (21.1)	68.5 (20.3)	58.4 (14.7)	45.0 (7.2)	32.1 (0.1)	22.4 (−5.3)	44.4 (6.9)
Mean daily minimum °F (°C)	7.8 (−13.4)	10.8 (−11.8)	20.8 (−6.2)	28.9 (−1.7)	39.1 (3.9)	48.7 (9.3)	54.7 (12.6)	52.4 (11.3)	42.1 (5.6)	30.4 (−0.9)	18.9 (−7.3)	9.3 (−12.6)	30.3 (−0.9)
Mean minimum °F (°C)	−17.5 (−27.5)	−14.0 (−25.6)	−3.3 (−19.6)	10.8 (−11.8)	22.5 (−5.3)	34.7 (1.5)	42.6 (5.9)	38.8 (3.8)	27.3 (−2.6)	12.3 (−10.9)	−3.5 (−19.7)	−13.1 (−25.1)	−25.9 (−32.2)
Record low °F (°C)	−41 (−41)	−44 (−42)	−32 (−36)	−12 (−24)	11 (−12)	26 (−3)	31 (−1)	29 (−2)	14 (−10)	−20 (−29)	−35 (−37)	−48 (−44)	−48 (−44)
Average precipitation inches (mm)	0.72 (18)	0.76 (19)	1.13 (29)	1.98 (50)	2.93 (74)	3.22 (82)	2.14 (54)	1.90 (48)	1.32 (34)	1.53 (39)	0.78 (20)	0.68 (17)	19.09 (484)
Average snowfall inches (cm)	8.8 (22)	9.3 (24)	7.3 (19)	5.3 (13)	0.4 (1.0)	0.0 (0.0)	0.0 (0.0)	0.0 (0.0)	0.0 (0.0)	1.8 (4.6)	6.3 (16)	9.6 (24)	48.8 (123.6)
Average precipitation days (≥ 0.01 in)	7.8	8.0	6.9	9.0	11.4	10.9	8.3	6.3	6.5	7.2	5.6	6.3	94.2
Average snowy days (≥ 0.1 in)	6.7	7.1	4.4	2.3	0.3	0.0	0.0	0.0	0.1	1.3	3.6	5.8	31.6
Source 1: NOAA
Source 2: XMACIS (records & monthly max/mins)

== Native American cultural beliefs ==
Devils Tower inspired many geomyths.

According to the traditional beliefs of Native American peoples, the Kiowa and Lakota, several girls went out to play and were spotted by several giant bears that began to chase them. To escape the bears, the girls climbed atop a rock, fell to their knees, and prayed to the Great Spirit to save them. Hearing their prayers, the Great Spirit made the rock rise from the ground towards the heavens so that the bears could not reach the girls. The bears, to climb the rock, left deep claw marks in the sides, which had become too steep to climb. Those marks appear today on the sides of Devils Tower. When the girls reached the sky, they were turned into the stars of the Pleiades.

Another version tells that two Sioux boys wandered far from their village when Mato the bear, a huge creature that had claws the size of tipi poles, spotted them, and wanted to eat them for breakfast. He was almost upon them when the boys prayed to Wakan Tanka the Creator to help them. They rose up on a huge rock, while Mato tried to get up from every side, leaving huge scratch marks as he did. Finally, he sauntered off, disappointed and discouraged. The bear came to rest east of the Black Hills at what is now Bear Butte. Wanblee, the eagle, helped the boys off the rock and back to their village. A painting depicting this legend by artist Herbert A. Collins hangs over the fireplace in the visitor center at Devils Tower.

In a Cheyenne version of the story, the giant bear pursues the girls and kills most of them. Two sisters escape back to their home with the bear still tracking them. They tell two boys that the bear can only be killed with an arrow shot through the underside of its foot. The boys have the sisters lead the bear to Devils Tower and trick it into thinking they have climbed the rock. The boys attempt to shoot the bear through the foot while it repeatedly attempts to climb up and slides back down, leaving more claw marks each time. The bear was finally scared off when an arrow came very close to its left foot. This last arrow continued to go up and never came down.

Wooden Leg, a Northern Cheyenne, recounted another legend told to him by an old man while they were traveling together past Devils Tower around 1866–1868. An indigenous man decided to sleep at the base of Bear Lodge next to a buffalo head. In the morning, he discovered that both the buffalo head and he had been transported to the top of the rock by the Great Medicine, with no way to descend. He spent another day and night on the rock without food or water. After praying all day and then going to sleep, he awoke to find that the Great Medicine had brought him back down to the ground, but had left the buffalo head at the top near the edge. Wooden Leg asserted that the buffalo head was clearly visible through the old man's spyglass. At that time, the tower had never been climbed, and a buffalo head at the top was otherwise inexplicable. The buffalo head gives this story special significance for the Northern Cheyenne. All the Cheyenne maintained in their camps a sacred tipi to the Great Medicine containing the tribal sacred objects. In the case of the Northern Cheyenne, the sacred object was a buffalo head.

N. Scott Momaday (Kiowa) was given the name Tsoai-talee (Rock Tree Boy) by Pohd-lohk, a Kiowa elder, linking the child to the Devils Tower bear myth. To reinforce this mythic connection, his parents took him there. Momaday incorporated the bear myth as unifying subtext into his 1989 novel The Ancient Child.

== U.S. history ==
Fur trappers may have visited Devils Tower, but they left no written evidence of having done so. The first documented nonindigenous visitors were members of Captain William F. Raynolds's 1859 expedition to Yellowstone. Sixteen years later, Colonel Richard I. Dodge escorted an Office of Indian Affairs scientific survey party to the massive rock formation and coined the name Devils Tower. Recognizing its unique characteristics, the United States Congress designated the area a U.S. forest reserve in 1892, and in 1906, Devils Tower became the nation's first national monument.

== Climbing ==
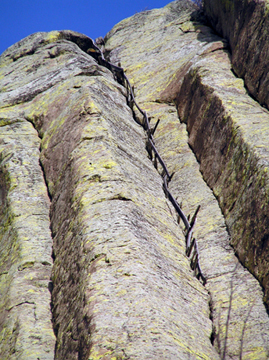
Old climbing ladder on Devils Tower (left) and a climber on the tower (right)

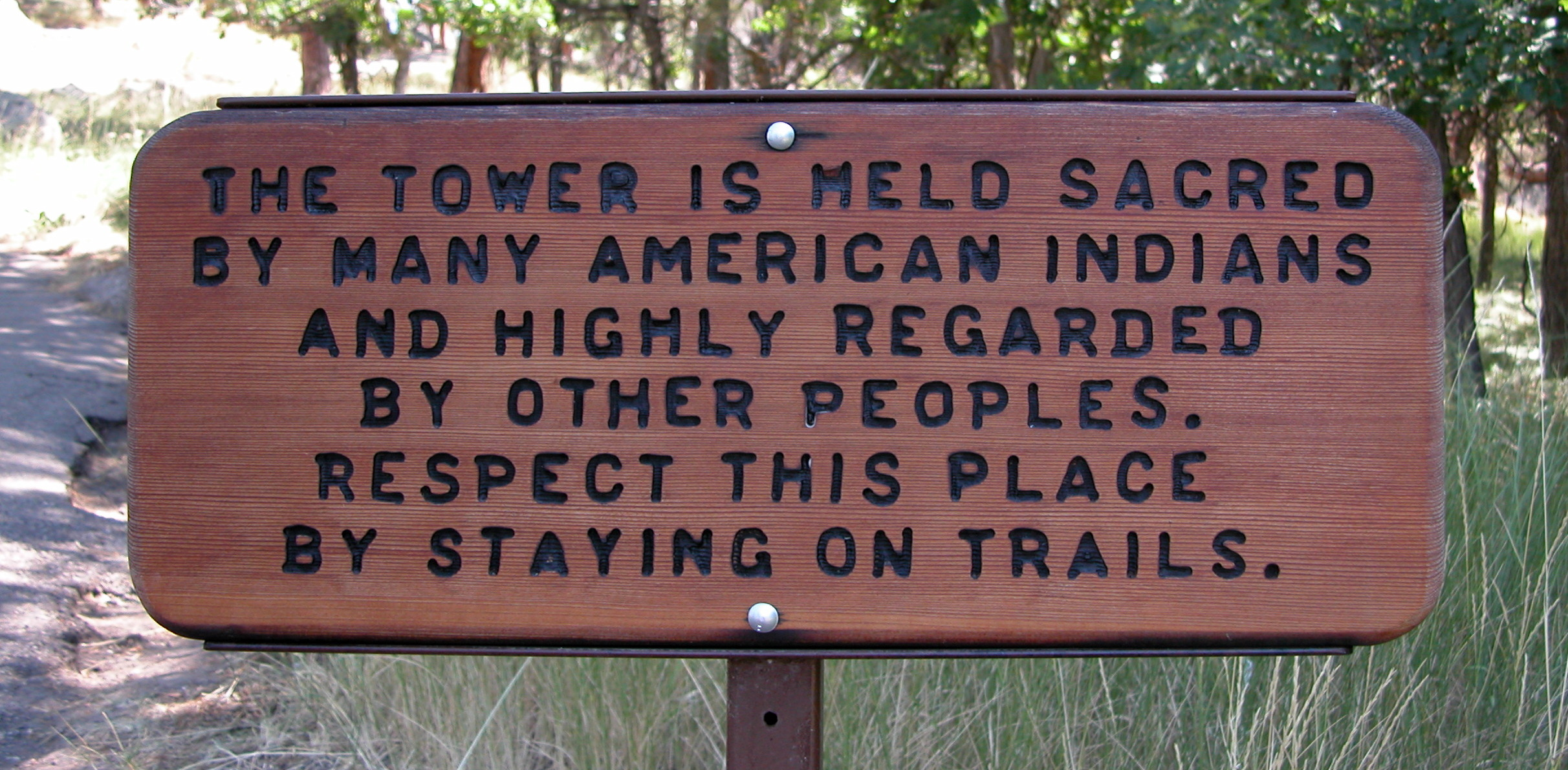
A sign informs visitors of the site's Native American heritage.

As of 1994, climbing Devils Tower had increased in popularity. About 1.3% of the monument's 400,000 annual visitors climbed Devils Tower, mostly using traditional climbing techniques. The first known ascent of Devils Tower by any method occurred on July 4, 1893, and is credited to William Rogers and Willard Ripley, local ranchers in the area. They completed this first ascent after constructing a ladder of wooden pegs driven into cracks in the rock face. A few of these wooden pegs are still intact and are visible on the tower when hiked along the 1.3-mile (2.1 km) Tower Trail at Devils Tower National Monument. Over the following 30 years, many climbs were made by this ladder before it fell into disrepair.

The first ascent using modern climbing techniques was made by Fritz Wiessner, with William P. House and Lawrence Coveney in 1937. Wiessner led almost the entire climb free, placing only a single piece of fixed gear, a piton, which he later regretted, deeming it unnecessary.

In 1941, George Hopkins parachuted onto Devils Tower, without permission, as a publicity stunt resulting from a bet. He had intended to descend by a 1,000-foot (300 m) rope dropped to him after successfully landing on the butte, but the package containing the rope, a sledgehammer, and a car axle to be driven into the rock as an anchor point, slid over the edge. As the weather deteriorated, a second attempt was made to drop equipment, but Hopkins deemed it unusable after the rope became snarled and frozen by rain and wind. Hopkins was stranded for six days, exposed to cold, rain, and 50 mph (80 km/h) winds before a mountain rescue team led by Jack Durrance, who had successfully climbed Devils Tower in 1938, finally reached him and brought him down. His entrapment and rescue were widely covered by the news media.

Today, hundreds of climbers scale the sheer rock walls of Devils Tower each summer. Most common is the Durrance Route, which was the second free-climbing route, established in 1938. Many established and documented climbing routes cover every side of the tower, ascending the various vertical cracks and columns of the rock. The difficulty of these routes ranges from relatively easy to some of the most challenging in the world. All climbers are required to register with a park ranger before and after attempting a climb. No overnight camping at the summit is allowed; climbers must return to base on the same day they ascend.

The tower is sacred to several Plains tribes, including the Lakota, Cheyenne, and Kiowa. Because of this, many Native American leaders object to climbers ascending the monument, considering this to be a desecration. The climbers have argued that they have a right to climb the tower, since it is on federal land. A compromise eventually reached enacted a voluntary climbing ban during June, when the tribes conduct ceremonies around the monument and climbers are asked, but not required, to stay off the tower. According to the PBS documentary In the Light of Reverence, about 85% of climbers honor the ban and voluntarily choose not to climb the tower during June, but several climbers along with the Mountain States Legal Foundation, have sued the Park Service, claiming an inappropriate government entanglement with religion.

=== Incidents ===
Seven people have died climbing Devils Tower in the park's 119-year history. Rescues of stranded and underequipped climbers on the formation are common. The most recent fatality was in September 2024, when a climber fell to his death while descending, leaving his climbing partner stranded without a rope on the face of the tower until help arrived.

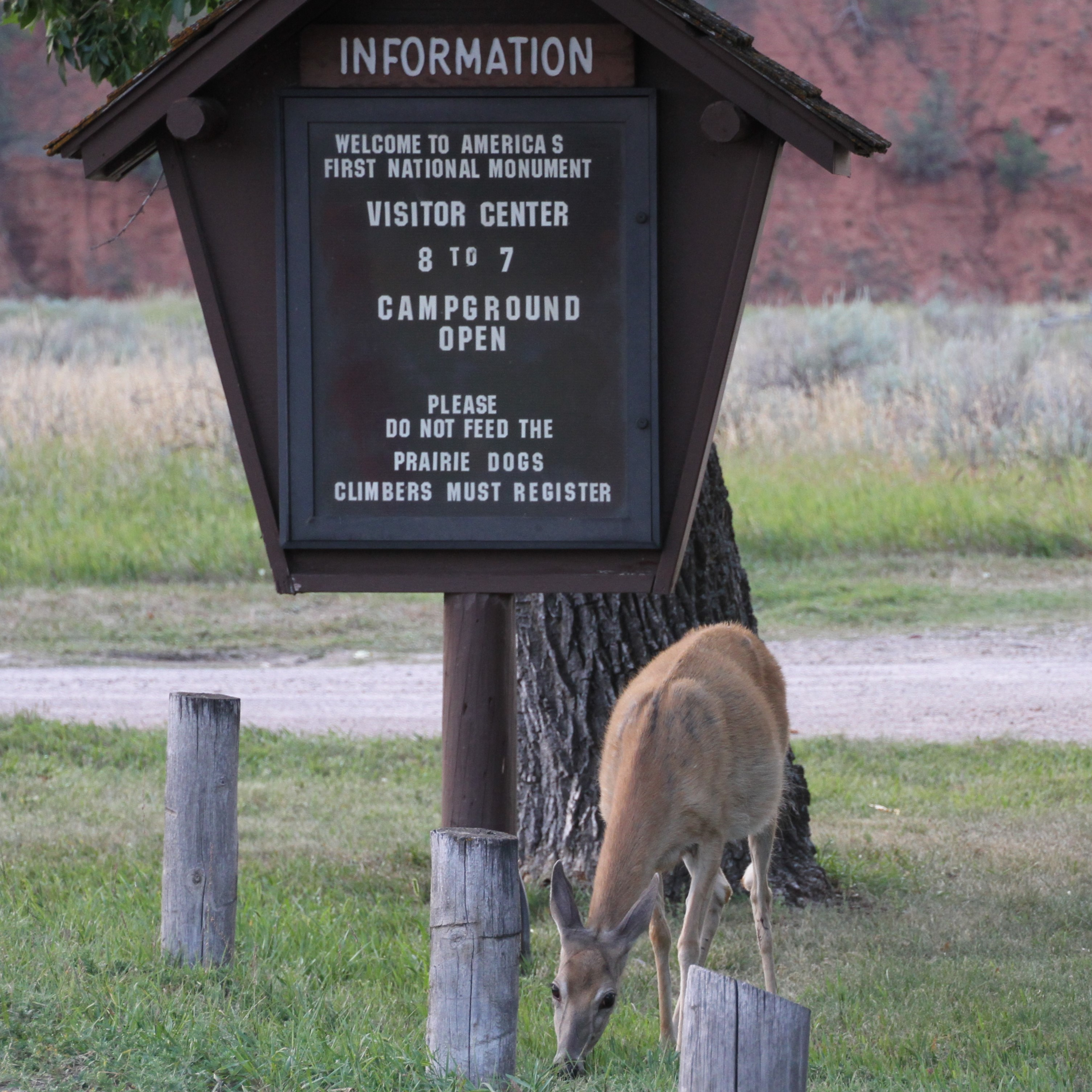
Deer grazing at the national monument entrance

== Wildlife ==
Devils Tower National Monument protects many species of wildlife, such as white-tailed deer, prairie dogs, and bald eagles.

== In popular culture ==
The 1977 movie Close Encounters of the Third Kind used the formation as a plot element and as the location of its climactic scenes. The film's popularity resulted in a large increase in visitors to the monument and climbers of it.

== National Register of Historic Places ==
Four areas of Devils Tower National Monument are on the National Register of Historic Places:

- Entrance Road
- Entrance Station
- Old Headquarters Area Historic District
- Tower Ladder

== See also ==
- Cabezon Peak
- Elephant Butte
- List of national monuments of the United States
- Shiprock
