= Gillette City Hall =

- Gillette City Hall (1936)
- U.S. National Register of Historic Places
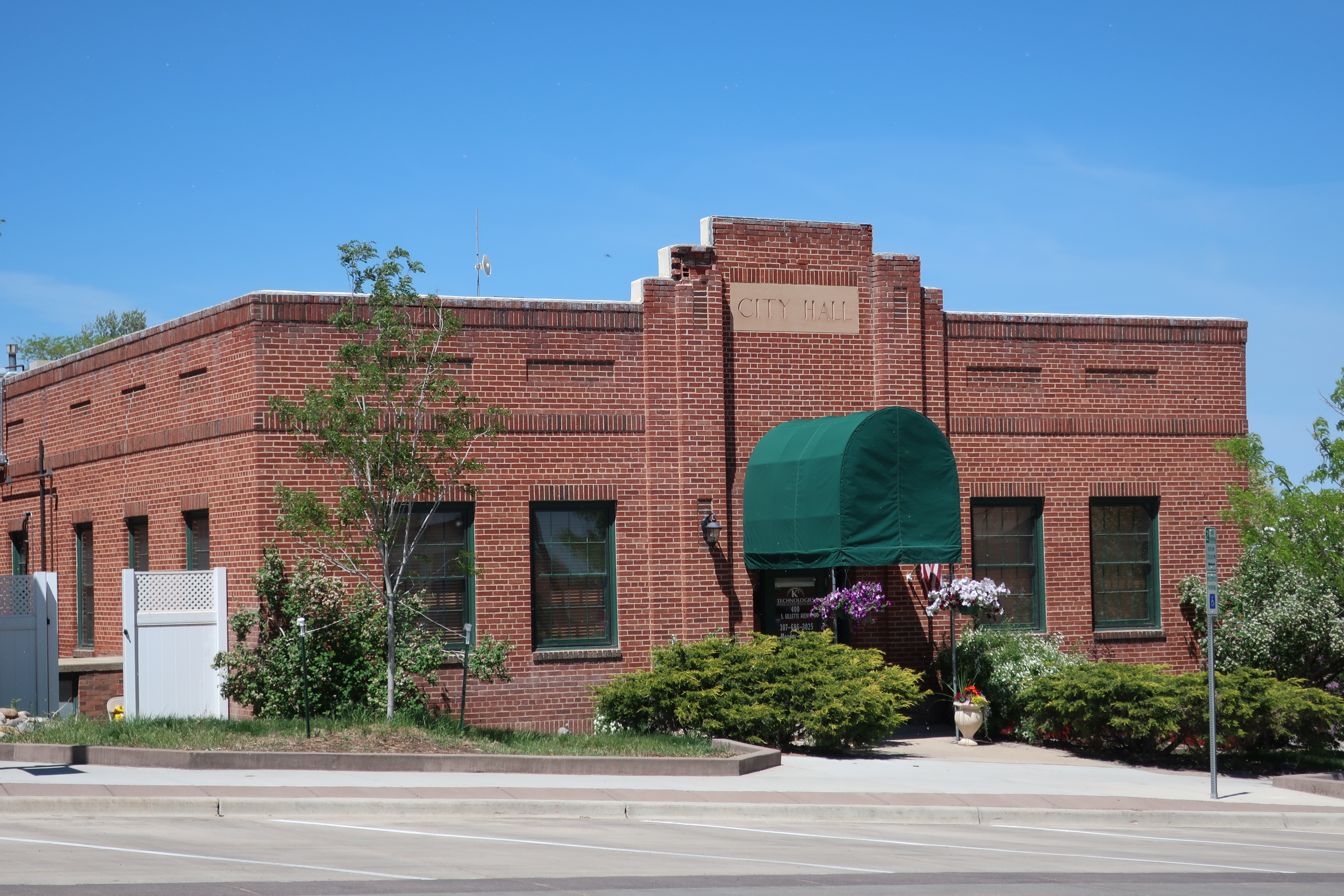

- Location within Wyoming
- Location: 400 S. Gillette Ave., Gillette, Wyoming
- Coordinates: 44°27′28″N 105°30′16″W
- Built: 1936
- Engineer: Robert L. Streeter
- NRHP reference No.: 100004422
- Added to NRHP: September 27, 2019

The Gillette City Hall (1936), at 400 S. Gillette Ave. in Gillette, Wyoming, United States, was built in 1936. It was listed on the National Register of Historic Places in 2019.

It was built during the Great Depression.

A plaque on the brick building lists Mayor Roy Montgomery, four City Council members, and credits Robert L. Streeter, engineer.
