= Entrance Road =

Scenic state highway in Wyoming, United States

Wyoming Highway 110
- Entrance Road
- WYO 110 highlighted in red

Route information
- Maintained by WYDOT & NPS
- Length: 0.585 mi (941 m)
- Existed: 1917–present

Major junctions
- East end: WYO 24
- West end: Devils Tower National Monument Entrance

Location
- Country: United States
- State: Wyoming
- Counties: Crook

Highway system
- Wyoming State Highway System; Interstate; US; State
← WYO 96	→ WYO 111
- Entrance Road--Devils Tower National Monument
- U.S. National Register of Historic Places
- Area: 3 miles (4.8 km)
- Built: 1934
- Architect: NPS Branch of Plans and Design
- MPS: Devils Tower National Monument MPS
- NRHP reference No.: 00000854
- Added to NRHP: July 24, 2000

The Entrance Road at Devils Tower National Monument, officially known as Wyoming Highway 110, is a .585-mile-long (0.941 km) scenic road that provides the approach to the Devil's Tower eminence, affording planned views to arriving visitors.

== Route description ==
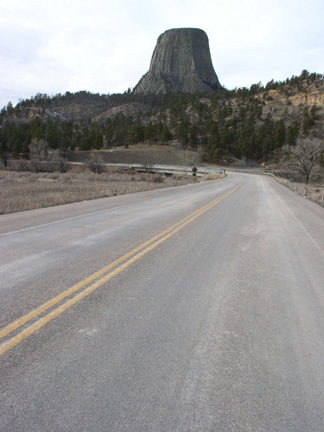
Entrance Road at Devils Tower National Monument

The Wyoming Highway 110 designation is a short 0.59-mile-long (950 m) roadway that starts its at Wyoming Highway 24 and travels west to the Devils Tower National Monument Entrance. Mileposts along WYO 110 increase from east to west.

The entrance road is a 3-mile (4.8 km) long, two-lane, asphalt paved road that spans the distance between the Entrance Station and the visitor parking area located just west of Devil's Tower. The road provides access to the monument's primary developed areas, such as headquarters and visitor center.

== History ==
The road was originally constructed in 1917 with an eight percent grade and a ford at the Belle Fourche River. A bridge was built in 1928, and the road was extensively altered in the 1930s with labor from the Civilian Conservation Corps, improving grades and alignments. CCC camp NM-1 remained at Devil's Tower from 1935 to 1938. A complete loop was planned by the National Park Service Engineering Division in 1927, but was never carried out. The entrance road at Devils Tower is listed on the National Register of Historic Places as an example of close integration with the natural surroundings.

Much of the CCC work involved realignment of the existing road and the careful obliteration of the old alignment, using young trees and sod stockpiled during construction of the new alignment.

== Major intersections ==
The entire route is in Crook County.

Location	mi	km	Destinations	Notes
	0.000	0.000	WYO 24	Eastern terminus of WYO 110
	0.585	0.941	Devils Tower National Monument boundary	Western terminus of WYO 110
1.000 mi = 1.609 km; 1.000 km = 0.621 mi

== See also ==
- Entrance Station (Devils Tower National Monument)
- Old Headquarters Area Historic District
- Tower Ladder (Devils Tower National Monument)
