= Gillette Post Office =

United States historic place

- U.S. National Register of Historic Places
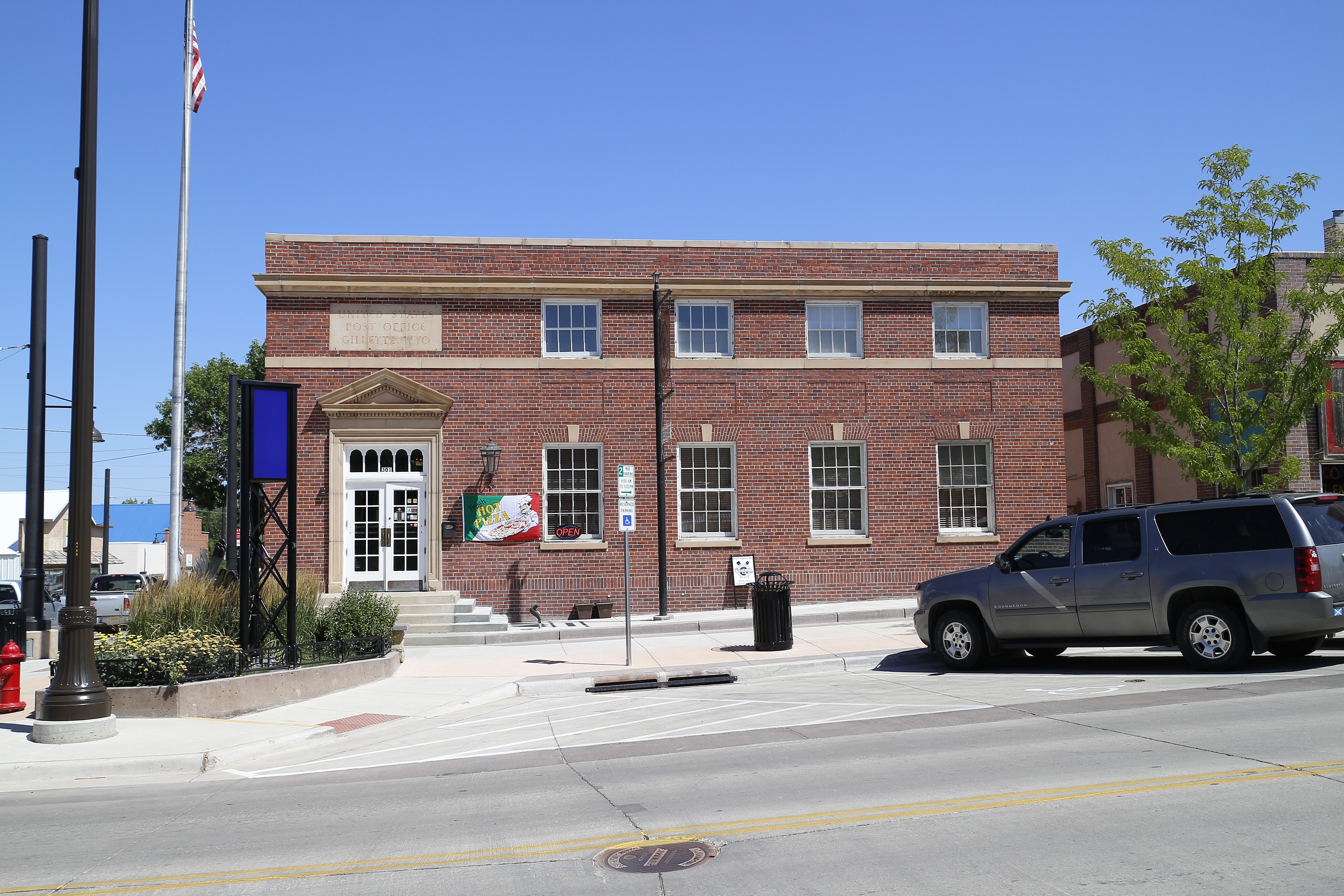

- Location within Wyoming Location within the United States
- Location: 301 S. Gillette Ave., Gillette, Wyoming
- Coordinates: 44.29203°N 105.50366°W
- Built: 1935
- Architect: U.S. Treasury, Louis A. Simon; Blauner Construction Company
- Architectural style: Classical Revival
- MPS: Historic US Post Offices in Wyoming, 1900--1941, TR
- NRHP reference No.: 08001002
- Added to NRHP: October 14, 2008

The Gillette Post Office in Gillette, Wyoming was built in 1935 by the Public Works Administration. The post office was one of the few monumental buildings in Gillette at the time and was a source of local pride. Designed by the Office of the Supervising Architect, the red brick building incorporates austere classical detailing. The front facade is two stories while the remainder of the building is one story. A full second story was not funded.

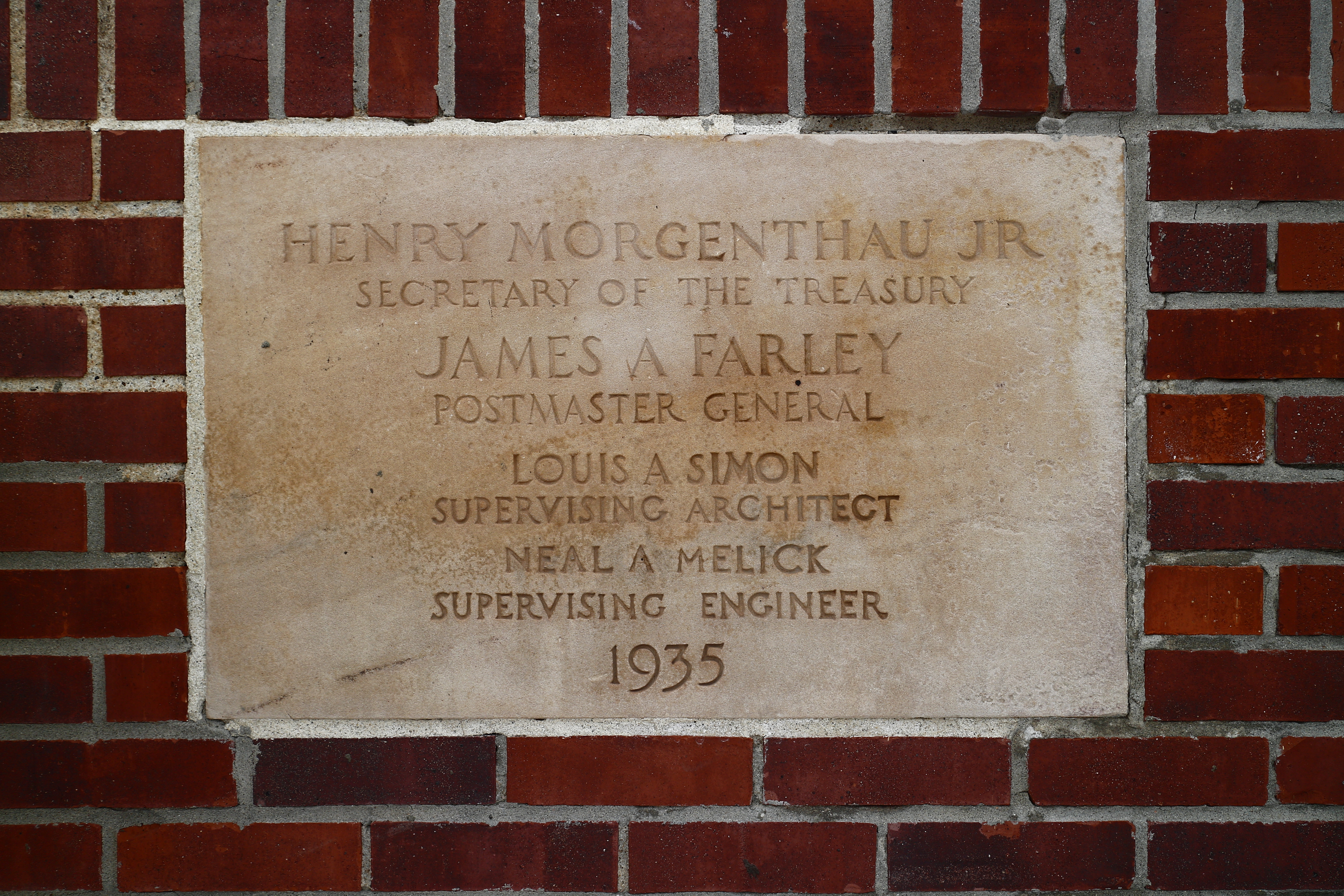
Datestone on the north side of the building.
